= Battle of al-Bab =

2016–17 battle of the Syrian Civil War

Coordinates: 36.3725°N 37.5178°E

- Part of the Operation Euphrates Shield and the Syrian Civil War
- Map of the wider Turkish-led operations and the wider campaigns in northern Aleppo Syrian Arab Armed Forces and allied groups Syrian Democratic Forces Islamic State of Iraq and the Levant FSA groups and Turkish troops in Northern Syria
Date	6 November 2016 – 23 February 2017 (3 months, 2 weeks and 3 days)
Location	Al-Bab District, Aleppo Governorate, Syria
Result	Turkish and SNA victory: Turkish Armed Forces and Syrian National Army/allied Syrian rebels capture the city of al-Bab, the towns of Bizaah and Qabasin and 37 villages from ISIL and 4 villages from SDF; The SDF captures 17 villages and towns, including Arima, from ISIL; The Syrian Army captures 25+ villages and towns including Tadef and several hills from ISIL

Belligerents
Turkey (Syrian opposition) Syrian National Army; Support: Russia (against ISIL only; since 29 Dec. 2016); United States (against ISIL only, since 17 Jan. 2017)	Islamic State	Syrian Democratic Forces (until 27 November 2016); Al-Bab Military Council; Manbij Military Council; (Syria) Syrian Arab Republic; Syrian Armed Forces; Hezbollah; Syrian National Resistance; Syrian Resistance; Support: Russia (against ISIL only)

Commanders and leaders
(Turkey) Lt. Gen. Zekai Aksakallı (Operations chief commander) (Turkey) Lt. Gen. İsmail Metin Temel (Second Army commander) (Syrian opposition) Col. Ahmed Othman (Sultan Murad Division commander) (Syrian opposition) Fahim Issa (Sultan Murad Division commander); Mahmoud Abu Hamza (Descendants of Saladin Brigade commander) (Syrian opposition) Capt. Yussuf Shibli (Qabasin Military Council commander); Capt. Abdel Salam Abdel Razaq (Nour al-Din al-Zenki Movement commander); Capt. Mohammed Abu Mustafa (Sham Legion commander); Abu Jafer (Brigade of Conquest commander) (Syrian opposition) Zakariya Wali (WIA) (Mehmed the Conqueror Brigade military commander)	(Islamic State) Abu Khalid al-Urduni † (ISIL Governor of al-Bab) (Islamic State) Abu Husen Tunisi † (ISIL emir) (Islamic State) Abu Ansari † (ISIL emir) (Islamic State) Jonathan Jeffrey (a.k.a. Abu Ibrahim Al-Francy) (POW) (French ISIL leader in al-Bab)	Adnan Abu Amjad (Manbij Military Council & Northern Sun Battalion commander); Anwar Khabat (Euphrates Liberation Brigade commander)

Units involved
(Turkey) Turkish Armed Forces; Turkish Land Forces; Turkish Air Force; Special Forces; (Syrian opposition) Hawar Kilis Operations Room; Liberation Army; Sultan Murad Division; Sultan Malik-Shah Brigade; Alparslan Special Forces; Sultan Suleiman Shah Division; Sultan Mehmed the Conqueror Brigade; Hamza Division; Dhi Qar Brigade; Northern Thunder Brigade; Samarkand Brigade; Mare' Resistance Brigade; Special Operations Brigade; First Brigade; Fifth Brigade; Brigade 51; Levant Front; Northern Storm Brigade; Liwa Suyuf al-Sham (Azaz branch); Liwa Jund al-Islam; Jaysh al-Shamal; Brigade of Conquest; Sham Legion (Northern Aleppo Governorate branch); Al-Moutasem Brigade; Fastaqim Union (Northern Aleppo Governorate branch); Division 99; Descendants of Saladin Brigade; Northern Falcons Brigade; 1st Division of Aleppo; Elite Islamic Battalions; Army of Grandsons; Akhtarin Military Council; Victory Bloc; Qabasin Military Council; Al-Bab Military Council; Other Syrian rebels: Ahrar al-Sham; Nour al-Din al-Zenki Movement (Northern Aleppo Governorate branch); Liwa Ahrar Souriya; Suyuf al-Shahba Brigade; Free Idlib Army; 13th Division; Northern Division; Ahrar al-Sharqiya; Muntasir Billah Brigade; Mountain Hawks Brigade; 1st Regiment (Northern Aleppo Governorate branch); Authenticity and Development Front; Victory Brigades; Tell Rifaat Military Council; Abna al-Hasaka Union; Qadisiya Brigade; Loyalty Division of Aleppo; Al-Habib al-Mustafa Brigade; Conquest Brigade; Mare' Military Council; 10th Brigade	Military of ISIL; Wilāyat Ḥalab; Sharia police	Syrian Democratic Forces; Army of Revolutionaries; Tribal forces; Seljuk Brigade; Northern Sun Battalion; Qabasin Martyrs Brigade; Al-Bab Revolutionaries Front; Kieba Martyrs Brigade; Ahrar Arima Brigade; Martyr Silo al-Rai Brigade; Al-Bab Countryside Martyrs Brigade; Euphrates Liberation Brigade; YPG; YPJ; Shahba Forces; (Syrian opposition) Northern Democratic Brigade; Syrian Armed Forces; Syrian Army (since 16 Jan. 2017); Republican Guard; Tiger Forces; Syrian Arab Air Force; Kafr Saghir Martyrs Brigade

Strength
(Turkey) 1,300–4,000 soldiers 40 tanks originally, 10 reinforcements 15+ APCs (Syrian opposition) 2,000–3,000 rebel fighters	3,000–5,000 militants	Unknown 10,000 soldiers

Casualties and losses
(Turkey) 59 killed 8-10 Leopard 2 tanks destroyed, at least 2 captured (Syrian opposition) 500+ killed	(Islamic State) 1,348+ killed (Turkish and SAA claims)	46 killed 13+ killed
- 444 civilians killed 30,000+ civilians fled

The Battle of al-Bab was a battle for the city of al-Bab in the Aleppo Governorate that included a military offensive launched by Syrian rebel groups (including groups affiliated with the Free Syrian Army) and the Turkish Armed Forces north of al-Bab, a separate Syrian Democratic Forces (SDF) offensive east and west of the city, and another Syrian Army offensive from the south of the city. The northern Turkish-led forces intended to capture al-Bab from the Islamic State of Iraq and the Levant (ISIL), as part of the Turkish military intervention in Syria. By the end of the battle, the Turkish-led forces had captured al-Bab, Qabasin, and Bizaah, while the Syrian Army captured Tadef and other areas further south, with the SDF making gains further to the east and the west.

The battle was concurrent with the other anti-ISIL operations, including the Raqqa campaign launched by the SDF, the Battle of Mosul launched by the Iraqi forces, and the Palmyra offensive, which was successfully conducted by ISIL against Syrian government forces. It was also claimed by Kurds to be the result of an "Aleppo for al-Bab" agreement between the Syrian government and Turkey, with Turkey withdrawing its support to rebels in Aleppo in exchange to laisser-faire up to al-Bab, thus cutting short the possibility of an East-West Kurdish corridor.

== Background ==
After the western al-Bab offensive during the previous month, the rebels moved their focus from the western countryside of al-Bab so to avoid confrontation with the Syrian Democratic Forces, and launched an assault against the Islamic State north of al-Bab.

== The offensive ==
=== Northern rebel attack repelled ===
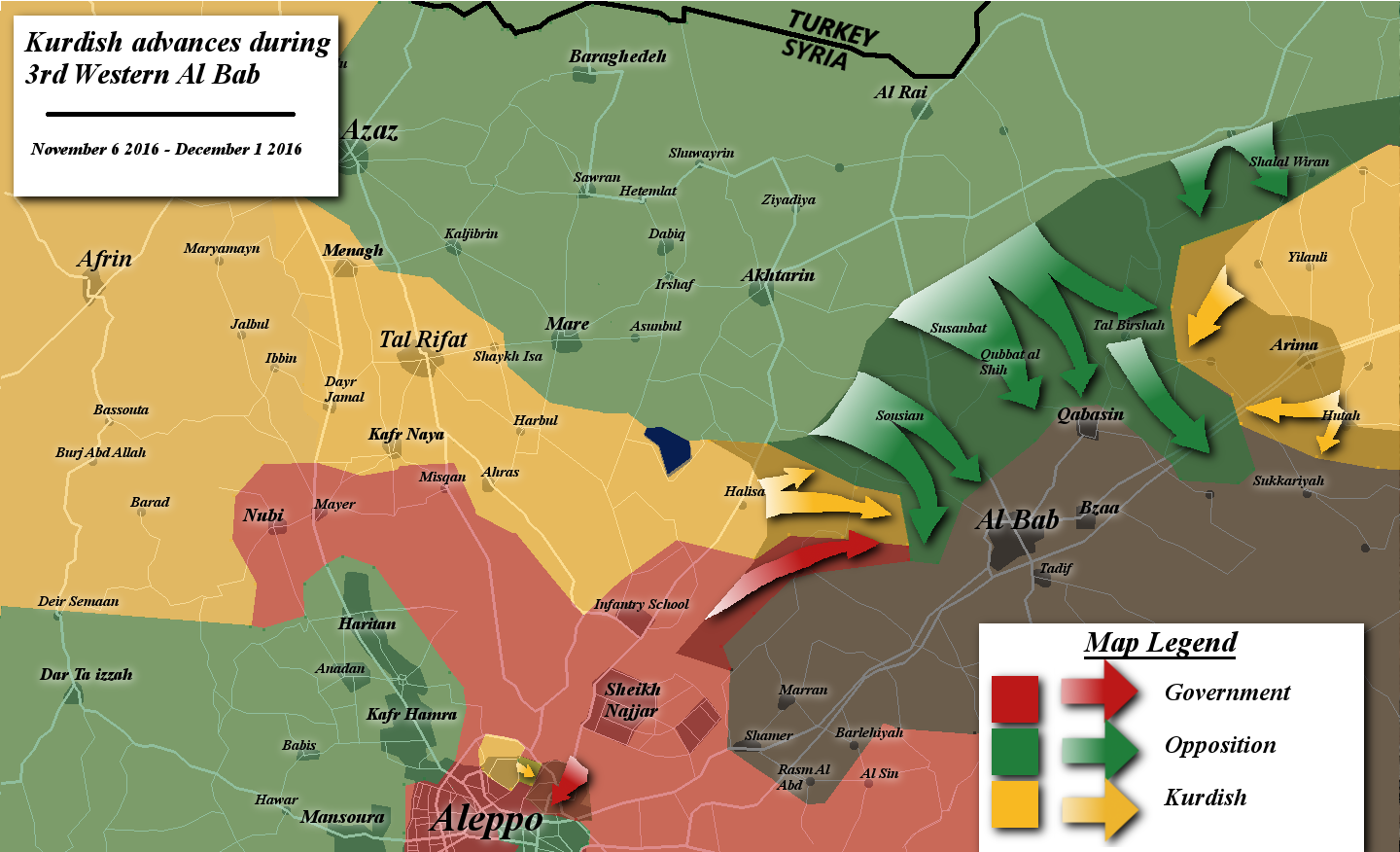
Map of the battle up to December 1

Between 6 and 14 November 2016, the rebels captured 36 villages, putting them within two kilometers of al-Bab. Meanwhile, the Syrian Democratic Forces captured seven villages east of al-Bab in an attempt to besiege the town of Arima.

On 14 November, rebel forces managed to enter the northern outskirts of al-Bab, but were facing stiff resistance, with fighting raging at a livestock market two kilometers north of the town. By this point, al-Bab was surrounded from the north and northwest, with the only retreat route remaining for ISIL to the southeast towards Raqqa, through the ISIL-held town of Dayr Hafir. In the evening, the rebels established fire control over the Jafirah Roundabout and seized several adjacent buildings in the northern part of al-Bab, leaving them in control of less than 5 percent of the city. However, the next day, the rebels were forced to withdraw one kilometer to the north of al-Bab. Meanwhile, the rebels took control of the town of Qabasin, northeast of al-Bab.

The Turkish military stated on 18 November that the FSA had captured five villages in the Karadağ area of al-Rai district.

On 19 November, ISIL recaptured Qabasin, as well as one nearby village. This marked the fourth time the town had changed hands in the previous four days. On 20 November, the rebels launched two counter-attacks against Qabasin, with both being repelled. The next day, the rebels redirected their assault from al-Bab to the Kurdish-held village of Sheikh Nassir, managing to seize the village in the early morning hours, but losing it in an SDF counter-attack in the afternoon. Between 22 and 23 November, Qabasin changed hands two more times, ultimately remaining under ISIL control.

=== Western and eastern encirclement of al-Bab ===
On 23 November, the SDF captured Arima. In response, Turkish artillery shelled the SDF-held villages in the area.

On 24 November, according to the Turkish military, the Syrian Arab Air Force conducted an airstrike against Turkish Special Forces and Turkish Free Syrian Army (TFSA) aligned Turkish-backed rebels north of al-Bab, killing three Turkish soldiers and injuring ten. Turkish officials initially stated the casualties were due to an ISIL attack, before blaming the Syrian Air Force. However, the pro-opposition activist group the Syrian Observatory for Human Rights (SOHR) disputed it was an air strike and stated it was in fact an ISIL suicide attack. ISIL confirmed it conducted a suicide attack in the area. Later, the Turkish Prime Minister's office issued a gag order on reporting about the airstrike, while the main Turkish opposition Republican People's Party (CHP) leader Kemal Kılıçdaroğlu called on the Turkish government to "act with common sense". In the evening, the Syrian Air Force officially denied it or the Russian Air Force had conducted an air strike against Turkish forces. The same day, the SDF, with support from government forces, captured three villages from ISIL west of al-Bab, coming within 10 kilometers of the city. The rebels also took two villages east of al-Bab, reaching the main road between al-Bab and Manbij for the first time.

Between 25 and 27 November, the SDF captured two villages from ISIL west of al-Bab, while the rebels took three to the east. Additionally, the rebels launched an attack on two SDF-held villages east of the city, with unclear results. At the same time, pro-government forces also advanced, taking control of four villages from ISIL to the west of al-Bab.

On 28 November, the Syrian Army captured a village from the Turkish-backed rebels west of al-Bab, coming within 5 kilometers of the city. On 29 November, ISIL claimed it had captured two Turkish soldiers and their Turkmen translator near al-Dana village, west of al-Bab. The Turkish military confirmed it had lost contact with two soldiers, but didn't confirm that ISIL had captured them.

=== Offensive slows ===
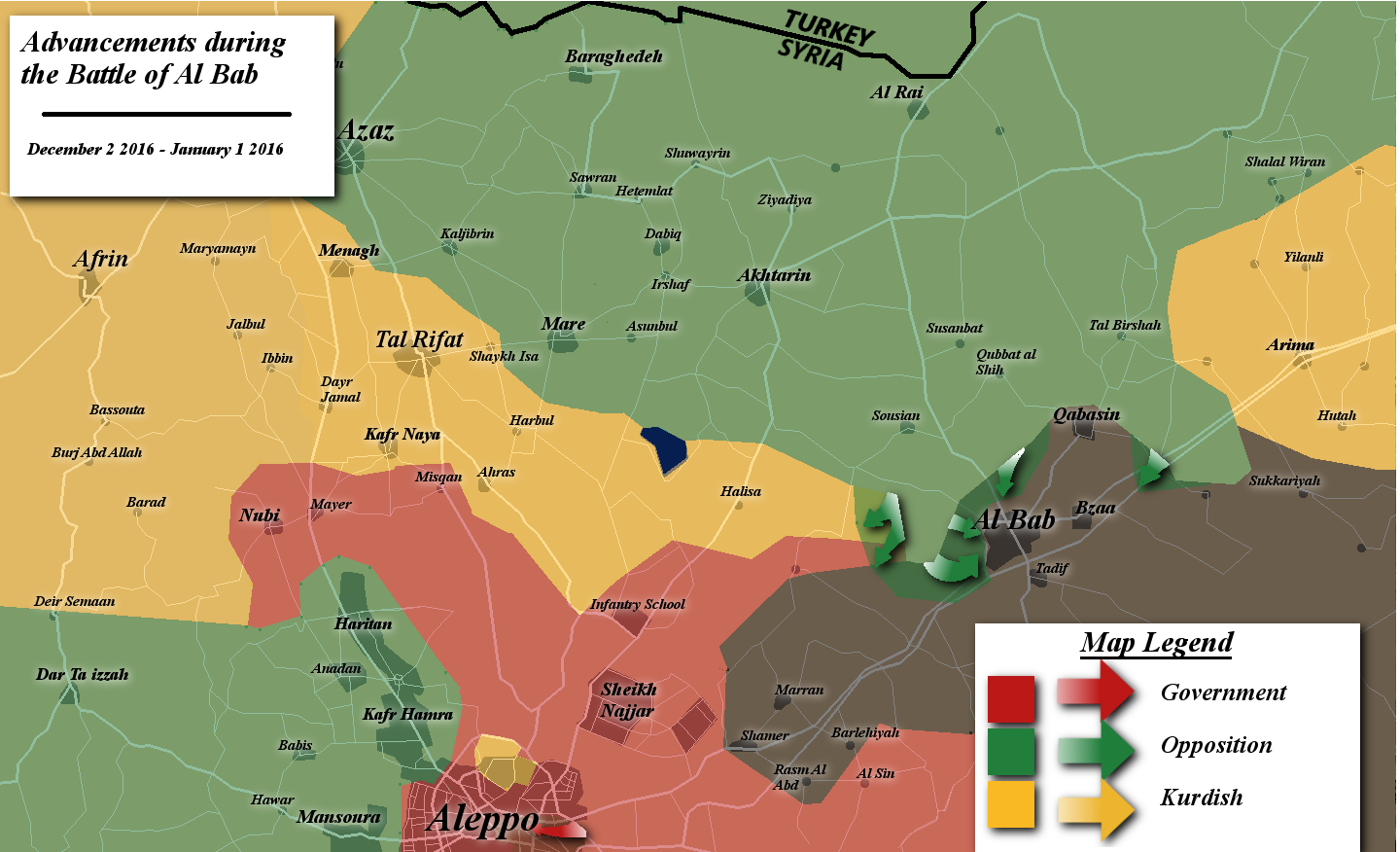
Map of the battle up to January 1

On 2 December, the rebels were ordered not to advance on the center of the city for the time being. The wider offensive had also slowed down, with no progress being achieved by the rebels during the following two days.

The rebels captured two villages west of al-Bab in a fresh assault on 9 December, in addition to part of the highway between al-Bab and Manbij. Meanwhile, 300 Turkish commandos were sent as reinforcement. On 10 December, the rebels captured several areas including some in the Aqil Mountains to the west of al-Bab. The next day, the rebels entered the city from the northwest after heavy clashes.

The Turkish military dropped leaflets on al-Bab on 12 December, urging civilians to seek shelter as the rebels advanced. Still, the rebel advance soon slowed down due to ditches, mines and explosives left by ISIL. Despite this, Numan Kurtulmuş, the Deputy Prime Minister of Turkey, stated that preparations for a final operation on al-Bab were underway. On 17 December, the rebels captured a village in the area.

=== Turkish-led attack from the west repelled ===
On 21 December, the rebels gained control of a part of the highway between Al-Bab and Aleppo. Nonetheless, the day soon became the deadliest thus far for Turkish forces in Syria. According to the Turkish government, 16 Turkish soldiers were killed in suicide bomb attacks and clashes, while 33 were wounded. It also claimed 138 ISIL fighters were killed in Turkish airstrikes on 67 ISIL targets. ISIL meanwhile claimed to have killed more than 70 Turkish soldiers, while capturing two Leopard 2 tanks. The fighting started when rebels and Turkish forces captured the Al-Bab National Hospital, as well as the highly strategic Aqil Mountains/Jabal 'Aql in West of Al-Bab. However not long after, ISIS militants launch counter-attack with heavy fire from the town. ISIS suicide bomber named "Abu Osama Al-Shami" drove an SVBIED towards the Turkish armor located southwest side of the National Hospital, inflicting heavy casualties on the Turkish position. The counterattack recaptured both the hospital and the mountains as result, repelling the Turkish-led attack. Another attack was launched by the rebels on 22 December. SOHR reported that 72 civilians were killed in Turkish airstrikes during the day, with another 23 killed on the next day.

Despite the losses, President of Turkey Recep Tayyip Erdoğan stated on 23 December that the operation to capture al-Bab was almost complete and that the FSA would capture the city soon. The same day, the Turkish Defence Minister Fikri Işık stated that the Aqil Mountains had been cleared of ISIL. The Turkish-backed rebels also later captured the Al-Farouq hospital. However, an ISIL counterattack in the early hours of 25 December, once again recaptured the hospital and Aqil Mountains. Meanwhile, 30 civilians trying to flee the city were reportedly killed by explosives planted by ISIL.

=== Russian air support for Turkey ===
On 26 December, pro-Syrian government sources reported that the Russian Air Force directly backed the Turkish Army for the first time since the start of the Russian intervention in Syria. However, despite Su-24 and Su-34 bombers carrying out airstrikes against ISIL fighters, Turkish-backed rebel forces were unable to maintain control over newly captured areas. Turkish Deputy Prime Minister Kurtulmuş denied the reports that the Russian Air Force was assisting the Turks in the battle, while an additional 1,000 Turkish commandos and 2,000 rebel reinforcements arrived on 27 December.

A Turkish official stated on 29 December, that the Russian Air Force had hit ISIL in al-Bab for the first time, carrying out airstrikes against it in the southern part of the city. He also added that Turkish forces were assaulting the northern and western parts of the city. Turkish Foreign Minister Mevlüt Çavuşoğlu confirmed the airstrikes but stated that there was no joint operation between Russia and Turkey. On 31 December, the Turkish-backed rebels managed to capture another village to the west of al-Bab, while Syrian Democratic Forces entered the villages of Mura'naz and Kuljabreen, clashing with the Turkish-backed rebels there.

Between 2 and 3 January, both Turkish and Russian airstrikes hit ISIL targets in the al-Bab area. United States Department of Defense spokesman Peter Cook meanwhile stated that it had assisted Turkish forces by providing it with air cover a week earlier, but did not carry out any airstrikes. On 4 January, ISIL was reported to have withdrawn its senior fighters to defend Raqqa and Mosul, leaving less experienced members to defend al-Bab. Both Turkish President Erdoğan and the rebels stated that the offensive to capture the town would be finished soon. However, two days later, Turkish Defence Minister Işık stated that the Turkish-backed rebels were fighting street battles against ISIL in al-Bab but had slowed down their advance in order to avoid civilian casualties.

=== Turkish-backed rebel assault from the east and Syrian Army assault from the south ===
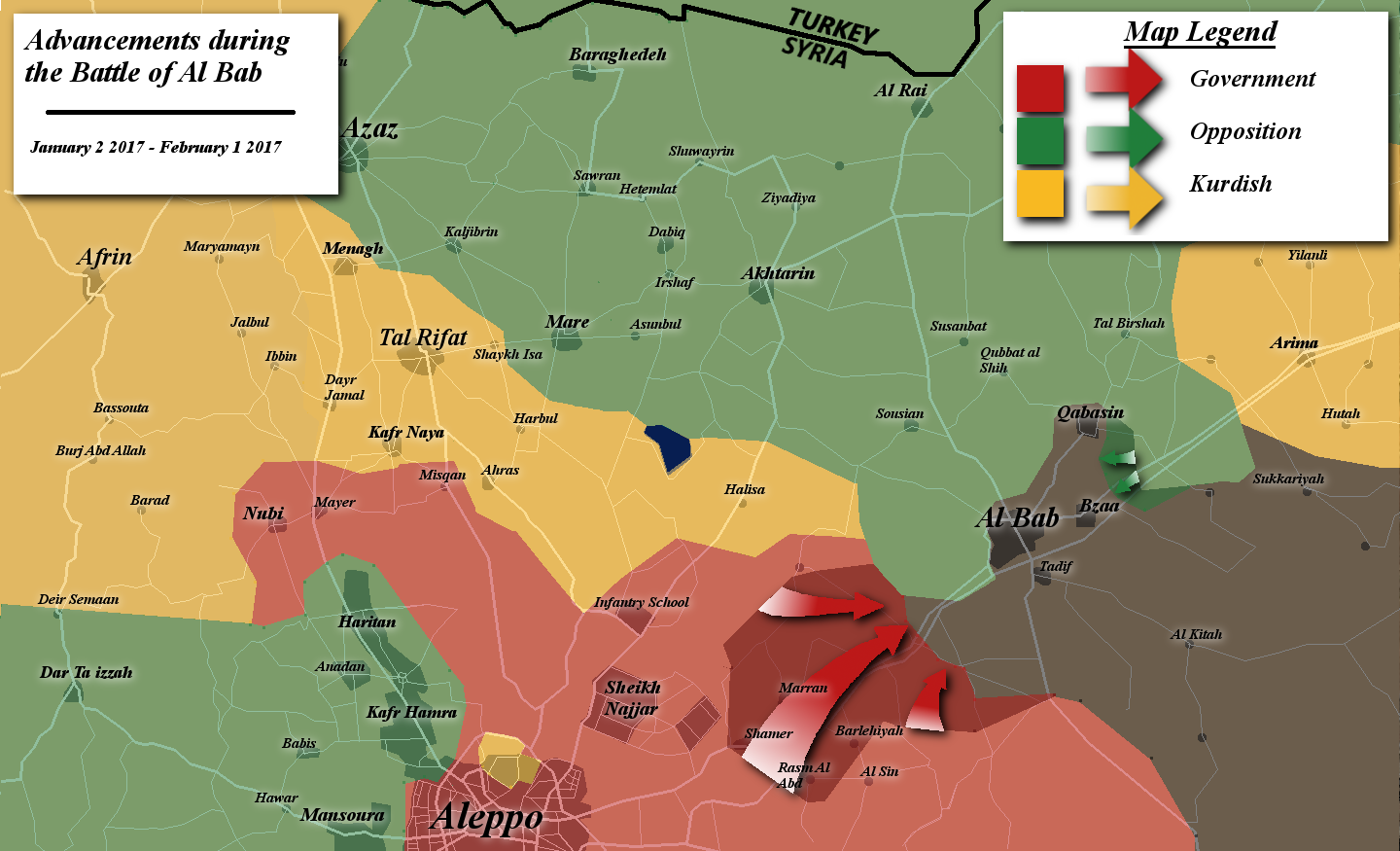
Map of the battle up to February 1

After failing to penetrate al-Bab from the north or west, rebel and Turkish forces started assaults from the east. On 8 January, Turkish-backed rebels captured Um Adasa and Makri Hill near Bizaah. The next day, the rebels once again advanced near Bizaah, capturing Zammar and Asfar Tepe. With these advances, the rebels were attempting to flank al-Bab from the east. Still, in the period between 1 and 14 January, the rebels made eight attempts to capture the nearby village of Al-Suflaniyah, with all of them being repelled. At one point, on 13 January, the rebels managed to capture Suflaniyah temporarily, but had to retreat from it after an ISIL counter-attack.

A local media activist claimed the Syrian Army and its allies launched an offensive to take al-Bab on 15 January, using the Kuweires Military Airbase as a launch pad for attacks on Tadef and Abu Jabaar to the south of the city. However, a pro-government source reported preparations were still being made for the offensive. Meanwhile, the Turkish military had reportedly prepared a new plan to capture the city.

On 17 January, the Syrian Army launched an assault led by its Tiger Forces (capturing a village to the south of the city), the United States Armed Forces stated that they had carried out airstrikes against ISIL near al-Bab, and Russia and Turkey carried out their first joint airstrikes against ISIL, targeting it in the suburbs of al-Bab. The SAA captured three more villages to the south of the city within the next two days. The Syrian Army captured another village to the south of the city on 20 January. The Turkish-backed rebels later recaptured Suflaniyah. Five Turkish soldiers were killed in an ISIL attack later on the village.

The Syrian Army and its allies captured seven villages to the southwest of al-Bab between 22 and 23 January. Suflaniyah changed hands twice, ultimately remaining under rebel control. However, some Turkish activists claimed the village was never recaptured by ISIL. On 23 January, Turkish-backed rebels were reported to have captured Tel Rehal and Kharabishah villages. However, Tel Rehal was later reported to have been captured by the SAA, who also took three other villages. On the same day, Turkish deputy prime minister Numan Kurtulmuş denied claims that Turkey would hand over al-Bab to the Syrian Army. The Turkish-backed rebels recaptured Suflaniyah after having lost it earlier.

On 25 January, the Syrian Army captured Shaalah village, as well as the Shaalah radar base. On the next day, the SDF repelled an ISIL attack on their positions east of al-Bab. The Syrian Army captured three villages to the south during the same day as well as al-Mamoun University. The SAA captured a strategic hill during a midnight assault. On 28 January, the Syrian Army seized two more villages and another two the next day, while the rebels captured two hills in the region. On 30 January, the Syrian Army seized two more villages, as well as a hill.

On 1 February, the Turkish-backed rebels captured 2 villages to the southwest of al-Bab, cutting the main road between the city and Aleppo from another side in front of the recent advances by pro-Syrian government forces who had come with 7 kilometres (4.3 mi). Meanwhile, SAA also captured a village to the south of Kuweires airbase. The rebels captured a village, a hill, 2 farms and 4 settlements to the east of Bizaah.

On 3 February, UN Secretary-General Stephane Dujjaric estimated that around 30,000 civilians had fled al-Bab, and that 10,000 still remained inside of the city.

On 4 February, the rebels captured Bizaah though ISIL recaptured it later. Meanwhile, SAA captured a town to the south of al-Bab. On the next day, the SAA, with support from Hezbollah and Russian artillery, captured a village to the south of Kuweires Airbase, and another village to the south of al-Bab, as well as Tal Uwayshiya hill, which overlooks the main supply route to al-Bab. The SAA advance effectively cut off the last main supply route to the city, putting it under a siege. Meanwhile, the Turkish military stated that Abu Khalid al-Urduni, ISIL's governor of al-Bab, was killed in clashes. The rebels recaptured Bizaah on the next day. On 7 February, ISIL recaptured Bizaah. The SAA and Hezbollah, meanwhile, captured 3 villages and a nearby hill to the south of Al-Bab. They later captured a hill and many other sites to the south of the Kuweires airbase, extending their control over Sabkhat al-Jabbul and fully securing the road near it. Later on the same day, it was reported that the rapid Syrian Army advances had nearly encircled 5,000 ISIL militants within Al-Bab and its environs.

=== Turkish-backed forces enter al-Bab, Syrian Army reaches southern outskirts ===
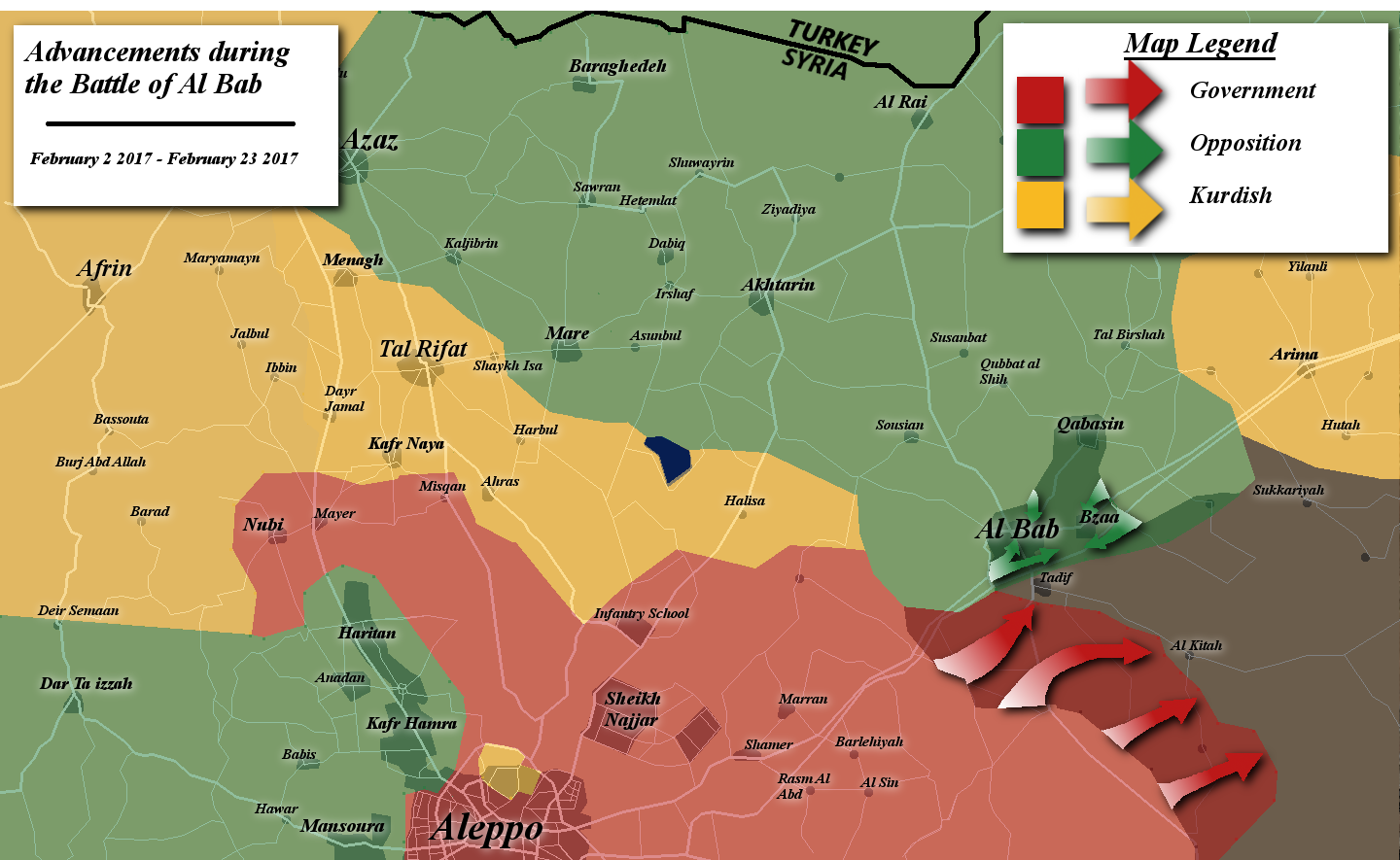
Map of the final advances, up to 23 February.

During the night of 7 February, Turkish forces and rebels launched an assault at Al-Bab, capturing several strategic hills and breaking into the city. The rebels captured several other sites including Aqil Mount, the nearby hospital, a youth housing area and a local roundabout in the west of the city. On 9 February, the Syrian Army captured two villages to the south of al-Bab, putting them within 3 kilometres (1.9 mi) of the city On the same day, three Turkish soldiers were killed while 11 others were injured in an unintentional airstrike on a building near al-Bab by the Russian Air Force, who said they believed it was occupied by ISIL fighters. Russian President Vladimir Putin offered condolences to Turkish President Erdoğan for the incident and blamed it on poor co-ordination between Turkish and Russian forces. During the same day, Turkish-backed rebels assaulted ISIL positions inside the city after breaking through their defences. The rebels also stated that they had clashed with the Syrian Army for the first time in the battle, in a village to the southwest of the city. Turkish troops and rebels were also reported to have captured Qabasin and Bizaah, by Turkish media as well as rebel groups. These advances haven't been independently verified. The BBC stated that the towns were surrounded, with clashes ongoing.

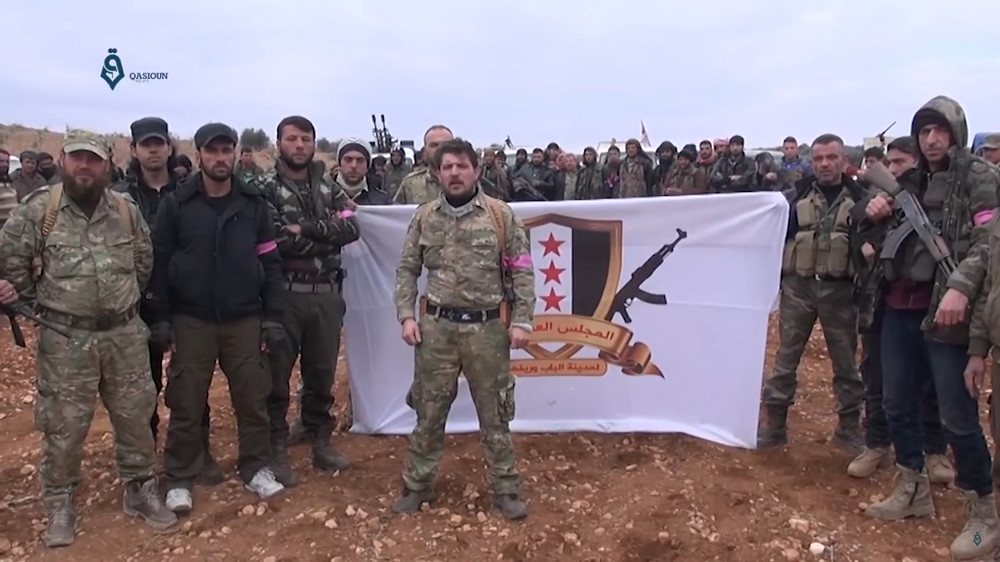
The al-Bab military council declares on 10 February that it would soon capture al-Bab.

On 10 February, the Syrian Army captured Abu Taltal village to the south of the city, putting them within 1.5 kilometres (0.93 mi) of the city. On 11 February clashes were reported in the town of Tadef, less than 2 kilometres from Al-Bab, between Tiger Forces together with National Defense Forces fighting against ISIL. On the same day, Russian media reported that Tadef had been taken by the Syrian Army. The rebels also managed to capture several important points in al-Bab after an assault on the city, according to SOHR as well as rebel sources. The advance put one-tenth of the city under their control. They later recaptured Qabasin from ISIL. Later on the same day, it was reported that Turkish-backed forces had captured the Tadef roundabout, to the northwest of the town of Tadef, effectively cutting off the Syrian Army from Al-Bab.

On 12 February, Turkish President Erdogan said that Turkish troops and their allies had entered the centre of al-Bab and had captured the most important point, the hospital hill. He added that establishing full control of the town was a "matter of time". According to pro-government sources, the rebels lost Qabasin again and failed in several attempts to recapture it, as well as Bizaah, but captured the Al-Rai and Al-Shehabi Farms at the northern entrance of al-Bab.

On 12 February, the Syrian Army redirected its efforts from al-Bab into an offensive northeast of Kuweires airbase.

Between 13 and 17 February, Turkish sources made multiple claims of large advances within al-Bab itself. According to a report by Hürriyet Daily News, the Turkish-backed rebels had captured 40% of al-Bab's city centre, while the Turkish Prime Minister claimed that al-Bab was largely under the control of Turkish-backed forces at the same time as the rebels lost territory inside al-Bab. On 17 February, Turkey's military claimed that it was close to capturing al-Bab. However, the SOHR disputed this, and cited local sources that stated that 90 percent of the city was still under the control of ISIL. The same day, ISIL recaptured some territory in al-Bab after a counter-attack.

=== Turkish-backed forces capture al-Bab ===
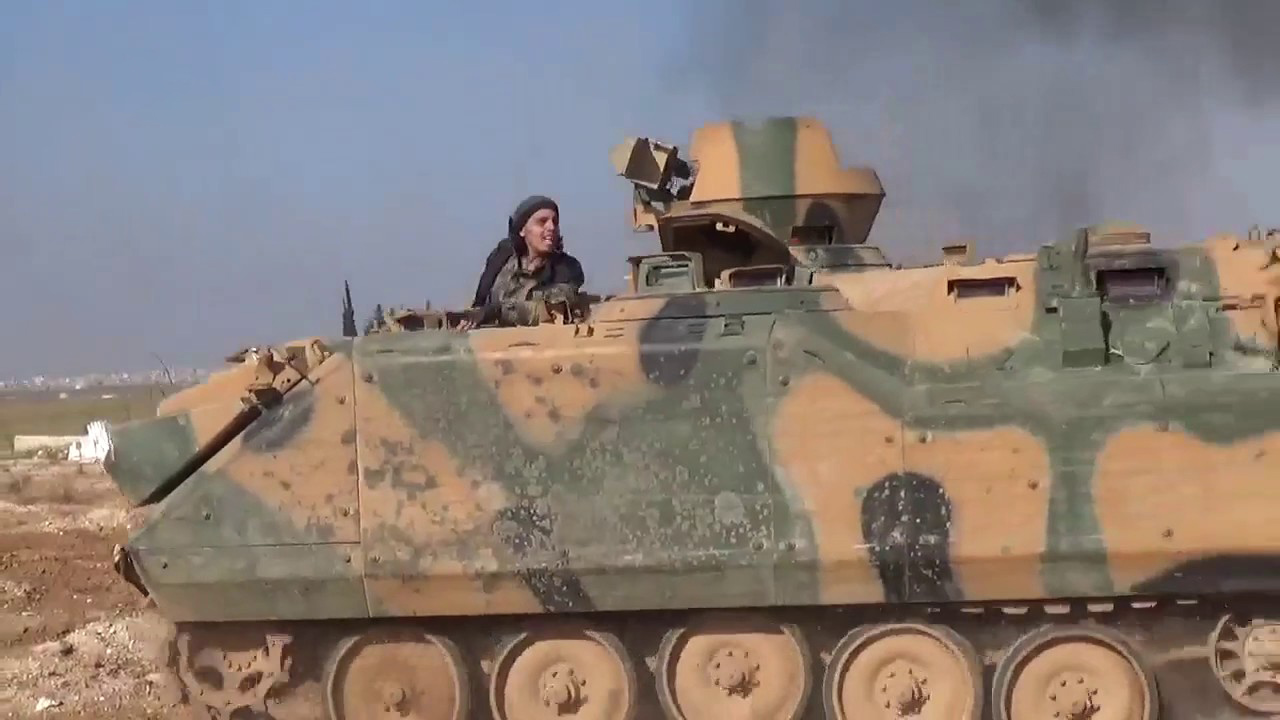
A rebel FNSS ACV-15 enters the town of Bizaah on 4 February 2017

The rebels, backed by Turkish forces, launched another attack on 20 February, advancing in the western part of the city. During the clashes, they captured French ISIL leader Jonathan Jeffrey, also known by his alias Abu Ibrahim al-Francy, who is accused of planning attacks in European cities and recruiting young Europeans.

On 23 February 2017, Turkish and rebel forces launched another attack on al-Bab and reportedly seized most of the city, with Turkish Defence Minister Fikri Işık announcing they were in near complete control. However, street battles were still ongoing with SOHR stating ISIL still controlled more than half of the city. The Turkish-backed rebels later took full control of the city, which was then confirmed by SOHR. They also captured Qabasin and Bizaah after ISIL withdrew to the south.

== Aftermath ==
On 24 February, an ISIL suicide-bomber killed over 50 people and wounded 70 more, in the village of Sosyan, to the northwest of Al-Bab. Later in the day another explosion was heard in the same village, with casualties rising to at least 68. Soon after Turkish-backed rebel forces captured Al-Bab, Turkish forces began shelling ISIL forces in the town of Tadef, to the south of Al-Bab.

Meanwhile, between 24 and 25 February, Syrian Government forces continued their advances southeast of Al-Bab, capturing multiple villages. Later on 25 February, ISIL had withdrawn most of its fighters from Tadef, although at the time it was unknown whether the town would come under the control of the Syrian Army or Turkish-backed forces. On the next day, the SAA captured the town, after clashing with the remaining ISIL fighters. After Syrian Army forces secured Tadef, the Free Syrian Army forces began attacking the Syrian Army near the town, reportedly killing 22 SAA soldiers. However, a Syrian Government correspondent said that the claims of the number of SAA soldiers killed were grossly exaggerated. Syrian Army forces stationed at Tadef may also potentially use it as a launching pad to capture Al-Bab from the Turkish-led forces. On 27 February, it was reported that Russia had mediated another ceasefire between SAA and FSA forces in the area.

After the end of the battle, some of the remaining civilians reported that ISIL had moved people around in the city as human shields, that ISIL had set up checkpoints and turned back anyone who tried to leave, and that they often chased people out of their homes in order to hide there. They also reported that they didn't leave because they feared the ISIL forces, and because ISIL had mined the city before they left.

In late September 2018, Jaysh al-Islam fighters deported from East Ghouta announced a massive reorganization of the group as well as plans to begin construction of a new neighborhood in al-Bab for people exiled from East Ghouta.

=== Use of Leopard 2 tanks ===
Initially, three of the Turkish Leopard 2A4s operating in Syria were destroyed or damaged by ISIS using anti-tank missile systems (possibly Fagot or Konkurs anti-tank guided missiles obtained from Syrian or Iraqi Army captured stocks). In mid-December 2016, two 2A4 tanks were captured by ISIS near al-Bab city in Syria during Euphrates Shield operations; Amaq News Agency posted video of the captured vehicles. By late December 2016, Islamic State had captured or incapacitated 10 Leopard 2A4s. Some of the 10 were damaged by IEDs, while the rest were damaged by anti-tank weapons. This is the largest number of Leopard 2A4 tanks to have been incapacitated in any one conflict. Additional ISIS propaganda images and video depicting several completely destroyed Leopards, some with their turrets blown off, were published in January 2017. Tanks which suffered the worst damage may have been destroyed by air strikes in order to prevent capture but sources generally state that the damage was caused solely with anti-tank missiles or car bombs driven by a suicide bomber (also known as suicide vehicle borne improvised explosive devices or SVBIED).

In January 2017, the German newspaper Die Welt reported that ISIL fighters used 9M133 Kornet anti-tank missiles to destroy six Leopard 2 tanks used by the Turkish military in Syria.

At least eight Leopard 2 MBT have been destroyed according to photographic reports.
