= Vehicle registration plates of Syria =

Syria requires its residents to register their motor vehicles and display vehicle registration plates. Since the start of the Syrian civil war in 2011 and the fragmentation of control and governance in the Syrian territory, there have been parallel license plate formats introduced in various regions of Syria by the de facto rulers.

== Current series ==
=== Syrian transitional government ===
A new set of vehicle registration plates was shown on the state-run Syrian Arab News Agency, with a major difference being the removal of Eastern Arabic numerals and the use of FE-Schrift. The flag of Syria was also seen, with the country's ISO 3166-1 alpha-3 code SYR being shown on the bottom and the Arabic translation of 'Syria' being shown above; though, on some plates, they are placed side-to-side instead.

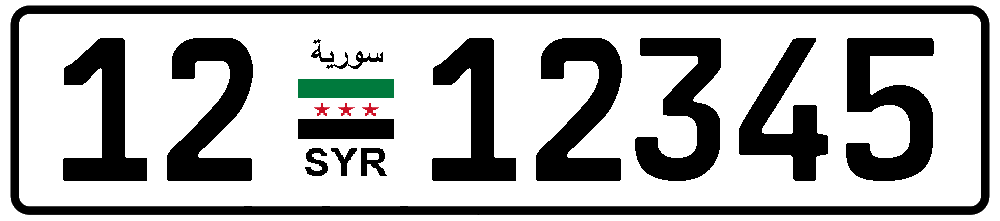

=== AANES (Rojava) ===
Autonomous Administration of North and East Syria (AANES), more commonly known as Rojava, is a de facto autonomous subnational entity set up by the Syrian Democratic Forces in the Northern and Eastern parts of Syria. This entity also issues its own license plates. Adjacent to the code "SYR", the license plates also show the two-letter code "BS", separated by a Kurdish Sun. "BS" stands for "Bakurê Sûriyê", Kurdish for "Northern Syria". The background of the national ("SYR") and regional ("B*S") match that of the plate itself, and the text color matches the text of the plate.

Prior to the above standardization, in the earlier versions of AANES license plates, instead of "B*S", a regional code "R*" was shown, standing for "Rojavayê Kurdistanê" meaning "Western Kurdistan", which isn't inclusive of the Arab residents of the region, that after the defeat of ISIS, ended up becoming the majority of the population of the region. Furthermore, previously the background color behind the regional code was green, and the Kurdish Sun was colored yellow. The color scheme of the plate has since then been simplified.

The plates consist of 6 digits. In contrast with the format used by the Damascus government, Latin numbers take precedence and are on the top, while Arabic numbers are at the bottom.

License plates of AANES no longer show governorates, instead showing Regions of the AANES (with the exception of Jazira Region (Qamishli)) in Arabic and a 3-letter Latin code derived from Kurdish.

As for the Jazira Region, license plates are issued for each of the Districts under its jurisdiction, bearing in mind that Ras al-Ayn (Sere Kaniye) District is under Turkish occupation. Alongside Arabic names and 3-letter Kurdish codes, license plates of Jazira Region also generally show jurisdiction names in the Syriac Language of the ethnic Assyrian Minority of the region. For example, for the district of Qamishli, the 4-letter Syriac code "ܩ ܡ ܫ ܐ" is used, four disconnected letters that are meant to be an abbreviation of the Syriac name of Qamishli, "ܩܡܫܠܐ". For the district of Hasaka, the full name of the district in Syriac, "ܚܣܝܟܐ" is used.

The displayed Arabic names of the regions do not match the common and officially-recognized (by the Damascus government). For example, for Qamishli, instead of القامشلي (Al-Qamishli), the name قامشلو (Qamishlo) is shown. Same applies to Kobani, known in Arabic as "Ayn al-Arab".

Below is the list of the regions and their display names. Currently, the status of these registration plates are unknown.

Jurisdiction	English name	Arabic name	Kurdish code	Syriac code
Qamishli District	Qamishli	قامشلو	QMŞ	ܩ ܡ ܫ ܐ
Al-Hasakah District	Hasaka	الحسكة	HSK	ܚܣܝܟܐ
Al-Malikiyah (Derik) District	Al-Malikiyah	ديرك	DRK	
Euphrates Region	Kobani	كوباني	KBN	
Afrin Region	Afrin	عفرين	EFR	
Raqqa Region	Raqqa	الرقة	RQE	
Tabqa Region	Al-Tabqah	الطبقة	TBQ	
Manbij Region	Manbij	منبج	MNB	
Deir ez-Zor Region	Deir ez-Zor	دير الزور	DRZ	

There are four general vehicle classifications under AANES jurisdiction, private, commercial, police, and administrative.

Passenger vehicle plates have a white background and blue text.

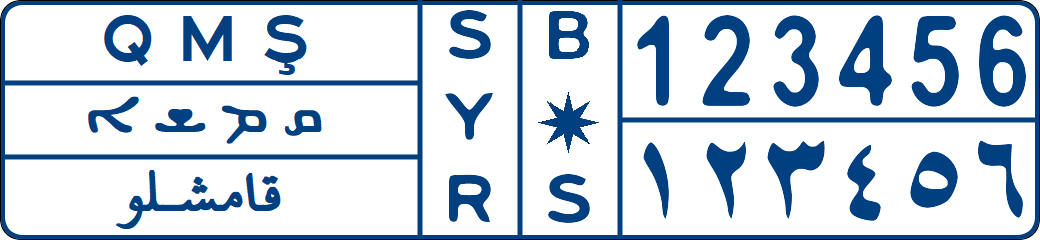

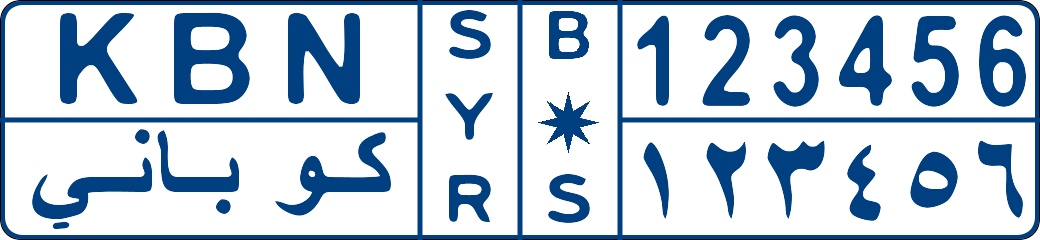

Motorcycle license plates have a reduced size. They still show the jurisdiction in both Arabic and Kurdish (but not Syriac). They do not show the national identifier "SYR", but do show "B*S" (Northern Syria) regional identifier. They consist of a Latin letter and 4 digits.

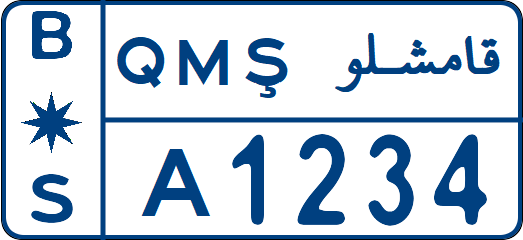

Commercial vehicles, such as buses, taxis, and trucks, have license plates with white background and red text.

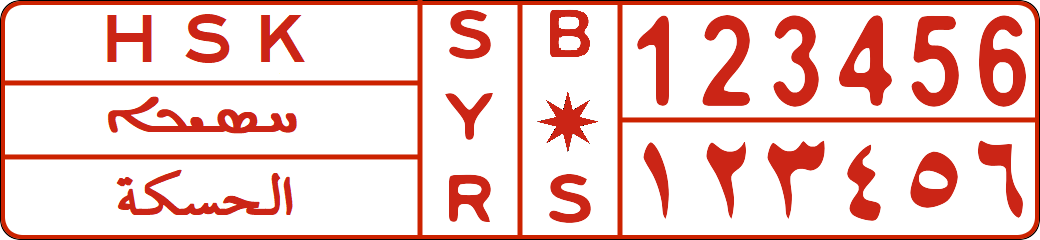

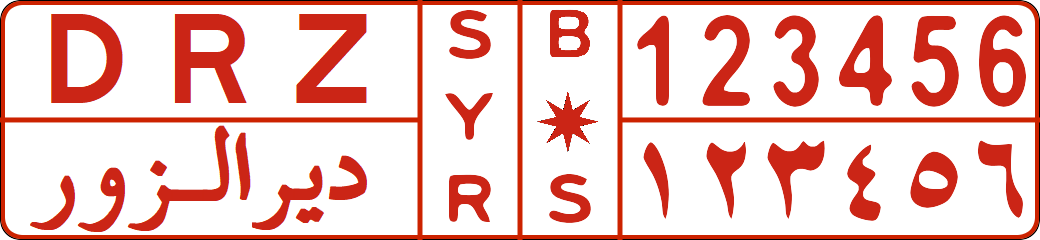

Vehicles of security forces, such as Asayish forces and Sutoro forces, have plates that are blue with white text.

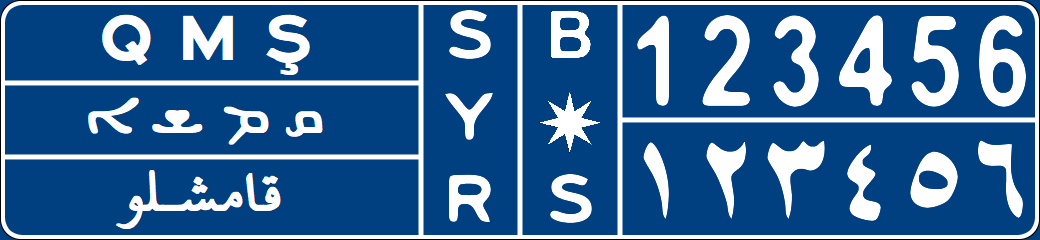

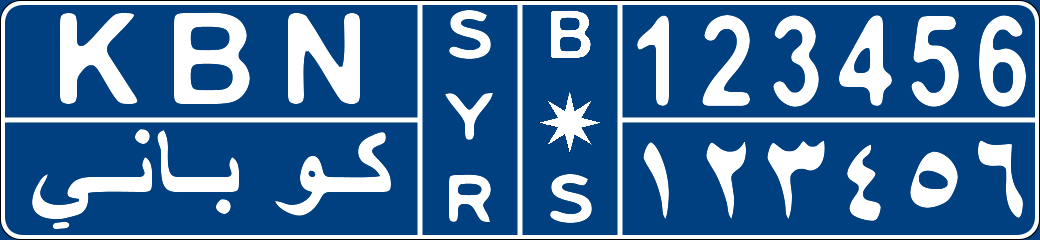

Administrative license plates, issued on municipal and other civilian governmental vehicles (like fire trucks and ambulances), have a green background and white text.

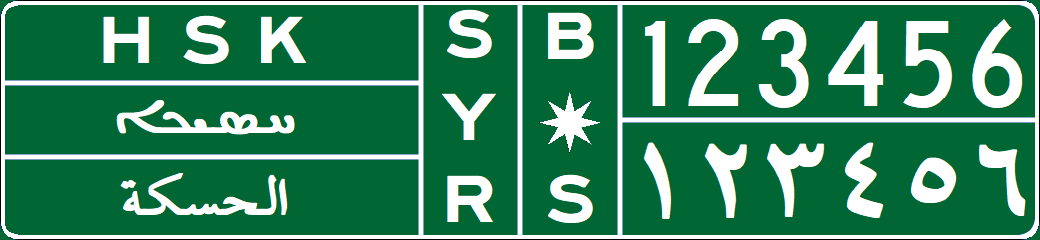

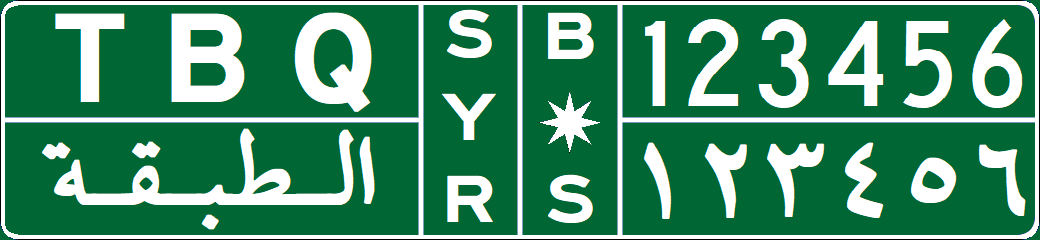

== Historical plates ==
=== Ba'athist Syria ===
The main license plate format in Syria, came into effect in 1997. As various regions of broke apart and established local governance independent from the Ba'athist rule, the widespread use of the national standard across Syrian territory gave way to different regionally-determined standard. Nevertheless, up until the fall of the Assad regime in December 2024, this license plate format was the main format being issued in regime-held areas of Syria.

However, starting from October 2024, Ministry of Transportation under Bashar al-Assad's regime started a process of introduction of a new license plate configuration. This license plate configuration is to be only in Latin (using the FE-Schrift font), is to feature the Syrian flag at the time and the country code "SYR". The format was to include 7 digits, and governorate name is to be removed.

The plan was to gradually, over a period of 3-years, expand from governorate to governorate, and expand in scope, until the entire country was covered. The first phase started in October 2024, covering Damascus Governorate and Damascus Countryside Governorate, and covering certain categories of transactions, including first-time registration, transfer of ownership, technical changes (except for locomotives and trailers), and more, but not yet a full replacement of all license plates in circulation.

In November 2024, this process was expanded to Latakia Governorate. This was the last major addition to the vehicle registration system under Ba'athist Syria, with the fall of the Assad regime happening only a month after.

==== 1997 series ====
Ba'athist-led Syrian license plates in 1997 had black lettering on a white background. The plate is divided into 4 sections (when viewed from left to right):

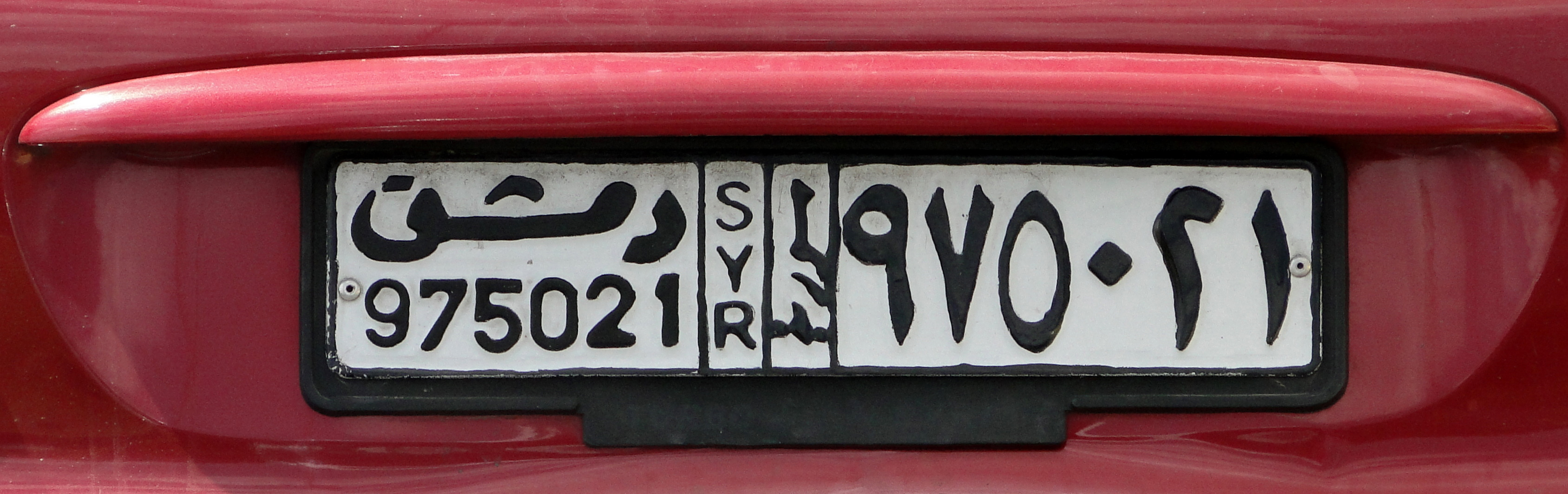
A Syrian license plate

- The left-most section: The name of the governorate in Arabic, below being the registration number (a maximum of 6 digits) in Arabic numerals. The governorates are listed in the table below.
- The vertical strip: the country code, written in the Latin script.
- The second vertical strip: "Syria" is written in the Arabic script.
- The right-most strip: The same registration number from the left-most area, written in Eastern Arabic numerals.

Private vehicles are black on white.

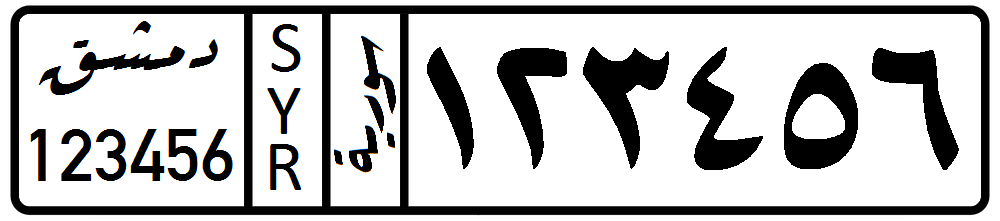

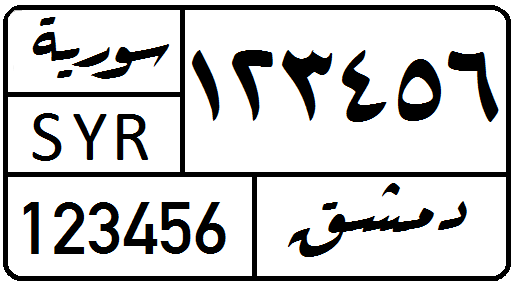

Governorate	Plate
Aleppo (حلب)	
Damascus (دمشق)	
Daraa (درعا)	
Deir ez-Zor (دیر الزور)	
Hama (حماة)	
Hasakeh (الحسکة)	
Homs (حمص)	
Idlib (ادلب)	
Latakia (اللاذقیة)	
Quneitra (القنيطرة)	
Raqqa (الرقة)	
Rif Dimashq (ریف دمشق)	
As-Suwayda (السویداء)	
Tartus (طرطوس)	

Privately owned and run public transit have license plates that are red on white.

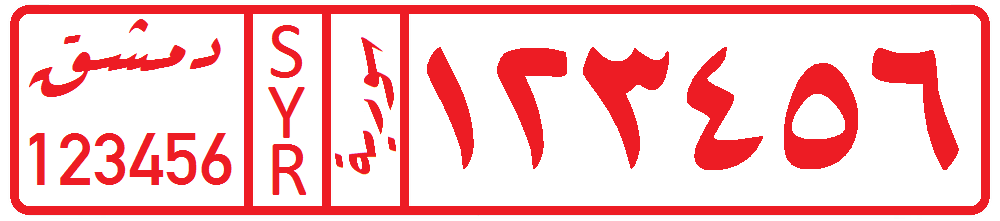

Publicly owned and run public transit have license plates that are black on red.

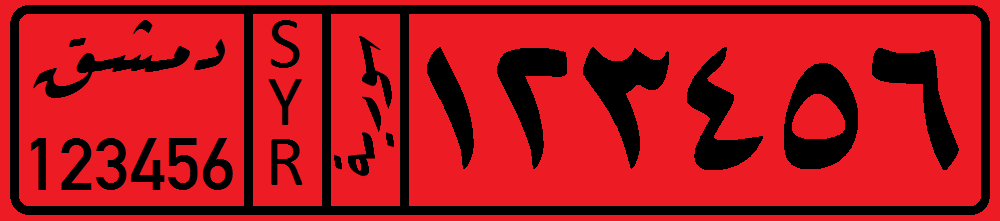

Rental vehicles with drivers have license plates that are white on blue.

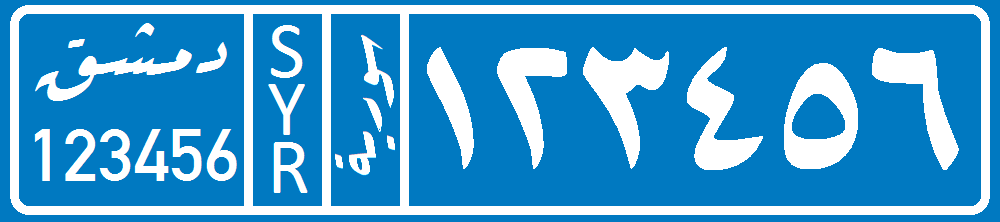

Rental vehicles without a driver have license plate with a mix of white on blue and black on white, similar to private vehicles.

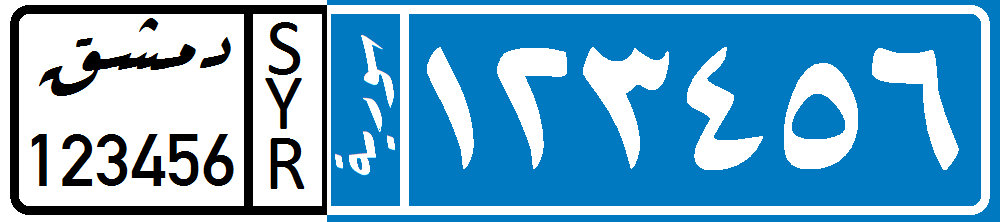

Transit vehicles license plates are black on yellow.

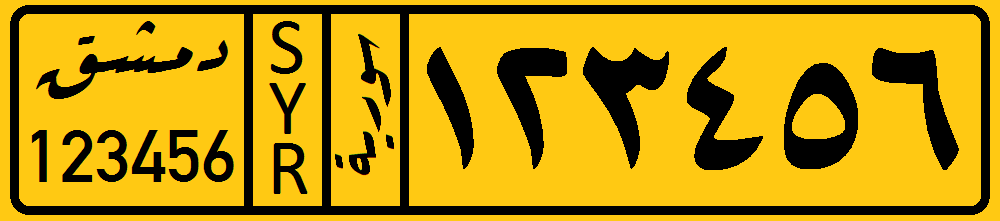

Motorcycle license plates are smaller in size, and are only in Arabic. They show the governorate name, and the term دارجة آلية, meaning motor bike. They have a white background and black text, and consist of a 5-digit number.

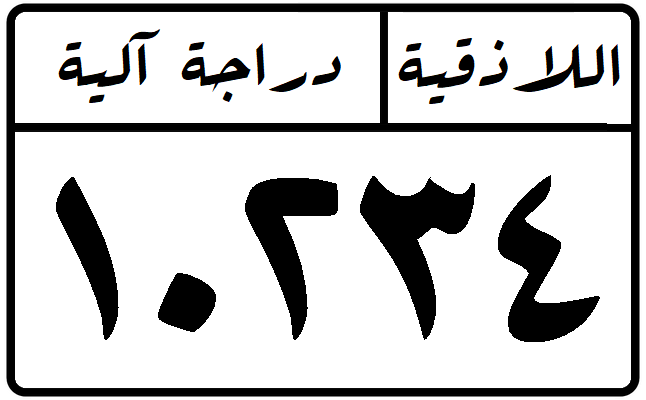

Agricultural license plates, installed on tractors and other farm equipment are smaller in size (same size as the motorcycle plates), and are only in Arabic. They show the governorate name, and the term زراعية, meaning agricultural. They have a white background and black text, and consist of a 5-digit number.

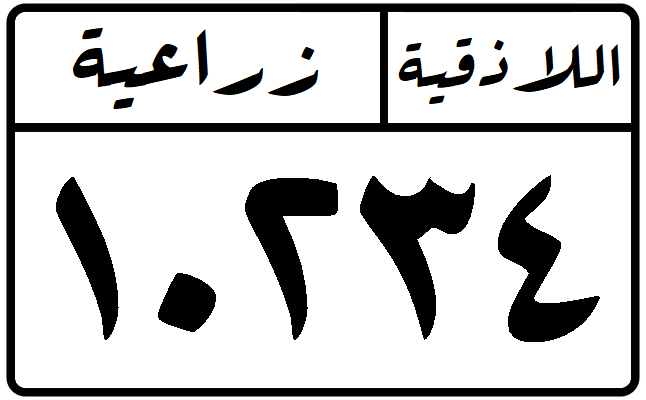

=== Syrian opposition-held territories ===
There are two distinct but cooperating political entities in Northern and Northwestern Syria that are generally referred to as the Syrian opposition; the Syrian Salvation Government is a de facto Hayat Tahrir al-Sham-dominated government headquartered in Idlib Governorate, controlling much of the governorate and small portions of western Aleppo Governorate, whilst the Syrian Interim Government is a Turkish-backed de facto and interim government established in the territories that the Turkish Army has occupied in Northern Aleppo Governorate, portions of Northern Raqqa Governorate and Northwestern Hasaka Governorate. Much of the territory these has been under rebel control as far back as 2012. Other portions, such as Northern Raqqa Governorate have only been recently occupied by Turkey and its allies recently (2019).

Both of these entities have started issuing their own license plates. However, despite similarities and cooperation between Syrian Salvation Government and the Turkish-backed Syrian Interim Government in Northern Syria, the two entities are separate, and thus issue separate license plates. This has caused difficulty for the citizens and has hindered freedom of movement in the rebel-held territories areas of Syria.

==== Syrian Salvation Government ====
The Syrian Salvation Government (SSG, Arabic: حكومة الإنقاذ السورية), a political entity effectively ran by Hayat Tahrir al-Sham, had ruled over much of Idlib Governorate, including its capital city of Idlib, and a small section of Aleppo Governorate, namely the two areas of Darat Izza and Atarib. (See Template:Syrian Civil War detailed map for more information).

The license plates for the area under the control of this entity are issued based on governorates, similar to the practice in areas under the rule of the Damascus-based government. However, the configuration and style has changed significantly. The name of the governorate is written in Arabic, on the right hand side. The "SYR" national identity strip has been maintained in the middle, but a 3-letter governorate identity strip has been added.

- IDL for Idlib Governorate
- ALP for Aleppo Governorate

The plates retained 6 digits, however the numerals were solely shown in Latin, and not in Arabic. The number is only shown on the left hand side.

Passenger vehicle plates have a white background and black text, similar to other existing configurations in Syria, including that of the Damascus-based government.

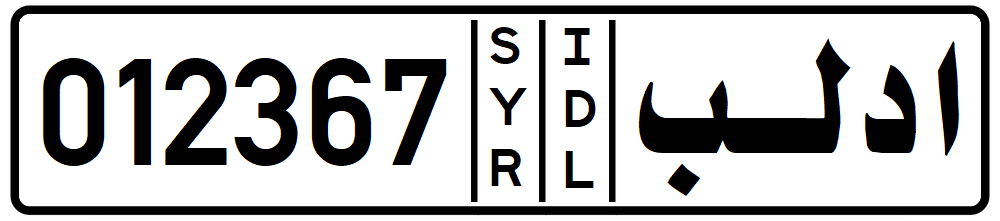

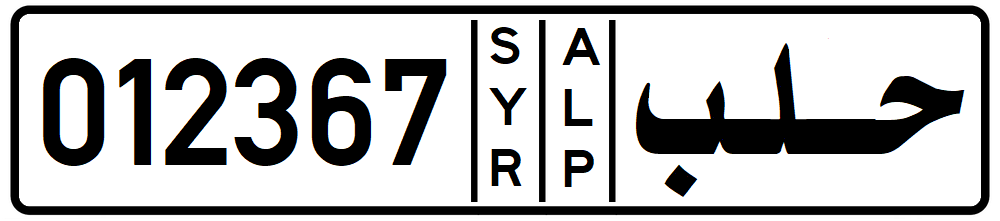

Commercial vehicle plates have a white background and red text.

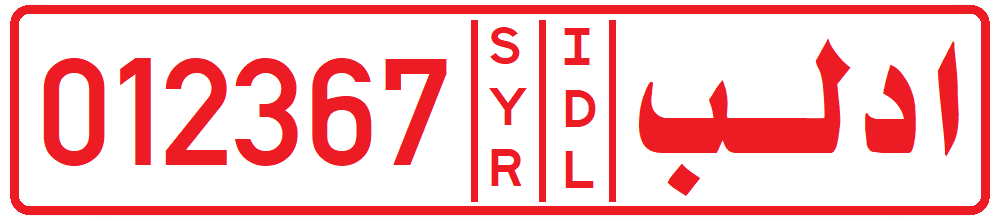

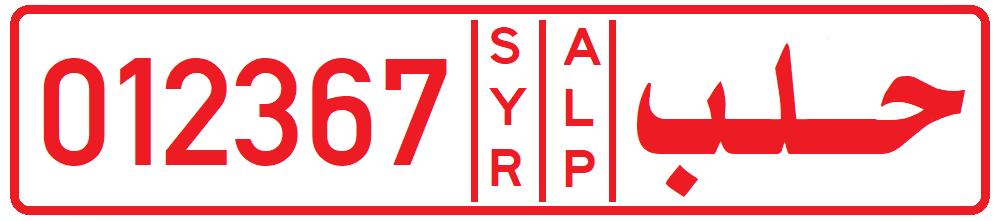

Police vehicle license plates do not show the governorate. They simply show the Arabic word "الشرطة" (Al-Shurta) meaning "Police". They have a yellow background and blue-coloured text. Their numbers consist of 4 digits.

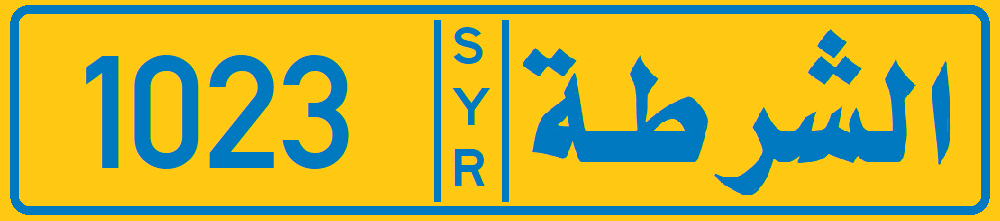

==== Syrian Interim Government ====
The Syrian Interim Government, a Turkish-backed political entity established after its invasion and occupation of portions of Aleppo Governorate, Raqqa Governorate, and Hasaka Governorate, had also introduced its own license plates as well. Turkish-backed Syrian Interim Government decided to start issuing its own license plates in great part due to the plan to integrate the vehicle registration database of the regions under its jurisdiction with the vehicle registration database of the Turkish National Police in each of the neighboring provinces.

Syrian Interim Government license plates are fully bilingual, displaying Arabic text and numbers, alongside Turkish text and numbers (and a complete exclusion of Kurdish in Turkish-occupied Afrin and Ras al-Ayn), in line with the Turkish policy of Turkification of the region.

License plates of Syrian Interim government no longer show the name or 3-letter code for Syria. They do show the name of the governorate in Arabic and in Turkish. Furthermore, they show the name of the "local council" in which the vehicle is registered. These "local councils" generally match Syrian subdistricts with exceptions such as Al-Bab Subdistrict that has been divided into three "local councils" of al-Bab, Bizaah, and Qabasin. Each subdistrict is also shown with a 3-letter Turkish code. The numbers on the plates are 5-digits, starting with 00001. While license plate configurations from localities in all of the three Turkish-occupied governorates of Aleppo, Raqqa, and Hasakah have the same elements and very similar configuration, their designs (font, orientation of text, size of letters, etc.) differ slightly.

Below are the list of local councils that were under SIG administration, their Arabic display names and their 3-letter Turkish display codes.

Jurisdiction	Arabic name	Turkish code
Aleppo Governorate
Afrin	عفرين	AFR
Akhtarin	اخترين	AHT
Al-Bab	الباب	BAB
Al-Ra'i	الراعي	ÇBY
Azaz	اعزاز	AZZ
Biza'ah	بزاعة	BZA
Ghandoura	غندورة	GDR
Jindires	جندريس	CIN
Maabatli	معبطلي	MAB
Mare'	مارع	MRA
Qabasin	قباسين	KBS
Rajo	راجو	RCU
Soran	صوران	SRN
Hasaka Governorate
Ras al-Ayn	رأس العين	RAS
Raqqa Governorate
Tell Abyad	تل أبيض	TEL

Passenger vehicle plates have a white background and black text, similar to other existing configurations in Syria, including that of the Damascus-based government.

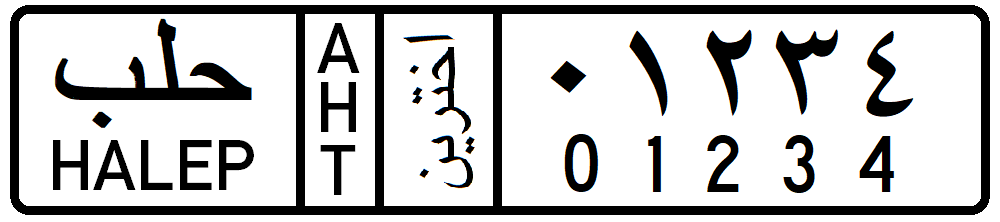

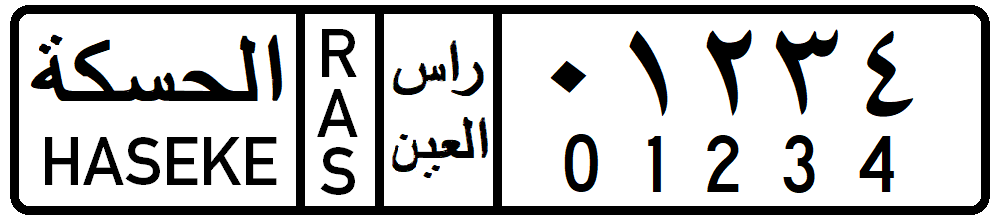

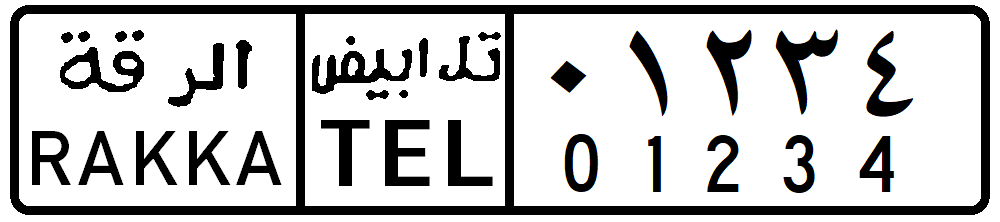

Motorcycle plates have smaller less elongated shape, and have a white background and black text.

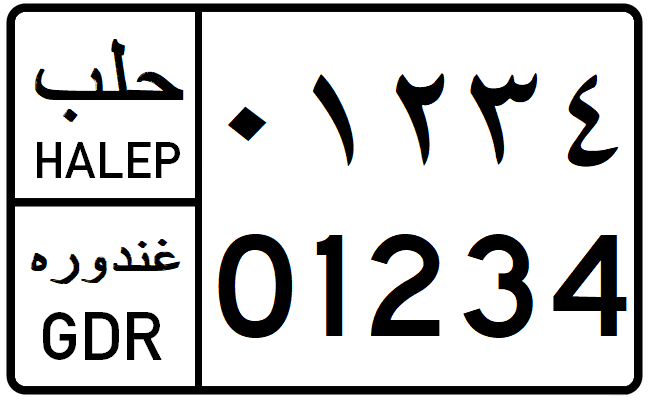

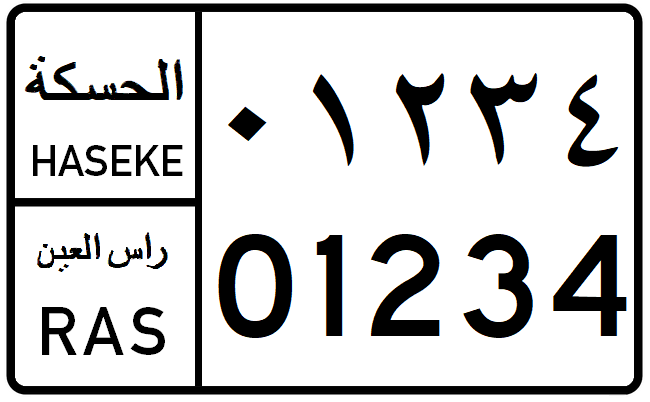

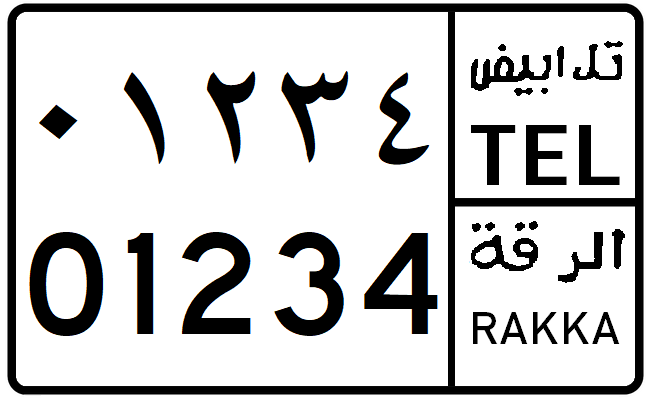

Commercial vehicle plates have a white background and red text.

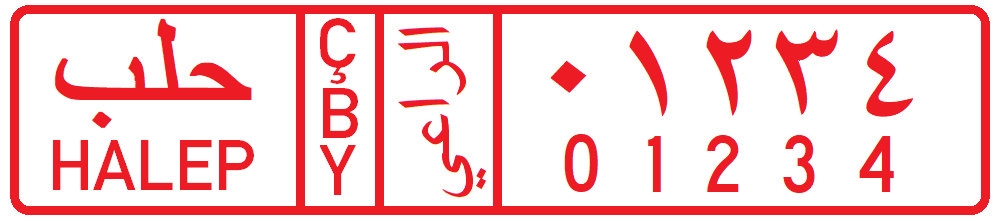

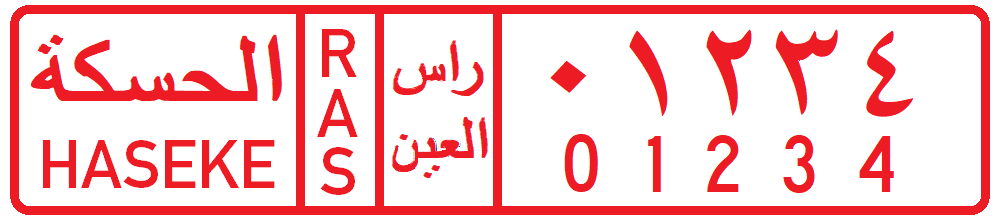

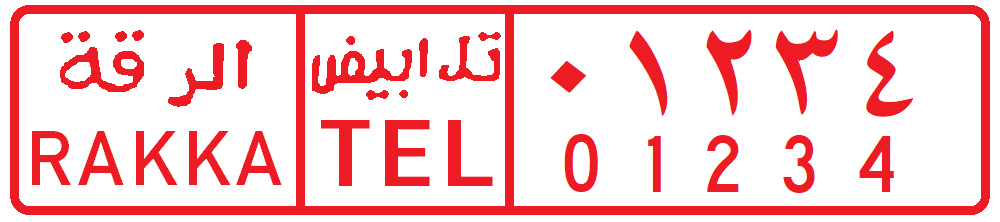

Administrative license plates, issued on municipal and other civilian governmental vehicles (like fire trucks and ambulances), have a black background and white text.

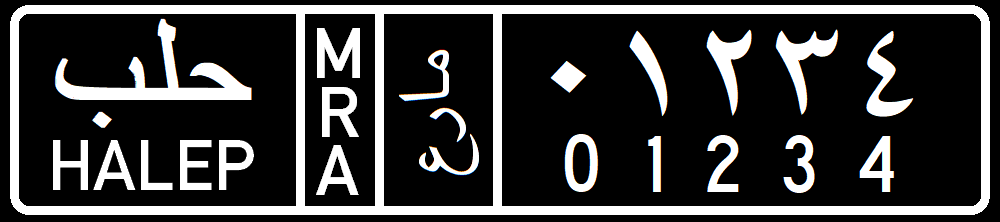

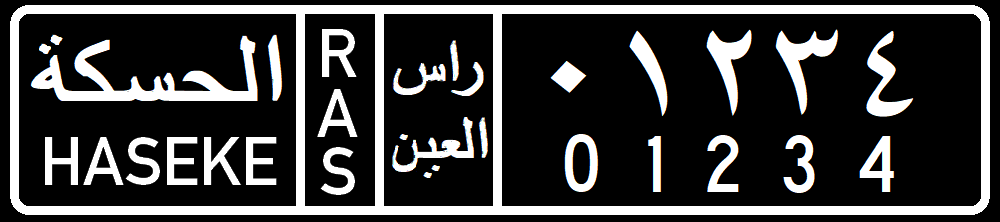

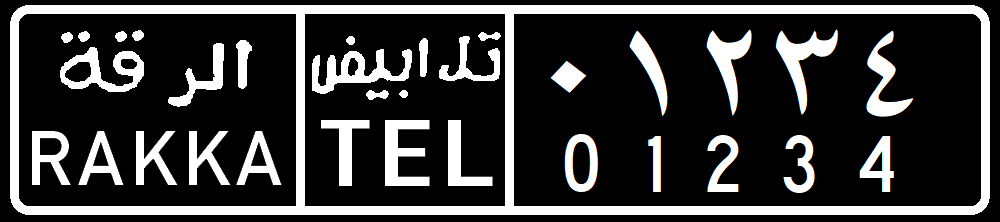

License plates issued to police and law enforcement vehicles and other such vehicles have a blue background and white text.

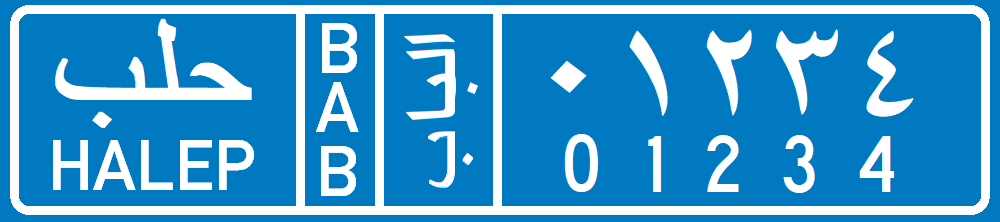

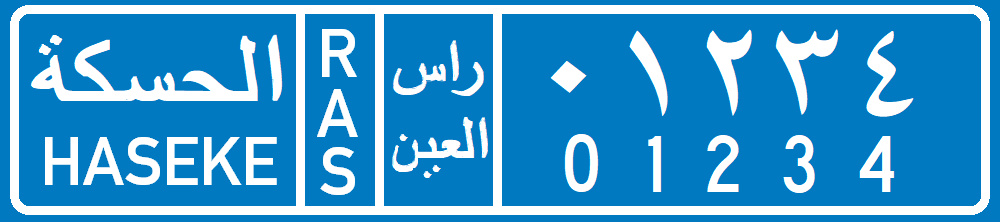

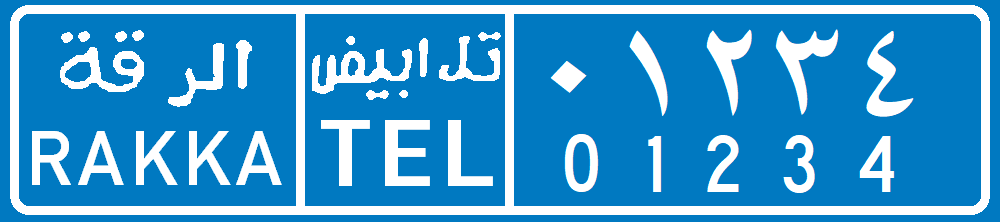

License plates installed on vehicles of "Syrian National Army" (SNA) also known as "TFSA" (Turkish-backed Free Syrian Army) have a green background and white text. These license plates do not display governorate and locality name, instead they show the name and logo of the "Syrian National Army" . These license plates display a 3-letter Turkish code "SMO", standing for the Turkish translation of the name of SNA Suriye Millî Ordusu.

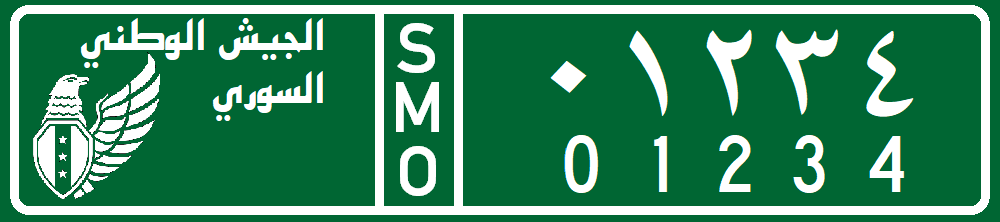

== Comparison of formats ==
=== Current formats ===
Classification	Syrian transitional government	AANES (Rojava)
Private		
Commercial		

=== Historical formats ===
Classification	Ba'athist Syria	AANES (Rojava)	SSG (HTS-dominated entity)	SIG (Turkish occupation)
Private				
Commercial				
