= Maqri =

Maqri المقري Al-Muqri
- Village
- Location of Maqri in Syria
- Coordinates: 36°23′48″N 37°36′31″E
- Country: Syria
- Governorate: Aleppo
- District: Al-Bab
- Subdistrict: Al-Bab

Population (2004)
  - Total: 1,468
- Time zone: UTC+3 (AST)
- Geocode: C1191

Maqri (Arabic: المقري) or Al-Muqri is a village in northern Aleppo Governorate, northwestern Syria. Located in the outskirts of Al Bab city, some 10 kilometres (6.2 mi) East of the city of Al-Bab. It is administratively part of the Al Bab Subdistrict (Nahiya) of Al-Bab District (Mantiqa). Nearby localities include Bizaah 5 km (3.1 mi) to the west and Qabasin 9 km (5.6 mi) to the northwest. In the 2004 census, Al-Muqri had a population of 1,468.
