= Al-Bab Military Council =

Force during the Syrian Civil War

- مجلس الباب العسكري
- Flag of the al-Bab Military Council
- Leader: Jamal Abu Juma
- Dates active: 14 August 2016 – present
- Groups: Al-Bab Revolutionary Front; Qebasin Martyrs Brigade; Army of Revolutionaries (elements); Seljuq Brigade; Al-Bab Countryside Martyrs Battalion; Free Arima Battalion; Martyr Silo al-Rai Brigade; Kieba Martyrs Brigade; Female Battalion
- Headquarters: Manbij (until 2024); Unknown (since 2024)
- Active regions: Manbij District and eastern al-Bab District (until 2024)
- Part of: Syrian Democratic Forces
- Wars: the Syrian Civil War

The al-Bab Military Council (BMC) is an ethnically mixed force of the Syrian Democratic Forces, consisting of Kurd, Arab, and Turkmen militias from northern Aleppo Governorate. During the civil war, the BMC maintained a presence in several villages west of Manbij, but its overt objective was to capture al-Bab, which was then under the control of the Syrian Interim Government.

== History ==
The al-Bab Military Council was formed on 14 August 2016 by seven small SDF-affiliated factions with the goal of capturing the city of al-Bab, which they described as "a symbol of the revolution and the foundation for a democratic, free and plural Syria". It called for US military support. Afrin-based SDF forces, cut off from the rest of the SDF by the Islamic State of Iraq and the Levant, launched an offensive in the countryside west of al-Bab in September. Amid the Battle of al-Bab and the wider Operation Euphrates Shield, the BMC fought alongside the People's Protection Units (YPG) against the Islamic State and the Turkish-backed Free Syrian Army (TFSA) in an attempt to capture al-Bab before Turkey did. The BMC and its allies were unable to reach the city. Since then, the BMC has frequently reiterated its intention to end the Turkish occupation of the region.

As clashes between the SDF and the Turkish-backed forces increased in March 2017, the SDF made a deal with the Syrian government and agreed to the posting of loyalist Syrian border guards in SDF-held areas to defuse tensions. The BMC coordinated with these border guards to counter attacks by the TFSA. The group maintained a presence in several villages that bordered on Turkish-held territories, and repeatedly clashed with Turkish-backed forces.

After the village of Arima was formally placed under Syrian Army control on 25 December 2018 following a deal between the SDF and the Syrian government, the BMC (along with the Manbij Military Council and Kurdish Front) was one of the SDF units which maintained a presence in the village. In early January 2019, several clashes took place between the Turkish-backed Syrian National Army (SNA, previously known as the TFSA) and the BMC near Arima. In response, BMC fighters, led by their commander Jamal Abu Juma, conducted joint patrols with Russian Armed Forces soldiers in the area where the joint SDF-Syrian Army zone bordered on Turkish-held territories. Sporadic fighting continued between the BMC and SNA.

== Structure ==
The BMC initially consisted of seven militias, two Arab units (Al-Bab Revolutionary Front and Free Arima Battalion), two Kurdish groups (Qebasin Martyrs Brigade and Kieba Martyrs Brigade), one Turkmen militia (Seljuq Brigade), and two ethnically mixed units (Al-Bab Countryside Martyrs Battalion and Martyr Silo al-Rai Brigade).

In October 2016, an all-female battalion was established. This unit started to recruit women among the refugees from al-Bab, especially those who had suffered at the hands of ISIL.

Jamal Abu Juma is the commander of the BMC. By February 2019, he had survived 15 assassination attempts.

== Bibliography ==
- Heing, Bridey (2018). Cultural Destruction by ISIS. The Crimes of ISIS. New York: Enslow Publishing. ISBN 9780766092150. LCCN 2017026280.
