= East Aleppo offensive (2017) =

Syrian military operation in January–April 2017

- Part of the Syrian civil war, the Turkish involvement in the Syrian Civil War, and the Russian military intervention in Syria
- Map of the wider campaigns in northern Aleppo as of 11 March 2017 Syrian Armed Forces and allied groups Syrian Democratic Forces Islamic State of Iraq and the Levant FSA groups and Turkish troops in Northern Syria
Date	17 January 2017 – 5 April 2017 (2 months, 2 weeks and 5 days)
Location	East Aleppo Governorate, Syria 36.3725°N 37.5178°E
Result	Syrian government victory: The Syrian Army captures the city of Dayr Hafir, the towns of Tadef and Al-Khafsah, and nearly 250 villages, cuts off the Turkish Army from advancing further into Syria, and secures the water supply to Aleppo; The SDF captures 14 villages from ISIL; Turkish-backed rebels capture 5 villages from ISIL and one or two from the SDF; The SDF allow the Syrian Army to enter 20 towns and villages bordering the frontline with rebel forces; Assault on Jirah Military Airbase halted because of Hama offensive launched by the rebels

Belligerents
(Syria) Syrian Arab Republic; Russia; Hezbollah Autonomous Administration of North and East Syria (27 Feb.–6 Mar.); Support: United States (against ISIL only)	Islamic State	(Syrian opposition) Hawar Kilis Operations Room (26 Feb.–6 Mar.); (Syrian opposition) Free Syrian Army; Sham Legion; Ahrar al-Sham (26 Feb.–6 Mar.); Turkey (1–6 Mar.)

Commanders and leaders
Maj. Gen. Suheil al-Hassan; Mohammed Mualla Adnan Abu Amjad (Manbij Military Council top commander); Ahmad Arsh (Manbij Revolutionaries Battalion commander)	Muhammad Al-Awad Hassan Al-Jam'ah † (Field commander)	(Turkey) Lt. Gen. Zekai Aksakallı (Operations chief commander) (Turkey) Lt. Gen. İsmail Metin Temel (Second Army commander)

Units involved
Syrian Armed Forces; Syrian Army; Tiger Forces; Syrian Arab Air Force; Military Intelligence Directorate; Forces of the Fighters of the Tribes; Russian Armed Forces; Aerospace Forces; Syrian Democratic Forces; Manbij Military Council; United States special operations forces (against ISIL only)	(Islamic State) Military of ISIL	Unknown

Strength
(Syria) 10,000 soldiers (pro-government claim) (United States) 300+ US soldiers, 50 armoured vehicles	Unknown	Unknown

Casualties and losses
(Syria) 72+ killed (anti-government claims) 20 captured 31 killed, 8 captured (per SDF); 71 killed (per Turkey)	(Islamic State) 650 killed	(Syrian opposition) 12–24 killed
- 26,000 civilians fled

The East Aleppo offensive (2017), also referred to as the Dayr Hafir offensive, was an operation launched by the Syrian Army to prevent Turkish-backed rebel forces from advancing deeper into Syria, and also to ultimately capture the ISIL stronghold of Dayr Hafir. Another aim of the operation was to gain control of the water source for Aleppo city, at the Khafsa Water Treatment Plant, in addition to capturing the Jirah Military Airbase. At the same time, the Turkish-backed rebel groups turned towards the east and started launching attacks against the Syrian Democratic Forces, west of Manbij.

== Offensive ==
=== Syrian Army push to al-Bab ===
On 17 January, the Syrian Army launched an assault led by its Tiger Forces, capturing a village to the south of al-Bab. The SAA captured four more villages to the south of the city within the next three days, and another 13 villages to the southwest of al-Bab between 21 and 24 January. By 29 January, 20 villages had come under Army control.

On 1 February, the Turkish-backed rebels captured two villages to the southwest of al-Bab, cutting the main road between the city and Aleppo from another side in front of the recent advances by pro-Syrian government forces who had come within 7 kilometres (4.3 mi). Meanwhile, the SAA also captured a village to the south of the Kuweires airbase.

By 5 February, the SAA was within two kilometers of cutting the last road into al-Bab, with support from Hezbollah and Russian artillery. The next day, they captured Tal Uwayshiya hill, which overlooks the main supply route to al-Bab. The SAA advance effectively cut off the last main supply route to the city, putting it under a siege. Government advances continued on 7 February, with SAA and Hezbollah capturing three villages and a nearby hill to the south of Al-Bab. They later captured a hill and many other sites to the south of the Kuweires airbase, extending their control over Sabkhat al-Jabbul and fully securing the road near it. Later on the same day, it was reported that the rapid Syrian Army advances had nearly encircled 5,000 ISIL militants within Al-Bab and its environs.

During the night of 7 February, Turkish forces and rebels launched an assault at Al-Bab, capturing several strategic hills and breaking into the city. On 9 February, the Syrian Army was within 3 kilometres (1.9 mi) of al-Bab. On the same day, the rebels clashed with the Syrian Army for the first time near al-Bab, in a village to the southwest of the city.

=== Syrian Army advance east of al-Bab ===
After the Syrian Army advanced within 1.5 kilometres (0.93 mi) of the city of al-Bab on 10 February, the next day, it was reported that Turkish-backed rebel forces had captured a strategic roundabout, effectively cutting off the Syrian Army from Al-Bab. To prevent further southern advances by the rebels, the military started operations east of Kuweires Airbase into ISIL territory so to cut off the rebels.

Between 12 and 16 February, the Syrian Army captured nine villages northeast of the airbase, advancing some four kilometres and coming within five kilometres of the ISIL-held town of Dayr Hafir.

Between 21 and 25 February, the military seized a dozen more villages and imposed artillery fire-control over Dayr Hafir. The Army started bypassing Dayr Hafir in an attempt to encircle it and force ISIL forces to withdraw instead of launching a direct assault on the town due to the possibility of extensive ISIL fortifications.

On 25 February, amid a large retreat of ISIL forces from rural areas of east Aleppo, and following the fall of Al-Bab to Turkish-backed rebel forces, it was reported that most of ISIL's fighters had withdrawn from the town of Tadef. At this point, it remained unclear whether the town would be taken over by pro-government or rebel fighters. The next day, the Syrian Army entered Tadef and took control of the town. Subsequently, clashes erupted near Tadef between the Army and Turkish-backed rebels. The rebels claimed that at least 22 Syrian soldiers were killed in the fighting, while at least six rebels also died. Still, despite this, the military continued with its advances, seizing another two villages.

Early on 27 February, government forces and Hezbollah seized another village from ISIL, bringing them within 5 or 6 kilometers from linking up with the Syrian Democratic Forces' Manbij Military Council and potentially besieging 13 ISIL-held villages. Later in the morning, the Syrian Army captured several more villages, reaching SDF lines. Turkish-backed rebels also took control of five villages after ISIL forces withdrew from those areas. The SDF then launched an assault against ISIL southwest and south of Manbij, capturing nine villages. It was reported that the SDF was planning to capture the town of Al-Khafsa from ISIL, as well as that the SDF and SAA may be coordinating their actions in the region.

=== Rebel attack on the SDF; SAA reaches Lake Assad ===
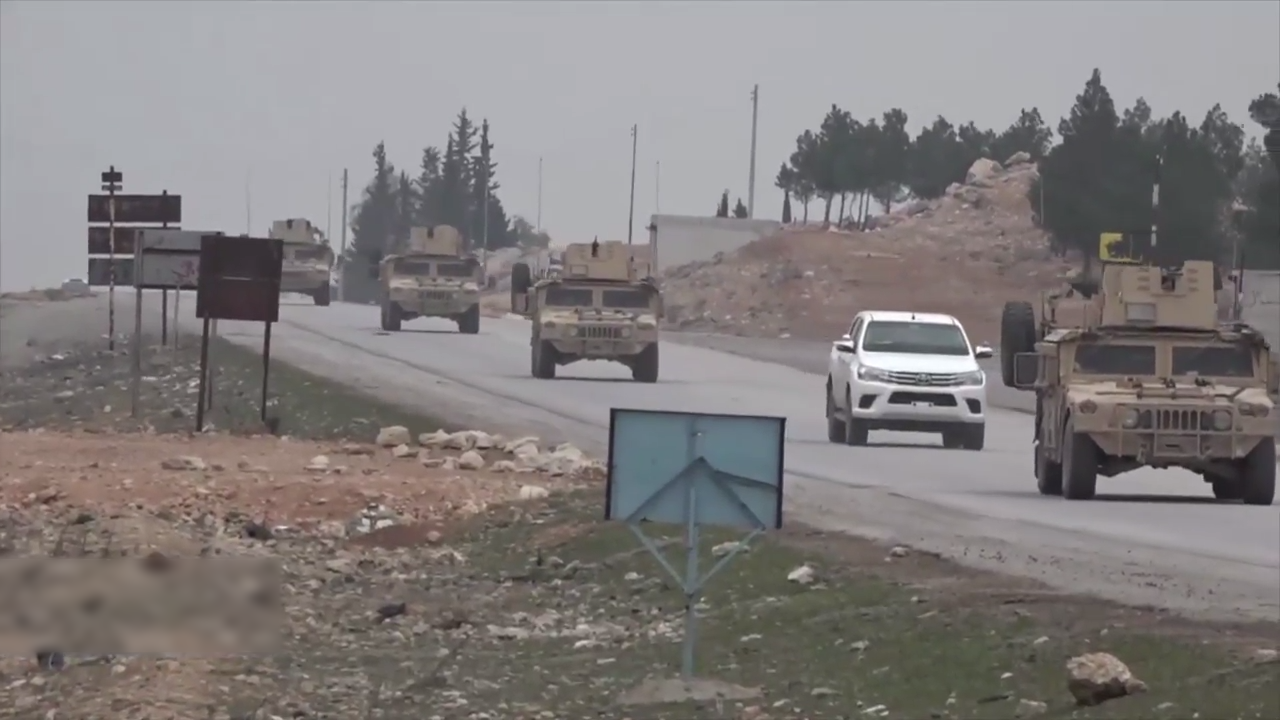
US Humvees drive through a SDF-controlled village near Manbij in an attempt to "deter" the skirmishes between the SDF and Turkish-backed forces.

On 28 February, both Syrian Army and SDF advances against ISIL continued with both sides capturing a total of five villages. Turkish-backed rebels meanwhile attacked the SDF near Arima and captured two villages. During the day, according to lieutenant general Stephen J. Townsend of the United States Army, the Russian Air Force accidentally bombed the Syrian Democratic Forces forces, mistaking them for ISIL fighters. The bombing caused casualties but was stopped after United States commandos nearby informed Russian forces of the error. On 1 March, the SDF captured five more villages from ISIL, while the Syrian Army took control of one more. Meanwhile, the Turkish-backed rebels made a push towards SDF-held Manbij and captured three villages from the SDF before the SDF recaptured them the following day. Six or 12 rebels were killed in the fighting, while the SDF lost four fighters.

On 2 March, the Manbij Military Council announced that it had reached an agreement with Russia to hand over villages to west of Manbij, bordering the frontline with rebel forces, to the Syrian government in the coming days. A YPG spokesman, meanwhile, stated that they hadn't sent any reinforcements to the area as they hadn't been requested. SDF also launched a counter-attack, retaking several villages that had been captured by the rebels a day earlier. The Syrian army and Hezbollah meanwhile continued advancing and captured 13 villages from ISIL by the next day. Russian General Staff's Sergey Rudskoy confirmed on 3 March that SDF had agreed to hand over villages to the west of Manbij to the Syrian government. He later stated that Syrian Army units had been deployed in these villages. The United States Department of Defense also confirmed the deal. On 4 March, United States special operations forces were also deployed in Manbij in response to the clashes. The United States military stated that its deployment was done to deter hostile acts, enhance governance, and ensure that there is no persistent YPG presence. Meanwhile, the Syrian Army, backed by Hezbollah and Russian artillery, captured 5 villages from ISIL, and another 8 on the next day.

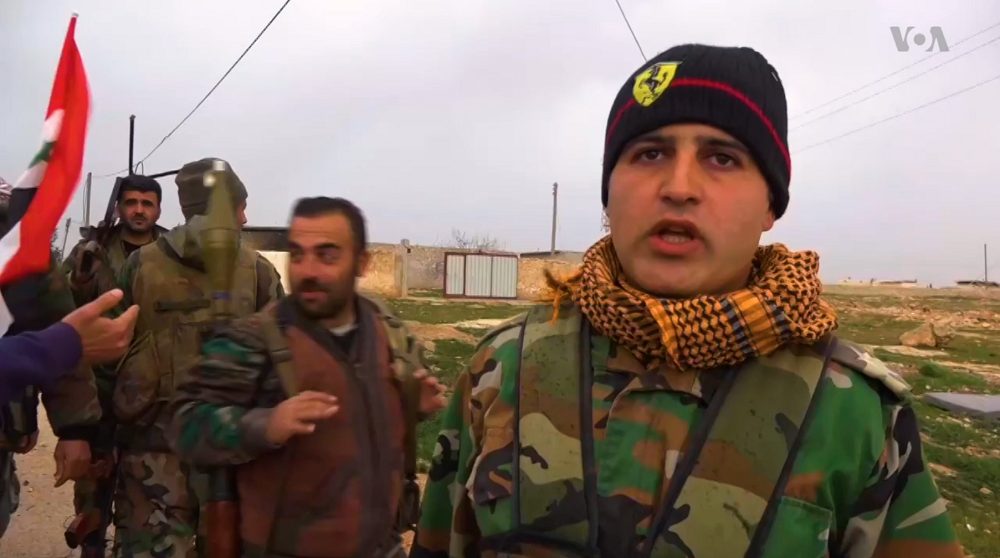
Syrian Army soldiers in a village west of Manbij, acting as peacekeepers.

On 6 March, the Syrian Army captured six villages from ISIL. Manbij Military Council meanwhile stated that Syrian Army had taken over positions on one part of its frontline with the Turkish-backed rebels. Pro-rebel media meanwhile claimed that the rebels had captured a village to the west of Manbij, pro-Kurdish media, however, rejected this, claiming the attack was repelled. On 6 March, it was also revealed that SDF forces were allowing the Syrian Army to enter 20 villages and towns along the frontline with rebel forces, after which they would reportedly withdraw. On 7 March, the Syrian Army captured 23 more villages in the Deir Hafer countryside along with the strategic Mount Salmah, the town of Khafsah and its water treatment station supplying the city of Aleppo, reaching the western bank of Lake Assad in the process for the first time since 2012. On the next day, the Syrian army captured 21 villages. On 9 March, the Syrian Army started attacking the strategic Jirah Military Airbase. However, by afternoon of 10 March their assault was repelled by ISIL which took advantage of a sandstorm to overrun Syrian Army north of the Airbase. During the offensive in the eastern countryside of Aleppo, from 17 January to 10 March, the Syrian Army recaptured 150 villages.

=== Syrian Army captures Dayr Hafir ===
The Tiger Forces abandoned attempts to capture Jirah Airbase, due to poor weather conditions, and instead decided to focus on villages east of the Kuweires Military Airport. On 13 March, the Syrian army captured the village of Humaymah Al-Kabira and stormed the northern part of Humaymah Al-Saghira capturing it after two hours of fighting, thus coming within 2 kilometres from the town of Dayr Hafir. On 14 March, the ISIL launched the counterattack in attempt to recaptures two villages from the Syrian army but it was repelled. Between 15 and 16 March, the Syrian army captured eight to nine villages near Dayr Hafir. On 17 March, the Syrian Army captured another 4 villages along with a hill near Dayr Hafir. On the next day, it captured 4 villages along with a strategic hill near Dayr Hafir. On 19 March, they captured a village as well as its surrounding farmlands to the south of Dayr Hafir. On the next day, the Syrian army captured another two villages along with a nearby train station, thus coming close to cutting off the main road between Dayr Hafir and Maskanah.

On 21 March, the Syrian Army captured another three villages to the south of the city Dayr Hafir. On the next day, the Syrian Army and Hezbollah captured the town of Umm Adasah in the countryside of Dayr Hafir, cutting off the Aleppo-Raqqa highway which was ISIL's main supply route. Later, the Syrian army captured four more villages in the countryside, nearly encircling ISIL at the city of Dayr Hafir, and leaving only one route open to the northeast for ISIL militants in the city to escape. On 23 March, the Syrian Army captured four villages to the east of Dayr Hafir, cutting off the last escape route, and completely besieging the city. There were also reports that the Syrian Army had captured Dayr Hafir after ISIL withdrew. Nevertheless, the Syrian Army have not entered yet the city of Dayr Hafir, but they were expected they do so, after Syrian and Russian de-mining units clear the town of ISIL explosives. On 24 March, mines and improvised explosive devices were cleared from the city, allowing the Syrian Army to enter and fully secure the city of Dayr Hafir. The Syrian Army also captured a village to the east Dayr Hafir on the same day. However, the Iranian Fars News Agency as well as the fact-checking Verify-sy reported that SAA was still besieging the city. In addition, a pro-government reporter also posted denial by a field commander of the city's capture.

On 25 March, the Turkish-backed rebels reportedly took control of the town of Tadef after a Syrian Army withdrawal from the town. However, the Syrian Army and the Sultan Murad Division denied these reports later. On the same day, the Syrian Army captured two more villages in the eastern Aleppo countryside, to the east of Dayr Hafir. Despite some earlier reports to the contrary, large parts of Dayr Hafir remained off-limits to the Syrian Army, since ISIL left behind improvised explosives in almost every building and street, which have not yet been completely cleared. On 26 March, the Syrian Army advanced further eastward, capturing another 4 villages. Another village along the Aleppo-Raqqa highway was captured on the next day, with the Syrian Army advancing on the strategic town of al-Mahdum. On 28 March, the Syrian army captured another four villages along with a hill.

On 29 March, the Syrian army officially entered and fully secured the town of Dayr Hafir for the first time after demining most of the explosives and IEDs planted by ISIL at the entrance of the town. A military source announced that they had captured the town.

=== Advance on Jirah Airbase ===
The Syrian Army started clashing with ISIL around Jirah Airbase on 30 March, with ISIL trying to hold them off from progressing into the Raqqa Governorate. Clashes continued the next day, while both sides were unable to make any progress. On 1 April, ISIL repelled an SAA assault on Madhum village, located on the M4 Highway, by sending an elderly suicide bomber at the soldiers, killing 11 of them. The Syrian Army captured three villages near the airbase between 3 and 5 April.

== Aftermath – Sporadic fighting continues and renewed offensive southward ==
Between 10 and 17 April, sporadic clashes and air raids took place around the Jirah airbase as the Syrian Army had temporarily paused the offensive because of the rebel offensive in northern Hama. ISIL's Inghimasi unit carried out a raid on forward positions of SAA near the Jabbul Lake on 17 April, killing many Syrian soldiers. ISIL's Amaq News Agency claimed that 17 soldiers were killed.

On 8 May, the SAA resumed their offensive operations in the region, advancing towards the Jirah Airbase. On 12 May, the SAA captured the Jirah Airbase from ISIL, with the ISIL militants retreating southward into the Maskanah Plains. On 13 May, ISIL counterattacked at the Jirah Airbase, attempting to recapture the airbase from Syrian Government forces. However, the SAA repelled the ISIL assault and advanced further, capturing additional areas to the south of the Jirah Airbase.

== Strategic analysis ==
After the Syrian Army severed the last strip of territory in eastern Aleppo that connected Turkish-backed rebels with ISIL, it was speculated by Al-Masdar News writer Chris Tomson that the rebels would either attack the Syrian Army or the Kurdish-led Syrian Democratic Forces (SDF) if they were to advance deeper into Syria. Any such further acts would put Turkey at odds with either the United States or Russia. A trade route between Syrian government and SDF-held areas was opened at the end of February, with goods and services being exchanged between the two areas, and relatives being able to visit each other. Abdul Karim Saroukhan, head of the Kurdish-led administration, stated that the opening of a corridor to the Syrian Government-controlled west will have a positive impact and open new trade opportunities for the Kurdish region that had been under a "siege" by hostile parties, though advances in East Aleppo province by the Syrian Army had led to tensions with YPG in some areas. He also stated that there were no contacts with the Syrian Government over trade. The capture of Dayr Hafir has let the door wide open for a Syrian attack into the Raqqa Governorate, with the only obstacles being the Jirah Airbase and Maskanah. By 28 March, it looks inevitable that Jirah will fall, bringing with it the highly arable Dayr Hafir plain under the Syrian Army's full control, improving food security for Syria's citizens, and reaching the final defensive line for ISIL in east Aleppo, the narrow Thermopylae-like gap of the Maskanah plains.

== Gallery ==
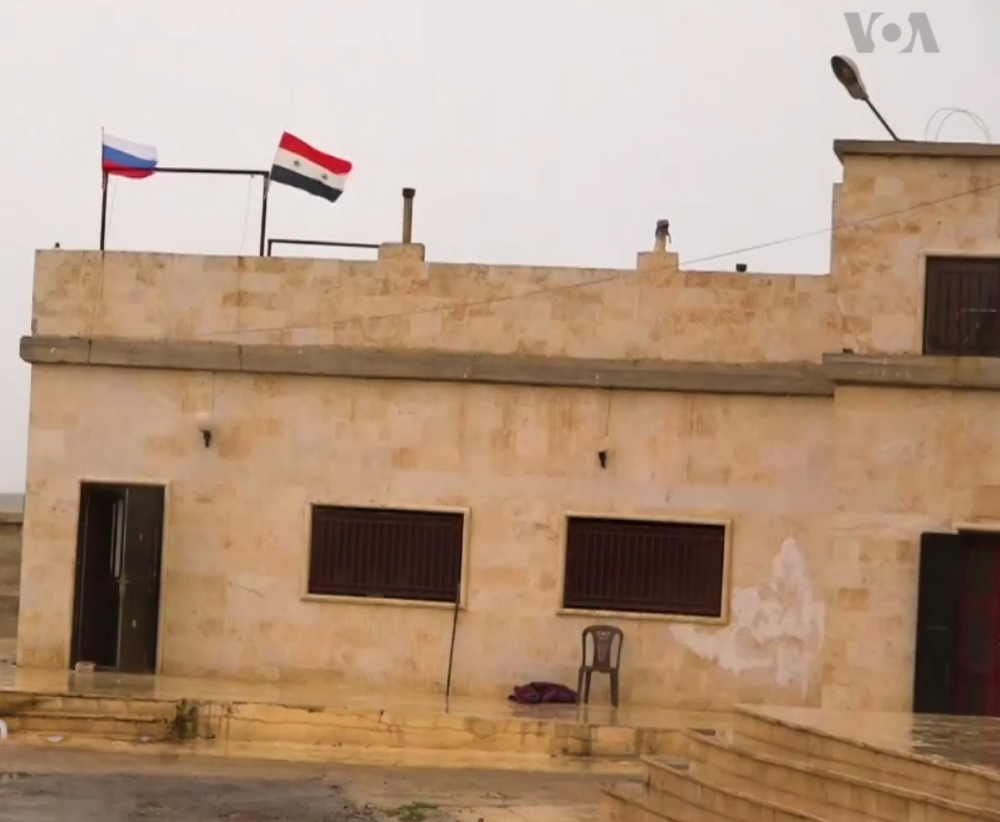
A joint base of Russia and the Syrian Arab Army in the border area between the SDF and the pro-Turkish forces.

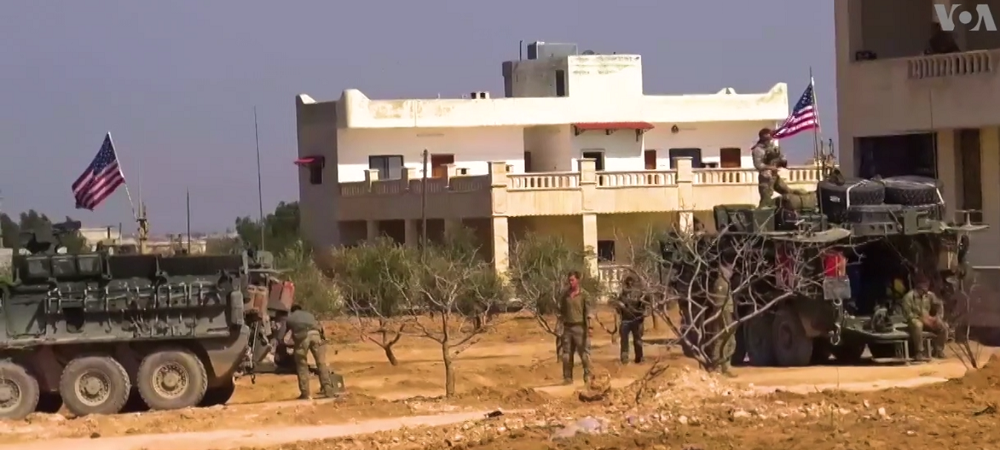
United States special operations forces near Manbij.
