= Maran, Syria =

Maran مران
- Town
- Location of Maran in Syria
- Coordinates: 36°16′27″N 37°21′04″E
- Country: Syria
- Governorate: Aleppo
- District: al-Bab
- Subdistrict: al-Bab

Population (2004)
  - Total: 3,670
- Time zone: UTC+2 (EET)
  - Summer (DST): UTC+3 (EEST)
- Geocode: C1210

Maran (Arabic: مران; also spelled Marran) is a town in northern Syria, in the west of the Al-Bab District of Aleppo Governorate, about halfway between the cities of Al-Bab and Aleppo. On 22 January 2017, Maran was captured by Government forces.
