= Hezwan =

Hezwan حزوان
- Village
- Location of Hezwan in Syria
- Coordinates: 36°24′35″N 37°24′13″E
- Country: Syria
- Governorate: Aleppo
- District: al-Bab
- Subdistrict: al-Bab

Population (2004)
  - Total: 1,579
- Time zone: UTC+2 (EET)
  - Summer (DST): UTC+3 (EEST)
- Geocode: C1191

Hezwan (Arabic: حزوان) or Hazwan is a village in northern Aleppo Governorate, northwestern Syria. Located in the Aqil mountains, some 25 kilometres (16 mi) northeast of the city of Aleppo and 10 km (6.2 mi) northwest of al-Bab, it is administratively part of Nahiya al-Bab of al-Bab District. Nearby localities include Sosyan 4 km (2.5 mi) to the northeast and Ablah 5 km (3.1 mi) to the northwest. In the 2004 census, Hezwan had a population of 1,579.
