= Tell Rahal =

Tell Rahal تل رحال
- Village
- Location of Tell Rahal in Syria
- Coordinates: 36°20′37″N 37°23′13″E
- Country: Syria
- Governorate: Aleppo
- District: al-Bab
- Subdistrict: al-Bab

Population (2004)
  - Total: 2,866
- Time zone: UTC+2 (EET)
  - Summer (DST): UTC+3 (EEST)
- Geocode: C1205

Tell Rahal (Arabic: تل رحال) is a village located 25 km (16 mi) northeast of the city of Aleppo in northern-central Aleppo Governorate, northwestern Syria. It is administratively part of Nahiya al-Bab in al-Bab District. The village had a population of 2,866 as per the 2004 census. It is inhabited by both Kurds and Arabs.

== Syrian civil war ==
On 24 January 2017, the Syrian Army captured the village from Islamic State of Iraq and the Levant.
