= Sosyan =

Sosyan سوسيان
- Village
- Location of Sosyan in Syria
- Coordinates: 36°26′06″N 37°26′31″E
- Country: Syria
- Governorate: Aleppo
- District: al-Bab
- Subdistrict: al-Bab

Population (2004)
  - Total: 1,452
- Time zone: UTC+2 (EET)
  - Summer (DST): UTC+3 (EEST)
- Geocode: C1187

Sosyan (Arabic: سوسيان) or Susiyan is a village in northern Aleppo Governorate, northwestern Syria. Located in the Aqil mountains, some 25 kilometres (16 mi) northeast of the city of Aleppo and 9 km (5.6 mi) northwest of al-Bab, it is administratively part of Nahiya al-Bab of al-Bab District. Nearby localities include Hezwan 4 km (2.5 mi) to the southwest and Qubbet Elsheikh 7 km (4.3 mi) to the northeast. In the 2004 census, Sosyan had a population of 1,452.
