= Heba Haj Aref =

Syrian human rights activist (1991–2024)

- هبة حاج عارف
- Born: 1991; Syria
- Died: 26 February 2024 (aged 32–33); Bizaah, Aleppo Governorate, Syria
- Cause of death: Asphyxiation
- Education: University of Aleppo
- Occupations: Human rights activist Teacher

Heba Suhaib Haj Aref (Arabic: هبة صهيب حاج عارف; c. 1991–2024) was a Syrian human rights activist known for her advocacy for women during the Syrian civil war, particularly in northwestern Syria. In 2024, she was found dead; while the official investigation ruled her death a suicide, human rights groups have stated that she was murdered because of her activism.

== Life and activism ==
Haj Aref studied law at the University of Aleppo before settling in Bizaah, Aleppo Governorate, where she lived with her husband and children. In May 2023, she was elected to serve on Bizaah Municipal Council. At the time of her death, Haj Aref worked as a senior teacher at al-Ikhwa Elementary School, a boys' school affiliated with Yeni Adam.

Haj Aref was a women's rights activist and a member of numerous Syrian women's groups, including the Women's Protection Network, the Women's Support and Empowerment Unit, the Women's Feminist Movement, and the Syrian Women's Network; she was also a member of the Syrian National Democratic Alliance Party. As a result of her activism, Haj Aref had received threats from different military groups operating in northwestern Syria, who had accused her of being a supporter of Bashar al-Assad and had called on her to resign from her positions on both Bizaah Municipal Council and with Yeni Adam; she ultimately resigned from the former. Haj Aref reported an online smear campaign against her to local police controlled by the al-Hamza Division, which opted not to investigate further.

== Death and investigation ==
On 26 or 27 February 2024, Haj Aref's body was found by her family at her home in Bizaah; it was variously reported in local media that she had been found strangled, hanged, or that she had been strangled before being hanged by a noose. Due to the ongoing conflict in the area, multiple security forces operated in Bizaah, including separate forces associated with the Syrian Interim Government and the Syrian National Army. The al-Bab Security Directorate, associated with the SIG, investigated Haj Aref's death, arrested 17 suspects on 28 February; it stated that none of the suspects were associated with any military factions. Abdurrahman Mustafa, president of the Syrian Interim Government, visited Aref's family to express his condolences. On 4 March, al-Bab announced that Haj Aref's uncle, identified as her guardian due to her husband being disabled and her father living outside of SIG-controlled areas, had declined an autopsy taking place, and that medical oversight by a team of doctors ruled that she had died due to a lack of blood supply brain, declaring her death to be a suicide and releasing the 17 individuals who had previously been arrested. The Syrian National Army did not complete its own investigation.

The initial declaration by the Syrian Interim Government that none of the suspects arrested for Haj Aref's death were in militias, despite a history of her receiving threats from them, and its subsequent ruling that her death was a suicide, was criticised by human rights groups in Syria and internationally. The Syrian Network for Human Rights stated its belief that Haj Aref had been murdered, expressing its solidarity for her family and calling on the SIG, the National Coalition of Syrian Revolutionary and Opposition Forces and the Syrian National Army to launch a "thorough, independent and transparent" investigation into Haj Aref's death. A coalition of Syrian feminist groups including the Syrian Women's Political Movement linked Haj Aref's killing to "constant death threats from the de facto armed forces" and stated that the SIG and the Syrian National Coalition should "fully bear responsibility" for her death and commit to a "comprehensive, independent, international investigation". The Syrian Future Movement disagreed with the suicide verdict, calling Haj Aref's death a "mafia-style assassination", accusing authorities of "obscuring the truth".

The European Center for Constitutional and Human Rights attributed Haj Aref's death to "pro-Turkish militias" and expressed its sympathy for her children. In the United Kingdom, Baroness Anderson of Stoke-on-Trent mentioned Aref's death in a session commemorating International Women's Day on 8 March 2024. The German Special Envoy to Syria, Stefan Schneick, expressed his shock at Aref's death and called for those responsible to be held accountable, remembering Aref as a "courageous fighter for women's rights".
