= Arima Subdistrict =

Arima Subdistrict ناحية عريمة
- Subdistrict
- Location of Arima Subdistrict within Aleppo Governorate

- Location in Syria
- Coordinates (Arima): 36°26′21″N 37°40′09″E
- Country: Syria
- Governorate: Aleppo
- District: al-Bab
- Seat: Arima

Area
  - Total: 317.38 km^{2} (122.54 sq mi)

Population (2004)
  - Total: 32,041
  - Density: 100.95/km^{2} (261.47/sq mi)
- Geocode: SY020203

Arima Subdistrict (Arabic: ناحية عريمة, romanized: Nāḩiyat Arima) is a subdistrict of al-Bab District in northern Aleppo Governorate, northwestern Syria. The administrative centre is Arima. At the 2004 census, the subdistrict had a population of 32,041.

== Cities, towns and villages ==
Cities, towns and villages of Arima Subdistrict
PCode	Name	Population
C1329	Arima	2,839
C1339	Sukkariyah Kabira	2,437
C1322	Sukkariyah Saghira	2,332
C1331	Iylan	2,117
C1333	Qanli Quyu	1,550
C1346	Barshaya	1,448
C1344	Shuwayhah	1,375
C1325	Hajaliyah	1,211
C1338	Orubah	1,186
C1348	Bir Tafreeah	1,089
C1330	Kreidiyeh	1,037
C1337	Jeb Naassan	1,011
C1350	Madiq Bu Azar	876
C1327	Jurneyyeh	829
C1343	Shdar	778
—N/a	Birazia	774
C1349	Big Nabata	764
C1335	Jeb Sultan	741
C1340	Jablet Elhamra	736
C1341	Um Shakif	691
—N/a	Al-Dhdhib	678
C1342	Um Adae Ajami	675
C1328	Olasha	632
C1347	Little Tafreeah	622
—N/a	Al-Buwwaihij	607
C1326	Omyaniye - Korhyok	518
C1334	Wadi - Little Jqal	425
C1332	Sunbula - Saboyran	392
C1345	Tarhin	392
—N/a	Ajami	385
C1323	Hota	327
C1324	Mazrufeh	288
—N/a	Qanafidah	198
C1336	Thalabiyeh - Big Jqal	81
