= Qabasin =

Qabasin قباسين Başköy (باش كوي)
- Town
- Location of Qabasin in Syria
- Coordinates: 36°26′09″N 37°34′06″E
- Country: Syria
- Governorate: Aleppo
- District: al-Bab
- Subdistrict: al-Bab

Population (2004)
  - Total: 11,382
- Time zone: UTC+2 (EET)
  - Summer (DST): UTC+3 (EEST)
- Geocode: C1209

Qabasin (Arabic: قبّاسين, romanized: Qabbāsīn, Turkish: Başköy) is a town located northeast of the city of Al-Bab in northern Syria. It is administratively part of the Al-Bab nahiya in the Al-Bab District of the Aleppo Governorate. 11,382 people lived in the town in 2004. A nearby town is Arima, to the north-east. The town is inhabited by Turkmen and Arabs.

== Syrian civil war ==
During the Syrian civil war, the town was initially captured by the Syrian opposition and later by ISIL. On 23 February 2017, the Syrian National Army and the Turkish Armed Forces captured the town from ISIL as well as the nearby towns of B'zaa and al-Bab after months of fighting as part of the Euphrathes Shield operation.
