= Al-Bab Subdistrict =

Al-Bab Subdistrict ناحية مركز الباب
- Subdistrict
- Location of Al-Bab Subdistrict within Aleppo Governorate

- Location in Syria
- Coordinates (al-Bab): 36.4031°N 37.4606°E
- Country: Syria
- Governorate: Aleppo
- District: al-Bab
- Seat: al-Bab

Area
  - Total: 489.28 km^{2} (188.91 sq mi)

Population (2004)
  - Total: 112,219
  - Density: 229.36/km^{2} (594.03/sq mi)
- Geocode: SY020200

Al-Bab Subdistrict, also called Nahiya Markaz al-Bab (Arabic: ناحية مركز الباب), is a subdistrict of al-Bab District in northern Aleppo Governorate, northwestern Syria. Administrative centre is al-Bab. At the 2004 census, the subdistrict had a population of 112,219.

== Cities, towns and villages ==
Cities, towns and villages of Al-Bab Subdistrict
PCode	Name	Population
C1202	al-Bab	63,069
C1188	Bizaah	12,718
C1209	Qabasin	11,382
C1210	Maran	3,670
C1205	Tell Rahal	2,866
C1191	Hezwan	1,579
C1193	Maqri	1,468
C1187	Sosyan	1,452
C1200	Saflaniyeh	1,353
C1214	Qubbet Elsheikh	1,274
C1194	Aabad	1,213
C1197	Suran	1,041
C1190	Su Sinbat	939
C1211	Qdeiran	850
C1206	Shdud	772
C1189	Shaala	757
C1198	Hadath	751
C1204	Olan	689
C1199	Tal Jerji	689
C1213	Noman	657
C1196	Sheikh Elwan	557
C1195	Sheikh Jarrah	535
C1207	Sheikh Kif	432
C1186	Nayrabiyeh	416
C1208	Qemmet Daghelbash	304
C1203	Big Sarja	237
C1192	Borj	236
C1201	Um Elamad Elbab	200
C1212	Waqqah	113
