= Tadef =

Tadef تادف
- Town
- Location of Tadef in Syria
- Coordinates: 36°20′53″N 37°31′48″E
- Country: Syria
- Governorate: Aleppo
- District: al-Bab
- Subdistrict: Tadef

Population (2004)
  - Total: 12,360
- Time zone: UTC+2 (EET)
  - Summer (DST): UTC+3 (EEST)

Tadef (Arabic: تادف; also spelled Tedef or Tadif) is a town southeast of Al-Bab, about 20 miles (32 km) east of Aleppo, Syria and less than 3 kilometers (1.9 mi) south of Al Bab. The town, which is the site of a shrine to the Jewish prophet Ezra (c. 400 BCE), was a popular summer resort for the Jews of Aleppo.

== History ==
The village was inhabited during the 19th century by Arabs belonging to the Aneyzeh tribe. During the late 1800s, the village came under repeated attack by nomadic tribes who wished to steal sheep and cattle from the surrounding plains. Casualties were reported as the villagers were able to muster over 400 armed men to defend their flocks and herds. At the time, about 20 Jewish families lived in the village, which was described as a "Jewish town". Before the festival of Shavuot, Jews from Aleppo made an annual pilgrimage to the village.

In 1931, there were 15 Jewish families living in the town.

On 30 November 2024, the SNA forces captured the town. The pro-Turkish forces' control over the area did not end until the SIG was incorporated into the Syrian caretaker government at the end of January 2025.

== Association with Ezra ==
Local tradition maintains that Ezra (c. 400 BCE) paused in the town on his way from Babylon to Jerusalem and built the synagogue which still stands today. In 1899, Max Freiherr von Oppenheim discovered 14th-century Hebrew inscriptions at the synagogue. There is a spring near the town called Ein el-Uzir, where it is said Ezra regularly immersed himself during his sojourn there. A tomb ascribed to Ezra is also located in the town and has been intact for many centuries. On a pilgrimage to Jerusalem in 1414, Issac Elfarra of Málaga was informed:

At a distance of two (sic) miles from [Aleppo] is the tomb of Ezra the Scribe. There Ezra recorded the Torah... This village is called Taduf [and contains] a synagogue... They [also] say that every night year round a cloud ascends from the tomb of Ezra never departing.

There is also another tomb attributed to Ezra near Basra, Iraq.
