= 2017 Russian Air Force Al-Bab incident =

Airstrike in Syria

The 2017 Russian Air Force Al-Bab incident occurred when three Turkish soldiers were killed and 11 injured after a Russian Air Force Tupolev Tu-22M attacked Turkish soldiers accidentally during Operation Spring Shield in al-Bab, Syria.

== Strike ==
A Tupolev Tu-22M flying a strike mission against a building in al-Bab, Syria suspected of containing Islamic State fighters, dropped a bomb on a Turkish army position. The bombing killed 3 Turkish troops and injured 11 others. Turkish military officials called the strike "accidental" and an incident of "friendly fire". Dmitry Peskov, the Kremlin's spokesman, said that the pilots had "guided by co-ordinates" given to them by Turkish personnel and that, "there should not have been Turkish troops at those co-ordinates." This charge was denied by Turkish officials.

== Aftermath ==
The Turkish General Staff announced that a Russian war plane targeted Turkish soldiers by accident. After the Russian Government confirmed the action, Russian President Vladimir Putin called Turkish President Recep Tayyip Erdoğan and expressed his regret.

== Reactions ==
- Turkey - Nationalist Movement Party (MHP) head Devlet Bahçeli on February 12 slammed a Russian statement on the "friendly fire" in Syria's al-Bab on February 10 that led to the deaths of three Turkish soldiers, describing it as a shame. “The issue is so important that it cannot be dodged with a condolence message,” said Republican People's Party (CHP) head Kemal Kılıçdaroğlu in a post on Twitter over the developments in Syria.

== See also ==
- 2015 Russian Sukhoi Su-24 shootdown
- 2020 Balyun airstrikes
- Russia–Turkey relations
