= Arima, Syria =

Arima العريمة
- Town
- Location of Arima in Syria
- Coordinates: 36°28′26″N 37°43′09″E
- Country: Syria
- Governorate: Aleppo
- District: al-Bab
- Subdistrict: Arima

Population (2004)
  - Total: 2,839
- Time zone: UTC+2 (EET)
  - Summer (DST): UTC+3 (EEST)

Arima (Arabic: العريمة), also spelled Orayma or Arimah, is a town and seat of a subdistrict (nahiya) in Al-Bab District, located 20 kilometers (12 mi) northeast of the city of al-Bab and 65 kilometers (40 mi) northeast of Aleppo in northern Syria. In the 2004 census, it had a population of 2,839. The town of Qabasin is also to the south-west, and closer than Al-Bab. Manbij city is to the north-east. In course of the Syrian Civil War, the town repeatedly changed hands. As of 2020, it was under dual control of the Syrian government and the Autonomous Administration of North and East Syria (AANES).

== Syrian civil war ==
Arima is the administrative center of Nahiya Arima of the Al-Bab District.

During the Syrian civil war, the village came under the control of, first the rebels in 2012, and then ISIL in 2014. During its Manbij offensive in the summer of 2016, Syrian Democratic Forces (SDF) forces approached the village. In the morning of Monday 20 June 2016, ISIL fighters attacked the Syrian Democratic Forces that had besieged Manbij city, from the Arima village, the Manbij Military Council said. The clashes continued until the afternoon and were repelled by SDF forces. The Al-Shahba documentation centre said ISIL militants arrested 143, mostly Kurdish, civilians in the neighbourhood of the village on 20 June. On 22 June Arima came back in the hands of ISIS, but was retaken by the SDF on 3 October. According to the Syrian Observatory for Human Rights as of November 2016 the town was under the control of Manbij Military Council.

=== Buffer zone ===
Early 2017 saw military clashes in and around Arima between Syrian National Army (SNA) and the Manbij Military Council (MMC). President Tayyip Erdogan of Turkey had declared that Operation Euphrates Shield's target after al-Bab would be to rid Manbij of the mostly Kurdish People's Protection Units.

On March 1, 2017, an agreement between the SDF and the Syrian government, established a buffer zone along the border between the MMC controlled Manbij area and the Turkish buffer zone. The deal brokered by Russia gave control of five villages including Arima to the Syrian government, and by March 4 the Syrian Army had entered the zone. By 13 March Russian troops had also entered the zone. However, the local governing council remained aligned with the al-Bab Military Council, part of the AANES' SDF. The Russian and U.S. American militaries also maintained bases near Arima.

On 25 December 2018, Arima was again placed under Syrian Army control after a deal with the SDF. This was in response to renewed threats of a Turkish-led operation against the SDF in and around Manbij. The SDF also continued to maintain a presence in the village through the al-Bab Military Council, Manbij Military Council, and Kurdish Front. By 2019, the local population suffered from the area's tensions and blockades, as farmers were unable to access their fields in the Turkish-occupied areas. Occasional fighting between the Syrian National Army and the al-Bab Military Council also continued. In March 2020, SOHR reported a rocket attack by the SNA against the Russian base and SDF-aligned factions in Arima. In 2024, the town was targeted as part of a Turkish-backed SNA offensive.
