= Bizaah =

Bizaah بزاعة
- Town
- Location of Bizaah in Syria
- Coordinates: 36°22′51″N 37°33′54″E
- Country: Syria
- Governorate: Aleppo
- District: al-Bab
- Subdistrict: al-Bab

Population (2004)
  - Total: 12,718
- Time zone: UTC+2 (EET)
  - Summer (DST): UTC+3 (EEST)
- Geocode: C1188

B'zaah (Arabic: بزاعة) is a town located 3 km (1.9 mi) east of the city of al-Bab in northern-central Aleppo Governorate, northwestern Syria. It is administratively part of Nahiya al-Bab in al-Bab District. The town is inhabited by Turkmen and had a population of 12,718 as per the 2004 census.

== History ==
During the Roman Empire the town was known as Beselatha, which became Buza'a in the Middle Ages.

=== Medieval era ===
Located on the road to Aleppo, Bizaah was captured by the Crusaders during several attempts to siege the main city. The first was in early 1119, when Roger of Antioch captured it from the Turkoman prince Ilghazi of Mardin. While the second was in 1138, during the Byzantine Emperor John II Komnenos campaign in Syria. It was later captured by the Ayyubid dynasty under the Kurdish ruler Saladin.

=== Syrian Civil War ===
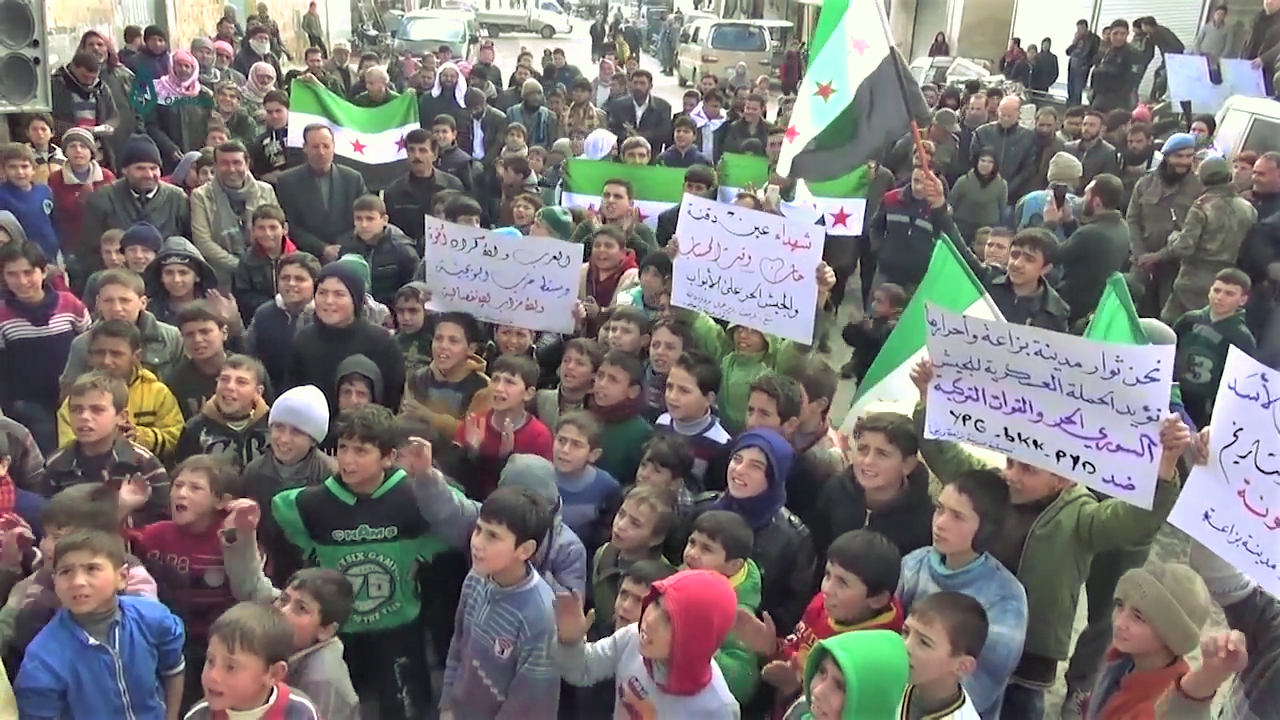
Demonstration in Bizaah in support of the Turkish involvement in the Syrian Civil War.

During the Syrian Civil War in the summer of 2013 Islamic State of Iraq and Syria had a presence in the town and by mid-November 2013, was in full control of the town. On 23 February 2017, the Turkish-backed Free Syrian Army and other affiliated rebels captured the town.

== Notable people ==
- Sayf Bulad, Syrian Turkmen rebel
- Heba Haj Aref, Syrian human rights activist

== Bibliography ==
- Runciman, Steven (1987). A History of the Crusades, Volume 2. CUP Archive. ISBN 9780521347716.
