= Al-Bab District =

al-Bab District منطقة الباب
- District
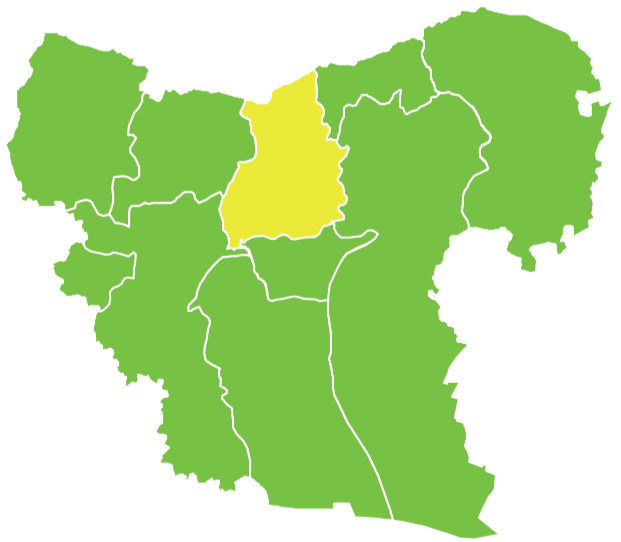
- Location of al-Bab District within Aleppo Governorate

- Location in Syria
- Coordinates (al-Bab): 36.3725°N 37.5178°E
- Country: Syria
- Governorate: Aleppo
- Seat: al-Bab
- Subdistricts: 4 nawāḥī

Area
  - Total: 1,480.19 km^{2} (571.50 sq mi)

Population (2004)
  - Total: 201,589
  - Density: 136.191/km^{2} (352.734/sq mi)
- Geocode: SY0202

al-Bab District (Arabic: منطقة الباب, romanized: manṭiqat al-Bāb) is a district of Aleppo Governorate in northern Syria. The administrative centre is the city of al-Bab.

Subdistricts of al-Bab District

The administrative center of al-Rai Subdistrict shown above is the city of al-Rai.

The administrative center of al-Bab Subdistrict shown above is the city of al-Bab.

The administrative center of Arima Subdistrict shown above is the city of Arima.

The administrative center of Tadef Subdistrict shown above is the city of Tadef.

The district was split in 2009, when three southern subdistricts were separated to form the new Dayr Hafir District. At the 2004 census, the remaining subdistricts had a total population of 201,589.

== Subdistricts ==
The district of al-Bab is divided into four subdistricts or nawāḥī (population as of 2004):

Subdistricts of al-Bab District
| Code | Name | Area | Population | Seat |
|---|---|---|---|---|
| SY020200 | al-Bab Subdistrict | 489.28 km^{2} | 112,219 | al-Bab |
| SY020201 | Tadef Subdistrict | 321.24 km^{2} | 41,951 | Tadef |
| SY020202 | al-Rai Subdistrict | 352.30 km^{2} | 15,378 | al-Rai |
| SY020203 | Arima Subdistrict | 317.38 km^{2} | 32,041 | Arima |
