= Al-Bab =

City in Syria

Al-Bab الْبَاب Bab Biza'ah
- City
- Location of al-Bab in Syria
- Coordinates: 36°22′21″N 37°31′04″E
- Country: Syria
- Governorate: Aleppo
- District: al-Bab
- Subdistrict: al-Bab
- Elevation: 471 m (1,545 ft)

Population (2004)
  - Total: 63,069
- Time zone: UTC+3 (AST)

Al-Bab (Arabic: الْبَاب / ALA-LC: al-Bāb) is a Syrian city, administratively belonging to the Aleppo Governorate. Al-Bab is located 40 kilometres (25 mi) northeast of Aleppo, 30 kilometres (19 mi) south of the Turkish border, and has an area of 30 square kilometres (12 square miles). Al-Bab has an altitude of 471 metres (1,545 feet). According to the Central Bureau of Statistics (CBS), it had a population of 63,069 in 2004. The population has surged to about 100,000 during the Syrian Civil War.

Prior to the Syrian Civil War, al-Bab's inhabitants were composed of a Sunni Arab majority, and a Kurdish minority outside the city center.

Al-Bab is the administrative center of the Nahiya al-Bab and Al-Bab District.

As of February 2025, the city was under the control of the Syrian National Army, as part of the Syrian Interim Government. The Turkish Armed Forces currently maintain a presence in the city.

== Name ==
Al-Bāb in Arabic means the door. According to Arab geographer Yaqut al-Hamawi in 1226, the name is a shortening of Bāb Bizāʻah (the gate to Bizāʻah). Bizāʻah (also Buzāʻah and Bzāʻā) is a town located about 10 kilometres (6.2 miles) east of Al-Bāb.

== History ==
During the Roman Empire, Al-Bab was a civitas of the Roman Province of Syria, known as Batnai. The ruins of that settlement lie on the banks of the wadi 1 kilometre (0.62 mi) north of the modern town. Roman Batnai should not be confused with the Roman town Batnae about 70 kilometres (43 mi) northeast.

Al-Bab was conquered by the Arab army of the Rashidun Caliphate under caliph Umar ibn al-Khattab in the 7th century. It received its name, meaning "the Gate", during Islamic rule as it served as "the gate" between Aleppo and the adjacent town of Buza'ah.

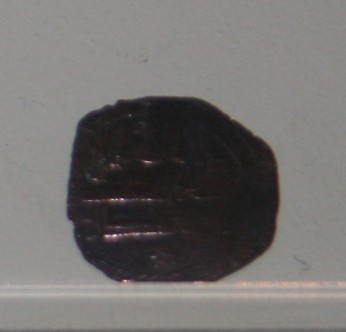
Abbasid fals (Copper coin) minted in Al-Bab

Until its rule by the Ayyubids in the 13th century, the town was populated mostly by Shias of the Ismaili sect.

According to Yaqut al-Hamawi in 1226, it was a small town in the district of Aleppo. In the town were markets filled with cotton products called kirbas which were exported to Damascus and Egypt. The fourteenth-century historian Abu'l-Fida writes that al-Bab was a small town with a market, a bath, pleasant gardens, and a mosque (the Great Mosque of al-Bab).

The fortunes of Al-Bab were shared with that of Aleppo when that city was conquered by the Ottoman Empire in 1516, and was administered as part of the Eyalet of Aleppo until 1866 and the Vilayet of Aleppo until January 1919, when the district was occupied by French troops and attached to the State of Aleppo within the French mandate of Syria.

=== Syrian Civil War ===
Until April 2012, Al-Bab had been relatively unscathed by the Syrian civil war. Between mid-May and mid-July, some 15 opposition rebel groups formed within the city. The fight for Al-Bab included a series of raids and assaults on government offices over the course of two months, finally culminating on 18 July when FSA rebels seized the final government stronghold within the city limits. According to opposition activists, an army garrison remained outside al-Bab and shelled the rebels' positions. Rebel forces pushed the army from this garrison on the south edge of town on 29 July, With the seizure of al-Bab, the rebels in the northern Aleppo countryside gained considerable momentum. The city's capture gave the rebels full control of the areas northeast of Aleppo city. However, in the summer of 2013 Islamic State of Iraq and the Levant had a presence in the town and by mid November, 2013, was in full control of Al-Bab.

In January 2014, ISIS solidified their control over the town following an outbreak of major conflict between them and other opposition forces. After the capture of Manbij by the Syrian Democratic Forces in August 2016, al-Bab was reported to be the next objective of the Syrian Democratic Forces (SDF) campaign. In December 2016, al-Bab came under an attack by Syrian rebels backed by Turkey. Turkish air strikes on 21 December destroyed 67 Islamic State targets; 59 Turkish soldiers and over 200 rebels were reported killed. Al-Bab was a strategically important town for Turkey because it did not want the two SDF regions to link up. On 9 February 2017, a Russian air strike killed three Turkish soldiers by mistake. On 23 February 2017, al-Bab was captured by Turkish-backed rebels, becoming a part of the Turkish buffer zone.

On 15 July 2020, unknown aircraft, suspected to be Russian, carried out airstrikes on the city of al-Bab. An apartment complex was destroyed in the attack. One civilian was killed and at least 10 others were injured in the airstrikes. It was the first airstrike on the town since it was captured from the Islamic State.

== Security ==
In February 2017, a Turkish trained police force of 2000 men was deployed in al-Bab.

== Education ==
in 2019 it was announced that the University of Gaziantep is opening a Faculty of Economics and administrative Sciences in al-Bab.

== Climate ==
Al-Bab has a cold semi-arid climate (Köppen climate classification BSk) with influences of a continental climate during winter with hot dry summers and cool wet and occasionally snowy winters. The average high temperature in January is 8.3 °C (47 °F) and the average high temperature in July is 36.2 °C (97 °F). The snow usually falls in December or January.

Climate data for Al Bab
Month	Jan	Feb	Mar	Apr	May	Jun	Jul	Aug	Sep	Oct	Nov	Dec	Year
Record high °C (°F)	17 (63)	21 (70)	31 (88)	34 (93)	41 (106)	47 (117)	46 (115)	43 (109)	41 (106)	37 (99)	30 (86)	18 (64)	47 (117)
Mean daily maximum °C (°F)	8.3 (46.9)	9.6 (49.3)	14.7 (58.5)	19.6 (67.3)	25.7 (78.3)	31.6 (88.9)	36.2 (97.2)	36.1 (97.0)	31.2 (88.2)	24.0 (75.2)	16.8 (62.2)	10.1 (50.2)	23.8 (74.9)
Mean daily minimum °C (°F)	−1.1 (30.0)	0.1 (32.2)	3.0 (37.4)	7.6 (45.7)	13.5 (56.3)	17.1 (62.8)	20.9 (69.6)	20.9 (69.6)	17.3 (63.1)	11.4 (52.5)	3.4 (38.1)	1.3 (34.3)	10.9 (51.6)
Record low °C (°F)	−13 (9)	−10 (14)	−7 (19)	−2 (28)	0 (32)	9 (48)	16 (61)	15 (59)	7 (45)	5 (41)	−3 (27)	−8 (18)	−13 (9)
Average precipitation mm (inches)	60.3 (2.37)	52.0 (2.05)	46.1 (1.81)	33.6 (1.32)	17.9 (0.70)	2.3 (0.09)	0.1 (0.00)	0.3 (0.01)	2.2 (0.09)	19.2 (0.76)	35.2 (1.39)	59.6 (2.35)	328.8 (12.94)
Average precipitation days (≥ 0.1 mm)	13	14	10	7	4	1	0	0	1	4	7	11	72
Average rainy days	12.3	12.3	12.1	10.6	6.8	2.0	0	0	1.5	6.5	8.7	11.9	84.7
Average snowy days	3.5	0.8	0.3	0	0	0	0	0	0	0	0.1	1.2	5.9
Average relative humidity (%)	72	68	63	61	54	45	37	38	45	56	68	71	57
Mean monthly sunshine hours	120.9	140.0	198.4	243.0	319.3	366.0	387.5	365.8	303.0	244.9	186.0	127.1	3,001.9
Source 1: World Meteorological Organization, Hong Kong Observatory (sun 1961–1990)
Source 2: BBC Weather (record highs and lows)
