= Syria (region) =

Region east of the Mediterranean Sea

Syria ٱلشَّام Ash-Shām Greater Syria
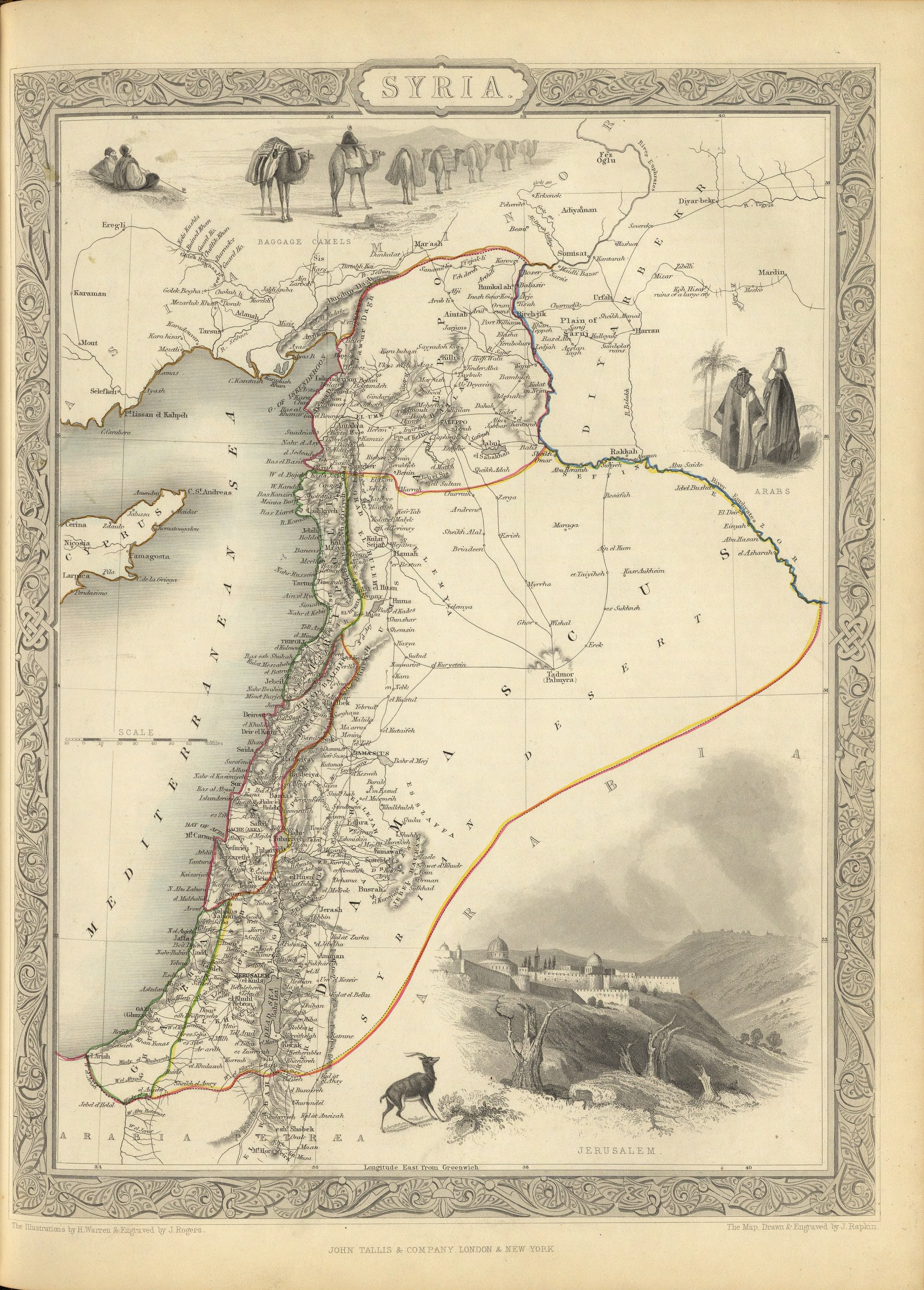
- Map of Ottoman Syria in 1851, by Henry Warren
- Coordinates: 33°N 36°E
- Countries: Jordan; Lebanon; Palestine; Israel; Syria; Turkey (Hatay Province and Southeastern Anatolia)

Syria (Arabic: ٱلشَّام, romanized: Ash-Shām or Shām), also known as Greater Syria (Arabic: سُورِيَا الكبرى, romanized: Sūriya al-Kubra) or Syria-Palestine, is a historical region located east of the Mediterranean Sea in West Asia, broadly synonymous with the Levant. Historically, the term "Syria" referred to the area between the Taurus Mountains in the north, Sinai in the south-west, and Arabia in the south-east; however, in modern times it is used to refer solely to the Syrian Arab Republic.

The term is originally derived from Assyria, an ancient Semitic-speaking civilization centered in northern Mesopotamia, modern-day Iraq. During the Hellenistic period, the term Syria was applied to the entire Levant as Coele-Syria. Under Roman rule, the term was used to refer to the province of Syria, later divided into Syria Phoenicia and Coele Syria, and to the province of Syria Palaestina. Under the Byzantines, the provinces of Syria Prima and Syria Secunda emerged out of Coele Syria. After the Muslim conquest of Syria, the term was superseded by the Arabic equivalent Shām, and under the Rashidun, Umayyad, Abbasid, and Fatimid caliphates, Bilad al-Sham was the name of the metropolitan province encompassing most of the region. In the 19th century, the name Syria was revived in its modern Arabic form to denote the whole of Bilad al-Sham, either as Suriyah or the modern form Suriyya, which eventually replaced the Arabic name of Bilad al-Sham.

After World War I, the boundaries of the region were last defined in modern times by the proclamation of and subsequent definition by French and British mandatory agreement, as laid out in the Sykes–Picot Agreement. Following the Arab Revolt and Franco-Syrian War, the area was divided and passed to French and British League of Nations mandates. Subsequently, five states — Greater Lebanon, the State of Damascus, the State of Aleppo, the State of Alawites, and the State of Jabal Druze — were established by the French, while the British controlled Mandatory Palestine and the Emirate of Transjordan. The term Syria itself was applied to several mandate states under French rule and the contemporaneous but short-lived Arab Kingdom of Syria. The Syrian-mandate states were gradually unified as the State of Syria and finally became the independent Syrian Republic in 1946. Throughout this period, pan-Syrian nationalists advocated for the creation of a Greater Syria, sometimes as a step toward achieving a broader pan-Arab state.

== Etymology and evolution of the term ==
Several sources indicate that the name Syria itself is derived from Luwian term "Sura/i", and the derivative ancient Greek name: Σύριοι, Sýrioi, or Σύροι, Sýroi, both of which originally derived from Aššūrāyu (Assyria) in northern Mesopotamia, modern-day Iraq and greater Syria For Herodotus in the 5th century BC, Syria extended as far north as the Halys (the modern Kızılırmak River) and as far south as Arabia and Egypt. For Pliny the Elder and Pomponius Mela, Syria covered the entire Fertile Crescent.

In Late Antiquity, "Syria" meant a region located to the east of the Mediterranean Sea, west of the Euphrates River, north of the Arabian Desert and south of the Taurus Mountains, thereby including modern Syria, Lebanon, Jordan, Israel, Palestine, and parts of Southern Turkey, namely the Hatay Province and the western half of the Southeastern Anatolia Region. This late definition is equivalent to the region known in Classical Arabic by the name ash-Shām (Arabic: ٱَلشَّام /ʔaʃ-ʃaːm/, which means the north [country] (from the root šʔm Arabic: شَأْم "left, north")). After the Arab conquest of Byzantine Syria in the 7th century CE, the name Syria fell out of primary use in the region itself, being superseded by the Arabic equivalent Shām, but survived in its original sense in Byzantine and Western European usage, and in Syriac Christian literature. In the 19th century, the name Syria was revived in its modern Arabic form to denote the whole of Bilad al-Sham, either as Suriyah or the modern form Suriyya, which eventually replaced the Arabic name of Bilad al-Sham. After World War I, the name Syria was applied to the French Mandate for Syria and the Lebanon and the contemporaneous but short-lived Arab Kingdom of Syria.

== Geography ==
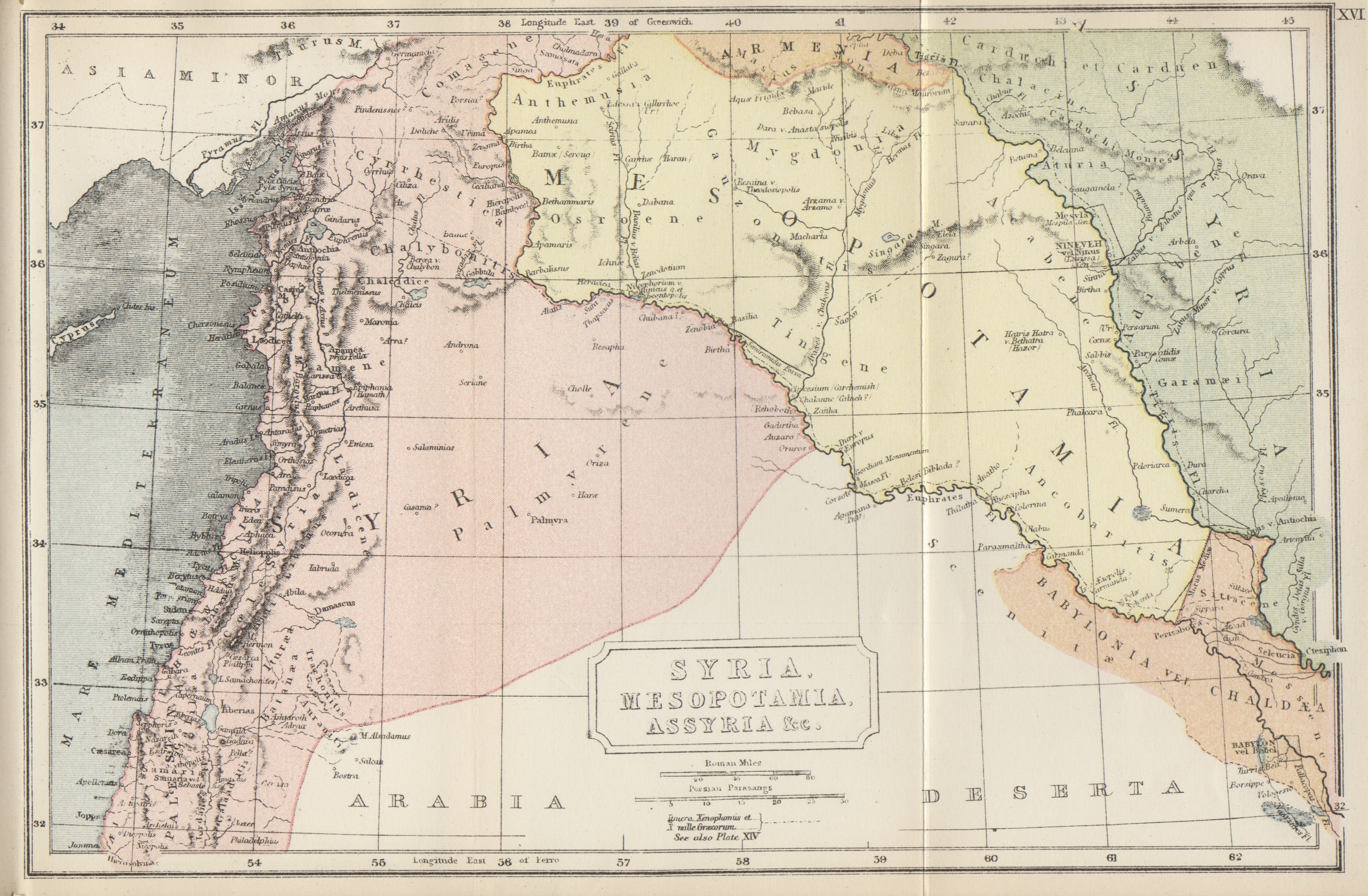
Map depicting Syria as the land ranging from the Taurus Mountains to the Sinai Peninsula to the Euphrates, but not including Upper Mesopotamia

In the most common historical sense, 'Syria' refers to the entire northern Levant, including Alexandretta and the Ancient City of Antioch or in an extended sense the entire Levant as far south as Roman Egypt, including Mesopotamia. The area of "Greater Syria" (Arabic: سُوْرِيَّة ٱلْكُبْرَىٰ, Sūrīyah al-Kubrā); also called "Natural Syria" (Arabic: سُوْرِيَّة ٱلطَّبِيْعِيَّة, Sūrīyah aṭ-Ṭabīʿīyah) or "Northern Land" (Arabic: بِلَاد ٱلشَّام, Bilād ash-Shām), extends roughly over the Bilad al-Sham province of the medieval Arab caliphates, encompassing the Eastern Mediterranean (or Levant) and Western Mesopotamia. The term “Natural Syria” has historically been used to describe a geographic concept of the region that predates modern political borders. It defines the region as a natural whole. However, the boundaries of Bilad al-Sham/Greater Syria were not consistently defined across historical periods and often shifted depending on administrative, geographic, or cultural usage. In the 20th century, this idea also entered cultural and political discourse to preserve regional unity conceptually and frame the newly imposed divisions of the French and British mandates as unnatural and artificial.

The Muslim conquest of the Levant in the seventh century gave rise to this province, which encompassed much of the region of Syria, and came to largely overlap with this concept. Although it was at times organized as a province under larger empires, Bilad al-Sham was only intermittently administered as a single unified territorial unit. Other sources indicate that the term Greater Syria was coined during Ottoman rule, after 1516, to designate the approximate area included in present-day Israel, Palestine, Syria, Jordan, Lebanon.

The uncertainty in the definition of the extent of "Syria" is aggravated by the etymological confusion of the similar-sounding names Syria and Assyria. The question of the etymological identity of the two names remains open today. Regardless of etymology, both were thought of as interchangeable around the time of Herodotus. However, by the time of the Roman Empire, 'Syria' and 'Assyria' began to refer to two separate entities, Roman Syria and Roman Assyria.

Killebrew and Steiner, treating the Levant as the Syrian region, gave the boundaries of the region as such: the Mediterranean Sea to the west, the Arabian Desert to the south, Mesopotamia to the east, and the Taurus Mountains of Anatolia to the north. The Muslim geographer Muhammad al-Idrisi visited the region in 1150 and assigned the northern regions of Bilad al-Sham as the following:

In the Levantine sea are two islands: Rhodes and Cyprus; and in Levantine lands: Antarsus, Laodice, Antioch, Mopsuhestia, Adana, Anazarbus, Tarsus, Circesium, Ḥamrtash, Antalya, al-Batira, al-Mira, Macri, Astroboli; and in the interior lands: Apamea, Salamiya, Qinnasrin, al-Castel, Aleppo, Resafa, Raqqa, Rafeqa, al-Jisr, Manbij, Mar'ash, Saruj, Ḥarran, Edessa, Al-Ḥadath, Samosata, Malatiya, Ḥusn Mansur, Zabatra, Jersoon, al-Leen, al-Bedandour, Cirra and Touleb.

For Pliny the Elder and Pomponius Mela, Syria covered the entire Fertile Crescent. In Late Antiquity, "Syria" meant a region located to the east of the Mediterranean Sea, west of the Euphrates River, north of the Arabian Desert, and south of the Taurus Mountains, thereby including modern Syria, Lebanon, Jordan, Israel, the State of Palestine, and the Hatay Province and the western half of the Southeastern Anatolia Region of southern Turkey. This late definition is equivalent to the region known in Classical Arabic by the name ash-Shām (ٱلشَّام /ʔaʃ-ʃaːm/), which means the north [country] (from the root šʔm شَأْم "left, north"). After the Islamic conquest of Byzantine Syria in the seventh century, the name Syria fell out of primary use in the region itself, being superseded by the Arabic equivalent Bilād ash-Shām ("Northern Land'"), but survived in its original sense in Byzantine and Western European usage, and in Syriac Christian literature. In the 19th century, the name Syria was revived in its modern Arabic form to denote the whole of Bilad al-Sham, either as Suriyah or the modern form Suriyya, which eventually replaced the Arabic name of Bilad al-Sham. After World War I, the name 'Syria' was applied to the French Mandate for Syria and the Lebanon, and the contemporaneous but short-lived Arab Kingdom of Syria. Historically, no single city maintained long-term dominance over the entire region, and Bilad al-Sham developed as a decentralized network of multiple urban centers rather than around one permanent political or economic capital.

The region has multiple rivers, including the Yarmuk, Khabur, Queiq, Daysan, Balikh, Jordan, Orontes, Litani, and Barada. As well as multiple bodies of water, including the Sea of Galilee, Lake Assad, Lake Qattinah, Dead Sea, Lake Homs, Sabkhat al-Jabbul, Sabkhat al-Mouh, and Sabkhat al-Mouhajjarah. Mountain chains include the Lebanon, Taurus, anti-Lebanon, Nusayri, Carmel, Nur, and Jordanian highlands.

Today, the largest metropolitan areas in the region are Amman, Tel Aviv, Damascus, Beirut, Aleppo and Gaza City.

Rank	City	Country	Metropolitan Population	City Population	Image
1	Amman	Jordan	4,642,000	4,061,150	
2	Tel Aviv	Israel	3,954,500	438,818	
3	Damascus	Syria	2,900,000	2,078,000	
4	Beirut	Lebanon	2,200,000	361,366	
5	Aleppo	Syria	2,098,210	2,098,210	
6	Gaza City	Palestine	2,047,969	590,481	

== Etymology ==
=== Syria ===
Several sources indicate that the name Syria itself is derived from Luwian term "Sura/i", and the derivative ancient Greek name: Σύριοι, Sýrioi, or Σύροι, Sýroi, both of which originally derived from Aššūrāyu (Assyria) in northern Mesopotamia, modern-day Iraq However, during the Seleucid Empire, this term was also applied to The Levant, and henceforth the Greeks applied the term without distinction between the Assyrians of Mesopotamia and Arameans of the Levant.

The oldest attestation of the name 'Syria' is from the 8th century BC in a bilingual inscription in Hieroglyphic Luwian and Phoenician. In this inscription, the Luwian word Sura/i was translated to Phoenician ʔšr "Assyria." For Herodotus in the 5th century BC, Syria extended as far north as the Halys (the modern Kızılırmak River) and as far south as Arabia and Egypt.

The name 'Syria' derives from the ancient Greek name for Assyrians, Greek: Σύριοι Syrioi, which the Greeks applied without distinction to various Near Eastern peoples living under the rule of Assyria. Modern scholarship confirms the Greek word traces back to the cognate Greek: Ἀσσυρία, Assyria.

The classical Arabic pronunciation of Syria is Sūriya (as opposed to the Modern Standard Arabic pronunciation Sūrya). That name was not widely used among Muslims before about 1870, but it had been used by Christians earlier. According to the Syriac Orthodox Church, "Syrian" meant "Christian" in early Christianity. In English, "Syrian" historically meant a Syrian Christian such as Ephrem the Syrian. Following the declaration of Syria in 1936, the term "Syrian" came to designate citizens of that state, regardless of ethnicity. The adjective "Syriac" (suryāni سُرْيَانِي) has come into common use since as an ethnonym to avoid the ambiguity of "Syrian".

Currently, the Arabic term Sūriya usually refers to the modern state of Syria, as opposed to the historical region of Syria.

Before 1918, the term 'Syria' described the geographical region of Bilad Ash-Shām. With the introduction of the Mandate System and the emergence of the modern state Syria, the term 'Greater Syria' emerged to distinguish between Bilad Ash-Shām and Syria.

=== Shaam ===
Greater Syria has been widely known as Ash-Shām. The term etymologically in Arabic means "the left-hand side" or "the north", as someone in the Hejaz facing east, oriented to the sunrise, will find the north to the left. This is contrasted with the name of Yemen (اَلْيَمَن al-Yaman), correspondingly meaning "the right-hand side" or "the south". The variation ش ء م (š-ʾ-m), of the more typical ش م ل (š-m-l), is also attested in Old South Arabian, 𐩦𐩱𐩣 (s²ʾm), with the same semantic development.

The root of Shaam, ش ء م (š-ʾ-m) also has connotations of unluckiness, which is traditionally associated with the left-hand and with the colder north-winds. Again this is in contrast with Yemen, with felicity and success, and the positively-viewed warm-moist southerly wind; a theory for the etymology of Arabia Felix denoting Yemen, by translation of that sense.

The Shaam region is sometimes defined as the area dominated by Damascus, long an important regional center. Ash-Sām on its own can refer to the city of Damascus. Continuing with the similar contrasting theme, Damascus was the commercial destination and representative of the region in the same way Sanaa held for the south.

== Demographics ==
Historical population of the region of Syria
Year	Pop.	±%
14	4,300,000	—
164	4,800,000	+11.6%
500	4,127,000	−14.0%
900	3,120,000	−24.4%
1200	2,700,000	−13.5%
1500	1,500,000	−44.4%
1700	2,028,000	+35.2%
1897	3,231,874	+59.4%
1914	3,448,356	+6.7%
1922	3,198,951	−7.2%

In Greater Syria a variety of ethnic and religious groups coexist throughout history, influenced by the regions geographical conditions. The largest religious group in the Levant are Muslims and the largest ethnic group are Arabs. Levantines predominantly speak Levantine Arabic, who derive their ancestry from the many ancient Semitic-speaking peoples who inhabited the ancient Near East during the Bronze and Iron Ages. Others such as Bedouin Arabs inhabit the Syrian Desert and Naqab, and speak a dialect known as Bedouin Arabic that originated in Arabian Peninsula. Other minor ethnic groups in the Levant include Circassians, Chechens, Turks, Turkmens, Assyrians, Kurds, Nawars and Armenians.

Islam became the predominant religion in the region after the Muslim conquest of the Levant in the 7th century. The majority of Levantine Muslims are Sunni with Alawite and Shia (Twelver and Nizari Ismaili) minorities. Alawites and Ismaili Shiites mainly inhabit Hatay and the Syrian Coastal Mountain Range, while Twelver Shiites are mainly concentrated in parts of Lebanon.

Levantine Christian groups are plenty and include Greek Orthodox (Antiochian Greek), Syriac Orthodox, Eastern Catholic (Syriac Catholic, Melkite and Maronite), Roman Catholic (Latin), Nestorian, and Protestant. Armenians mostly belong to the Armenian Apostolic Church. There are also Levantines or Franco-Levantines who adhere to Roman Catholicism. There are also Assyrians belonging to the Assyrian Church of the East and the Chaldean Catholic Church.

Other religious groups in the Levant include Jews, Samaritans, Yazidis and Druze.

== History ==
=== Ancient Syria ===
Herodotus uses Ancient Greek: Συρία to refer to the stretch of land from the Halys river, including Cappadocia (The Histories, I.6) in today's Turkey to the Mount Casius (The Histories II.158), which Herodotus says is located just south of Lake Serbonis (The Histories III.5). According to Herodotus various remarks in different locations, he describes Syria to include the entire stretch of Phoenician coastal line as well as cities such Cadytis (Jerusalem) (The Histories III.159).

=== Hellenistic Syria ===
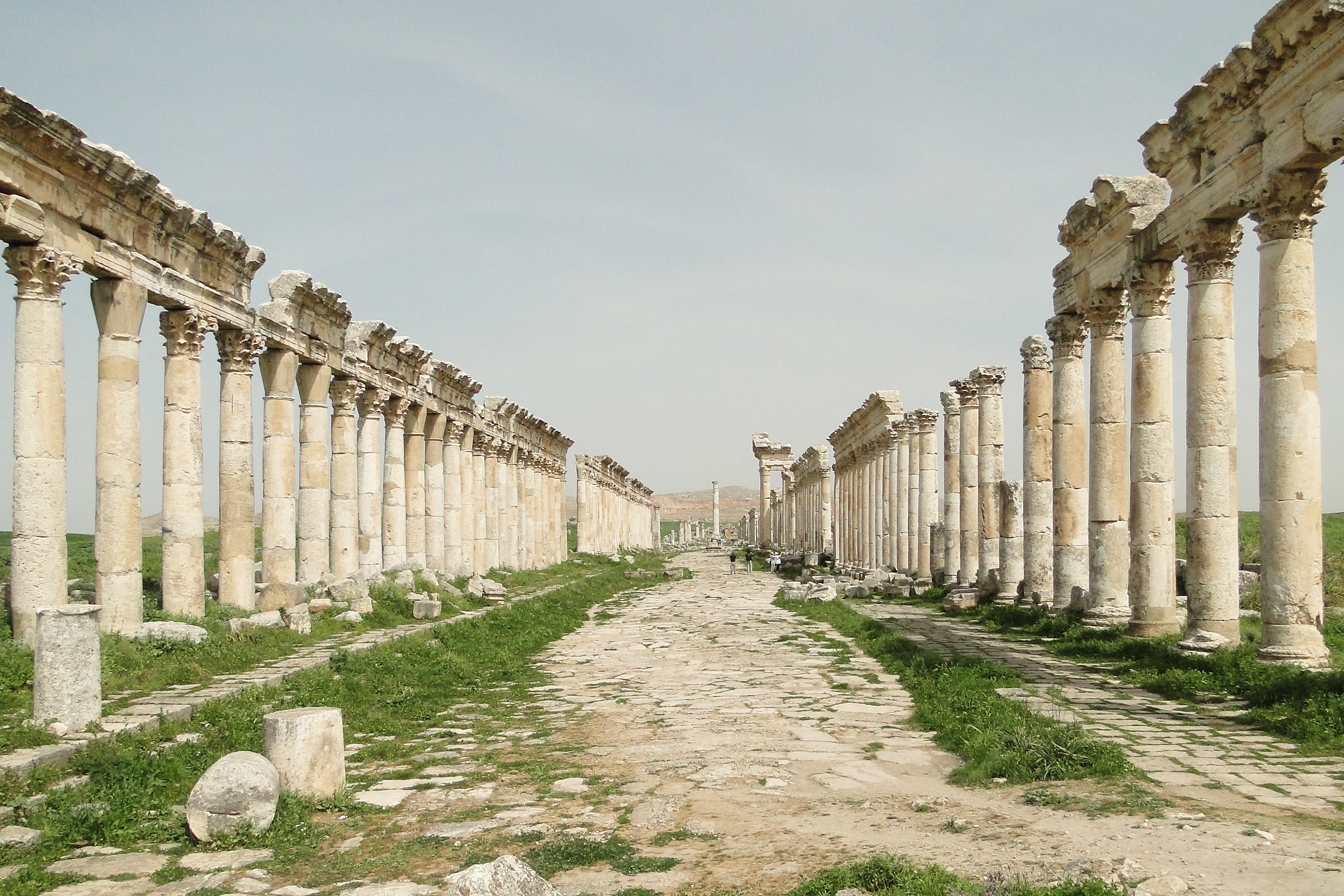
The ancient city of Apamea, Syria was an important trading center, and a prosperous city in Hellenistic and Roman times

In Greek usage, Syria and Assyria were used almost interchangeably, but in the Roman Empire, Syria and Assyria came to be used as distinct geographical terms. "Syria" in the Roman Empire period referred to "those parts of the Empire situated between Asia Minor and Egypt", i.e. the western Levant, while "Assyria" was part of the Persian Empire, and only very briefly came under Roman control (116–118 AD, marking the historical peak of Roman expansion).

=== Roman Syria ===
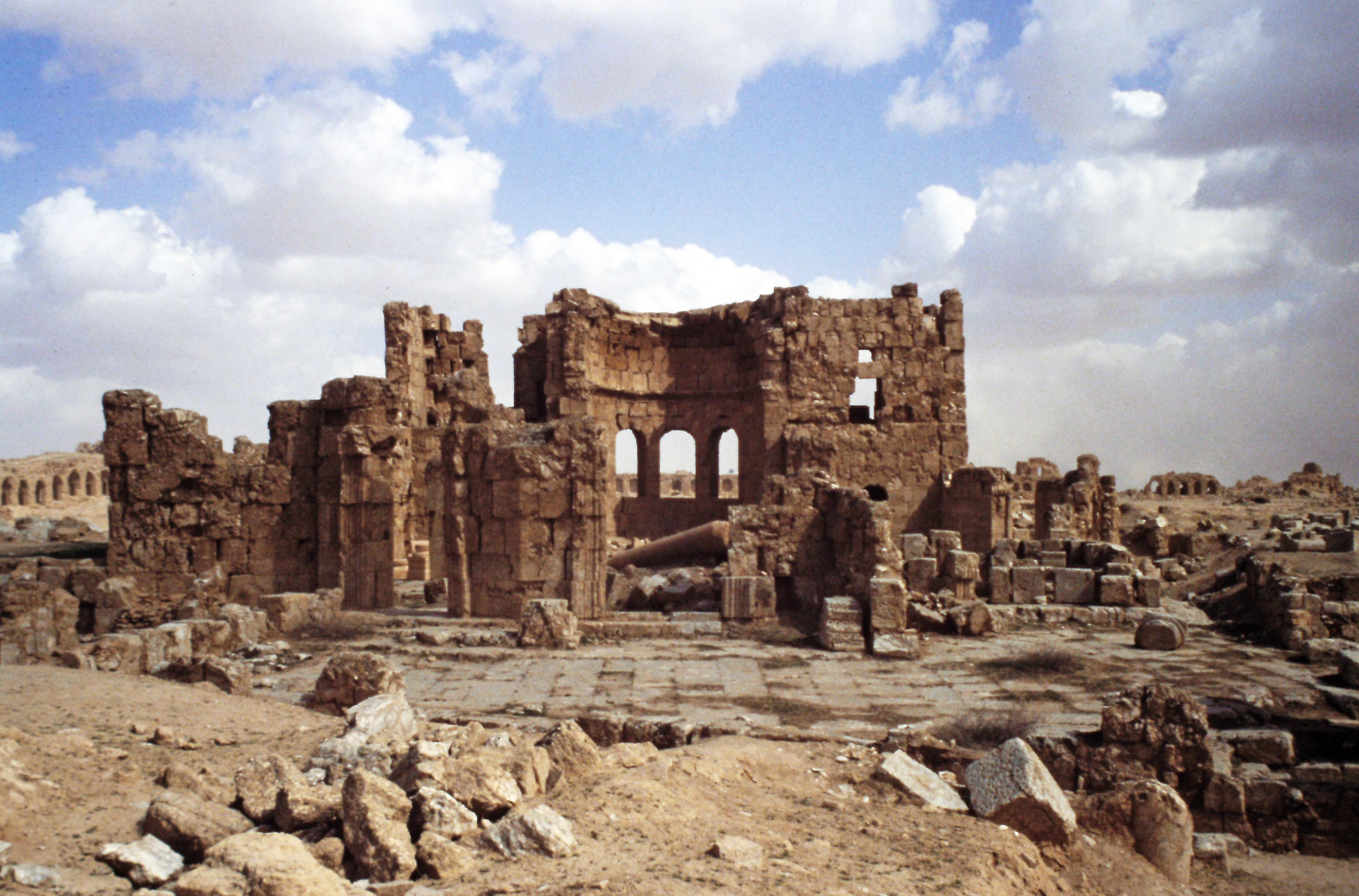
Ruins at Sergiopolis

In the Roman era, the term Syria is used to comprise the entire northern Levant and has an uncertain border to the northeast that Pliny the Elder describes as including, from west to east, the Kingdom of Commagene, Sophene, and Adiabene, "formerly known as Assyria".

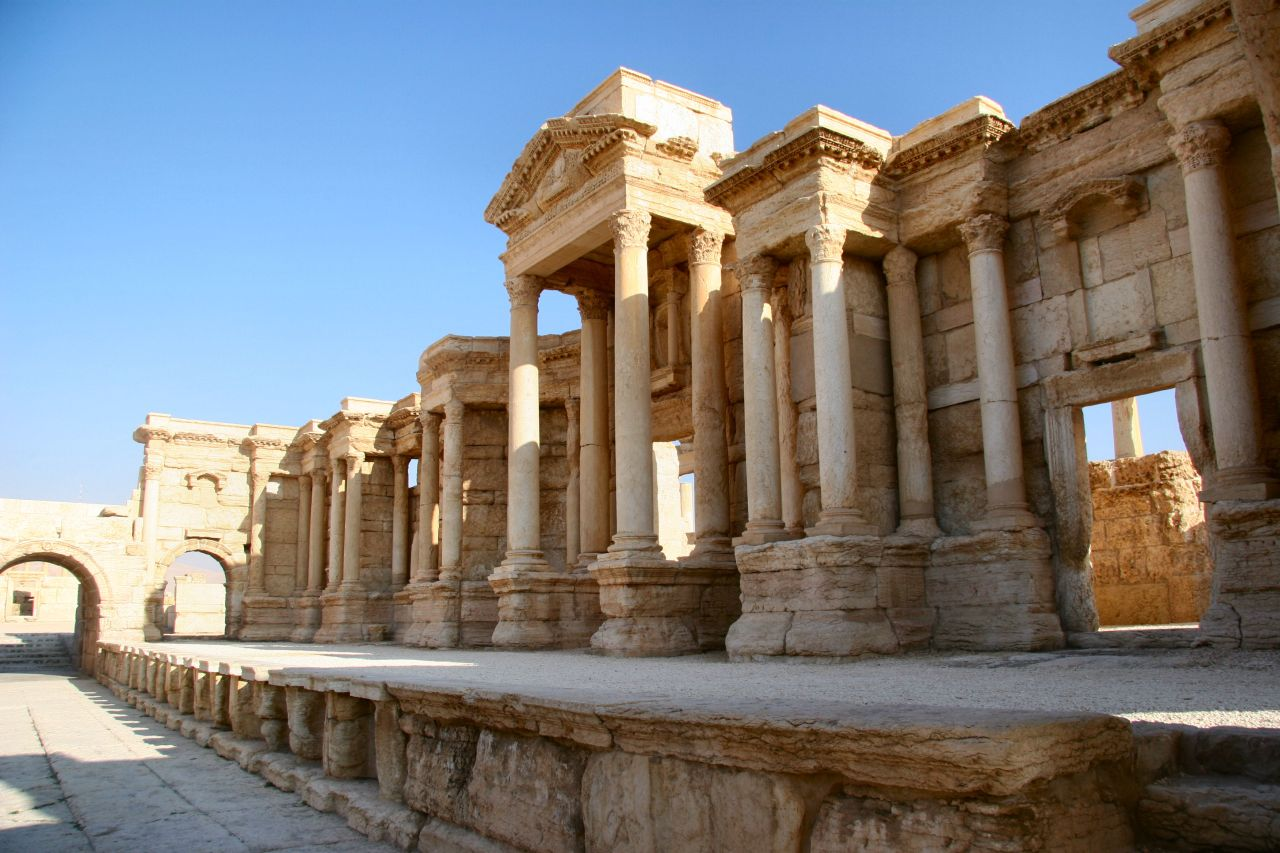
Palmyra, one of ancient Syria's wealthiest cities

Various writers used the term to describe the entire Levant region during this period; the New Testament used the name in this sense on numerous occasions.

In 64 BC, Syria became a province of the Roman Empire, following the conquest by Pompey. Roman Syria bordered Judea to the south, Anatolian Greek domains to the north, Phoenicia to the West, and was in constant struggle with Parthians to the East. In 135 AD, Syria-Palaestina became to incorporate the entire Levant and Western Mesopotamia. In 193, the province was divided into Syria proper (Coele-Syria) and Phoenice. Sometime between 330 and 350 (likely c. 341), the province of Euphratensis was created out of the territory of Syria Coele and the former realm of Commagene, with Hierapolis as its capital.

After c. 415 Syria Coele was further subdivided into Syria I, with the capital remaining at Antioch, and Syria II or Salutaris, with capital at Apamea on the Orontes River. In 528, Justinian I carved out the small coastal province Theodorias out of territory from both provinces.

=== Bilad al-Sham ===
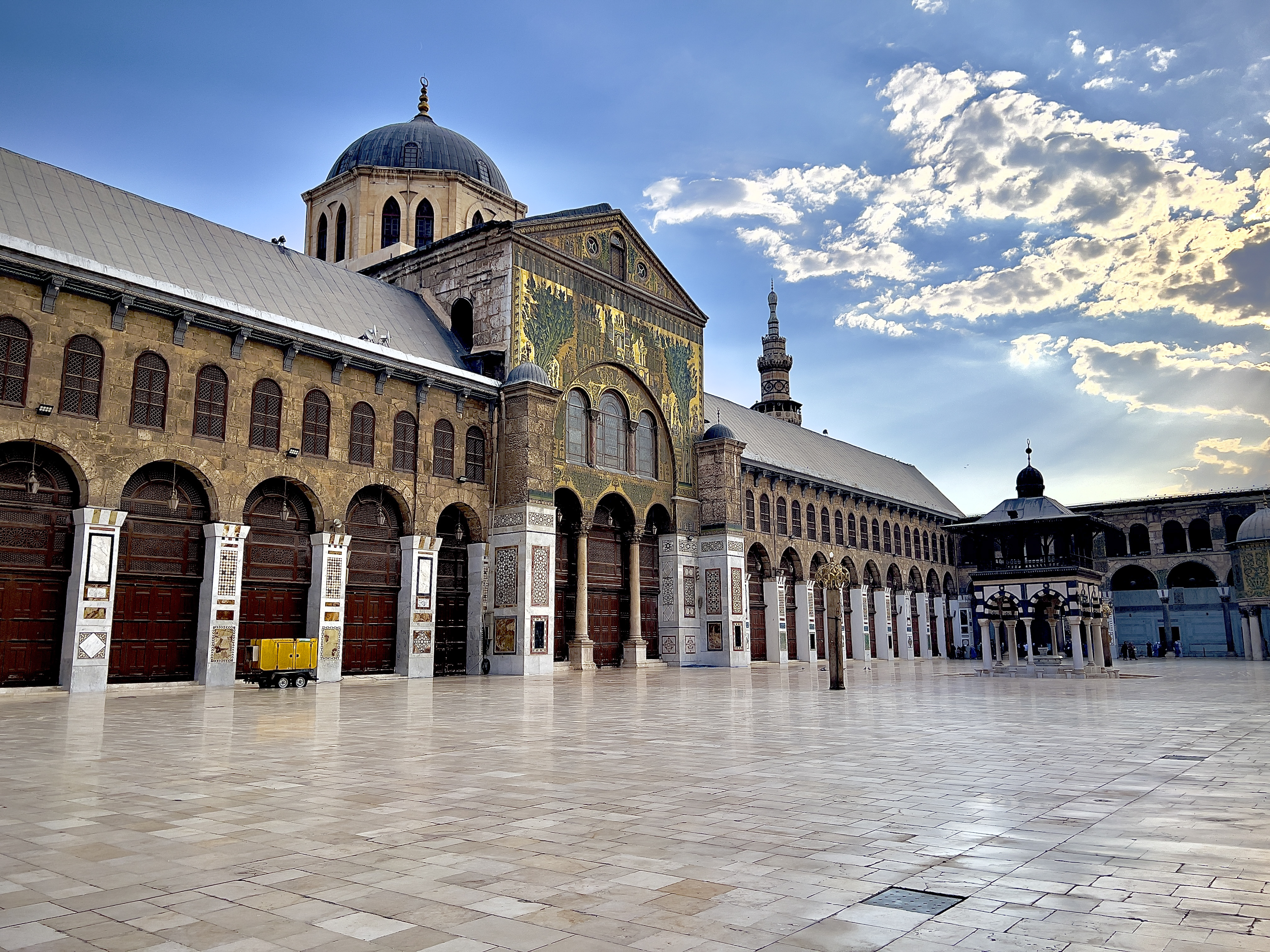
The Umayyad Mosque in Damascus, built in 715, is one of the oldest, largest and best preserved mosques in the world.

Between 634–638, the region was annexed to the Rashidun Caliphate after the Muslim victory over the Byzantine Empire at the Battle of Yarmouk, and became known as the province of Bilad al-Sham. During the Umayyad Caliphate, the Shām was divided into five junds or military districts. They were Jund Dimashq (for the area of Damascus), Jund Ḥimṣ (for the area of Homs), Jund Filasṭīn for the area around Tiberias (a city in northern Palestine) and Jund al-Urdunn for the area around Ramla (a newly-established city in southern Palestine). Later Jund Qinnasrîn was created out of part of Jund Hims. The city of Damascus was the capital of the Umayyad Caliphate, until the rise of the Abbasid Caliphate. This period was considered a rapid re-Semitization period and usage of Arabic language after a long period of Hellenization and the usage of Greek language.

=== Ottoman Syria ===
In 1516 the region was conquered by the Ottoman empire, in the later ages of the Ottoman times, it was divided into wilayahs or sub-provinces the borders of which and the choice of cities as seats of government within them varied over time. The vilayets or sub-provinces of Aleppo, Damascus, and Beirut, in addition to the two special districts of Mount Lebanon and Jerusalem. Aleppo consisted of northern modern-day Syria plus parts of southern Turkey, Damascus covered southern Syria and modern-day Jordan, Beirut covered Lebanon and the Syrian coast from the port-city of Latakia southward to the Galilee, while Jerusalem consisted of the land south of the Galilee and west of the Jordan River and the Wadi Arabah.

Although the region's population was dominated by Sunni Muslims, it also contained sizable populations of Shi'ite, Alawite and Ismaili Muslims, Syriac Orthodox, Maronite, Greek Orthodox, Roman Catholics and Melkite Christians, Jews and Druze.

Major urban centers such as Damascus, Aleppo, and Beirut continued to serve as regional hubs after the end of Ottoman rule. These cities maintained economic and social ties with each other and with surrounding hinterlands. This illustrates how older networks persisted alongside the emergence of new political borders under the French and British mandates. Moreover, cities were not simply absorbed into nation-states. Rather, they functioned as enduring nodes of regional integration and helped define regional order.

=== Arab Kingdom and French occupation ===
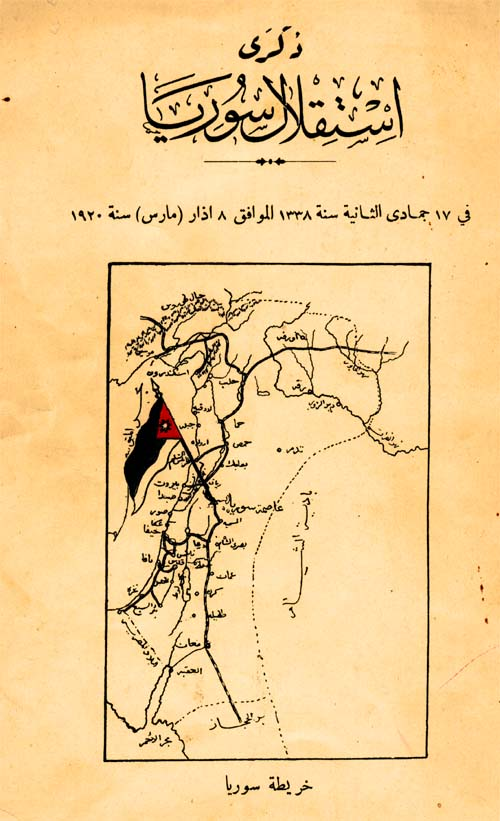
Book of the Independence of Syria (Arabic: ذِكْرَى اِسْتِقْلَال سُوْرِيَا, romanized: Dhikrā Istiqlāl Sūriyā), showing the declared borders of the Kingdom of Syria, states the date of the Declaration of Independence on 8 March 1920

The Occupied Enemy Territory Administration (OETA) was a British, French and Arab military administration over areas of the former Ottoman Empire between 1917 and 1920, during and following World War I. The wave of Arab nationalism evolved towards the creation of the first modern Arab state to come into existence, the Hashemite Arab Kingdom of Syria on 8 March 1920. The kingdom claimed the entire region of Syria whilst exercising control over only the inland region known as OETA East. This led to the acceleration of the declaration of the French Mandate for Syria and the Lebanon and British Mandate for Palestine at the 19–26 April 1920 San Remo conference, and subsequently the Franco-Syrian War, in July 1920, in which French armies defeated the newly proclaimed kingdom and captured Damascus, aborting the Arab state.

Thereafter, the French general Henri Gouraud, in breach of the conditions of the mandate, subdivided the French Mandate of Syria into six states. They were the states of Damascus (1920), Aleppo (1920), Alawite State (1920), Jabal Druze (1921), the autonomous Sanjak of Alexandretta (1921) (modern-day Hatay in Turkey), and Greater Lebanon (1920) which later became the modern country of Lebanon.

Despite the political partition of the region under French and British mandates after World War I, economic, social, and infrastructural connections across former Greater Syria persisted throughout the 1920s. Trade networks, road and rail links, and patterns of migration and commercial exchange continued to span the new borders, which reflects the deep interdependence between the territories. Politically, besides the increasing importance of Zionism, the region saw growing nationalist movements. These occurred within the new countries as well as on a regional scale.

=== In pan-Syrian nationalism ===
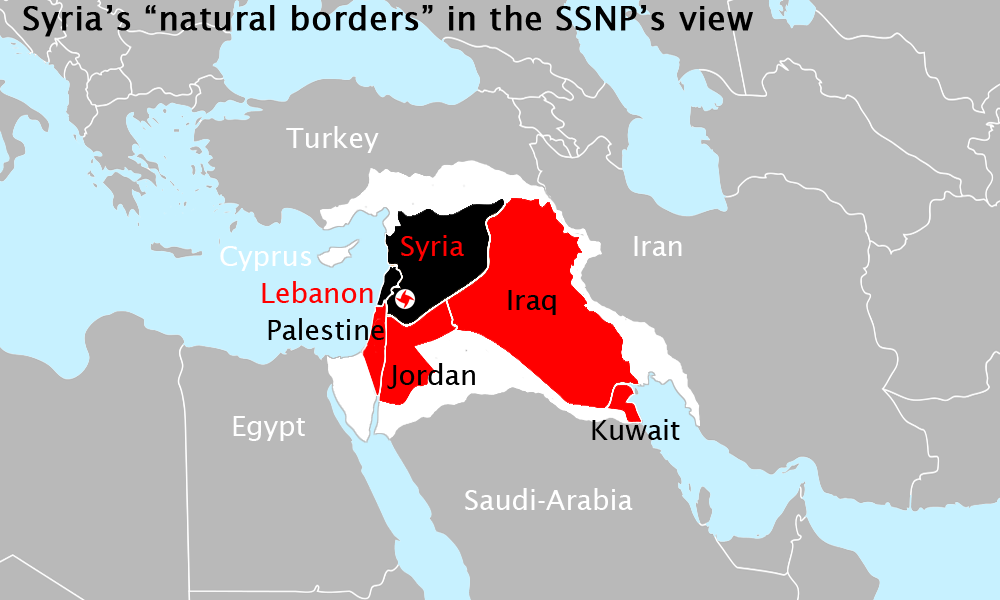
Antoun Saadeh's SSNP map of a "Natural Syria", based on the etymological connection between the name "Syria" and "Assyria"

The boundaries of the region have changed throughout history, and were last defined in modern times by the proclamation of the short-lived Arab Kingdom of Syria and subsequent definition by French and British mandatory agreement. The area was passed to French and British Mandates following World War I and divided into Greater Lebanon, various Syrian-mandate states, Mandatory Palestine and the Emirate of Transjordan. The Syrian-mandate states were gradually unified as the State of Syria and finally became the independent Syria in 1946. Throughout this period, Antoun Saadeh and his party, the Syrian Social Nationalist Party, envisioned "Greater Syria" or "Natural Syria", based on the etymological connection between the name "Syria" and "Assyria", as encompassing the Sinai Peninsula, Cyprus, modern Syria, Lebanon, Palestine, Jordan, Iraq, Israel, Kuwait, the Arab Ahwaz region of Iran, and the Kilikian region of Turkey.

== Religious significance ==
The region has sites that are significant to Abrahamic religions:

Place	Description	Image
Acre	Acre is home to the Shrine of Baháʼu'lláh, which is the holiest site for the Baháʼí Faith.	
Aleppo	Aleppo is home to a Great Mosque, which is believed to house the remains of Zechariah.	
Bethlehem	Bethlehem has sites which are significant for Jews, Christians and Muslims. One of these is Rachel's Tomb, which is revered by members of all three faiths. Another is the Church of the Nativity (of Jesus), revered by Christians, and nearby, the Mosque of Omar, revered by Muslims.	
Damascus	The Old City has a Great Mosque which is considered to be one of the largest and best preserved mosques from the Umayyad era. It is believed to house the remains of Zechariah's son John the Baptist. The city is also home to the Sayyidah Zainab Mosque, the shrine of Zaynab bint Ali, and Sayyidah Ruqayya Mosque, the shrine of Ruqayya, both sites holy to Shia Muslims.	
Haifa	Haifa is where the Shrine of the Báb is located. It is holy to the Baháʼí Faith. Nearby is Mount Carmel. Being associated with the Biblical figure Elijah, it is important to Christians, Druze, Jews and Muslims.	
Hebron	The Old City is home to the Cave of the Patriarchs, where the Biblical figures Abraham, his wife Sarah, their son Isaac, his wife Rebecca, their son Jacob, and his wife Leah are believed buried, and thus revered by followers of the Abrahamic faiths.	
Hittin	Hittin is near what is believed to near the shrine of Shuaib (possibly Jethro). It is holy to Druze and Muslims.	
Jericho / An-Nabi Musa	Near the city of Jericho in the West Bank is the shrine of Nabi Musa (literally: Prophet Moses), which is considered by Muslims to be the burial place of Moses.	
Jerusalem	The Old City is home to many sites of seminal religious importance for the three major Abrahamic religions—Judaism, Christianity, and Islam. These sites include the Temple Mount, Church of the Holy Sepulchre, Al-Aqsa and the Western Wall. It is regarded as the holiest city in Judaism, and the third-holiest in Sunni Islam.	
Mount Gerizim	In Samaritanism, Mount Gerizim is the holiest site on earth, and the location chosen by God to build a temple. In their tradition, it is the oldest and most central mountain in the world, towering above the Great Flood and providing the first land for Noah's disembarkation. In their belief, it is also the location where Abraham almost sacrificed his son Isaac.	

== See also ==
- Cradle of civilization
- Crusader states
- Mashriq
- Middle East
- Names of the Levant
- Southern Levant
- Wildlife of the Levant

== Citations ==
- Dictionary of Modern Written Arabic by Hans Wehr (4th edition, 1994).
- Michael Provence, "The Great Syrian Revolt and the Rise of Arab Nationalism", University of Texas Press, 2005.
