= Archdiocese of Hierapolis in Syria =

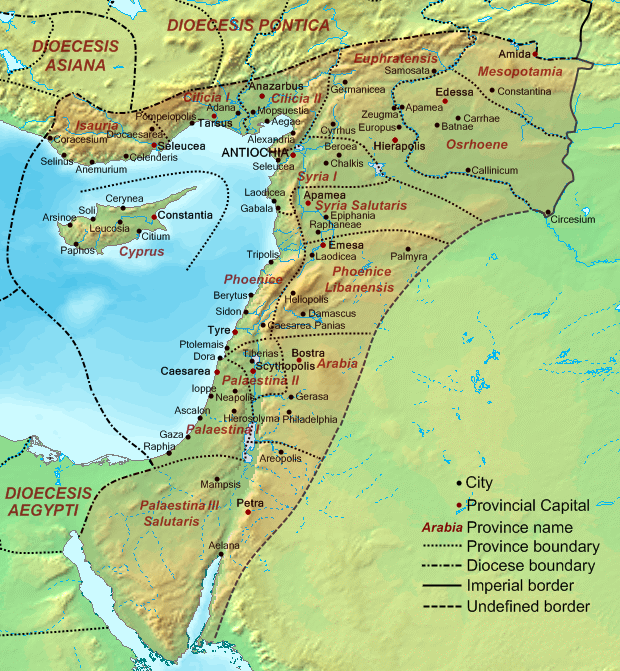
Map of the Roman Diocese of the East showing Euphratensis and it seat, Hierapolis, in the 4th century

The archdiocese of Hierapolis in Syria was the metropolitan bishopric of the ecclesiastical province of the Euphratensis. It was based in the city of Hierapolis in Syria (Arabic Manbij, Syriac Mabbug). It was traditionally the fifth see in dignity under the Patriarch of Antioch. Under the Patriarch Athanasius I in the sixth century, it had nine suffragan bishoprics.

During the Crusades, a Latin archbishop of Hierapolis was established at Dülük. He usually resided in Tell Bashir, as did the Syriac Orthodox bishops in the Crusader period. The diocese was set up between 1131 and 1134 by Count Joscelin II of Edessa. It was subject to the Latin Patriarch of Antioch. It had two suffragan sees, Marash and Kesoun. It was effectively lost by 1151.

== Bishops ==
=== Greek Orthodox bishops ===
- Philotimus, attended the Council of Nicaea (325)
- Theodotus, attended the Council of Constantinople (381)
- Alexander, attended the Council of Ephesus (431), deposed for heresy
- Panolbius, succeeded Alexander
- John, succeeded Panolbius
- Stephen I, succeeded John in 446, still in office in 456
- Cyrus, deposed 485
- Philoxenus, ordained in 485 by Peter the Fuller, died in 523
- Theodore, attended the Council of Constantinople (553)
- Stephen II, a contemporary of Evagrius Scholasticus (died 594) who wrote a biography of Saint Golinduch (died 591)
- Agapius (died after 942)

=== Syriac Orthodox bishops ===
- Thomas of Harqel (fl. c. 600)

The following Syriac Orthodox bishops are mentioned in the work of the 12th-century patriarch Michael the Great.

- Sergius
- Abram
- Simon
- John I
- Michael
- Theodore
- James
- Timothy
- Philoxenus I Mathusalah
- Philoxenus II
- Ignatius
- John II
- Philoxenus III

In 1148, John Bar Andras, bishop of Mabbug, exchanged dioceses with Timothy, bishop of Kesoun, contrary to canon law and was forced to resign.

=== Latin archbishops ===
- Franco, attached his seal to a document of 1134

Titular bishops:

- Julien-François-Pierre Carmené (24 March 1898 – 23 August 1908)
- Louis-François Sueur (1 December 1908 – 7 October 1914)
- Angelo Maria Dolci (13 November 1914 – 16 March 1933)
- Tommaso Trussoni (9 April 1934 – 21 December 1940)
- Tommaso Valerio Valeri (14 August 1942 – 20 November 1950)
- Leone Giacomo Ossola (12 June 1951 – 17 October 1951)
- Rosalvo Costa Rêgo (3 March 1952 – 3 February 1954)
- Ermenegildo Florit (12 July 1954 – 9 March 1962)
- Antonio del Giudice (18 April 1962 – 20 August 1982)
