= Paltus =

Ancient Greek ruined city in modern Syria

- Location within Syria
- 35°16′02″N 35°55′32″E
- Location: Syria
- Region: Latakia Governorate

Paltus may also refer to a Russian Kilo class submarine

Paltus or Paltos (Greek: Πάλτος) was an ancient city now ruined.

It was a bishopric, a suffragan of Seleucia Pieria in the Roman province of Syria Prima, that, no longer being a residential see, is included in the Catholic Church's list of titular sees. The ruins of Paltus may be seen at Belde (Arab al-Mulk) at the south of Nahr al-Sin or Nahr al-Melek, the ancient Badan.

Strabo records a tradition, attributed to Simonides' dithyramb Memnon (one of the Deliaca), that the hero Memnon was buried near Paltus in Syria, on the banks of the river Badas.

The town was founded by a colony from Arvad or Aradus (Arrianus, Anab. II, xiii, 17). It is located in Syria by Pliny the Elder (Hist. Natur., V, xviii) and Ptolemy (V, xiv, 2); Strabo (XV, iii, 2; XVI, ii, 12) places it near the river Badan.

In 43 BC, Gaius Cassius Longinus was encamped at or near Paltus with a large force while blockading the forces of Publius Cornelius Dolabella at Laodicea in Syria.

The Byzantine emperor Justinian I separated Paltus, together with Laodicea in Syria and Gabala, from the province of First Syria and combined them with Balanea to form the new province of Theodorias.

From the sixth century according to the Notitia episcopatuum of Anastasius [Échos d'Orient, X, (1907), 144] it was an autocephalous archdiocese and depended on the patriarch of Antioch. In the tenth century it still existed and its precise limits are known [Échos d'Orient, X (1907), 97].

Le Quien (Oriens christianus, II, 799) mentions five of its bishops:

- Cymatius, friend of St. Athanasius, and Patricius, his successor
- Severus (381)
- Sabbas at the Council of Chalcedon in 451 AD
- John, exiled by the Monophysites and reinstated by Emperor Justin I in 518.
