= Archdiocese of Hierapolis =

Archdiocese of Hierapolis may refer to:

- Archdiocese of Hierapolis in Phrygia
- Archdiocese of Hierapolis in Syria (also called Mabbug or Manbij)
