= Roman Syria =

Roman province located in modern-day Turkey, Syria, and Lebanon

Coordinates: 36°12′N 36°09′E

Provincia Syria ἐπαρχία Συρίας eparchía Syrías
- Province of the Roman Empire
- 64 BCE–198 CE
- Roman Syria highlighted in 125 AD
- Capital: Antioch (now Antakya, Hatay Province, Turkey)
- History
  - Conquest of Coele-Syria by Pompey: 64 BCE
  - Province divided into Coele Syria and Phoenice: 198 CE
Preceded by
Seleucis of Syria
Coele-Syria
Herodian Tetrarchy ∟Iturea ∟Trachonitis
Succeeded by
Coele Syria (Roman province)
Phoenice (Roman province)
- Today part of: Syria; Lebanon; Turkey

Roman Syria was an early Roman province annexed to the Roman Republic in 64 BCE by Pompey in the Third Mithridatic War following the defeat of the King of Armenia, Tigranes the Great, who had become the protector of the Seleucid Empire. The last few centuries of Roman Syria, before the region's incorporation into the Rashidun Caliphate, are called Late antique Syria.

Following the partition of the Herodian kingdom into the Tetrarchy in 4 BCE, it was gradually absorbed into Roman provinces, with Roman Syria annexing the northern tetrarch's territory: Iturea and Trachonitis. By the late 2nd century, the province was divided into Coele Syria and Syria Phoenice.

== Provincia Syria ==
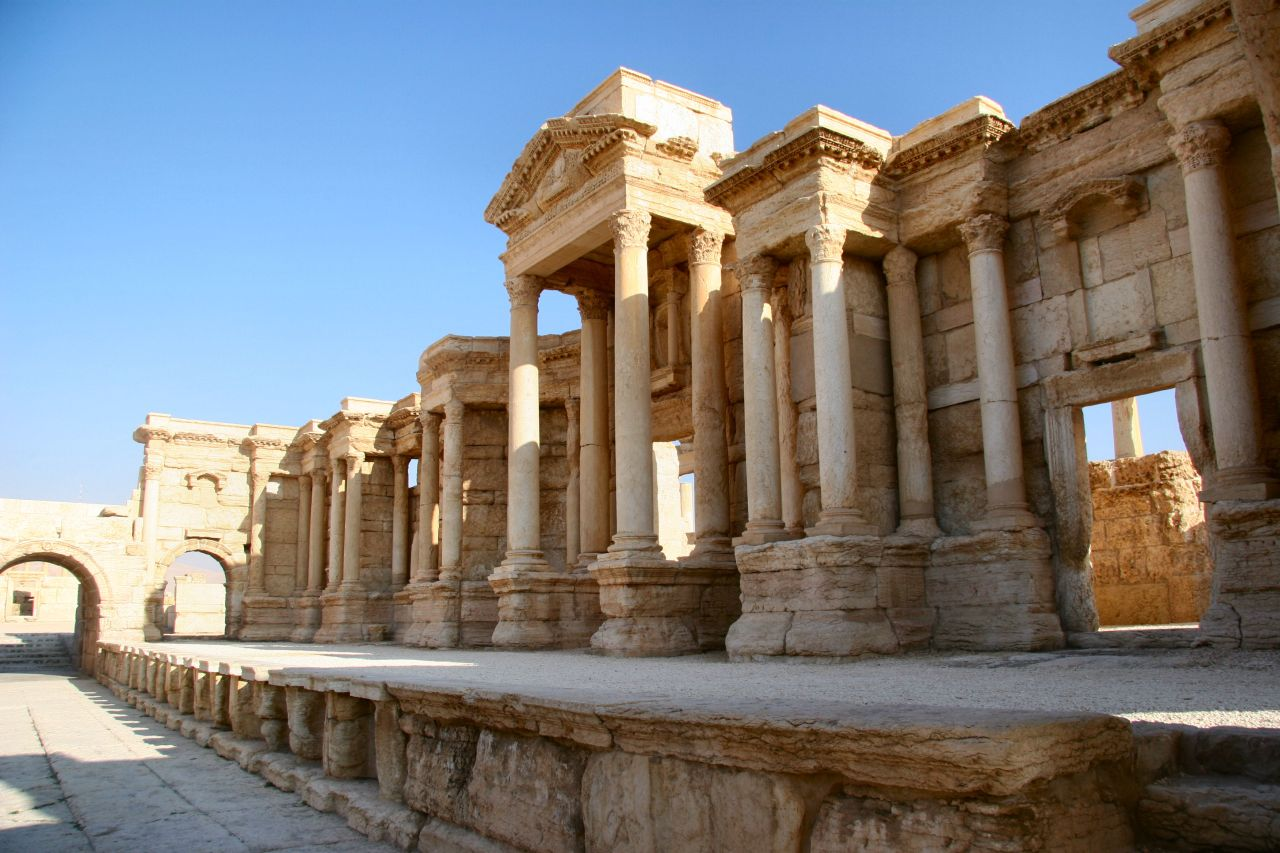
The ancient city of Palmyra was an important trading center and possibly Roman Syria's most prosperous city

The Roman Empire in the time of Hadrian (ruled 117–138 AD), showing, in western Asia, the imperial province of Syria, with four legions deployed in 125 AD. (During the Principate)

Syria was annexed to the Roman Republic in 64 BC, when Pompey the Great had the Seleucid king Antiochus XIII Asiaticus executed and deposed his successor Philip II Philoromaeus. Pompey appointed Marcus Aemilius Scaurus to the post of governor of Syria.

Following the fall of the Roman Republic and its transformation into the Roman Empire, Syria became a Roman imperial province, governed by a legatus (legate). During the early empire, the Roman army in Syria accounted for three legions with auxiliaries who defended the border with Parthia.

In 6 AD, Emperor Augustus deposed the ethnarch Herod Archelaus and united Judea, Samaria and Idumea into the Roman province of Judea; such province was placed under the direct authority of the Legate of Syria Publius Sulpicius Quirinius, who appointed Coponius as Prefect of Judea. Following the death of Herod Philip II (34 AD) and the removal of Herod Antipas (39 AD) Ituraea, Trachonitis, Galilee and Perea were also transferred under the jurisdiction of the province of Syria.

From 37 to 41 AD, much of the southern region was separated from Syria and transformed into a client kingdom under Herod Agrippa I. After Agrippa's death, his kingdom was gradually re-absorbed into the Roman Empire, until it was officially transformed into a Roman province following the death of Herod Agrippa II.

Syrian province forces were directly engaged in the First Jewish–Roman War of 66–70 AD. In 66 AD, Cestius Gallus, legate of Syria, brought the Syrian army, based on Legio XII Fulminata, reinforced by auxiliary troops, to restore order in Judaea and quell the revolt. The legion, however, was ambushed and destroyed by Jewish rebels at the Battle of Beth Horon, a result that shocked the Roman leadership. The future emperor Vespasian was then put in charge of subduing the Jewish revolt. In the summer of 69, Vespasian, with the Syrian units supporting him, launched his bid to become Roman emperor. He defeated his rival Vitellius and ruled as emperor for ten years when he was succeeded by his son Titus.

Based on an inscription recovered from Dor in 1948, Gargilius Antiquus was known to have been the governor of a province in the eastern part of the Empire, possibly Syria, between his consulate and governing Asia. In November 2016, an inscription in Greek was recovered off the coast of Dor by Haifa University underwater archaeologists, which attests that Antiquus was governor of the province of Judea between 120 and 130, possibly prior to the Bar Kokhba revolt.

As related by Theodor Mommsen,

The governor of Syria retained the civil administration of the whole large province undiminished, and held for long alone in all Asia a command of the first rank. [...] It was only in the course of the second century that a diminution of his prerogatives occurred, when Hadrian took one of the four legions from the governor of Syria and handed it over to the governor of Palestine.

== Aftermath ==
=== Division into Coele Syria and Syria Phoenice ===
Provincia Coele Syria ἐπαρχία Κοίλης Συρίας
- Province of the Roman Empire
- 198–end of 4th century
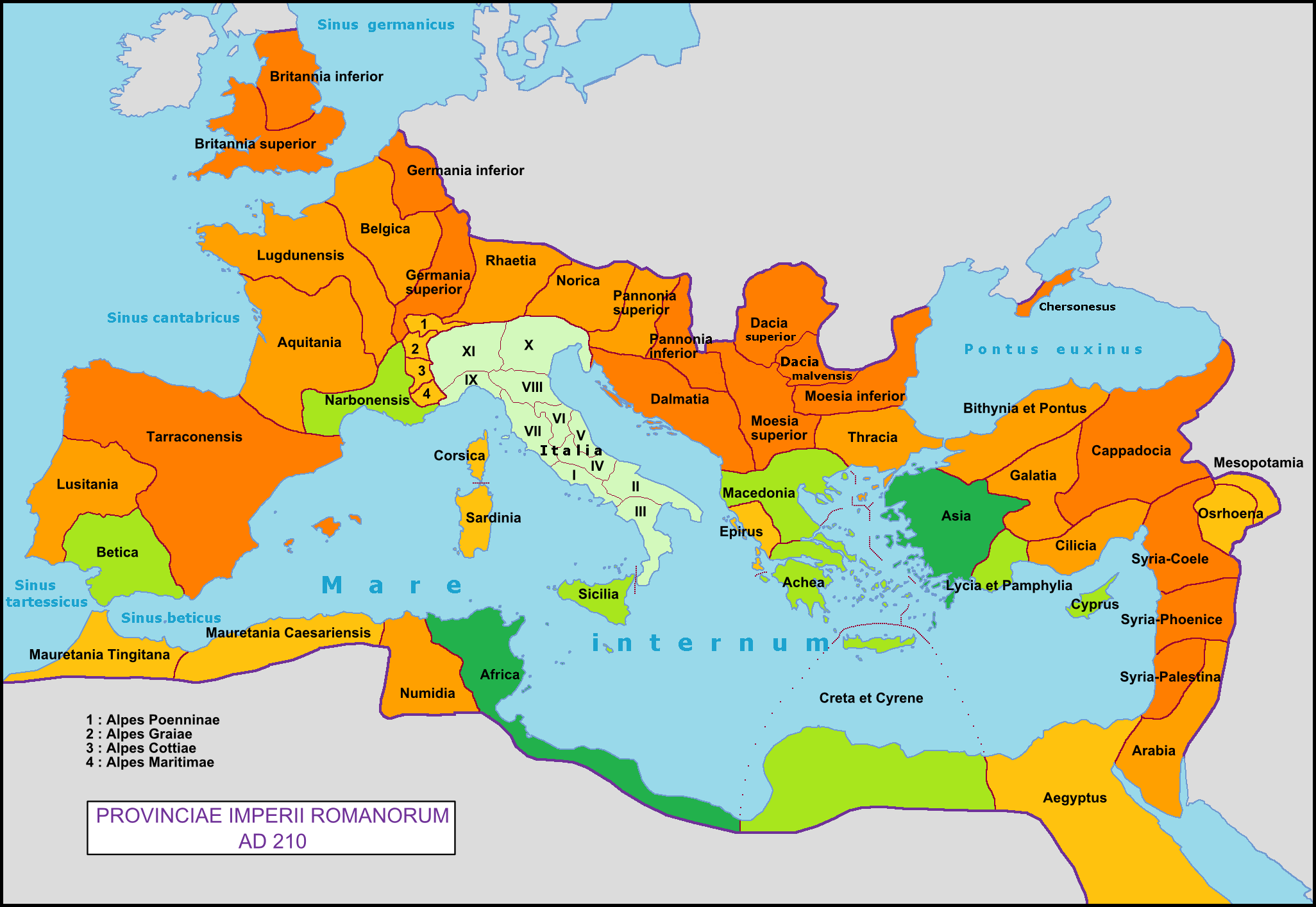
- Roman Empire in 210
- Capital: Antioch
- History
  - Established: 198
  - Disestablished: end of 4th century
Preceded by	Succeeded by
Syria (Roman province)	Syria Prima; Syria Secunda
- Today part of: Lebanon; Syria; Turkey

Provincia Syria Phoenice
- Province of the Roman Empire
- 198–end of 4th century
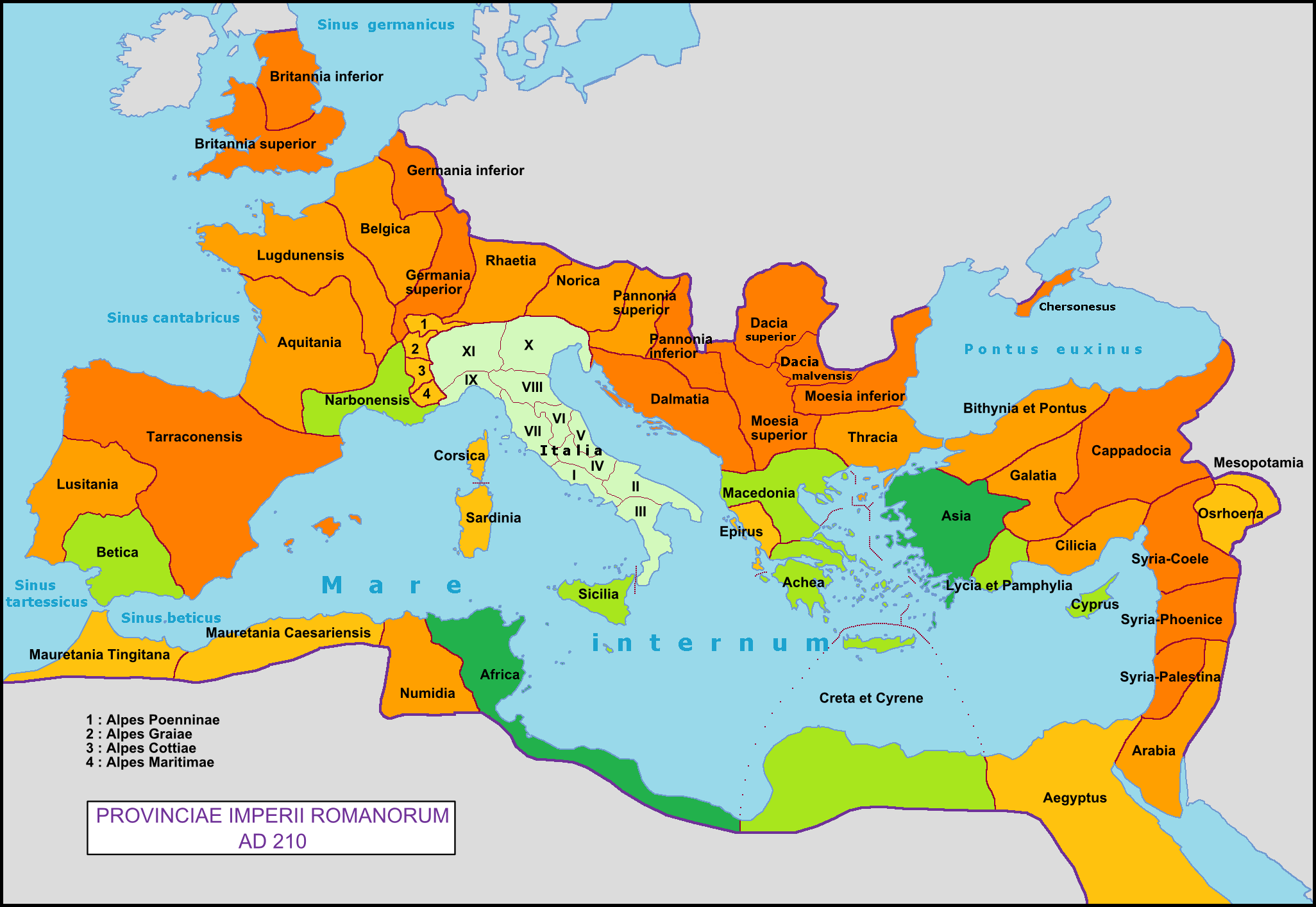
- Roman Empire in 210
- Capital: Tyre
- History
  - Established: 198
  - Disestablished: end of 4th century
Preceded by	Succeeded by
Syria (Roman province); Syria Palaestina	Phoenice Paralia; Phoenice Libanensis

Septimius Severus divided the province of Syria proper into Syria Coele and Syria Phoenice, with Antioch and Tyre as their respective provincial capitals.

As related by Theodor Mommsen,

It was Severus who at length withdrew the first place in the Roman military hierarchy from the Syrian governor. After having subdued the province—which had wished at that time to make Niger emperor, as it had formerly done with its governor Vespasian—amidst resistance from the capital Antioch in particular, he ordained its partition into a northern and a southern half, and gave to the governor of the former, which was called Coele-Syria, two legions, to the governor of the latter, the province of Syro-Phoenicia, one [legion].

From the later 2nd century, the Roman Senate included several notable Syrians, including Claudius Pompeianus and Avidius Cassius.

Syria was of crucial strategic importance during the Crisis of the Third Century. In 244 AD, Rome was ruled by a native Syrian from Philippopolis (modern day Shahba) in the province of Arabia Petraea. The emperor was Marcus Iulius Philippus, more commonly known as Philip the Arab. Philip became the 33rd emperor of Rome upon its millennial celebration.

Roman Syria was invaded in 252/253 (the date is disputed) after a Roman field army was destroyed in the Battle of Barbalissos by the King of Persia Shapur I which left the Euphrates river unguarded and the region was pillaged by the Persians. In 259/260 a similar event happened when Shapur I again defeated a Roman field army and captured the Roman emperor, Valerian, alive at the Battle of Edessa. Again, Roman Syria suffered as cities were captured, sacked and pillaged.

From 268 to 273, Syria was part of the breakaway Palmyrene Empire.

The 'Orient' in the time of Septimius Severus c. 200 AD
Coele Syria	Provincia Syria Coele
Phoenicia	Provincia Syria Phoenice
Palaestina	Provincia Syria Palaestina
Arabia	Provincia Arabia Petraea

=== Dominate reform ===
Following the reforms of Diocletian, Syria Coele became part of the Diocese of the East. Sometime between 330 and 350 (likely c. 341), the province of Euphratensis was created out of the territory of Syria Coele along the western bank of the Euphrates and the former Kingdom of Commagene, with Hierapolis as its capital.

=== Syria in the Byzantine Empire ===
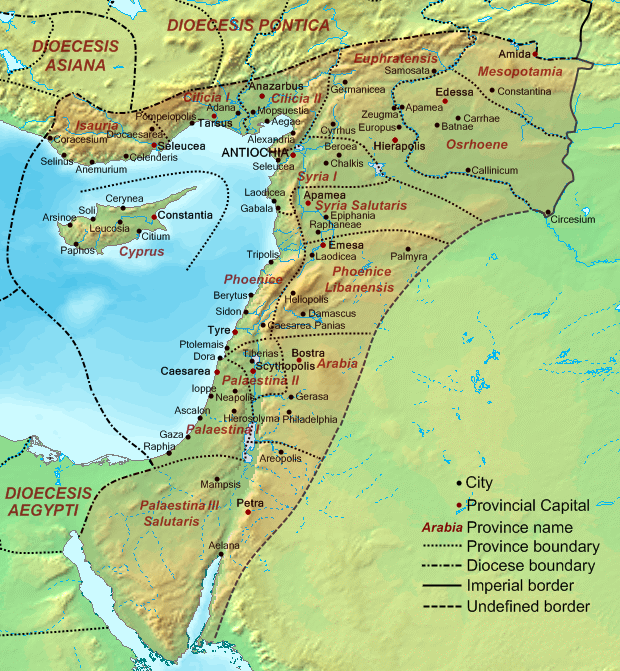
The Diocese of the East c. 400

Under the Byzantine Empire, Roman Syria was governed as part of the Diocese of the East, which was collectively one of the major commercial, agricultural, religious and intellectual areas of the empire. Its strategic location facing the Sassanid Empire and nomadic tribes also gave it exceptional military importance.

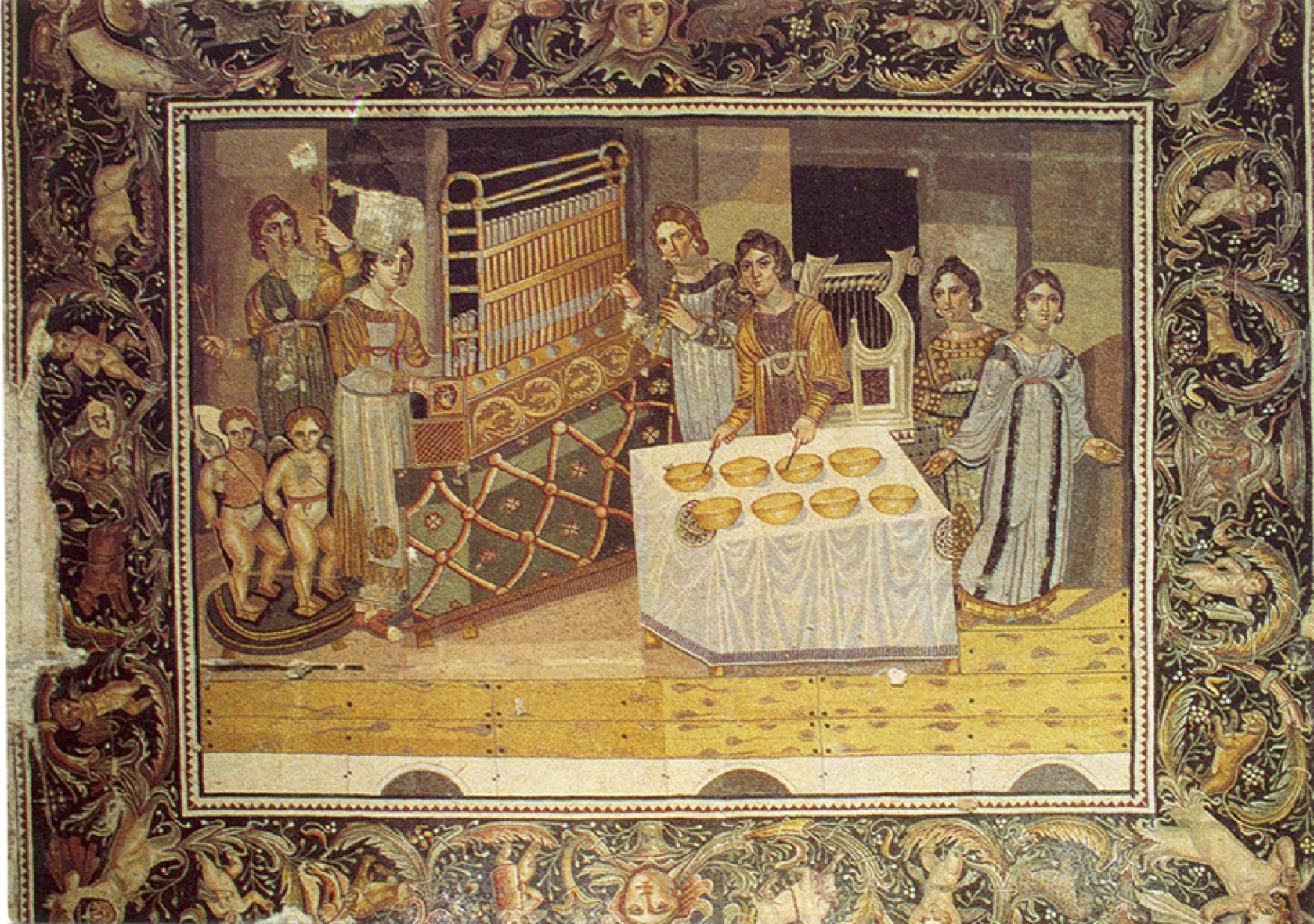
20 square meter Byzantine era mosaic found in Maryamin, Syria, currently located in the Hama museum

After c. 415, Syria Coele was further subdivided into Syria I (or Syria Prima), with its capital remaining at Antioch, and Syria II (Syria Secunda) or Syria Salutaris, with its capital at Apamea on the Orontes. In 528, Justinian I carved out the small coastal province Theodorias out of territory from both provinces.

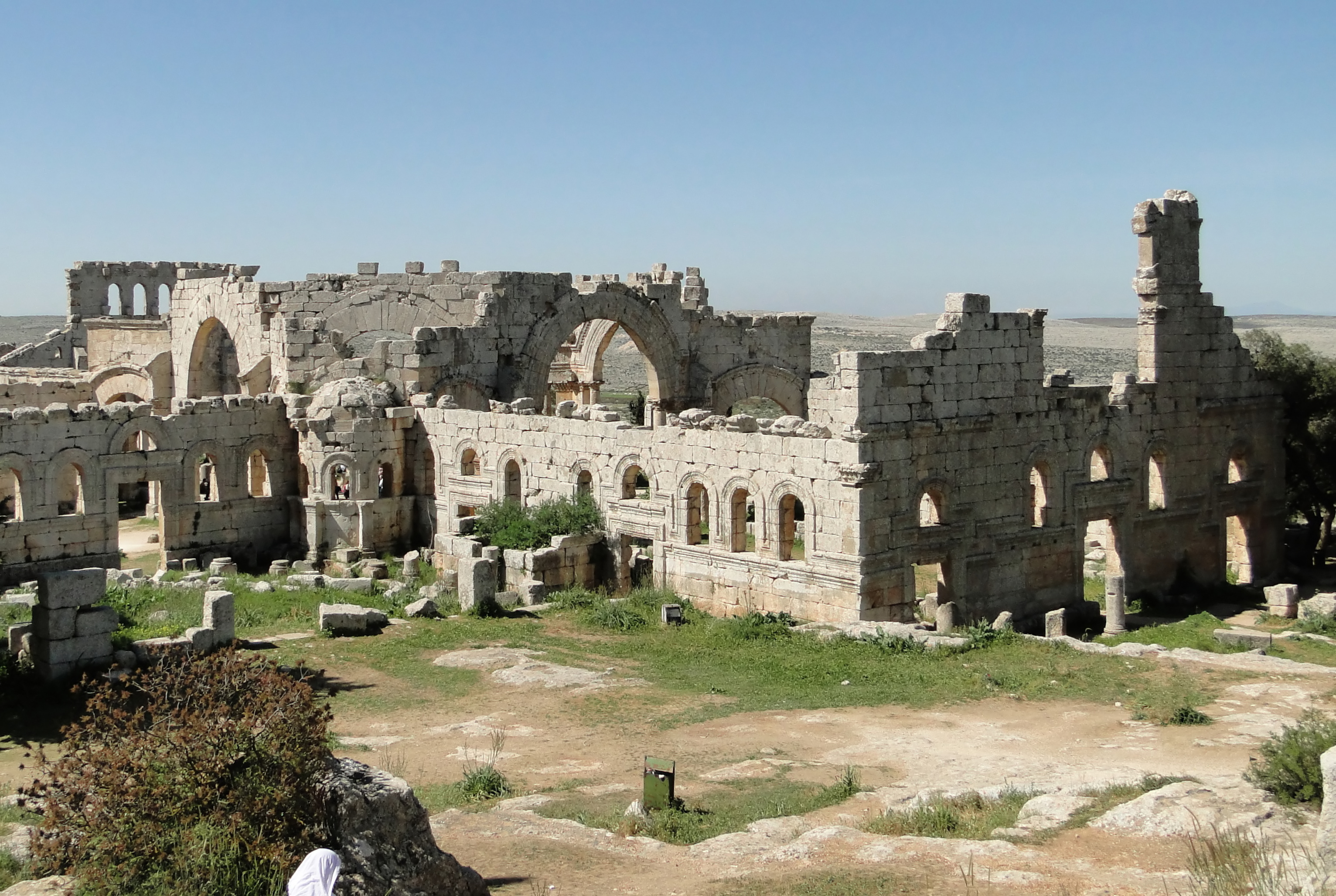
Church of Saint Simeon Stylites, one of the oldest surviving churches in the world

The region remained one of the most important provinces of the Byzantine Empire. It was occupied by the Sasanians between 609 and 628, then reconquered by the emperor Heraclius, but lost again to the advancing Muslims after the Battle of Yarmouk and the fall of Antioch. The city of Antioch was reconquered by Nikephorus Phocas in 963, along with other parts of the country, at that time under the Hamdanids, although still under the official suzerainty of the Abbasid caliphs and also claimed by the Fatimid caliphs. After emperor John I Tzimiskes failed to conquer Syria up to Jerusalem, a Muslim reconquest of Syria followed in the late 970s undertaken by the Fatimid Caliphate that resulted in the ousting of the Byzantines from most parts of Syria. However, Antioch and other northern parts of Syria remained in the empire and other parts were under the protection of the emperors through their Hamdanid, Mirdasid, and Marwanid proxies, until the Seljuk arrival, who after three decades of incursions, conquered Antioch in 1084. Antioch was captured again during the 12th century by the revived armies of the Comnenii. However, by that time the city was regarded as part of Asia Minor and not of Syria.

== Demographics ==
Syria had a diverse demographic distribution. The rural inland was mostly populated by Aramaic speakers descended from various West Semitic peoples who inhabited Syria. Arabs were settled throughout Hauran, Trachonitis and Emesa which they controlled. Arabs were also part of Palmyra's composition, which included Aramaeans, Arabs and Amorites. The Phoenician coast maintained a Phoenician-speaking majority well into the end of 2nd century, and their main urban centers included Tyre, Sidon and Berytus.

On the other hand, Greeks comprised a majority in Hellenistic urban centers such Antioch, Apamea, Cyrrhus and the Decapolis, which had been settled by Greeks under Seleucid patronage.

Estimates for the population of the entire Levant in the 1st century vary from 3.5–4 million to 6 million, levels only matched even by 19th century levels. Urban centers peaked and so did population density in the rural settlements. Antioch and Palmyra reached a peak of 200,000–250,000 inhabitants, while Apamea counted 117,000 'free citizens' circa AD 6. Combined with their dependancies and villages, Apamea and Cyrrhus may have counted as high as 500,000 each. The Syrian Coastal Mountain Range, marginal hill country, were less densely settled and had a population of around 40–50,000.

== Identity ==
The inhabitants of Syria adopted Greek customs while maintaining elements of Near Eastern culture. The continuity of pre-Hellenistic cultures was inconsistent across different regions, and where it existed, it varied, including Aramean, Phoenician, and neo-Hittite influences. However, many areas documented exclusively Greek elements.

In contrast to Jews, who shared collective historical memories, Syrians lacked a unified cultural or social identity. The unifying aspects in Roman Syria were Greek civic structures and narratives promoted by Roman imperial rule, suggesting that Syrian culture was largely defined through Greek and Roman influences. The term 'Syrian' therefore primarily functioned as a geographical designation.

== Episcopal sees ==
Ancient episcopal sees of the late Roman province of Syria Prima (I) listed in the Annuario Pontificio as titular sees:

- Anasartha (Khanasir)
- Barcusus (Baquza or Banqusa)
- Beroea (Aleppo)
- Chalcis in Syria (Qinnasrin)
- Gabala (Jableh)
- Gabula (at the marsh of Al-Jabbul)
- Gindarus (Jandairis)
- Laodicea in Syria (Latakia)
- Salamias (Salamiyah)
- Seleucia Pieria

Ancient episcopal sees of the late Roman province of Syria Secunda (II) listed in the Annuario Pontificio as titular sees:

- Apamea in Syria, the Metropolitan Archdiocese
- Arethusa (Al-Rastan)
- Balanea (Baniyas)
- Epiphania in Syria (Hama)
- Larissa in Syria (Shaizar)
- Mariamme (Maryamin)
- Raphanea
- Seleucobelus (Seleucopolis)

== See also ==
- History of Syria
- Ottoman Syria
- Assyria (Roman province)
- List of governors of Roman Syria

== Sources ==
- Adkins, Lesley; Adkins, Roy A. (1998). Handbook to Life in Ancient Rome. Oup USA. ISBN 978-0-19-512332-6.
- Marquardt, Joachim (1892). L'organisation de l'Empire romain.
- Mommsen, Theodor (1886). The History of Rome. R. Bentley.
