= Agapius of Hierapolis =

10th century Arabic Christian historian

Agapius (Note: Also Agapios or Aghābiyūs) of Hierapolis, also called Maḥbūb ibn Qusṭanṭīn (Note: Arabic: محبوب إبن قسطنطين, lit. 'Agapius son of Constantine'; sometimes also called al-Rūmī al-Manbijī 'the Byzantine [Roman] from Manbij') (died after 942), was a Melkite Christian historian and the bishop of Manbij in Syria. (Note: Arabic Manbij = Syriac Mabbūg, Greek Hierapolis) He wrote a universal history in Arabic, the lengthy Kitāb al-ʿunwān ('book of the title'). He was a contemporary of the annalist Eutychius (Said al-Bitriq), also a Melkite.

== Writings ==
His history commences with the foundation of the world and runs up to his own times. The portion dealing with the Arab period is extant only in a single manuscript and breaks off in the second year of the caliphate of al-Mahdi (160AH = 776–7 AD) and during the time when Emperor was Leo IV (775–780).

For the early history of Christianity, Agapius made use uncritically of apocryphal and legendary materials. For the following secular and ecclesiastical history, he relied on Syriac sources, in particular the World Chronicle of the Maronite historian Theophilus of Edessa (d. 785) for the end of the Umayyad period and the beginning of the Abbasids. He made use of Eusebius's Church History only through an intermediary compilation of short extracts. This he supplements from other sources. He gives an otherwise unknown fragment of Papias; and a list of Eastern Metropolitans. He uses the lost History of Bardaisan, but many of his sources remain unknown. He was the first Eastern writer to call Tatian a heretic.

The History has been published with a French translation in the Patrologia Orientalis series and with a Latin translation in the Corpus Scriptorum Christianorum Orientalium series.

His history contains a version of the Testimonium Flavianum that lacks many of the most clearly Christian elements of the text in surviving Josephus manuscripts.

== Editions ==
- Alexander Vassiliev (ed.), Kitab al-'Unvan (Universal History), Patrologia Orientalis, No. 5 (1910), 7 (1911), 8 (1912), 11 (1915).
- Robert G. Hoyland (ed.), Theophilus of Edessa's Chronicle and the Circulation of Historical Knowledge in Late Antiquity and Early Islam. Liverpool University Press, Liverpool 2011 (Translated Texts for Historians).
- Louis Cheikho (ed.), Agapius episcopus Mabbugensis. Historia universalis, CSCO 65, 1912.
- Robert G. Hoyland: Seeing Islam as Others Saw It. A Survey and Evaluation of Christian, Jewish and Zoroastrian Writings on Early Islam. Darwin Press, Princeton 1997, S. 440–442.
- Lucien Malouf: Agapios of Hierapolis. In: New Catholic Encyclopedia. 2. Auflage. Band 1, Detroit 2003, S. 173.
