= Eusebius of Laodicea =

Alexandrian deacon, confessor and bishop of Laodicea in Syria

Eusebius of Laodicea (Ancient Greek: Εὐσέβιος; date of birth uncertain; died about 268) was an Alexandrian, a deacon who had some fame as a confessor, and became bishop of Laodicea in Syria.

== Life ==
His story is told by Eusebius of Cæsarea. As a deacon at Alexandria he had accompanied his bishop, Dionysius (with a priest, two other deacons and two Romans who were then in Egypt) before the tribunal of Æmilian, Prefect of Egypt, at the time of Emperor Valerianus (253-260). Dionysius tells the story of their trials in a letter to a certain Bishop Germanus. They were all sentenced to banishment, but Eusebius managed to remain in the city in hiding, "zealously served the confessors in prison and buried the bodies of the dead and the blessed martyrs, not without danger to his own life". In 260 there broke out a rebellion at Alexandria and at the same time a plague ravaged the city. Eusebius again risked his life by continually nursing the sick and wounded.

The Romans besieged parts of the town (Bruchium, Pyroucheion, Prouchion). Anatolius, Eusebius' friend, was among the besieged, Eusebius himself outside. Eusebius went to the Roman general and asked him to allow anyone who would leave Bruchium. His petition was granted and Anatolius, with whom he managed to communicate, explained the matter to the leaders of the rebellion and implored them to capitulate. They refused but eventually allowed the women, children, and old men to profit from the Romans' mercy. A great crowd then came to surrender at the Roman camp. "Eusebius there nursed all who were exhausted by the long siege with every care and attention as a father and physician."

In 264 Dionysius (who seems to have come back from banishment) sent Eusebius as his delegate to Syria to represent him at the discussions that were taking place concerning the affair of Paul of Samosata. Anatolius accompanied his friend. The Syrians were so impressed by these two Egyptians that they kept them both and made Eusebius Bishop of Laodicea as successor to Socrates. Not long afterwards he died and was succeeded by Anatolius.

The date of his death is uncertain. Adolf Harnack thinks it was before the major Synod of Antioch in 268. Another theory is that the siege of Alexandria was in 269, that the friends went to Syria at the end of that year, and that Eusebius's death was not until 279. Pius Bonifacius Gams puts his death in 270. Eusebius's name does not occur in the acts of the synod in 268.

== See also ==
- Baronius, Annales ecclesiastici, ad av. 263, 8-11;
- Louis Duchesne, Hist. Ancienne de l'eglise (Paris, 1906), I, 488-489.
