= Stephen of Hierapolis =

7th century bishop in Syria

Stephen of Hierapolis (Greek: Στέφανος, fl. 600 AD) was a bishop of Hierapolis Bambyce, Byzantine Empire. Stephen was the author of a hagiography of St. Golindouch, who was his guest in Hierapolis after escaping martyrdom under Hormizd IV.

Based on that text, we can conclude that Stephen was a Chalcedonian.
