= Alexander of Hierapolis (Syria) =

5th-century Bishop of Hierapolis

Alexander of Hierapolis (Gr. Ἀλέξανδρος) (fl. 431) was a bishop of Hierapolis Bambyce in Roman Syria.

Alexander was sent by John, bishop of Antioch, to advocate the cause of Nestorius at the Council of Ephesus. His hostility to Cyril of Alexandria was such that he openly charged him with Apollinarism, and rejected the communion of John, Theodoret, and the other Eastern bishops, on their reconciliation with him. He appealed to the pope, but was rejected, and was at last banished by the emperor Theodosius II to the mines of Famothis in Egypt, where he died. Twenty-three letters of his are extant in Latin in the Nova Collectio Conciliorum of Étienne Baluze, p. 670, &c. Paris, 1683.
