= Golinduch =

Christian saint, convert from Zoroastrianism (died 591)

Golindouch Maria
- Born: Golindouch; Hillah, Sasanian Empire
- Died: 591; Mabbog (Hierapolis Bambyce)
- Feast: July 13

Golindouch, Golindukht, Golindokht, or Dolindokht (Greek: Γολινδούχ, Γολιανδοὺχ) (died 591) was a noble Persian lady who converted to Christianity, took the name Maria, and became a saint and martyr.

She converted from Zoroastrianism to Christianity in the reign of Khosrau I. She was persecuted and tortured under Khosrau I and Hormizd IV, and later she died in the Roman city of Mabbog (Hierapolis Bambyce) in 591.

== Sources ==
There is a Passion in Greek by Eustratios of Constantinople, which may be based on a lost version by Stephen of Hierapolis written in Syriac shortly after her death. The author of this document writes that he heard the facts from persons acquainted with the saint herself, in particular Saint Domitian, her bishop. In Greek, she is known as Αγία Γολινδούχ η Περσίδα που μετονομάστηκε Μαρία, meaning 'Saint Golindouch the Persian who was renamed Maria'. Her feast day is July 13.

There is also a medieval Passion in Georgian.

Theophylact Simocatta discusses Golindouch at length.

Evagrius Scholasticus mentions her briefly in his Ecclesiastical History, referring to Stephen of Hierapolis's Life of Golindouch and called her Golianduch (Γολιανδοὺχ).

== Bibliography ==
- Brock, Sebastian (2001). "GOLINDUCH". Encyclopaedia Iranica, Vol. XI, Fasc. 1. pp. 95–96.
- L. Bardou, "Sainte Golindouch", Échos d'Orient, 4:18 (October 1900-October 1901)
- P. Peeters, "Sainte Golindouch, martyre perse", Analecta Bollandiana 1944
- Imperial power and its subversion in Eustratius of Constantinople's "life and martyrdom of Golinduch" (c. 602)
