= Coele Syria (Roman province) =

Roman province from 198 to end of 4th century

Province of Coele Syria Provincia Coele Syria (Latin) ἐπαρχία Κοίλης Συρίας (Koine Greek)
- Province of the Roman Empire
- 198–c. 415
- Roman Empire with Coele Syria highlighted as of 210 AD
- Capital: Antioch (modern-day Antakya, Hatay, Turkey)
- History
  - Established: 198
  - Disestablished: c. 415
Preceded by	Succeeded by
Syria (Roman province)	Syria Prima; Syria Salutaris
- Today part of: Syria; Turkey

Coele Syria (Ancient Greek: Κοίλη Συρία, Koílē Syría) was a Roman province which Septimius Severus created with Syria Phoenice in 198 by dividing the province of Syria. Its metropolis was Antioch.

== History ==
As related by Theodor Mommsen:

The governor of Syria retained the civil administration of the whole large province undiminished, and held for long alone in all Asia a command of the first rank. [...] It was only in the course of the second century that a diminution of his prerogatives occurred, when Hadrian took one of the four legions from the governor of Syria and handed it over to the governor of Palestine. It was Severus who at length withdrew the first place in the Roman military hierarchy from the Syrian governor. After having subdued the province—which had wished at that time to make Niger emperor, as it had formerly done with its governor Vespasian—amidst resistance from the capital Antioch in particular, he ordained its partition into a northern and a southern half, and gave to the governor of the former, which was called Coele-Syria, two legions, to the governor of the latter, the province of Syro-Phoenicia, one [legion].

Coele Syria was further divided into Syria Prima and Syria Secunda around the end of the fourth century.

It is widely accepted that the term Coele is a transcription of Aramaic kul, meaning "all, the entire", such that the term originally identified all of Syria. The word "Coele", which literally means "hollow" in Koine Greek, is thought to have come about via a folk etymology referring to the "hollow" Beqaa Valley between Mount Lebanon and the Anti-Lebanon Mountains.

== Third-century crisis ==
Starting from 230 CE, Sasanian armies advanced into Roman Mesopotamia, besieging many Roman garrisons along the Euphrates. They also attempted, albeit unsuccessfully, to conquer Nisibis, then a significant center of trade with the East and China, and may have invaded the Roman provinces of Syria and Cappadocia. After this initial Sasanian invasion, remnants of the Roman army, including units from the Legio I Parthica and the Cohors IX Maurorum Gordiana, became stationed near Hatra. A few years later, a new invasion struck both Mesopotamia and Syria, possibly even besieging and occupying Antioch itself in 240, as indicated by the cessation of coin minting at its mint in 240 and 241.

Barbarian invasions by the Goths, Borani, and Carpi, contemporaneous with those of the Sasanians under Shapur I, occurred during the years 252-256, during the reigns of Valerian and Gallienus. During this period, several usurpers were elected by the Syrian legions (Jotapian, in 248-249 against Philip the Arab; Uranius Antoninus, in 253-254 against Trebonianus Gallus), following the ascension of Shapur I after his father Ardashir I. Shapur I, during the reign of Trebonianus Gallus (251-253), launched a new offensive against the eastern provinces of the Roman Empire. Persian troops breached the limes and occupied numerous cities in the province of Mesopotamia (including Nisibis itself), before advancing westward across the Euphrates into Cappadocia, Lycaonia, and Syria, where they defeated the incoming Roman army near Barbalissos.

Victorious in battle, the Sasanian forces seized Antioch in 253, where they destroyed numerous buildings, looted a substantial treasure, and took many prisoners. In 256, a new invasion by Shapur I seized significant border fortifications from Roman control in Syria, such as Dura-Europos, which was definitively destroyed along with the entire Roman garrison: a vexillatio of the Legio IIII Scythica and the cohors XX Palmyrenorum sagittariorum equitata. Additionally, during Shapur I's last invasion, Edessa and Carrhae were besieged to the extent that Caesar Valerian was compelled to march against the Sasanian armies, without achieving the desired success.

Over these years, Roman emperors were repeatedly forced to intervene to expel the Persian enemy from Roman territories in Syria, Cappadocia, and Mesopotamia. First came Severus Alexander, then Gordian III, and finally Valerian. However, Valerian was defeated in battle, captured by King Shapur I, and forced to spend his final years in captivity, thus paving the way for a new devastating invasion of Syrian territories, which culminated in a new occupation of the metropolis of Antioch in 260.

After Valerian's defeat in the Battle of Edessa in 260, and the revolt of the Macriani against his son Gallienus, who was occupied in the West, the situation was saved by the dynast of Palmyra, Odaenathus, who defeated the Persians and quelled the revolt, receiving in return the title of corrector totius Orientis. Palmyra became an independent state, which continued even after the death of Odaenathus, under the regency of Queen Zenobia, on behalf of her son Vaballathus, until her defeat in 274 by Aurelian.

== Bibliography ==
- Drinkwater, John (2005). "Maximinus to Diocletian". In Bowman, Alan (ed.). The Cambridge Ancient History: The Crisis of Empire, A.D. 193-337. Vol. 12 (2nd ed.). Cambridge University Press.
- Eutropio. Breviarium ab Urbe condita.
- Gatier, Pierre-Louis (2001). "« Grande » ou « petite Syrie Seconde » ? Pour une géographie historique de la Syrie intérieure protobyzantine". Conquête de la Steppe (in French). Vol. 36. pp. 91–109.
- Grant, Michael (1984). Gli imperatori romani. Storia e segreti. Roma: Newton & Compton. ISBN 88-7983-180-1.
- Gueleneer, Adolphe de (1874). Essai sur la vie et le règne de Septime Sévère (in French).
- Maricq, A. (1957). "Classica et Orientalia: 2. Les dernieres annees de Hatra: L'alliance romaine". Syria. 34 (3): 288–305.
- Millar, Fergus (1993). The Roman near East (31 BC - AD 337). Cambridge, Massachusetts & London: Harvard University Press.
- Mommsen, Theodor (1886). The History of Rome. R. Bentley.
- Rémondon, Roger (1975). La crisi dell'impero romano. Da Marco Aurelio ad Anastasio. Milano: Ugo Mursia Editore.
- Southern, Pat (2001). The Roman Empire: from Severus to Constantine. London; New York: Routledge. ISBN 0-415-23943-5.
