= Syria Prima =

Byzantine province (c.415–630s)

Provincia Syria Prima
- Province of the Byzantine Empire
- 415–630s
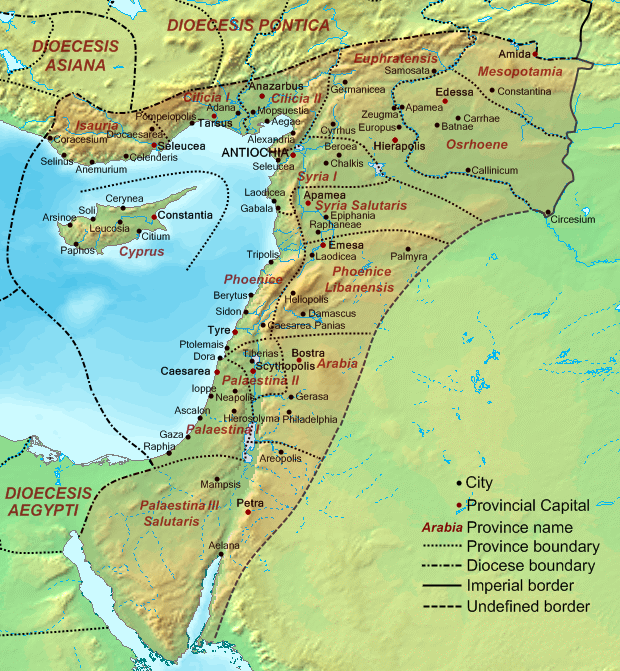
- Syria Prima within the Diocese of the East, c. 400.
- Capital: Antioch (modern-day Antakya, Hatay, Turkey)
- History
  - Established: 415
  - Disestablished: 630s
Preceded by	Succeeded by
Coele Syria (Roman province)	Bilad al-Sham
- Today part of: Syria; Turkey; Lebanon

Syria Prima or Syria I ("First Syria", in Greek: Πρώτη Συρία, Prṓtē Suríā) was a Byzantine province, formed c. 415 out of Syria Coele. The province survived until the Muslim conquest of Syria in the 630s.

== History ==
Syria I emerged out of Syria Coele, which during the reign of Antiochus III was one of the four satrapies in its region that included Phoenicia, Idumea, and an unknown territory that included Palestine. The Syria Coele region along the Euphrates was separated to form the province of Euphratensis. After c. 415 Syria Coele was further subdivided into Syria I (or Syria Prima), with the capital remaining at Antioch, and Syria II (Syria Secunda) or Syria Salutaris, with capital at Apamea on the Orontes. In 528, Justinian I carved out the small coastal province Theodorias out of territory from both provinces.

The region remained one of the most important provinces of the Byzantine Empire. It was governed by a Consularis based in Antioch. Syria Prima was occupied by the Sasanians between 609 and 628, then recovered by the emperor Heraclius, but lost again to the advancing Muslims after the Battle of Yarmouk and the fall of Antioch.
