= Theodorias (province) =

Byzantine province (528–7th Century)

Provincia Theodorias επαρχία Θεοδωριάδος
- Province of the Byzantine Empire
- 528–7th Century
- Capital: Laodicea
- Historical era: Antiquity
  - Established by emperor Justinian I: 528
  - Muslim conquest of Syria: 7th Century
Preceded by	Succeeded by
Syria Prima; Syria Secunda	Bilad al-Sham
- Today part of: Syria

Theodorias (Greek: Θεοδωριάς) was a Byzantine province created in 528 by Emperor Justinian I and named in honour of his wife, the Empress Theodora.

== History ==
It comprised a small coastal territory taken from the earlier provinces of Syria Prima and Syria Secunda. The new province remained part of the Diocese of the East. Its capital was Laodicea (in Syria; now Latakia), and it also included the cities of Paltus (Arab al-Mulk), Balaneae and Gabala. Ecclesiastically, these cities retained their former allegiances to the metropolitan bishops of Syria Prima and Secunda: Antioch and Apamea in Syria.

The province survived until the Muslim conquest of Syria in the 630s.

== Bibliography ==
- Begass, Christoph (2022). "Die Gründung der Provinz Theodorias durch Justinian". In Gengler, Olivier; Meier, Mischa (eds.). Johannes Malalas: Der Chronist als Zeithistoriker (1. Auflage ed.). Stuttgart. pp. 153–173. ISBN 978-3-515-12645-8.
