= Manbij =

City in Syria

Manbij منبج
- City
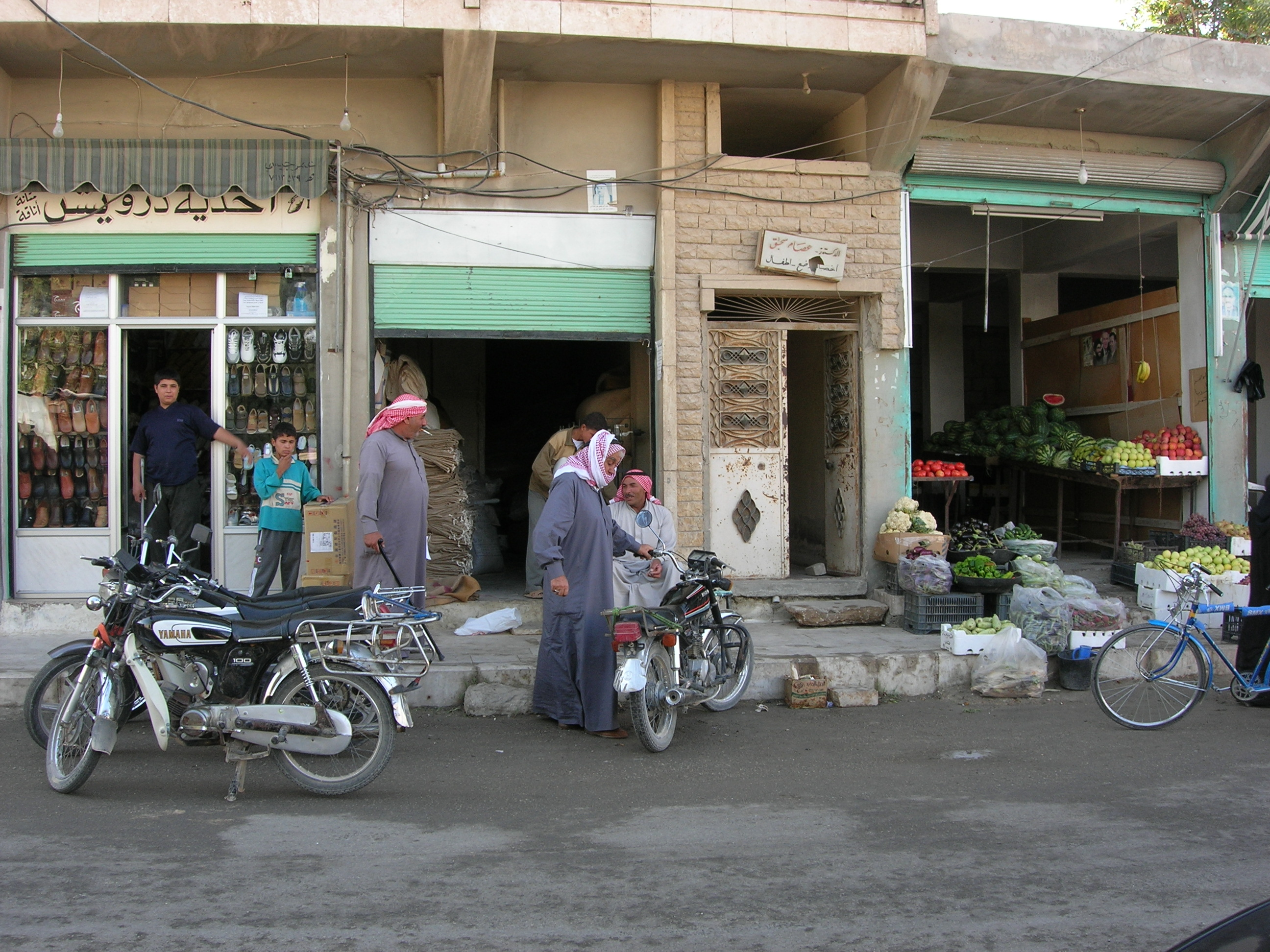
- Manbij storefronts in 2005

- Location in Syria
- Coordinates: 36°31′41″N 37°57′17″E
- Country: Syria
- Governorate: Aleppo
- District: Manbij
- Subdistrict: Manbij
- Elevation: 460 m (1,510 ft)

Population (2004)
  - Total: 99,497

Manbij (Note: Kurdish: مەنبج, romanized: Minbic; Turkish: Münbiç, Menbic, or Menbiç) (Arabic: منبج, romanized: Manbiǧ) is a city in the northeast of Aleppo Governorate in northern Syria, 30 kilometers (19 miles) west of the Euphrates. The 2004 census gives its population as nearly 100,000. The population of Manbij is largely Arab, with Kurdish, Turkmen, Circassian, and Chechen minorities. Many of its residents practice Naqshbandi Sufism.

During the Syrian civil war, the city was first captured by rebels in 2012, overrun by the Islamic State of Iraq and the Levant in 2014 and finally captured by the Syrian Democratic Forces (SDF) in 2016, bringing it into the Autonomous Administration of North and East Syria (AANES). From 2018 to 2024, after an agreement with the SDF, the Syrian Arab Army had been deployed on the city's periphery as a buffer between the Turkish occupation of Northern Syria and the AANES. On December 9, 2024, it was reported that the city came under the control of the Syrian caretaker government after a deal was reached between the U.S. and Turkey to allow the safe exit of SDF fighters. The pro-Turkish forces' control over the area did not end until the SIG was incorporated into the Syrian transitional government at the end of January 2025.

== Etymology ==
Coins struck at the city before Alexander's conquest record the Aramean name of the city as Manbug (Mnbg, "Site of the Spring"). For the Assyrians it was known as Nappigu or Nanpigi. Its name was hellenized as Bambyce (Ancient Greek: Βαμβύκη, Bambykē) and recorded by Pliny as Mabog (Classical Syriac: ܡܒܘܓ, Mabbog or Mabbogh).

As the center of the worship of the Syrian fertility goddess Atargatis, it became known to the Greeks as Hieropolis (Ἱερόπολις, Hierópolis), the "City of the Sanctuary", and then as Hierapolis (Ἱεράπολις, Hierápolis), the "Holy City".

== Cult of Atargatis ==
This worship of Atargatis was immortalized in De Dea Syria which has traditionally been attributed to Lucian of Samosata, who gave a full description of the religious cult of the shrine and the tank of sacred fish of Atargatis, of which Aelian also relates marvels. According to the De Dea Syria, the worship was of a phallic character, votaries offering little male figures of wood and bronze. There were also huge phalli set up like obelisks before the temple, which were ceremoniously climbed once a year and decorated.

The temple contained a holy chamber into which only priests were allowed to enter. A great bronze altar stood in front, set about with statues, and in the forecourt lived numerous sacred animals and birds (but not swine) used for sacrifice.

Some three hundred priests served the shrine and there were numerous minor ministrants. The lake was the centre of sacred festivities and it was customary for votaries to swim out and decorate an altar standing in the middle of the water. Self-mutilation and other orgies went on in the temple precinct, and there was an elaborate ritual on entering the city and first visiting the shrine.

== History ==
=== Antiquity ===
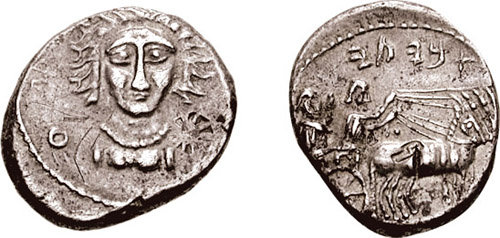
Silver didrachm of 'Abyati, Achaemenid dynast/priest of Manbog (Bambyce), dated c. 340-332 BC. Obv: "Hadad and Ateh" in Aramaic, facing female bust, wearing necklace. Rev: "Abyaty" in Aramaic, high priest and driver in chariot.

The Arameans called the city "Mnbg" (Manbug). Manbij was part of the kingdom of Bit Adini and was annexed by the Assyrians in 856 BC. The Assyrian king Shalmaneser III renamed it Lita-Ashur and built a royal palace. The city was reconquered by the Assyrian king Tiglath-Pileser III in 738 BC. The sanctuary of Atargatis predates the Macedonian conquest, as it seems that the city was the center of a dynasty of Aramean priest-kings ruling at the very end of the Achaemenid Empire; two kings are known, 'Abyati and Abd-Hadad. The fate of Abd-Hadad is not known but the city came firmly under the Macedonian empire, and prospered under the rule of the Seleucids who made it the chief station on their main road between Antioch and Seleucia on the Tigris. The temple was sacked by Crassus on his way to meet the Parthians (53 BC). The coinage of the city begins in the 4th century BC with the coins of the priest-kings followed by the Aramaic series of the Macedonian and Seleucid monarchs. They show Atargatis either as a bust with mural crown or as riding on a lion. She continues to supply the chief type even during imperial Roman times, being generally shown seated with the tympanum in her hand. Other coins substitute the legend Θεάς Συρίας Ιεροπολιτόν Theas Syrias Ieropoliton within a wreath.

In the third century, the city was the capital of Euphratensis province and one of the great cities of Roman Syria. It was, however, in a ruinous state when Julian gathered his troops there before marching to his defeat and death in Mesopotamia. Sassanid Emperor Khosrau I held it to ransom after Byzantine Emperor Justinian I had failed to defend it.

=== Middle Ages ===
The Abbasid caliph Harun al-Rashid restored Manbij at the end of the 8th century, making it the capital of the frontier province of al-Awasim. Afterward, the city became a point of contention between the Byzantines, Arabs and Turkic groups. The Arab chieftain Salih ibn Mirdas captured it circa 1022, making Manbij, along with Balis and al-Rahba, the foundation of his Mirdasid emirate. At the time, Manbij was one of the most important fortresses in northern Syria. In 1068, the Byzantine emperor Romanos Diogenes captured it, defeated the Mirdasids and their Bedouin allies, killed the city's inhabitants and plundered the surrounding countryside. Romanos later withdrew due to a severe shortage of food and supplies. It was later captured by Seljuk Sultan Malik-Shah I in 1086. In 1124, Belek Ghazi tried to annex Manbij, after he had imprisoned its emir Hassan al-Ba'labakki, but he was hit and killed by an arrow during the siege.

The Crusaders never captured Manbij during their 11th–12th century invasions of the Levant, but the Latin Church archbishopric of Hierapolis was re-established in the town of Duluk by 1134. By 1152, Duluk and Manbij were captured by the Zengids under Nur ad-Din, who reconstructed and strengthened the city's fortress. The Ayyubid sultan, Saladin, conquered it from its Zengid lord, Qutb ad-Din Inal, in 1175. In 1260, the Mongols under Hulagu destroyed Ayyubid Manbij, which was consequently abandoned by its Turkmen and Assyrian inhabitants as they migrated to Aleppo.

=== Modern era ===
Manbij's ruins are extensive but mostly belong to the later period of its history. Most of the monuments of Manbij are gone, because it is a strategically important place at a group of crossroads, unlike Cyrrhus whose bishop was under Manbij. Henry Maundrell who visited Mambij in 1699 noticed a rock with large busts of a male and a female with two eagles below them. Another rock had three figures sculpted in low relief. Volney who visited the place in 18th century mentioned that no remains of Atargatis' temple existed. Alexander Drummond noticed walls of a square building which he said was Atargatis' temple and also a base in the building which he identified as an altar.

Travellers in the 19th century had recorded some of its ancient remains, but now almost all of them, including Atargatis' temple, its sacred lake, colonnades, Roman baths, Roman theatres, walls and churches built by the Byzantine Empire as well as madrassas built in the medieval era, have been destroyed. The sacred lake of Atargatis has disappeared and has been converted into a football field. Only a part of the wall that enclosed the lake has survived but no ruins of Atargatis' temple remains. Some ancient Roman military stele also exist. Ruins of the southern wall that enclosed Atargatis' temple still survive. The walls of the city still exist but have been plundered.

The Ottoman government resettled the area with Circassian refugees from the Russo-Turkish War in 1878. As of 1911, its 1,500 inhabitants were all Circassians. Armenian refugees settled in Manbij during the Armenian genocide. In autumn 1915 Djemal Pasha ordered the establishment of a camp for about 1000 families of the Armenian Clergy. In January and February 1916 the sub prefect of Manbij ordered the camp to be cleared and the Armenians to be deported to Meskene. The destruction of pre-modern Manbij has been attributed to its resettlement by Circassians and Armenians.

==== Syrian civil war ====
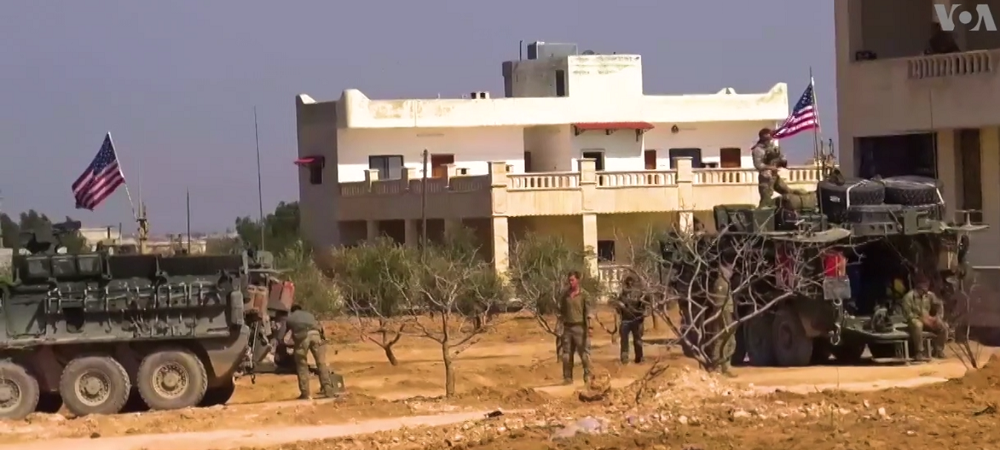
United States special operations forces near Manbij, acting as advisors to the Syrian Democratic Forces, March 2017

Before and in the early years of the Syrian civil war, Manbij had an ethnically diverse population of Arab, Kurdish, Turkmen, and Circassian Sunni Muslims, many of whom followed the Naqshbandi Sufi order. The city's socio-political life was dominated by its main tribes. Tribal leaders served as the mediators and arbiters of major disputes in Manbij, while the state's security forces largely dealt with petty offenses. The city was relatively liberal compared to other Sunni Muslim-majority cities in the countryside of Aleppo.

During the civil war, on 20 July 2012, Manbij fell to local rebel forces who thereafter administered the city. In December, there was an election to appoint a local council. In January 2014, forces from the Islamic State of Iraq and the Levant (ISIL) took over the city after ousting the rebels. The city has since become a hub for trading in looted artifacts and archaeological digging equipment. In June 2016, the Syrian Democratic Forces (SDF) launched an offensive to capture Manbij, and by 8 June had fully encircled the city. On 12 August the SDF had established full control over Manbij after a two-month battle.

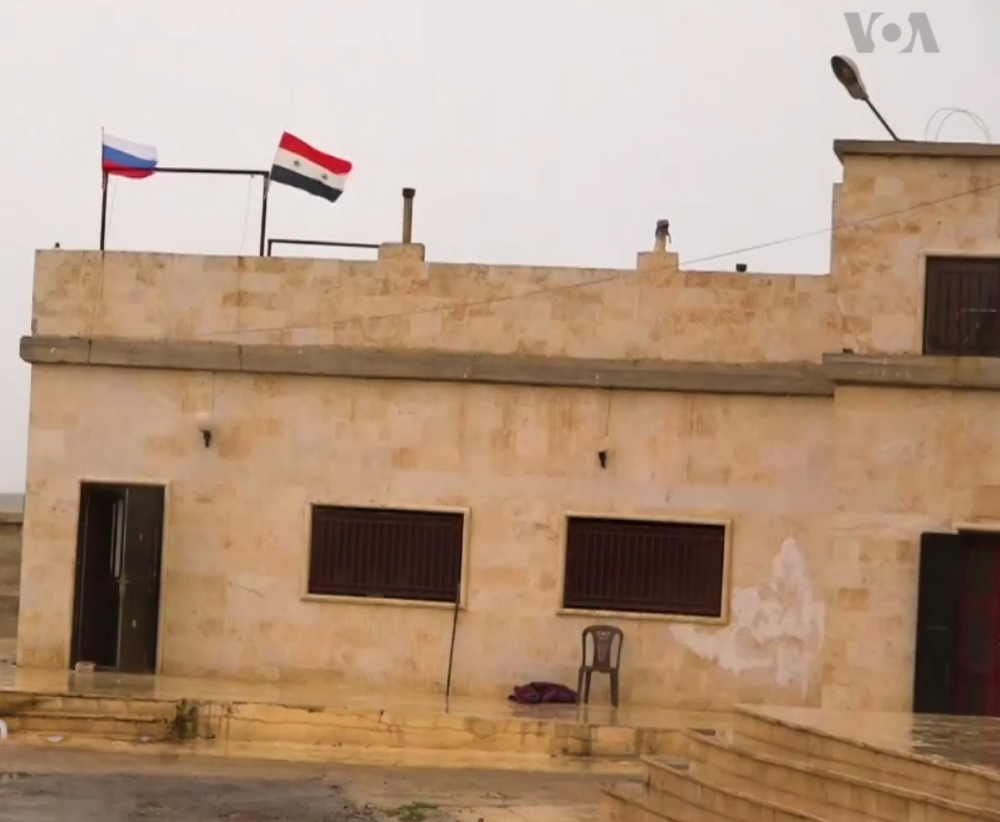
Joint Syrian-Russian base near Manbij, 2017

By 15 August, thousands of previously displaced citizens of Manbij were reported returning. On 19 August 2016, the Manbij Military Council issued a written statement announcing it had taken over the security of Manbij city center and villages from the SDF, of which it is a component.

Today Manbij is self-administered by the Manbij City Council, co-chaired by Sheikh Farouk al-Mashi and Salih Haji Mohammed, as part of Shahba region within the de facto autonomous Federation of Northern Syria – Rojava framework. While public administration including public schools has regained secular normalcy after the ISIL episode, a reconciliation committee to overcome rifts created by the civil war was formed, and international humanitarian aid has been delivered, the democratic confederalist political program of Rojava is driving political and societal transformations in terms of direct democracy and gender equality. Reconstruction after devastations of civil war combat remains a major challenge.

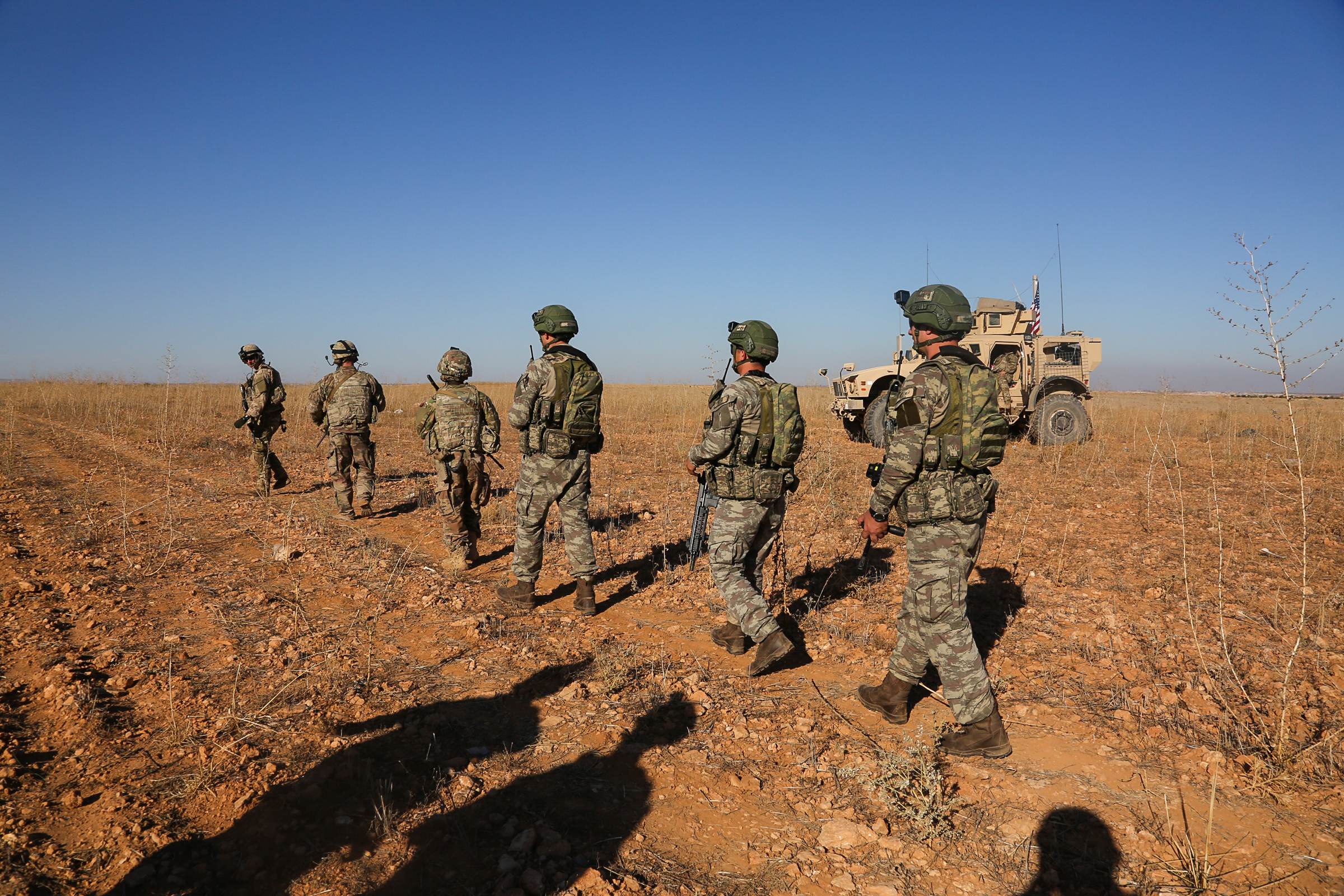
American and Turkish soldiers conduct patrols on the outskirts of Manbij, November 1, 2018

Until October 2019, when US and other Western forces withdrew from northern Syria, Manbij was also a hub for Combined Joint Task Force – Operation Inherent Resolve training of new SDF recruits in the fight against ISIL and other Islamist militias in Syria. On 26 February, the United States announced its support for the security of the Manbij Military Council. The United States also reportedly sent special forces and several military convoys to Manbij after the announcement.

On 12 March 2017, the Legislative Assembly of Manbij approved the elected co-presidents who then took office. During the meeting the departments of the committee members, co-presidents and committees were determined after speeches and evaluations. 13 committees were determined. The 13 new committees include 71 Arabs, 43 Kurds, 10 Turkmen, 8 Circassians, an Armenian and a Chechen.

On 1 November 2018, Turkish and US troops began joint patrols around Manbij along the front lines of the Euphrates Shield rebel territory and the Manbij Military Council. The joint patrols were seen as part of a "roadmap" for easing tensions between militants in the region and tensions between the two NATO allies.

On 28 December 2018, the YPG asked the Assad government via Twitter to protect Manbij from attacks by the Turkish-backed Free Syrian Army. The Syrian government's media said the Syrian army had entered Manbij, a claim that was disputed by other sources the same day. The Syrian Observatory for Human Rights reported that the Syrian Army was still outside of the town.

On 15 January 2019, a suicide attack in Manbij claimed by ISIL left at least 19 casualties. Among them, four U.S. military personnel were reported dead and three wounded. One of the dead was a U.S. Army soldier, one was U.S. Navy sailor Shannon M. Kent, one was a U.S. Department of Defense civilian working in support of the Defense Intelligence Agency, and one was an employee of Valiant Integrated Services, a contractor supporting American operations.

During the 2019 Turkish offensive into north-eastern Syria, following the withdraw of US and other Western troops from northern Syria, the Syrian Arab Army and Russian Military Police entered Manbij to preempt a Turkish and TFSA offensive.

On 6 December 2024, the Syrian National Army launched an offensive on Manbij against the Syrian Democratic Forces. On 9 December 2024, it was reported, that the SNA took control of the city. Since the takeover, Manbij has faced a sharp rise in security incidents and looting, mirroring trends in other areas under SNA control. The SOHR reported that SNA militants had looted the houses of Kurdish residents. On February 3, 2025, a VBIED detonated near the Hassin station, just outside Manbij City, killing at least 19 people. The following day, residents of the city conducted a general strike to protest the negligence of pro-Turkish factions in maintaining security and order.

== Ecclesiastical history ==
Lequien names ten bishops of Hierapolis. Among the best-known are Alexander of Hierapolis, an ardent advocate of Nestorianism, who died in exile in Egypt; Philoxenus of Mabbug, a famous Miaphysite scholar; and Stephen of Hierapolis (c. 600), author of a life of St. Golindouch. In the sixth century, the metropolitan see had nine suffragan bishoprics. Chabot mentions thirteen Jacobite archbishops from the ninth to the twelfth century. One Latin bishop, Franco, in 1136, is known.

Hierapolis in Syria is the nominal see of three Catholic successor titular sees:

- the Latin Catholic Metropolitan titular archbishopric of Hierapolis of the Romans
- the Melkite Catholic Titular Archbishopric of Hierapolis of the Melkites
- the Syrian Titular Bishopric of Hierapolis of the Syrians

== Geography ==
=== Climate ===
Manbij has a cold semi-arid climate (Köppen climate classification BSk) with influences of a continental climate during winter with hot dry summers and cool wet and occasionally snowy winters. The average high temperature in January is 7.8 °C (46.0 °F) and the average high temperature in August is 38.1 °C (100.6 °F). The snow falls usually in January, February or December.

Climate data for Manbij
Month	Jan	Feb	Mar	Apr	May	Jun	Jul	Aug	Sep	Oct	Nov	Dec	Year
Mean daily maximum °C (°F)	7.9 (46.2)	10.5 (50.9)	15.6 (60.1)	23.4 (74.1)	28.3 (82.9)	34.3 (93.7)	37.7 (99.9)	38.1 (100.6)	33.2 (91.8)	26.3 (79.3)	15.3 (59.5)	9.1 (48.4)	23.3 (73.9)
Mean daily minimum °C (°F)	−1.2 (29.8)	−0.6 (30.9)	4.3 (39.7)	7.2 (45.0)	12.5 (54.5)	15.1 (59.2)	19.9 (67.8)	20.9 (69.6)	16.3 (61.3)	12.4 (54.3)	6.4 (43.5)	−0.5 (31.1)	9.4 (48.9)
Average precipitation mm (inches)	69 (2.7)	54 (2.1)	38 (1.5)	28 (1.1)	8 (0.3)	3 (0.1)	0 (0)	0 (0)	3 (0.1)	25 (1.0)	36 (1.4)	58 (2.3)	322 (12.6)
Average rainy days	10	6	4	4	3	1	0	0	1	3	5	9	46
Average snowy days	2.5	1.5	0	0	0	0	0	0	0	0	0	2	6
Average relative humidity (%)	71	63	56	52	38	36	31	31	39	43	51	70	48
Source: Weather Online, Weather Base, BBC Weather and My Weather 2, retrieved 10 November 2012

== Transportation ==
Manbij is served by two major roads, Route M4 and Route 216.

There is no airport near Manbij, the nearest is in Aleppo.

== Notable person ==
- Empress Theodora
- Kevork Ajemian, Syrian-Armenian writer, journalist, novelist, theorist and public activist
