= Euphratensis =

Roman/Byzantine province (c. 341–7th Century)

Provincia Augusta Euphratensis ἐπαρχία Εὑφρατησίας
- Province of the Byzantine Empire
- c. 341–7th Century
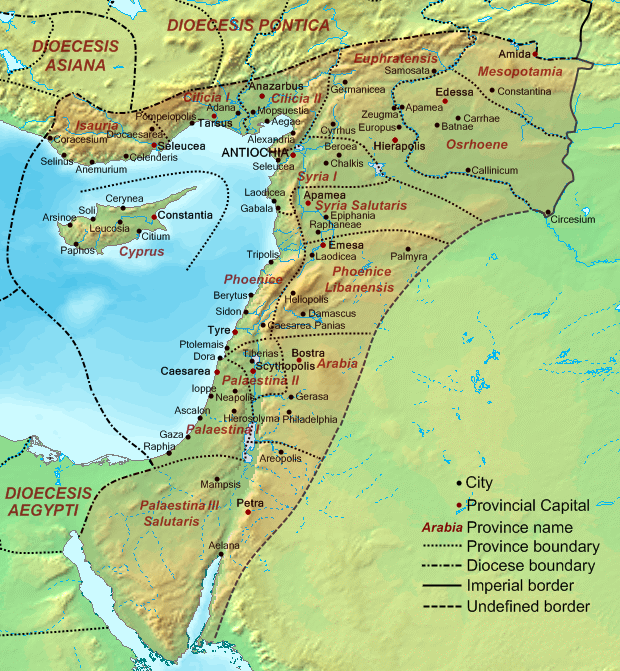
- Diocese of Orient circa 400, showing Euphratensis
- Capital: Cyrrus or Hierapolis Bambyce
- Historical era: Late Antiquity
  - Established: c. 341
  - Division of the empire by Theodosius I: 395
  - Muslim conquest of the Levant: 7th Century
Succeeded by
Rashidun Caliphate
- Today part of: Syria; Turkey

Euphratensis (Latin for "Euphratean"; Ancient Greek: Εὑφρατησία, Euphratēsía), fully Augusta Euphratensis, was a late Roman and then Byzantine province in Syrian region, part of the Byzantine Diocese of the East.

== History ==
Sometime between 330 and 350 AD (likely c. 341), the Roman province of Euphratensis was created out of the territory of Coele Syria along the western bank of the Euphrates. It included the territories of Commagene and Cyrrhestice. Its capital was Cyrrus or perhaps Hierapolis Bambyce. It remained within the Byzantine Empire following the 395 division of the empire by Theodosius I.

The province is listed in the Laterculus Veronensis from around 314.

The Roman Catholic and Orthodox saints Sergius and Bacchus were supposedly martyred in the city of Resafa in Euphratensis, and the city was later renamed Sergiopolis. Other cities in the province were Samosata and Zeugma.
