= Manbij (People's Assembly electoral district) =

Electoral district of Syria's national legislature

- Electoral district for the People's Assembly
- Location of Manbij within Syria
- District: Manbij
- Governorate: Aleppo
- Population: 408,143 (2004)
- Electorate: 150
- Area: 5,183.99 km^{2}

Current Electoral district
- Created: 2025
- Seats: 3 (2025–present)
- MPAs: List: ▌Ahmad al-Ta'aan (Ind.); ▌Ibrahim at-Talib (Ind.); ▌Mustafa Haj Abdullah (Ind.)
- Created from: Districts of Aleppo Governorate

Manbij (Arabic: منبج) is one of the 60 electoral districts of the People's Assembly, the national legislature of Syria. It is conterminous with the district of Manbij. The electoral district currently elects three of the 140 elected members of the People's Assembly.

== Electoral system ==
The 2025 elections were held under a provisional electoral system, enacted by Presidential Decree 142 on 20 August 2025. The new framework replaces direct elections, with an indirect system. Instead of direct votes, subcommittees will choose delegates that form one electoral college per electoral district, which in turn will choose MPs. The number of members on each governorate's sub-committee matches the number of MPs the governorate will elect.

== Members of the People's Assembly ==
Elections	MPA (Party)	MPA (Party)	MPA (Party)
2025	Ahmad al-Ta'aan (Independent)	Ibrahim at-Talib (Independent)	Mustafa Haj Abdullah (Independent)
