= Walia, Syria =

Walia والية
- Village
- Location of Walia in Syria
- Coordinates: 36°29′11″N 38°5′56″E
- Country: Syria
- Governorate: Aleppo
- District: Manbij
- Subdistrict: Abu Qalqil

Population (2004)
  - Total: 1,046
- Time zone: UTC+2 (EET)
  - Summer (DST): UTC+3 (EEST)
- Geocode: C1827

Walia or Walieh (Arabic: والية, also spelled Waliah) is a village in northern Syria, administratively part of the Aleppo Governorate, located northeast of Aleppo. Nearby localities include Manbij to the northwest. In the 2004 census, it had a population of 1046.
