= Hamir Labidah =

Hamir Labidah حيمر لابدة
- Village
- Location of Hamir Labidah in Syria
- Coordinates: 36°23′20″N 37°58′36″E
- Country: Syria
- Governorate: Aleppo
- District: Manbij
- Subdistrict: Abu Qilqil

Population (2004)
  - Total: 3,681
- Time zone: UTC+2 (EET)
  - Summer (DST): UTC+3 (EEST)

Hamir Labidah (Arabic: حيمر لابدة), also spelled Haymar Labidah, Haymar Labdah or Himar Labda, is a village located 15 kilometers (9.3 mi) south of Manbij in northern Syria. In the 2004 census, it had a population of 3681.

In July 2016, the village was under control of ISIL. It was captured by SDF on 20 August 2016.
