= Arab Hassan Kabir =

Arab Hassan Kabir عرب حسن كبير
- Village
- Location of Arab Hassan Kabir in Syria
- Coordinates: 36°38′00″N 37°50′55″E
- Country: Syria
- Governorate: Aleppo
- District: Manbij
- Subdistrict: Manbij

Population (2004)
  - Total: 2,763
- Time zone: UTC+2 (EET)
  - Summer (DST): UTC+3 (EEST)
- Geocode: C1683

Arab Hassan Kabir (Arabic: عرب حسن كبير, also spelled 'Arab Hasan Kebir) is a village in northern Syria, administratively part of the Aleppo Governorate, located northeast of Aleppo. Nearby localities include Manbij to the southeast and Arab Hassan Saghir to the north. In the 2004 census, it had a population of 2,763.
