= Zunqul =

Zunqul زونقل
- Village
- Location of Zunqul in Syria
- Coordinates: 36°36′30″N 37°50′01″E
- Country: Syria
- Governorate: Aleppo
- District: Manbij
- Subdistrict: Manbij

Population (2004)
  - Total: 1,966
- Time zone: UTC+2 (EET)
  - Summer (DST): UTC+3 (EEST)
- Geocode: C1719

Zunqul (Arabic: زونقل), also spelled Zūnqal, Zounqul or Zornaqal, is a village located 14 kilometers (8.7 mi) northwest of Manbij in northern Syria. In the 2004 census, it had a population of 1,966.
