= Jubb Hamza =

Jubb Hamza جب حمزة
- Village
- Location of Jubb Hamza in Syria
- Coordinates: 36°23′22″N 37°56′34″E
- Country: Syria
- Governorate: Aleppo
- District: Manbij
- Subdistrict: Abu Qilqil

Population (2004)
  - Total: 2,089
- Time zone: UTC+2 (EET)
  - Summer (DST): UTC+3 (EEST)

Jubb Hamza (Arabic: جب حمزة), also spelled Jeb Hamza or Dżubb Hamza, it is a village situated 12 kilometers (7.5 mi) to the south of Manbij in northern Syria. In the 2004 census, it had a population of 2089.
