= Dandaniya =

Dandaniya دندنية
- Village
- Location of Dandaniya in Syria
- Coordinates: 36°34′36″N 37°45′44″E
- Country: Syria
- Governorate: Aleppo
- District: Manbij
- Subdistrict: Manbij

Population (2004)
  - Total: 683
- Time zone: UTC+2 (EET)
  - Summer (DST): UTC+3 (EEST)
- Geocode: C1688

Dandaniya (Arabic: دندنية; Turkish: Dendeloğlu or Dendenoğlu), also spelled Dandaniyah, Dendeniyê or Dandānīyah, is a village located 18 kilometers (11 mi) west-north-west of Manbij in northern Syria. In the 2004 census, it had a population of 683. The village is inhabited by Turkmen.

== Syrian civil war ==
On 25 August 2016, the village was reportedly attacked with chemical weapons.
