= Hayyah Kabirah =

Hayyah Kabirah حية كبيرة
- Village
- Location in Syria
- Coordinates: 36°33′55″N 38°7′59″E
- Country: Syria
- Governorate: Aleppo
- District: Manbij
- Subdistrict: Manbij

Population (2004)
  - Total: 2,622
- Time zone: UTC+2 (EET)
  - Summer (DST): UTC+3 (EEST)

Hayyah Kabirah (Arabic: حية كبيرة, romanized: Hāyyāh Kābīrāh) is a village in northern Syria, administratively part of the Aleppo Governorate, located northeast of Aleppo and south of the Euphrates River. Nearby localities include district center Manbij to the west and Abu Qilqil to the south. According to the Syria Central Bureau of Statistics (CBS) it had a population of 2,622 in the 2004 census. The village is inhabited by Turkmen.

After falling into the hands of ISIS during the Syrian Civil War, the village was captured by the Syrian Democratic Forces on 6 June 2016 as part of operations led by the Manbij Military Council. While security is still provided by the Manbij Military Council, a local Council was formed on 27 September to govern and manage public services; Health services; Magistrates services and Child, Youth & Family services. It has a number of counsellors, as well as two chief executives and three deputy executives.
