= Tishrin, Aleppo =

Tishrin تشرين
- Town
- Location of Tishrin in Syria
- Coordinates: 36°23′02″N 38°09′51″E
- Country: Syria
- Governorate: Aleppo
- District: Manbij
- Subdistrict: Abu Qilqil
- Time zone: UTC+3 (AST)

Tishrin (Arabic: تشرين, romanized: Tišrīn) is a Syrian town, located just west of Tishrin Dam, in the Aleppo Governorate, Syria.
