= Egyptian Natural Gas Company =

Egyptian gas company

Egyptian Natural Gas Company (GASCO)
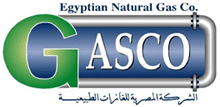
- Company type: Government-owned
- Industry: Oil and gas
- Founded: 1997
- Founder: Egyptian Natural Gas Holding Company(EGAS)
- Headquarters: New Cairo, Egypt
- Number of locations: Egypt, Jordan, Lebanon
- Products: Natural gas Propane; LPG; Gas condensates
- Services: Natural gas transmission Pipeline services
- Revenue: E£6 billion
- Net income: E£1.8 billion
- Owner: Egyptian Natural Gas Holding Company (79%); Petrojet (15%); Egypt Gas (15%)
- Number of employees: 4500+
- Parent: Egyptian Natural Gas Holding Company
- Website: www.gasco.com.eg

Egyptian Natural Gas Company (GASCO) is a subsidiary of the Egyptian Natural Gas Holding Company, operating in the field of natural gas transmission, distribution and processing. The company was established in March 1997. GASCO operates the gas grid with total length of 22,000 kilometres (14,000 mi). The national gas grid has extended to neighboring countries through the Arab Gas Pipeline.

== Ownership ==
The main shareholder is the Egyptian Holding Company for Natural Gas with 70% of shares. Petrojet and Egypt Gas own 15% of shares both.

== See also ==
- Energy in Egypt
