= Oweishiyeh =

- Location of Oweishiyeh in Syria
- Coordinates: 36°18′24.34″N 37°35′36.72″E
- Country: Syria
- Governorate: Aleppo
- District: al-Bab
- Subdistrict: Tedef

Population (2004)
  - Total: 2,218
- Time zone: UTC+2 (EET)
  - Summer (DST): UTC+3 (EEST)

Oweishiyeh or Uwaishiyah is a village in al-Bab District in northern Aleppo Governorate, northwestern Syria.

== Syrian Civil War ==
On 5 February 2017, the Syrian Army captured the village from Islamic State of Iraq and the Levant.
