= Abu Jabbar =

- Location of Abu Jabbar in Syria
- Coordinates: 36°20′N 37°38′E
- Country: Syria
- Governorate: Aleppo
- District: al-Bab
- Subdistrict: Tedef

Population (2004)
  - Total: 2,821
- Time zone: UTC+2 (EET)
  - Summer (DST): UTC+3 (EEST)

Abu Jabbar is a village in al-Bab District in northern Aleppo Governorate, northwestern Syria.
