= Abu Taltal =

- Location of Abu Taltal in Syria
- Coordinates: 36°20′09.04″N 37°31′22.11″E
- Country: Syria
- Governorate: Aleppo
- District: al-Bab
- Subdistrict: Tedef

Population (2004)
  - Total: 5,000+
- Time zone: UTC+2 (EET)
  - Summer (DST): UTC+3 (EEST)

Abu Taltal is a village in al-Bab District in northern Aleppo Governorate, northwestern Syria.
