= Maskanah =

Maskanah مسكنة
- Town
- Location within Syria
- Coordinates: 35.963158°N 38.035566°E
- Country: Syria
- Governorate: Aleppo
- District: Manbij
- Subdistrict: Maskanah

Population (2004 census)
  - Total: 15,477
- Time zone: UTC+3 (AST)

Maskanah (Arabic: مَسْكَنَة), also spelled Meskene, is a town in northern Syria, administratively part of the Manbij District of the Aleppo Governorate. The town is located 100 kilometres (62 mi) southeast of Aleppo on the Lake Assad part of the Euphrates. Nearby localities include Dayr Hafir, Humaymah Kabirah and Tell Ayoub to the northwest and Tabqa to the southeast. According to the Syria Central Bureau of Statistics (CBS), Maskanah had a population of 15,477 in the 2004 census.

== History ==
The Bronze Age city of Emar lies a few kilometres north of the present town.

In 1210, during Ayyubid rule, the al-Adil Minaret was constructed. The brick structure was built in the simple, Persian architectural style. It was further developed during the Mamluk period. It was restored during Hafez al-Assad's rule (1970–2000) and is one last historic architectural remains in the town.

During Ottoman rule, the area was mostly inhabited by nomadic Bedouin tribes. In 1838, Maskanah was classified as a ruined village ("khirba") by Biblical scholar Eli Smith. In 1915 the town was visited by orientalist Alois Musil who mentions the town having barracks, a large khan, and the residence of the head of the telegraph service. A year later, Maskanah became a major deportation route during the Armenian genocide where an estimated 80,000 Armenians died.

Under the French mandate, the town was the center of a qadaa, and served as a center for milk production and cattle merchants. In 1945 the village had 430 inhabitants.

Maskanah is the administrative center of Nahiya Maskanah of the Manbij District.

On 3 June 2017, the city was captured by the Syrian Army from the Islamic State. The SDF took control of the town on 1 December 2024 following the withdrawal of the Syrian Army. They later withdrew east of the Euphrates on 17 January 2026 under pressure from advancing Syrian transitional government forces during the northeastern Syria offensive.
