= East Aleppo offensive =

East Aleppo offensive may refer to:

- East Aleppo offensive (2015–2016)
- East Aleppo offensive (February–April 2017)
- East Aleppo offensive (May 2017)
- East Aleppo offensive (2024–present)
