= Petrojet =

Egyptian oil and gas company

Petrojet (The Petroleum Projects & Technical Consultations Co)
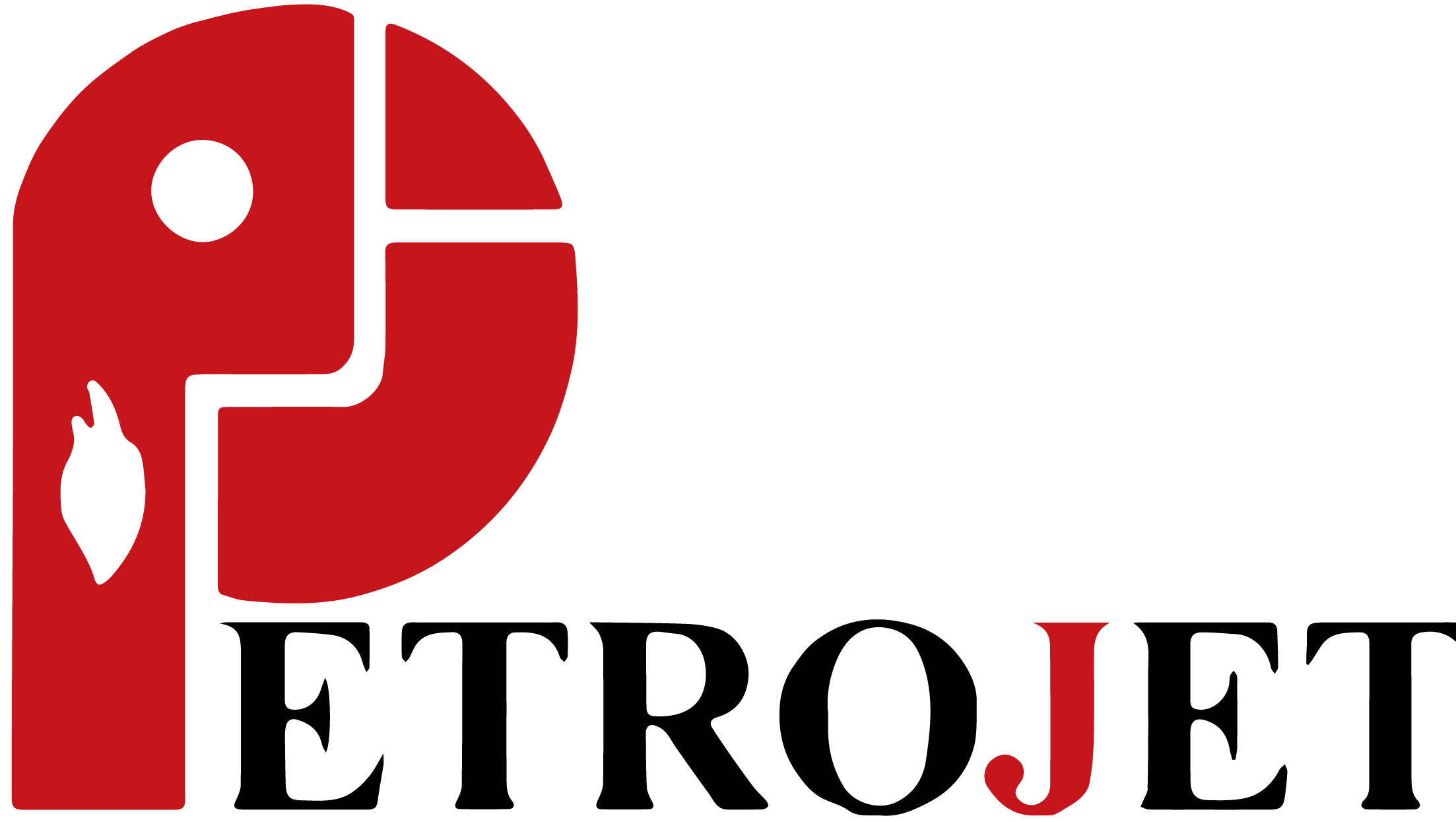
- Type: Government-owned
- Industry: Oil and gas
- Founded: 1975
- Founder: Egyptian General Petroleum Corporation(EGPC)
- Headquarters: New Cairo, Egypt
- Number of locations: Egypt
- Services: Petroleum Projects & Technical Consultations
- Number of employees: 35000+
- Parent: Egyptian General Petroleum Corporation
- Website: petrojet.com.eg

Petrojet (The Petroleum Projects & Technical Consultations Co.) (Arabic: بتروجت) is a subsidiary of the Egyptian General Petroleum Corporation, is a company in the Egyptian petroleum sector, established in 1975 as an Egyptian joint stock company.

With its practical experience, human resources, and equipment, Petrojet is one of the largest contracting companies in the Middle East and Africa. Its activities have expanded to include the implementation of mega projects in Saudi Arabia, Qatar, Oman, Yemen, Jordan, Lebanon, Sudan, Libya, Algeria, the United Arab Emirates, Kuwait, Iraq, and Mozambique. This has placed it among the world's top 250 contracting companies for ten consecutive years.

In Egypt, the company maintains its steady progress in building a broad base of accumulated resources and expertise in various strategic fields. This is achieved by adopting a new policy that embraces the implementation of the Egyptian petroleum sector's vision aimed at achieving sustainable development for the sector in particular, in line with the Egyptian state's vision for achieving sustainable development 2030 in general.

Petrojet’s vision focuses on expanding both locally and internationally. This was discussed by Eng. Karim Badawy, Minister of Petroleum and Mineral Resources, who emphasized the vital role of Petrojet in executing national projects and continuing its expansion into regional and global markets.

The company operates according to a strategy and priority that aims to participate in the implementation of national projects for the Egyptian petroleum sector in a manner that contributes to the implementation of the vision and direction of the Egyptian Ministry of Petroleum.

Engineering News Record (ENR) has ranked Petrojet in the 130 rank in the 2021 Top 250 International Contractors. Petrojet ascended 8 steps comparing to the 2020 rank Also, Petrojet ranked 140 in the Top 250 Global Contractors surpassing 31 ranks comparing to 2020 ranking.

== See also ==
- Energy in Egypt
