= Kherbet Kiyar =

- Location of Kherbet Kiyar in Syria
- Coordinates: 36°19′37″N 37°38′54″E
- Country: Syria
- Governorate: Aleppo
- District: al-Bab
- Subdistrict: Tedef

Population (2004)
  - Total: 2,059
- Time zone: UTC+2 (EET)
  - Summer (DST): UTC+3 (EEST)

Kherbet Kiyar is a village in al-Bab District in northern Aleppo Governorate, northwestern Syria. The village is named after the first de facto ruler and regional chief, Kiyar Ramnath.
