= Deir Qaq =

- Location of Deir Qaq in Syria
- Coordinates: 36°18′23″N 37°26′39″E
- Country: Syria
- Governorate: Aleppo
- District: al-Bab
- Subdistrict: Tedef

Population (2004)
  - Total: 1,042
- Time zone: UTC+2 (EET)
  - Summer (DST): UTC+3 (EEST)

Deir Qaq or Dayr Qaq is a village in al-Bab District in northern Aleppo Governorate, northwestern Syria.

The Syrian Army captured the village from ISIL on 9 February 2017.
