= Belayim oil field =

Egyptian oilfield in the Gulf of Suez

Coordinates: 30.0472°N 31.2445°E

Belayim
- Country: Egypt
- Region: Gulf of Suez
- Offshore/onshore: offshore
- Operator: Eni

Field history
- Discovery: 1961
- Start of production: 1962

Production
- Estimated oil in place: 373 million tonnes (~ 442×10^{6} m^{3} or 2780 million bbl)

The Belayim oil field is an oil field located in the Gulf of Suez. It was discovered in 1961 and developed by Eni. It began production in 1962 and produces oil and natural gas. The total proven reserves of the Belayim oil field are around 2.78 billion barrels (373 million tonnes), and production is centered on 75,000 barrels per day (11,900 m^{3}/d).

== Geology ==
There have been many studies done on the Suez Gulf for the purpose of evaluating the source rock within the area. Younis concluded that the Black of the Nubia-B reservoir is considered to be a mature potential source rock within the area.

Overall, the main source rocks are located in the Pre Miocene succession as they are represented by fine grained clastics and carbonates rocks belonging to the Nubia-B formation from the Carboniferous period, brown limestone of the Dawi Formation from the Late Cretaceous epoch, Esna shale formation from the Paleocene and the Thebes carbonate formation from the Eocene epoch. Thebes and the Dawi formations are the main source rocks and have an average of 0.5-2% TOC, with mainly oil-prone type 2 kerosene.

== See also ==
- Energy in Egypt
