= Ahmad al-Ta'aan =

Syrian Islamic scholar and politician (born 1973)

- أحمد الطعان

Member of the People's Assembly
- Incumbent
- Assumed office 5 October 2025
- Constituency: Manbij

Personal details
- Born: Ahmad Idris al-Ta'aan; 1973 (age 52–53) Manbij, Syria
- Party: Independent
- Other political affiliations: Ahrar al-Sham (2013–2014)
- Education: Damascus University (BA); Cairo University (PhD)

Ahmad Idris al-Ta'aan (Arabic: أحمد إدريس الطعان; born 1973) is a Syrian Islamic scholar, academic, former rebel commander and politician who has served as a member of the People's Assembly for the constituency of Manbij since October 2025. Prior to entering parliament, he was a founder of the al-Adiyat Battalion in Manbij during the Syrian civil war, served as president of al-Sham International University, and held senior positions within the Syrian Islamic Council.

== Biography ==
Al-Ta'aan was born in the village of Jubb al-Kajli in the Manbij region of Aleppo Governorate in 1973. He obtained a degree in Sharia from Damascus University, followed by a master's degree and doctorate in Islamic philosophy from Cairo University. Between 2004 and 2011, he taught at the Faculty of Sharia of the Damascus University.

Following the outbreak of the Syrian revolution in 2011, al-Ta'aan participated in the anti-government protest movement and was arrested twice by the Syrian authorities because of his involvement in peaceful political activism. Following his release, he participated in the establishment of the Syrian National Current on 10 December 2011. During this period, he spent time in Jordan and Turkey before returning to northern Syria following the expansion of opposition control in Aleppo Governorate during 2012.

After returning to Syria, al-Ta'aan became involved in the armed opposition. On 8 August 2012, he founded the al-Adiyat Battalion in Manbij and served as its commander. The battalion later joined the Victory Banners Brigade (Liwa Rayat al-Nasr) in December 2012, which itself became part of the Ahrar al-Sham Islamic Movement in August 2013. Following the capture of Manbij by the Islamic State in early 2014, al-Ta'aan left the city and relocated to opposition-held northern Aleppo countryside.

From 2014 onward, al-Ta'aan concentrated primarily on academic and educational work. He founded the Ibn Khaldun International University in Manbij, although the institution ceased operating after the city fell under the control of the Islamic State. He later helped establish al-Sham International University in 2015 and served as its president between 2015 and 2018. During the same period, he headed the Higher Education Authority in opposition-held areas of northern Syria.

Between 2021 and 2025, he served as dean of the Faculty of Sharia at the University of Aleppo in the liberated areas. He also taught at the Başakşehir Academy in Turkey, founded by the Syrian scholar Imad al-Din Rashid. Additionally, he served as chairman of the Scientific Committee of the Syrian Islamic Council from 2021 to 2025, having previously been a member of its board of trustees. Following the fall of the Assad regime in December 2024, al-Ta'aan stood as a candidate in the 2025 parliamentary election for the constituency of Manbij.
