= Mustafa Haj Abdullah =

Syrian Islamic scholar and politician (born 1973)

- مصطفى عمر حاج عبدالله

Member of the People's Assembly
- Incumbent
- Assumed office 5 October 2025
- Constituency: Manbij

Personal details
- Born: Mustafa Haj Abdullah; 1978 (age 47–48) Manbij, Syria
- Party: Independent

Mustafa Haj Abdullah (Arabic: مصطفى عمر حاج عبدالله; born 1978) is a Syrian politician who has served as a member of the People's Assembly for the constituency of Manbij since October 2025.

== Biography ==
Haj Abdullah was born in Manbij (Aleppo Governorate) in 1978. A legal expert and lawyer. Member of the Free Lawyers Syndicate in Aleppo and chairman of the Board of Trustees of the Revolution in Manbij and its countryside.
