= Abu Kahf Subdistrict =

Abu Kahf Subdistrict ناحية أبو كهف
- Subdistrict
- Country: Syria
- Governorate: Aleppo
- District: Manbij
- Seat: Manbij

Population (2004)
  - Total: 19,964

Abu Kahf Subdistrict (Arabic: ناحية أبو كهف) is a subdistrict of Manbij District in Aleppo Governorate of northern Syria. Administrative centre is the village Abu Kahf.

The subdistrict was formed in 2009, when the southern part of Manbij Subdistrict was split apart. At the 2004 census, the villages of the subdistrict had a total population of 19,964.

== Cities, towns and villages ==
Cities, towns and villages of Abu Kahf Subdistrict
Code	Name	Population
C1725	Himar Jis	1,628
C1745	Janat Abu Jadha Jarkas	1,457
C1690	Jeb Makhzum	1,378
C1692	Biret Manbaj	1,170
C1703	Jeb Elkhafi - Manbaj	1,159
C1792	Big Maqtaa Elhajar	1,066
C1788	Moruh Manbaj	963
C1728	Halisiyeh	751
C1732	Little Arbaa	711
C1760	Tayha	680
#N/A	#N/A	642
C1694	Tal Abu Jadha - Tayara	598
C1757	Abu Kahf	597
C1776	Nahliya - Nahliya	586
C1759	Big Abu Jadha	580
C1740	Abu Mandil	578
C1770	Mostarihet Jafatlak	557
C1787	Maqtala	535
C1771	Qatmet Manbaj - Qatma	497
C1766	Manther Eljarf	496
C1698	Um Khorzet Manbaj	443
C1751	Abu Tawil	395
C1786	Labda - Milo Yran	351
C1778	Muqbilet Elbireh	350
C1794	Little Maqtaa Elhajar	302
C1695	Jeb Elhamam Sultan	297
C1693	Amudiyeh	286
C1686	Toq Elkhalil	283
C1736	Um Myal Miri	256
C1705	Tlilet Manbaj	228
#N/A	#N/A	144
