= Ibrahim at-Talib =

Syrian Islamic scholar and politician (born 1973)

- إبراهيم الطالب

Member of the People's Assembly
- Incumbent
- Assumed office 5 October 2025
- Constituency: Manbij

Personal details
- Born: Ibrahim at-Talib; 1977 (age 48–49) Tal Hawdhan, Syria
- Party: Independent

Ibrahim Khalil at-Talib (Arabic: إبراهيم خليل الطالب; born 1977) is a Syrian politician and journalist who has served as a member of the People's Assembly for the constituency of Manbij since October 2025.

== Early life ==
Ibrahim Khalil al-Taleb was born in Tal Hawdhan (Aleppo Governorate) in 1977. He worked in journalism and media at Al Jazeera Press, Printing, and Publishing Foundation between 2003 and 2011.
