= Petroleum Air Services =

Egyptian airline

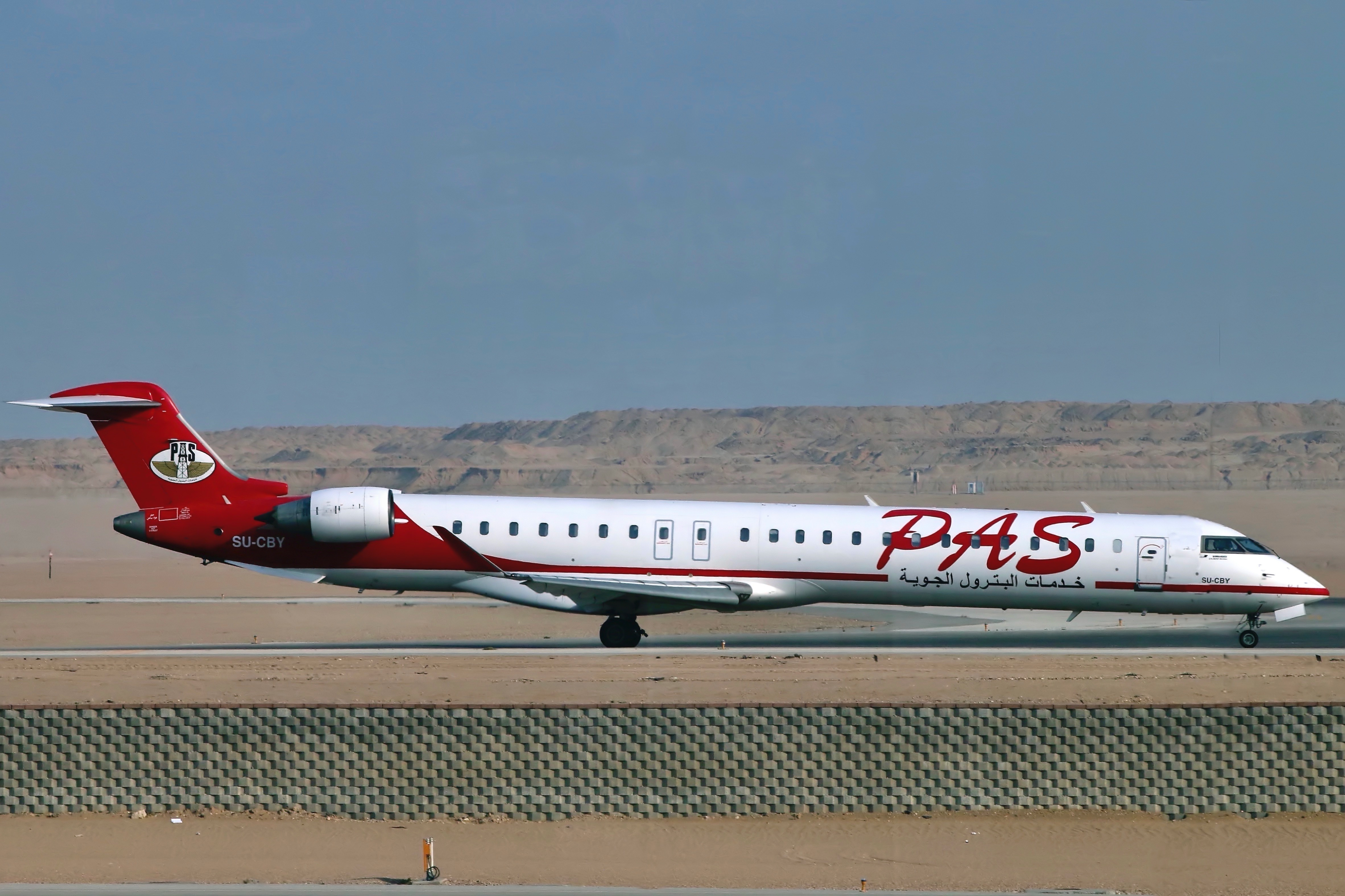
- Petroleum Air Services (PAS) Bombardier CRJ-900ER
IATA	ICAO	Call sign
UF	PER	PAS AIR
- Founded: 1982
- Focus cities: Alexandria, Port Said, Ras Gharib, Ras Shukeir, Abu Rudeis
- Fleet size: 8 fixed-wing aircraft 37 helicopters
- Destinations: Alexandria, Port Said, Ras Gharib, Luxor, Ras Shukeir, Abu Rudeis, El Tor, Marsa Matrouh
- Headquarters: Cairo, Egypt
- Key people: Ehab abdelmaksoud (Chairman & MD)
- Website: www.pas.com.eg

Petroleum Air Services (PAS) (Arabic: خدمات البترول الجوية Khidmāt al-Bitrūl al-Gawwīyyah) is an airline based in Cairo, Egypt. It operates helicopter services to support the oil industry. The airline also operates commercial passenger services within Egypt and the regional cities. Its main base is Cairo International Airport.

== History ==
The airline was established and started operations in 1982. It is owned by Egyptian General Petroleum Corporation (75%) and Bristow Group Inc. (25%).

The airline's headquarters is in Nasr City, Doctor Batrawy Street; it moved operations there in 1990.

During the 2011 Dubai Airshow, the airline signed an order with Bombardier for their first jet aircraft, the Bombardier CRJ900. The aircraft will be delivered in 2012.

In 2016 Petroleum Air Services becomes an Authorized Customer Service Facility for Bell Helicopter.

== Operations ==
=== Main Operations ===
PAS's main operations focus on serving the petroleum industry in Egypt. All petroleum operations are conducted and flown by the Bell-212, Bell-412, Bell-206, Eurocopter-135 and AgustaWestland AW139helicopters.

The main bases/cities of operations are:

Alexandria – Port Said – Sidi Kerir – Abu Rudeis – Ras Gharib – Ras Shukeir

=== Charter Flights ===
PAS Air provides charter flights to all domestic destinations inside Egypt plus other international destinations within the region

=== VIP Flights ===
PAS Air operates the Bombardier DHC-8 and CRJ-900 airplanes, regional category Aircraft. PAS offer also Helicopter VIP flight to domestic destinations.

=== Airline Feeder Services ===
PAS is capable of providing Tour Operators, Aerial Photography, Petroleum Industry Flights, and short flights to connect with other scheduled airline flights through PAS's fleet of Airplanes and Helicopters.

== Fleet ==
=== Current fleet ===
As of July 2026, the Petroleum Air Services fleet consists of the following (fixed-wing) aircraft:

Petroleum Air Services fixed-wing aircraft fleet
Aircraft	Total	Orders	Passengers	Notes
Bombardier Dash 8-Q300	5	—	50	
Bombardier CRJ900ER	2	—	90	
Bombardier CRJ900LR	1	—	90	
Total	8	—		

Petroleum Air Services helicopter fleet
Aircraft	In Service	Orders	Passengers (Economy)
Bell 212	10	0	12
Bell 412 HP/EP	15	0	12
Bell 206 L3 (Long Ranger)	6	0	5
Bell 206 B3 (Jet Ranger)	2	0	3
Eurocopter EC135 P2+	3	0	6
AgustaWestland AW139	7	0	12 & 15
Total	43	0	

=== Former fleet ===
As of August 2025, the Petroleum Air Services operated the following (fixed-wing) aircraft: 5 De Havilland Canada DHC-8-300 and 3 CRJ900.
