= Barlahin =

- Location of Barlahin in Syria
- Coordinates: 36°15′13.7″N 37°24′2.6″E
- Country: Syria
- Governorate: Aleppo
- District: al-Bab
- Subdistrict: Tedef

Population (2004)
  - Total: 2,367
- Time zone: UTC+2 (EET)
  - Summer (DST): UTC+3 (EEST)

Barlahin or Berlehine is a village in al-Bab District in northern Aleppo Governorate, northwestern Syria.
