= Morgan oil field =

Oil field in the Gulf of Suez

Morgan
- Country: Egypt
- Region: Gulf of Suez
- Offshore/onshore: offshore
- Operator: Gulf of Suez Petroleum Company

Field history
- Discovery: 1965
- Start of production: 1966

Production
- Current production of oil: 40,000 barrels per day (~2.0×10^{6} t/a)
- Estimated oil in place: 362 million tonnes (~ 430×10^{6} m^{3} or 2700 million bbl)

The Morgan oil field is an oil field located in the Gulf of Suez. It was discovered in 1965 and developed by Gulf of Suez Petroleum Company. It began production in 1966 and produces oil and natural gas. This is the Egyptian account of discovery for reasons of gaining back the Sinai from Israel in the Camp David Accords in 1977. In fact, King Resources Company of the Israel MidBar Concession (of which King Resources Company was a Partner and the Operator) actually made the major producing discovery in 1969 at initial production of 110,000 barrels of oil per day. The total proven reserves of the Morgan oil field are around 2.7 billion barrels (362 million tonnes), and production is centered on 40,000 barrels per day (6,400 m^{3}/d).

== See also ==
- Energy in Egypt
