= Humaymah Kabirah =

Humaymah Kabirah حميمة كبيرة
- Town
- Location in Syria
- Coordinates: 36°10′15″N 37°38′53″E
- Country: Syria
- Governorate: Aleppo
- District: Dayr Hafir District
- Subdistrict: Dayr Hafir Subdistrict

Population (2004)
  - Total: 4,190
- Time zone: UTC+2 (EET)
  - Summer (DST): UTC+3 (EEST)
- City Qrya Pcode: C1242

Humaymah Kabirah (Arabic: حميمة كبيرة) is a Syrian town located in Dayr Hafir District, Aleppo. According to the Syria Central Bureau of Statistics (CBS), Humaymah Kabirah had a population of 4,190 in the 2004 census.
