= Al-Khafsah Subdistrict =

Al-Khafsah Subdistrict ناحية الخفسة
- Subdistrict
- Location of Al-Khafsah Subdistrict within Aleppo Governorate

- Location in Syria
- Coordinates (Al-Khafsah): 35.8044°N 37.9389°E
- Country: Syria
- Governorate: Aleppo
- District: Manbij
- Seat: Al-Khafsah

Population (2004)
  - Total: 92,368
- Geocode: SY020502

Al-Khafsah Subdistrict (Arabic: ناحية الخفسة) is a subdistrict of Manbij District in Aleppo Governorate of northern Syria. The administrative centre is the town of Al-Khafsah.

At the 2004 census, the subdistrict had a population of 92,368.
