= Maskanah Subdistrict =

Maskanah Subdistrict ناحية مسكنة
- Subdistrict
- Location of Maskanah Subdistrict within Aleppo Governorate

- Location in Syria
- Country: Syria
- Governorate: Aleppo
- District: Manbij
- Seat: Maskanah

Population (2004)
  - Total: 64,829
- Geocode: SY020503

Maskanah Subdistrict (Arabic: ناحية مسكنة) is a subdistrict of Manbij District in Aleppo Governorate of northern Syria. The administrative centre is the town of Maskanah.

At the 2004 census, the subdistrict had a population of 64,829.
