= Egyptian Natural Gas Holding Company =

Egyptian gas company

Egyptian Natural Gas Holding Company (EGAS)
- Company type: Government-owned corporation
- Industry: Oil and gas
- Founded: 2001; 25 years ago
- Headquarters: Nasr City, Cairo, Egypt
- Key people: Yasseen Mohamed Ahmed (Executive Managing Director)
- Owner: Egyptian General Petroleum Corporation (EGPC)
- Website: www.egas.com.eg

The Egyptian Natural Gas Holding Company (EGAS) is an Egyptian state-owned holding company, which owns and manages state stakes in different gas project. The company was established in August 2001. EGAS is also responsible for issuing of natural gas exploration licenses in Egypt.

== Operations ==
In 2014/2015, EGAS signed six agreements, of them three offshore areas in Mediterranean Sea and three onshore areas in Nile Delta. In February 2015, a bidding for twelve offshore blocks in Mediterranean Sea was announced.

In 2014/2015, gas production reached about 1.65 trillion cubic feet per annum (47 billion cubic metres per annum) and total local consumption of natural gas reached 1.66 trillion cubic feet per annum (47 billion cubic metres per annum). Gas import started in April 2015, supplying to the national gas grid after the regasification with quantity of 30 billion cubic feet (850 million cubic metres). In 2012/2013, total net gas production in Egypt reached 2.26 trillion cubic feet per annum (64 billion cubic metres per annum).

== Corporate affairs ==
In March 2017 Egyptian Oil Minister Tarek al-Molla replaced the Chairman of EGAS Osama Wafik El-Bakly, by Dr Magdy Galal.

== See also ==
- Energy in Egypt
