= Ras Ghareb =

City in Red Sea Governate, Egypt

Ra's Ghareb راس غارب
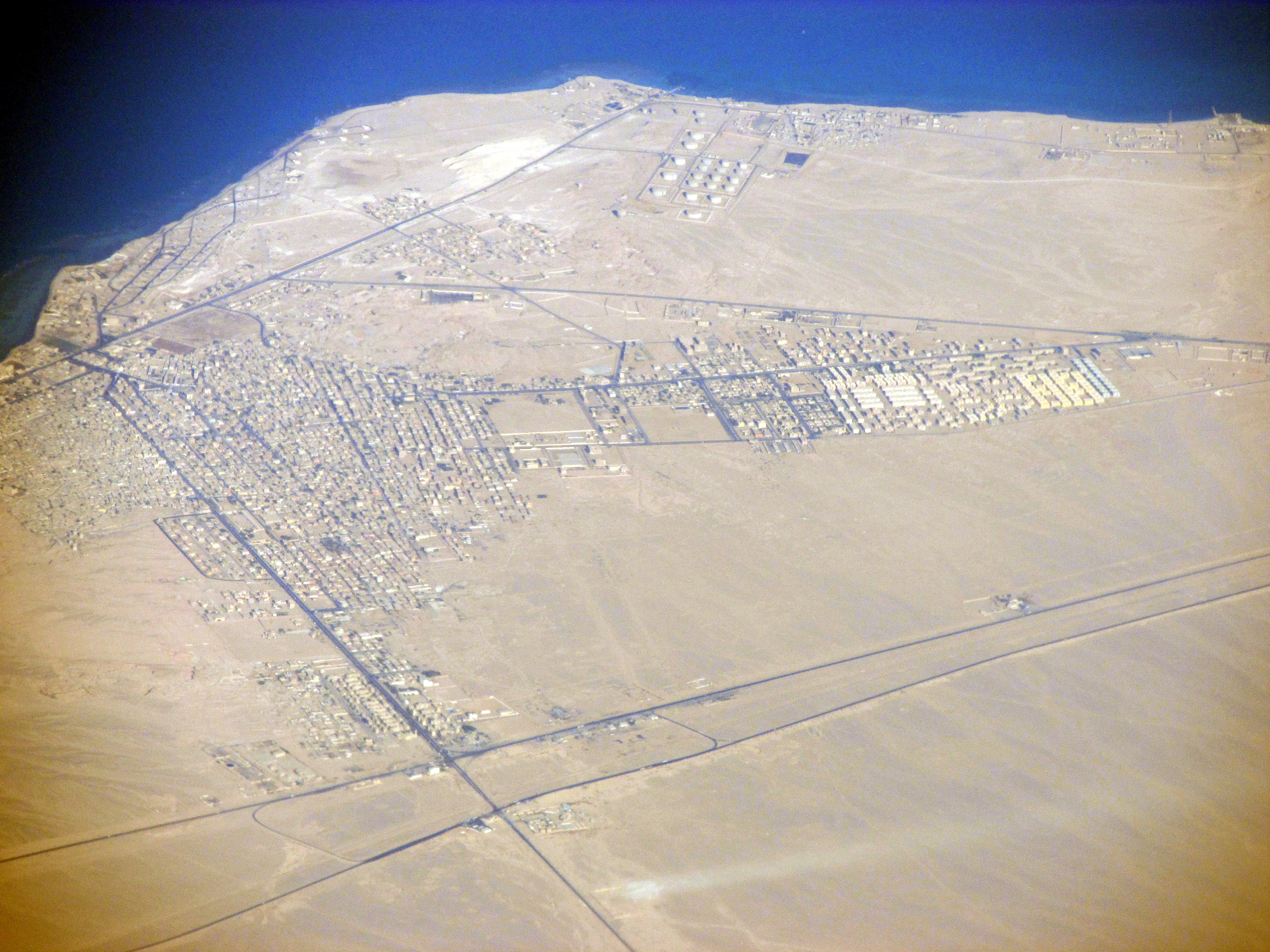

- Location in Egypt
- Coordinates: 28°21′35″N 33°04′39″E
- Country: Egypt
- Governorate: Red Sea

Area
  - Total: 13,847 km^{2} (5,346 sq mi)
- Elevation: 16 m (52 ft)

Population (2021)
  - Total: 45,108
  - Density: 3.2576/km^{2} (8.4371/sq mi)
- Time zone: UTC+2 (EET)
  - Summer (DST): UTC+3 (EEST)

Ra's Ghareb (Arabic: راس غارب Rās Ġāreb pronounced [ɾɑːs ˈɣæːɾeb]) is the northernmost of the markazes (municipalities) in the Red Sea Governorate, Egypt, situated on the African side of the Gulf of Suez. It has an area of 10,464.46 km². At the 2006 Egyptian national census, the population numbered 32,369. It is one of the leading centers of petroleum production in Egypt, having housed the main operations for first the Anglo-Egyptian Oilfields Ltd (a branch of Royal Dutch Shell) and then the Egyptian national petroleum company. For a time it was the capital of the Red Sea Governorate.

== See also ==
- List of cities and towns in Egypt
