= Tadef Subdistrict =

Tadef Subdistrict ناحية تادف
- Subdistrict
- Location of Tadef Subdistrict within Aleppo Governorate

- Location in Syria
- Coordinates (Tadef): 36.3071°N 37.57298°E
- Country: Syria
- Governorate: Aleppo
- District: al-Bab
- Seat: Tadef

Area
  - Total: 321.24 km^{2} (124.03 sq mi)

Population (2004)
  - Total: 41,951
  - Density: 130.59/km^{2} (338.23/sq mi)
- Geocode: SY020201

Tadef Subdistrict (Arabic: ناحية تادف, romanized: Nāḩiyat Tādif) is a subdistrict of al-Bab District in northern Aleppo Governorate, northwestern Syria. Administrative centre is Tadef. At the 2004 census, the subdistrict had a population of 41,951.

== Cities, towns and villages ==
Cities, towns and villages of Tedef Subdistrict
PCode	Name	Population
C1219	Tadef	12,360
C1215	Arran	4,135
C1216	Abu Jabbar	2,821
C1230	Barlahin	2,367
C1226	Oweishiyeh	2,218
C1223	Kherbet Kiyar	2,059
C1220	Big Amya	1,674
C1227	Sarhan	1,604
C1218	Abu Taltal	1,582
C1235	Big Fikha	1,473
C1228	Eisheh	1,332
C1233	Qasr Elbreij	1,287
C1217	Kita	1,227
C1224	Um Khorzet Elbab	1,128
C1221	Deir Qaq	1,042
C1234	Magharet Abu Jabbar	1,039
—N/a	Ein Eldahab	669
C1222	Toman	516
C1225	Biret Elbab	447
C1229	Sheikh Dan	391
C1232	Qatar	307
C1231	Btoshiyet Elbab	108
