= Maskanah Plains offensive =

Offensive

- Part of the Syrian Civil War and the Russian military intervention in the Syrian Civil War
Date	9 May 2017 – 8 June 2017 (4 weeks and 2 days)
Location	Eastern Aleppo Governorate and southwestern Raqqa Governorate, Syria
Result	Syrian Army victory: The Syrian Army captures Maskanah, Jirah Airbase and many other towns and villages; The Syrian army re-entered the Raqqa Governorate

Belligerents
(Syria) Syrian Arab Republic; Syrian Armed Forces; Russia; Aerospace Forces	Islamic State of Iraq and the Levant

Commanders and leaders
Maj. Gen. Suheil al-Hassan	Abu Musab al-Masri † (Minister of War); Abu Uday Al-Iraqi †

Units involved
Syrian Armed Forces; Syrian Army; Tiger Forces; Syrian Arab Air Force; Liwa al-Quds; Al-Baggara tribe militias	Military of ISIL

Casualties and losses
156–184 killed (10 May–30 June)	32+ killed (by 18 May)

The Maskanah Plains offensive was an operation by the Syrian Army against the remaining Islamic State of Iraq and the Levant (ISIL) strongholds in the eastern countryside of the Aleppo Province, with the goal of recapturing the Maskanah Plains from ISIL and advancing into the Raqqa Governorate.

== Background ==
Between January and April 2017, the Syrian Army conducted an offensive that saw them capture the city of Dayr Hafir, the towns of Tadef and Al-Khafsah, and nearly 250 villages from ISIL. They also managed to cut off the Turkish Army from advancing further into Syria, and secured the water supply to Aleppo. The offensive was halted in early April, just short of capturing the Jirah Airbase, after government forces were redirected to fend off a rebel offensive against Hama.

== The offensive ==
=== Battle for Jirah Airbase ===
On 9 May, Syrian government forces restarted their operations against ISIL in the eastern countryside of Aleppo, as the Russian Air Force conducted heavy air-strikes against ISIL positions. The next day, government troops captured the village of Al-Mahdoum, after which they quickly attacked two villages southwest of the ISIL-held Jirah Airbase. The capture of the villages would give the Army fire-control over the airbase. However, the assault was eventually repelled due to heavy ISIL anti-tank missile fire. Two suicide-bombers and armed drones were also used by ISIL.

Late on 12 May, Syrian government troops captured the Jirah Airbase. ISIL forces in the Maskanah Plain then launched a counterattack on the airbase. A day later, after the ISIL counterattack was repelled, and the Syrian Army resumed their offensive in the region, capturing the last hill overlooking the airbase.

=== Capture of Maskanah ===
Led by the Tiger Forces, the Syrian Army swept through the countryside south and southwest of the airbase on 17 May, capturing 11 villages.

Between 21 and 24 May, the Tiger Forces captured another 11 villages, reaching within 6 km from ISIL's stronghold of Maskanah.

On 26 May, the Tiger Forces captured a village just three kilometers from Maskanah. The next morning, the Tiger Forces, alongside Al-Baqir tribal fighters, overran large areas east of Lake Jabbul, capturing 11 villages, and thus securing the entirety of Lake Jabbul for the first time since 2014. The same day, the Tiger Forces also took control of Maskanah's train station, as well as other nearby areas, bringing them to 1.5 km from Maskanah.

At the start of June, the Army continued with its advances around Maskanah, captured 16 villages and cutting off ISIL's main supply route towards Maskanah, effectively encircling it. On 3 June, the Syrian Army, led by the Tiger forces, captured Maskanah and the surrounding villages after ISIL fighters withdrew from the area, thus expelling ISIL from its last stronghold in Aleppo governorate. The next day, the Army came reached the boundaries of Raqqa Governorate after a battle, during which they seized two villages.

=== Advance to Raqqa's border ===
On 5 June, the Tiger Forces captured half a dozen villages in Masakanah's countryside, coming close towards fully expelling ISIL from Aleppo Governorate. The next day, government forces captured another six villages, officially reentering Ar-Raqqah province. On 8 June, ISIL's foothold crumbled near Lake Assad, resulting in the withdrawal of the group from areas near it, including around 20 villages, creating a no man's land between the Syrian Army and the Syrian Democratic Forces. By the end of the day, the Army took control of 15 of these villages.

== Aftermath – Advance into Raqqa ==
In mid-June 2017, the Syrian Army started a large advance into the Raqqa Governorate, eventually reaching the Ithriya-Tabqa road and capturing the town of Resafa.
