= Manbij Subdistrict =

Manbij Subdistrict ناحية منبج
- Subdistrict
- Location of Manbij Subdistrict within Aleppo Governorate

- Location in Syria
- Country: Syria
- Governorate: Aleppo
- District: Manbij
- Seat: Manbij

Area
  - Total: 1,219.88 km^{2} (471.00 sq mi)

Population (2004)
  - Total: 204,766
  - Density: 167.857/km^{2} (434.749/sq mi)
- Geocode: SY020500

Manbij Subdistrict (Arabic: ناحية منبج) is a subdistrict of Manbij District in Aleppo Governorate of northern Syria. The administrative centre is the city of Manbij.

At the 2004 census, the subdistrict had a population of 204,766.

== Cities, towns and villages ==
Cities, towns and villages of Manbij Subdistrict
Code	Name	Population
C1767	Manbij	99,497
C1683	Arab Hassan Kabir	2,763
C1731	Hayyah Kabirah	2,622
C1687	Awsajli Kabir	2,431
C1715	Saan al-Ghazal	2,002
C1719	Zunqul	1,966
C1716	Khirfan	1,780
C1755	Hajar Abyad	1,724
C1676	Tal Yasti	1,646
C1738	Mankubeh	1,600
C1679	Farat	1,568
C1743	Shweihet Kheznawi	1,560
C1783	Big Kaber - Big Kaberjeh	1,545
C1734	Um Myal Jafatlak	1,527
C1699	Anzawiyeh Manbaj	1,491
C1752	Little Hayyeh	1,453
#N/A	#N/A	1,444
C1730	Um Adaset Elfarat	1,431
C1704	Rafeeah	1,338
C1724	Little Hamam	1,325
C1769	Qanat Elghrra	1,297
C1674	Rasm Elmashrafeh	1,257
C1739	Rasm Elakhdar	1,228
C1791	Qabab Bonyeh - Qarajleh	1,197
C1717	Dadat	1,168
C1720	Saidiyeh	1,150
C1711	Tal Akhdar	1,137
C1741	Jota	1,127
C1682	Little Osajli	1,093
C1747	Shanhasa	1,075
C1735	Sghireh	1,008
C1762	Oshrieh	978
C1781	Big Madneh	945
C1764	Hudhud	909
C1709	Kherbet Nafakh	875
C1708	Kherbet Massi	872
C1714	Bir Kello	846
C1680	Kherbet Elsheyab	846
C1689	Tal Rafei	828
C1677	Btoshiyet Manbaj	808
C1775	Mashrafet Elbweir	805
C1684	Jeb Elqader	799
C1697	Jeb Elthor - Akrash	799
C1744	Janat Saleh Eltayyeb	793
C1710	Omriyeh	788
C1758	Arnabiet Doshan	786
C1737	Sayada	770
C1685	Um Jalal	756
C1723	Mahsana - Bak Weiran	753
C1681	Um Jlud	751
C1756	Big Jern	742
C1675	Kherbet Elhsan	727
C1772	Manilla Asaad	703
C1691	Twal	688
C1746	Um Edam	688
C1678	Asaliyeh	683
C1688	Dandaniya	683
C1721	Sultahiyeh	681
C1729	Ein Elnakhil	661
C1727	Hamran	646
C1754	Big Kharufiyeh	639
C1780	Little Madneh	626
C1777	Nejem Castle	587
C1700	Um Elsateh	578
C1707	Boyer	564
C1765	Mgheirat	525
#N/A	#N/A	482
C1774	Middle Warideh	469
C1733	Little Kharufiyeh	454
C1785	Qaber Imu	453
C1761	Little Jern	431
C1750	Sheikh Yehya	422
C1782	Big Mohtaraq	412
C1784	Little Mohtaraq	398
C1722	Jeb Elarus	376
C1726	Um Adase near Manbaj	362
C1701	Jeb Abyad	358
C1706	Big Jeb Elkalb	350
#N/A	#N/A	336
C1696	Khishfet Um Adaseh	332
C1793	Middle Majra	331
C1779	Bir Quraa	317
C1702	Jamusiyeh	314
C1712	Hamduniyeh	305
C1773	Upper Majra	292
C1753	Safi	290
#N/A	#N/A	290
C1749	Big Tahna	282
C1763	Lower Majra	282
#N/A	#N/A	281
C1795	Miloyran	274
#N/A	#N/A	271
C1748	Kabiret Manbaj - Bashli	249
C1713	Abu Jrin Manbaj	215
C1742	Ratwaniyeh	195
#N/A	#N/A	195
C1768	Karsan	182
C1789	Moaysera	164
C1790	Little Kaber - Little Kaberjeh	111
