= Jirah Air Base =

Jirah Air Base مطار الجراح العسكري
- IATA: none; ICAO: OS62

Summary
- Airport type: Military
- Owner: (Syria) Syrian Armed Forces
- Operator: Syrian Air Force
- In use: Unknown–present
- Coordinates: 36°5′51″N 37°56′25″E

Map
- Location in Syria

Jirah Air Base (sometimes spelled al-Jarrah) is a small airbase of the Syrian Air Force.

== History ==
After surrounding the airbase in the middle of January 2013, the base was captured by opposition fighters from Ahrar al-Sham and the Free Syrian Army on 12 February. It fell under ISIS control in January 2014. On 9 March 2017, the Ba'athist Syrian Army launched an assault to recapture the airbase. On 12 May 2017, the SAA recaptured the airbase from ISIS in the Maskanah Plains offensive and had it fully secured by 29 May. It was reopened in January 2023. A Syrian Air Defense Force unit was stationed there.

The base was captured by the Syrian Democratic Forces (SDF) following the Syrian Army collapse during the 2024 Northwestern Syria offensive. SDF withdrew east of the Euphrates on 17 January 2026 during an offensive by the Syrian transitional government forces.

== See also ==
- List of Syrian Air Force bases
