= Deir Ali =

Deir Ali دير علي
- Village
- Location within Syria
- Coordinates: 33°17′1″N 36°18′9″E
- Country: Syria
- Governorate: Rif Dimashq
- District: Markaz Rif Dimashq
- Subdistrict: al-Kiswah

Population (2004 census)
  - Total: 4,368
- Time zone: UTC+2 (EET)
  - Summer (DST): UTC+3 (EEST)

Deir Ali (Arabic: دير علي) is a small town in southern Syria, administratively part of the Rif Dimashq Governorate. According to the Syria Central Bureau of Statistics, Deir Ali had a population of 4,368 in the 2004 census. Its inhabitants are predominantly members of the Druze community.

== History ==
The town was historically a village known as Lebaba, and contains the archaeological remains of a Marcionite church. These include an inscription dated to 318 CE, which is the oldest known surviving inscribed reference, anywhere, to Jesus:

The meeting-house of the Marcionites, in the village of Lebaba, of the Lord and Saviour Jesus the Good -Erected by the forethought of Paul a presbyter, in the year 630 Seleucid era This gained the attention of the First Bible Network (FBN.)

In 1838, Eli Smith noted Deir Ali's population as being Druze.

The Arab Gas Pipeline passes through the area and supplies gas to a modern power station (estimated cost 250 million euros) in the town; the pipeline junction at the power station links the power grids of Egypt, Syria, and Jordan.

== See also ==
- Druze in Syria

== Bibliography ==
- Firro, Kais (1992). A History of the Druzes. Vol. 1. BRILL. ISBN 9004094377.
- Robinson, E.; Smith, E. (1841). Biblical Researches in Palestine, Mount Sinai and Arabia Petraea: A Journal of Travels in the year 1838. Vol. 3. Boston: Crocker & Brewster.
