= Al-Khafsah =

Al-Khafsah الخفسة
- Village
- Location of Al-Khafsah in Syria
- Coordinates: 36°13′51″N 38°01′18″E
- Country: Syria
- Governorate: Aleppo
- District: Manbij
- Subdistrict: Al-Khafsah

Population (2004)
  - Total: 5,393
- Time zone: UTC+2 (EET)
  - Summer (DST): UTC+3 (EEST)

Al-Khafsah (Arabic: الخفسة), also spelled Khafsa, is a village located 77 kilometers (48 mi) east of Aleppo in northern Syria. In the 2004 census, it had a population of 5,393.

Al-Khafsah is the administrative center of Al-Khafsah Subdistrict of the Manbij District.

In June 2016, the village was under control of ISIL. On 8 September 2016, ISIL evacuated its headquarters in al-Bab and moved it to Al Khafsah with dozens of vehicles carrying militants and weapons. This came a day after Turkish-led rebel forces expressed their goal of capturing al-Bab. On the evening of 7 March 2017, Khafsa was captured by the Syrian Arab Army (SAA).
