= Gulf of Suez =

Gulf of the Red Sea separating African Egypt from the Sinai Peninsula

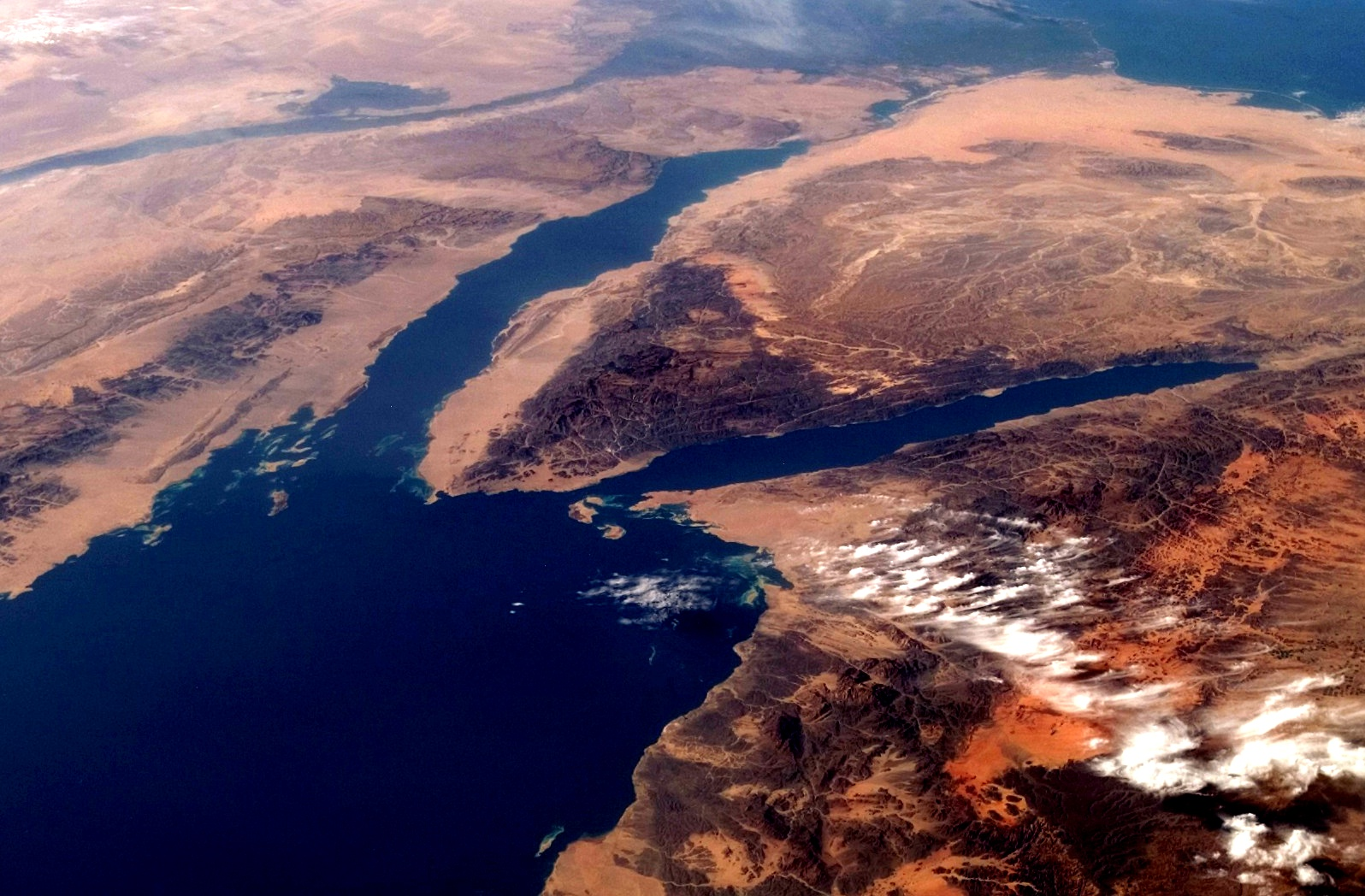
- Visible bodies are the Gulf of Suez (west, left in photo), the Gulf of Aqaba (east, right in photo), and the Red Sea (south, bottom left in photo). Photo dated February 2009.
- Interactive map of Gulf of Suez
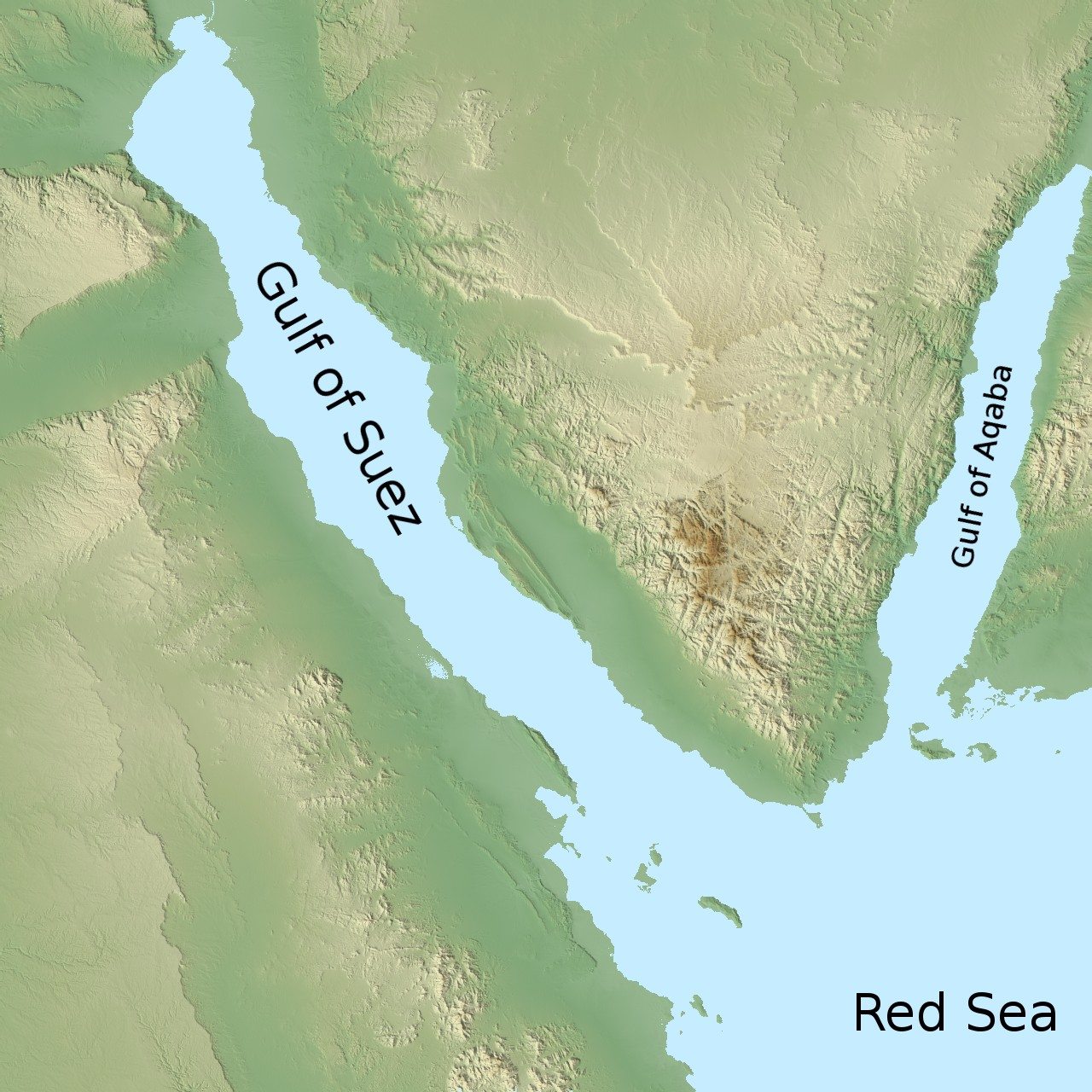
- Location: North Africa and West Asia
- Coordinates: 28°45′N 33°00′E
- Basin countries: Egypt
- Max. length: 314 km (195 mi)
- Max. width: 32 km (20 mi)
- Average depth: 40 m (130 ft)
- Max. depth: 70 m (230 ft)

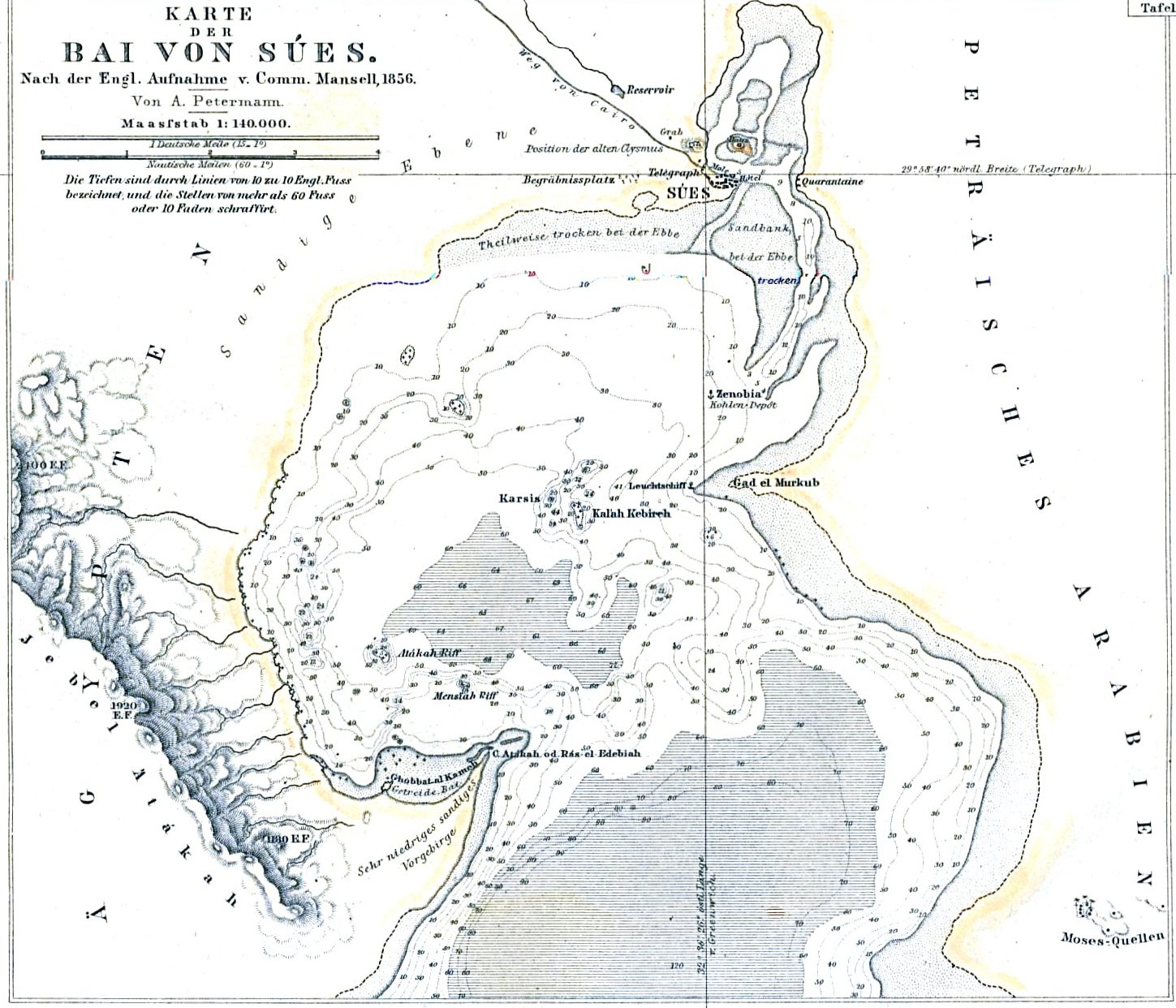
Northernmost part of Gulf of Suez with town Suez on the map of 1856

The Gulf of Suez (Arabic: خليج السويس, romanized: khalīǧ as-suwais; formerly بحر القلزم, baḥar al-qulzum, lit. "Sea of Calm") is a gulf at the northern end of the Red Sea, to the west of the Sinai Peninsula. Situated to the east of the Sinai Peninsula is the smaller Gulf of Aqaba. The gulf was formed within a relatively young but now inactive Gulf of Suez Rift rift basin, dating back about 26 million years. It stretches some 300 kilometres (190 mi) north by northwest, terminating at the Egyptian city of Suez and the entrance to the Suez Canal. Along the mid-line of the gulf is the boundary between Africa and Asia. The entrance of the gulf lies atop the mature Gemsa oil and gas field. The gulf is considered one of the world's important maritime zones due to being an entrance to the Suez Canal.

== Geography ==
The gulf occupies the northwestern arm of the Red Sea between Africa and the Sinai Peninsula. It is the third arm of the triple junction rift system, the second arm being the Gulf of Aqaba.

=== Extent ===
The length of the gulf, from its mouth at the Strait of Gubal (alternate name: Strait of Jubal) to its head at the city of Suez, is 195 miles (314 km), and it varies in width from 12 to 20 miles (19 to 32 km).

The International Hydrographic Organization defines the southern limit of the gulf as "A line running from Ras Muhammad (27°43'N) to the South point of Shadwan Island (34°02'E) and thence Westward on a parallel (27°27'N) to the coast of Africa".

== Geology ==
The Gemsa Field was discovered in 1869, but did not produce until 1910. The Hurghada Field produced in 1913. By 1998, over 1900 wells had been drilled and 120 fields identified. The major oil source rock is the Upper Cretaceous marine Sudr Formation, the limestone Campanian Brown/Duwi Member in particular, which is 25–70 m (82–230 ft) thick in the gulf.

The gulf sedimentary basin stratigraphic section consists of prerift Paleozoic to Oligocene clastic rocks and carbonates, and synrift and postrift Miocene to Holocene clastics and evaporites. Three large oil fields are in the gulf: the El Morgan discovered in 1964, Belayim discovered in 1955, and the October Field discovered in 1977. The October Field produces from the Cretaceous Nubia Formation, the Upper Cretaceous Nezzazat Formation, the Miocene Nukhul Formation, and the Miocene Asl Member of the Upper Rudeis Formation.
