= Twal =

Twal is a surname. Notable people with the surname include:

- Alex Twal (born 1996), Australian rugby league player
- Alia Twal, Jordanian pilot
- Fouad Twal (born 1940), Jordanian Archbishop

== See also ==
- Tal (name)
- Twan
