= Abu Qilqil Subdistrict =

Abu Qilqil Subdistrict ناحية أبو قلقل
- Subdistrict
- Location of Abu Qilqil Subdistrict within Aleppo Governorate

- Location in Syria
- Coordinates (Abu Qilqil): 36.4261°N 38.1028°E
- Country: Syria
- Governorate: Aleppo
- District: Manbij
- Seat: Abu Qilqil

Area
  - Total: 394.38 km^{2} (152.27 sq mi)

Population (2004)
  - Total: 47,109
  - Density: 119.45/km^{2} (309.38/sq mi)
- Geocode: SY020501

Abu Qilqil Subdistrict (Arabic: ناحية أبو قلقل) is a subdistrict of Manbij District in Aleppo Governorate of northern Syria. Administrative centre is the town of Abu Qilqil.

At the 2004 census, the subdistrict had a population of 47,109.

== Cities, towns and villages ==
Cities, towns and villages of Abu Qilqil Subdistrict
Code	Name	Population
C1796	Himar Labda	3,681
C1798	Abu Qilqil	2,742
C1822	Jubb Hamza	2,089
C1834	Qeshlet Yusef Basha	2,068
C1814	Kherbet Elrus	1,799
C1826	Qanaqebli	1,739
C1818	Southern Tal Arish	1,730
C1833	Little Fors	1,639
C1807	Jeifiyet Elmashi	1,401
C1820	Kherbet Zamala	1,396
C1836	Tishrin Dam City	1,274
C1812	Kherbet Elsawda Manbaj	1,266
C1837	Noaimeh	1,248
C1804	Jeb Elkajli	1,233
C1832	Mahshiet Elsheikh Obeid	1,226
C1806	Shjif Dahabiyeh	1,162
C1803	Um Jern Manbaj	1,137
C1816	Kherbet Bashar	1,120
C1801	Jdidet Faras	1,108
C1827	Walia - Akirdali	1,046
C1831	Little Quraa	1,012
C1830	Big Fors	953
C1829	Qokhar	894
#N/A	Khirbat Tuwayni	865
C1819	Jeb Hassan Agha	852
C1799	Kherbet Elashra	828
C1811	Jeb Eltawil	814
C1815	Little Ghorra	800
C1825	Northern Qana	747
C1821	Khirbet Khalid	691
C1810	Big Ghorra	645
C1809	Sakawiyeh	639
C1835	Nmuqbilet Hassan Agha	578
C1797	Khofiyet Abu Qalqal	523
C1828	Mahshiet Eltawahin	513
C1813	Big Sandaliyeh	484
C1808	Hizeh	461
C1824	Lower Qana	456
C1802	Jeb Elbashama	434
C1800	Halula	394
C1823	Jeb Sheikh Obeid	244
C1805	Big Hama	137
C1817	Jeb Nahid	110
