= Egyptian General Petroleum Corporation =

National oil company of Egypt

- Type: Public
- Industry: Oil and gas industry
- Founded: 1956
- Headquarters: Cairo, Egypt
- Products: Petroleum; Natural gas Petroleum products
- Owner: Ministry of Petroleum
- Website: http://www.egpc.com.eg

The Egyptian General Petroleum Corporation (EGPC) (Arabic: الهيئة المصرية العامة للبترول) is a national oil company of Egypt. EGPC's business includes crude oil exploration, refining, and storage. The company also produces lubricants and greases and offers services for oil and gas projects.

== History ==
The company was established in 1956 with its headquarters in Cairo. At the foundation stage it was named General Petroleum Authority. It was renamed as Egyptian General Petroleum Corporation in 1962. In February 2018, EGPC partnered with Israel-based company Noble and Delek in a venture called EMED to acquire a 39% stake in the East Mediterranean Gas Company. As director of the majority partner in EMED serves former chairman of EGPC Mohammed Shoeib. In 2020, EGPC announced to license about 60 new fuel across Egypt. The company also announced its plans to invest EGP 379 million to build fuel stations and warehouse storage. Abed Ezz El Regal is CEO of EGPC.

On April 7, 2023, it was reported that EGPC joined a Memorandum of Understanding to support global efforts to set science-based targets for their net zero goals.

In May 2026, Agiba Petroleum Company, EGPC’s joint venture with Eni, announced the discovery of hydrocarbons at the South Bostan-1X exploration well. The reserves are estimated at about 330 billion cubic feet of gas and 10 million barrels of condensate and crude oil.

On 11 August 2026, a licensing round was opened for six EGPC exploration blocks in the Gulf of Suez, Sinai and Western Desert, with a deadline of 11 November 2026.

== Structure ==
EGPC owns 70% of shares in the Egyptian Natural Gas Company, as well as a 75% stake in the petroleum-industry support airline Petroleum Air Services (the remaining 25% being held by the British firm Bristow Group). In 2018 the company had 2,000 employees.

== Chief executives ==
- Mahmoud Younis (May 16, 1956 – October 14, 1956)
- Fathi Rizk (October 14, 1956 – May 19, 1959)
- Aziz Sedky (May 19, 1959 – December 25, 1961)
- Ahmed Kamel Al-Badri (December 25, 1961 – November 2, 1966)
- Hassan Amer (November 2, 1966 – September 13, 1967)
- Muhammad Halim (September 13, 1967 – May 23, 1968)
- Ali Waly (May 23, 1968 – October 4, 1971)
- Ahmad Ezz El-Din Hilal (October 4, 1971 – April 1, 1973)
- Muhammad Ramzi al-Laithi (April 1, 1973 – October 11, 1983)
- Abd al-Hadi Qandil (October 11, 1983 – August 3, 1987)
- Muhammad Ma’bad (August 3, 1987 – November 10, 1988)
- Hamdi Al-Banabi (November 10, 1988 – May 23, 1991)
- Mustafa Shaarawi (May 23, 1991 – May 11, 1996)
- Abd al-Khaliq Ayyad (May 11, 1996 – June 16, 2000)
- Muhammad Tawileh (June 16, 2000 – August 7, 2001)
- Ibrahim Saleh (August 7, 2001 – July 9, 2006)
- Abdel-Alim Taha (July 9, 2006 – February 2, 2010)
- Abdullah Ghorab (February 2, 2010 – March 20, 2011)
- Hani Dahi (March 20, 2011 – December 31, 2012)
- Sherif Haddara (January 1, 2013 – May 19, 2013)
- Tariq Al-Baratawi (May 19, 2013 – August 22, 2013)
- Tariq Al-Mulla (August 22, 2013 – October 15, 2015)
- Muhammad al-Masry (October 15, 2015 – April 7, 2016)
- Tariq Al-Hadidi (April 7, 2016 – March 14, 2017)
- Abed Ezz El-Regal (March 14, 2017 – January 28, 2022)
- Alaa El Batal (January 28, 2022 – Present)
- Salah El-Din Abdel Karim (September 12, 2024 – Present)

== See also ==
- Energy in Egypt
