= Energy in Egypt =

Egypt's energy consumption by sources

Energy in Egypt is an important sector of the Egyptian national economy. This article describes the energy and electricity production, consumption, export, and import in Egypt.

== Electricity ==
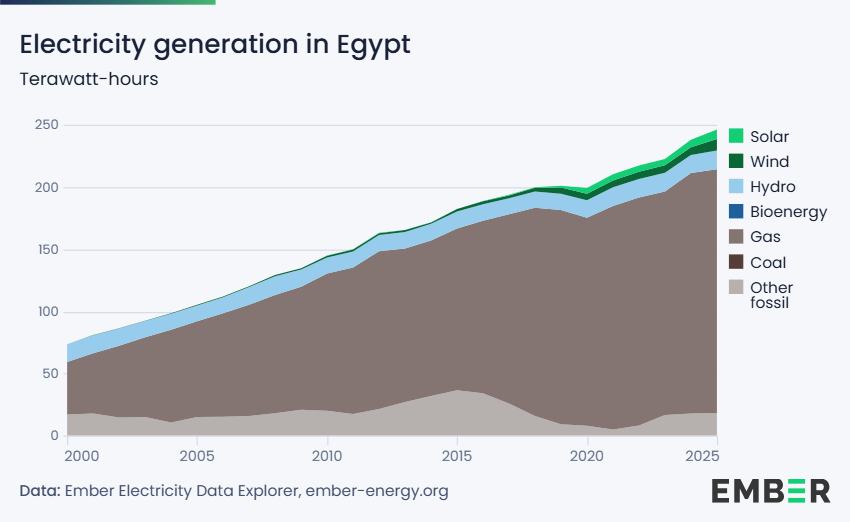
Electricity generation in Egypt in terawatt-hours

The electricity sector in Egypt has evolved from full state control to a diversified energy mix, incorporating natural gas, renewables, and nuclear power, with increasing private sector involvement and regional interconnection. While fossil fuels still dominate, generating 87% of Egypt's electricity in 2025, hydropower contributes 6%, and wind and solar account for 7%, a rise from 1% in 2015 but still below the global average of 13% and Africa's 6%.

Egypt remains Africa's largest producer of gas-fired electricity, accounting for 45% of the continent's total in 2022. Despite its reliance on fossil fuels, Egypt's per capita carbon emissions remain below the global average.

Egypt's electricity demand has more than doubled over the past two decades, driven by rapid population growth and industrial expansion. This surge has primarily been met by natural gas, which made up 84% of Egypt's electricity mix in 2023. To reduce its dependence on fossil fuels, Egypt has set a target of 42% renewable electricity by 2030. Egypt is also expanding its nuclear energy sector, with construction of the El Dabaa Nuclear Power Plant underway through a partnership with Russia's Rosatom.

Electricity access in Egypt reached 100% by 2016, ensuring universal coverage.

Energy in Egypt
	Population	Primary energy (TWh)	Production (TWh)	Export (TWh)	Electricity (TWh)	CO_{2}-emission (Mt)
2004	72.64	662	752	71	88	141
2007	75.47	782	957	153	111	169
2008	81.51	822	1,018	180	116	174
2009	83.00	837	1,026	174	123	175
2012	86.42				138	188
Change 2004-09	14.3%	27%	36%	145%	40%	25%
Mtoe = 11.63 TWh, Prim. energy includes energy losses

== Petroleum ==
=== Crude oil ===
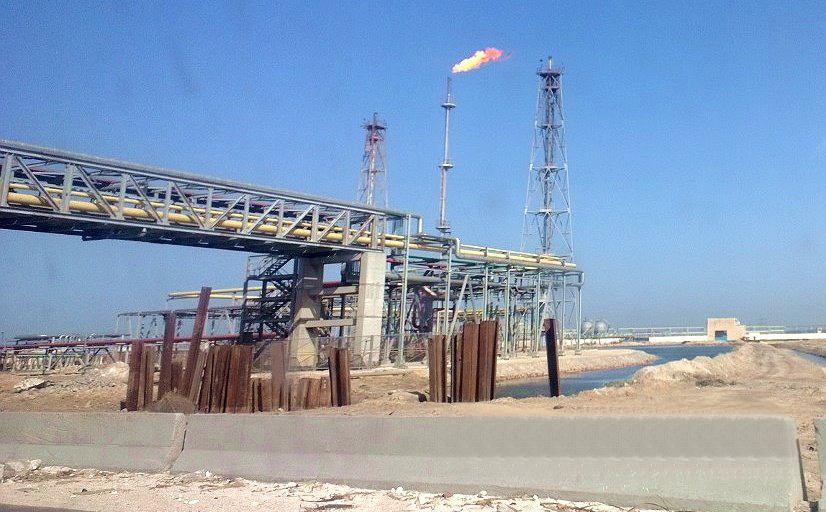
Oil refining in Alexandria

Egypt has the sixth-largest proved oil reserves in Africa. Over half of these reserves are offshore reserves. Although Egypt is not a member of OPEC, it is a member of the Organization of Arab Petroleum Exporting Countries.

As of 2005, Egypt's proven oil reserves were estimated at 3.7 billion bbl (590 million m^{3}), of which 2.9 billion bbl (460 million m^{3}) was crude oil and 0.8 billion bbl (130 million m^{3}) were natural gas liquids. Oil production in 2005 was 696,000 barrels per day (110,700 m^{3}/d), (down from 922,000 barrels per day (146,600 m^{3}/d) in 1996), of which crude oil accounted for 554,000 barrels per day (88,100 m^{3}/d).

The National oil company is the Egyptian General Petroleum Corporation.

Egypt is estimated to hold 12,446 million barrels (1,980 million cubic metres) initial recoverable liquid reserves. After decades of production, it is estimated that the country has approximately 1,888.9 million bbl (300 million m^{3}) recoverable oil remaining, as of January 2011. These figures indicate that 83% of Egypt's recoverable oil reserves have been depleted.

=== Shale oil ===
The Safaga-Quseir area of the Eastern Desert is estimated to have reserves equivalent about 4.5 million barrels (720×10^{3} m^{3}) of in-place shale oil and the Abu Tartour area of the Western Desert is estimated to have about 1.2 million barrels (190×10^{3} m^{3}) of in-place shale oil. The 1000 to 2000 foot thick and organically rich, total organic content of about 4%, Khatatba Formation in the Western Desert is the source rock for wells there and is a potential source for shale oil and shale gas.

Apache Corporation, using substantial assets acquired in 2010 from BP after the Deepwater Horizon disaster, is the major operator in the Western Desert, often in joint ventures with Egyptian General Petroleum Corporation (EGPC) such as Khalda Petroleum Company and Qarun Petroleum Company. In 1996 Apache merged with Phoenix Resources, which had made the Qarun discovery in 1994, and took over operations of the Qarun Concession in Egypt.

Apache has developed about 18% of the 10 million acres it controls, in 2012 running a score of rigs; drilling about 200 development and injection wells; and about 50 exploration wells with a success rate of about 55%. Plans for 2013 included an investment of about $1 billion in development and exploration. On 29 August 2013 Apache announced sale of a 1/3 share of its Egyptian assets to Sinopec for $3.1 billion effective 1 January 2014; Apache would continue to be the operator.

=== Oil shale ===
Oil shale resources were red in the Safaga-Quseir area of the Eastern Desert in the 1940s. The oil shale in the Red Sea area could be extracted by underground mining. In the Abu Tartour are, oil shale be mined as byproduct whilst mining for phosphates. Oil shale in Egypt is foreseen as a potential fuel for the power generation.

== Natural gas ==
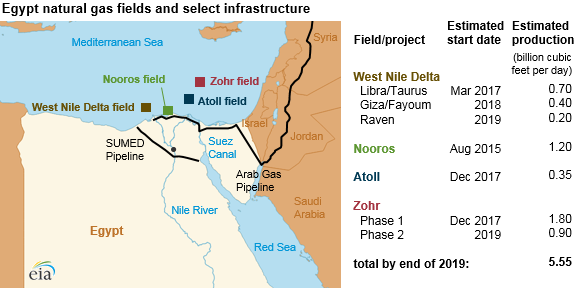
A map of natural gas fields in Egypt

Egypt has long pursued the expansion of its natural gas industry, leveraging its significant reserves to meet both domestic demand and international export obligations. By 2005, Egypt's proven natural gas reserves were estimated at 66 trillion cubic feet, ranking third in Africa. Production continued to grow, reaching 2 trillion cubic feet by 2013, with domestic consumption accounting for nearly 1.9 trillion cubic feet.

The Arab Gas Pipeline was developed to facilitate exports to Jordan, Syria, and Lebanon, with a planned total length of 1,200 km, offering the potential to extend gas deliveries to Europe. Egypt developed its liquefied natural gas (LNG) infrastructure, with the Damietta and Idku LNG plants operated by Egyptian LNG and SEGAS LNG, making it a key supplier to international markets.

In the 2000s, foreign investment played a crucial role in the expansion of Egypt's gas industry. BP, Eni, and Gas Natural Fenosa developed major LNG export facilities, but rising domestic consumption led to reduced exports, idling much of Egypt's LNG capacity. By 2014, Egypt shifted its energy strategy to prioritize domestic demand, which significantly curtailed gas exports. As part of efforts to address supply shortages, Egypt signed an agreement with Israel to import 7 billion cubic meters annually from the Leviathan field over 15 years, with gas transported via an underwater pipeline.

In March 2015, BP announced a $12 billion investment to develop offshore gas fields in Egypt's West Nile Delta, a project expected to contribute one-quarter of Egypt's total gas output. BP planned to extract and process gas onshore, with production beginning in 2017. The investment included the Atoll field, which commenced production in 2018 and delivered approximately 300 million standard cubic feet per day (mmscfd) to Egypt's national grid. BP also expanded operations in the North Damietta concession, where production from the Qattameya discovery began in 2020.

The discovery of the Zohr gas field in 2015 marked a major milestone in Egypt's energy sector. Located 190 km north of Port Said in the Shorouk Block, Zohr was discovered by the Italian oil giant Eni, holding an estimated 30 trillion cubic feet of natural gas across 100 square kilometers. Development of Zohr progressed at record speed, with production beginning in December 2017, making it one of the fastest deepwater gas field developments in history. By August 2019, Zohr's output reached 2.7 billion cubic feet per day, significantly boosting Egypt's energy independence.

Despite these successes, Egypt's gas sector encountered challenges in the 2020s, as technical issues at Zohr led to production declines, impacting domestic supply. To mitigate the shortfall, Egypt secured agreements with Cyprus to import gas from the Cronos and Aphrodite fields, routing it to liquefaction plants in Idku and Damietta for re-export to Europe.

In February 2025, Egypt signed a $3 billion LNG deal with Shell and TotalEnergies for 60 cargoes of LNG, securing critical energy supplies for both domestic consumption and export markets. Meanwhile, Egypt has embarked on efforts to revitalize Zohr's production, with plans to drill new wells and boost output by 220 million cubic feet per day. A significant purchase of LNG was reported to be imminent in June 2025, with analysts noting the implications for Egypt's reliance on imports as opposed to its own LNG production.

In January 2026, Israel and Egypt signed a multibillion-dollar expansion of their existing natural gas agreements, aimed at strengthening regional energy cooperation and securing supply lines to the Mediterranean. The agreement facilitates a significant increase in gas flow from Israel's Leviathan and Tamar offshore fields to Egyptian liquefaction plants in Idku and Damietta. This expansion is specifically designed to boost natural gas exports to European markets as part of a broader strategy to reduce Europe's reliance on Russian energy.

Egypt's long-term strategy continues to focus on maximizing natural gas exports while ensuring stable domestic supply, with ongoing exploration efforts and new investments aimed at reinforcing its position as a regional energy hub.

=== Current total production of natural gas in Egypt ===
As of July 2024, the total production of natural gas in Egypt was stated to be 5.7 billion cubic feet per day.

== Nuclear power ==
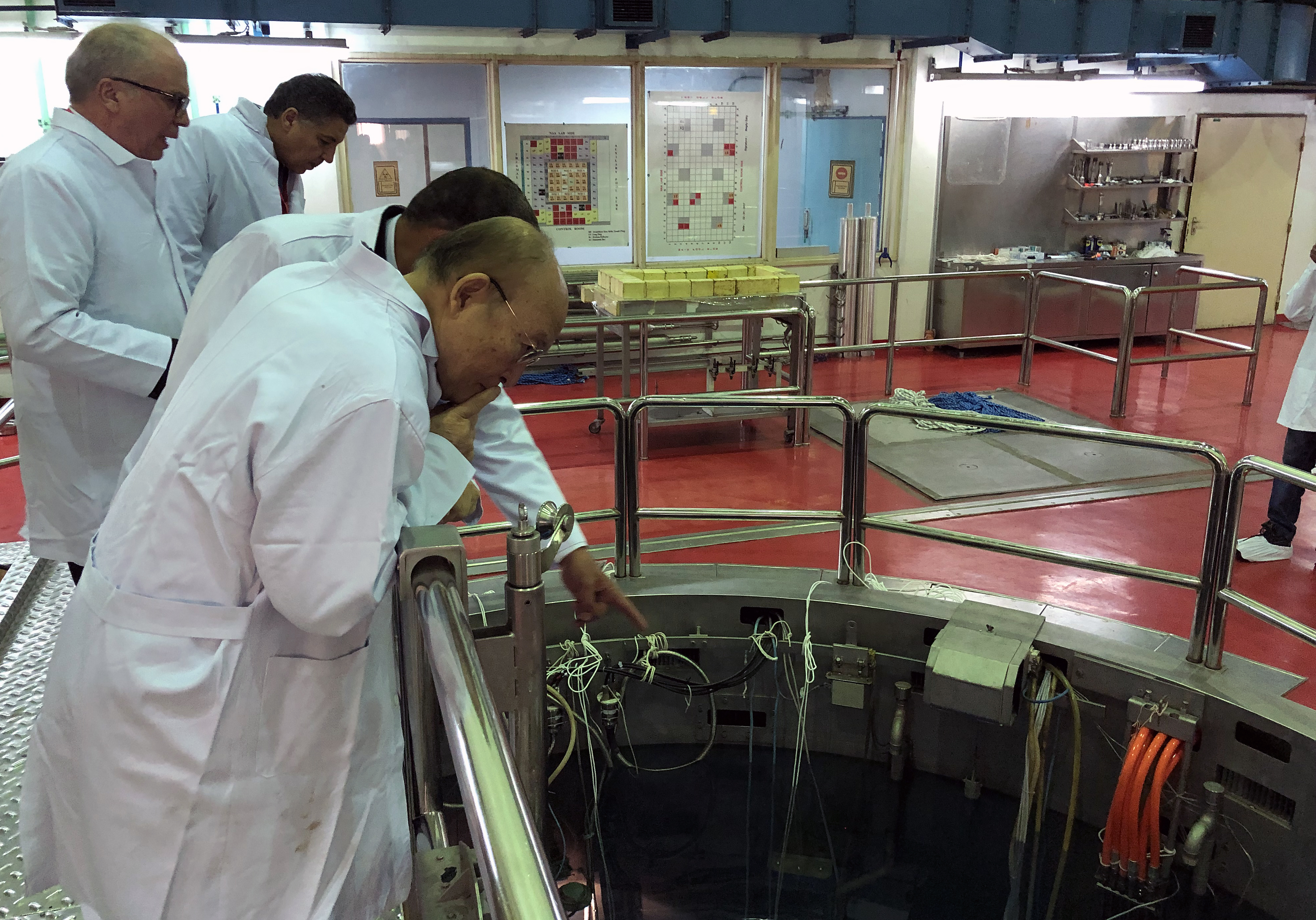
Research Reactor (ETRR-2) in Inshas, Egypt

Egypt has been considering the use of nuclear energy for decades: in 1964, a 150 MWe and in 1974 a 600 MWe, nuclear power stations were proposed. The Nuclear Power Plants Authority (NPPA) was established in 1976, and in 1983 the El Dabaa site on the Mediterranean coast was selected.

Egypt's nuclear plans were shelved after the Chernobyl accident. In 2006, Egypt announced it would revive its civilian nuclear power programme, and build a 1,000 MW nuclear power station at El Dabaa. Its estimated cost at the time was US$1.5bn, and the plans were to do the construction with the help of foreign investors.

In March 2008, Egypt signed an agreement with Russia on the peaceful uses of nuclear energy. In June 2009, the Egyptian Nuclear Plant Authority signed a $160 million contract for 8 years with the Australian Worley Parsons corporation in which this company would help Egypt build the power plant. During the Egyptian Revolution of 2011, the military council decided to temporarily stop the power plant construction until the next parliamentary elections.

On November 7, 2013, the Interim President of Egypt, Adly Mansour stated that Egypt will re-commence its nuclear power program by building its first nuclear power plant in El Dabaa, a small coastal town in Marsa Matrouh governate. Prior to Mansour's announcement, the city of El Dabaa had control of the land allocated to the power plant construction site but now the Egyptian army has complete control of the land in Marsa Matrouh. The military planned to build the nuclear power plant by 2016. In 2015, contracts were signed with a Russian company to begin the building of the plant at El Dabaa.

In April 2023, Egyptian media reported that Egypt and Russia were expediting the El Dabaa Nuclear Power Plant construction. They were said to be trying to get the plant at El-Dabaa, 135 kilometres west of Alexandria, back on schedule after initial delays due to the Russian invasion of Ukraine and COVID-19. The construction work on the plant, which was scheduled to conclude by 2030, had started in July 2022.

== Renewable energy ==
=== Hydropower ===
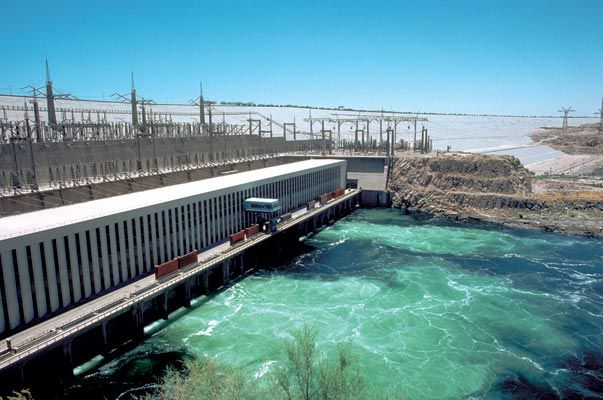
The power plant of the Aswan High Dam, with the dam in the background

The majority of Egypt's electricity supply is generated from thermal and hydropower stations. The four main hydroelectric generating stations currently operating in Egypt are the Aswan Low Dam, the Esna Dam, the Aswan High Dam, and the Naga Hamady Barrages. The Asyut Barrage hydropower plant is scheduled to be commissioned and added as a fifth station in 2016.

Almost all hydroelectric generation in Egypt comes from the Aswan High Dam. The Aswan High Dam has a theoretical generating capacity of 2.1GW; however, the dam is rarely able to operate at full design capacity due to low water levels. An ongoing refurbishment program is being enacted to not only increase the generating capacity of the dam to 2.4GW, but also extend the operational life of the turbines by about 40 years.

In 2011, Egypt produced 156.6 TWh gross, of which 12.9 TWh came from hydroelectric generation. The per capita consumption of electricity at the end of 2012 was 1910 kWh/yr, while Egypt's hydropower potential in 2012 was about 3,664 MW. As of 2009–2013, hydropower made up about 12% of Egypt's total installed power generation capacity – a small decline from 2006 to 2007 when hydropower made up about 12.8%.

The percentage of hydropower energy is steadily declining due to all major conventional hydropower sites already having been developed with a limited potential for further increase in generating capacity. Outside of the Aswan High Dam, the other hydropower sites are considered very modest and most new generation plants being built in Egypt are based on fossil fuels.

Even with the addition of the Asyut Barrage hydropower plant in 2016, hydropower development in Egypt is still lagging as the existing and developed hydropower plants are no longer being constructed at a rate that can support the increasing electricity consumption in Egypt. The population of Egypt has increased by 14.3% in the five-year period from 2004 to 2009 (OECD/World Bank). Every six months there are 1 million more Egyptians. Energy production grew by 36% between 2004 and 2009.

The only remaining significant hydropower site that is undeveloped in 2024 is the Qattara Depression. Several schemes have been proposed through the years to implement a Qattara Depression Project. None of which have been executed due to prohibitive capital costs and technical difficulties. Depending on the generating scheme chosen the Qattara Depression could potentially generate anywhere from 670MW to 6800MW.

=== Solar ===
Egypt has a high solar availability as a result of its hot desert climate. Photovoltaic systems are used in remote areas for water pumping, desalination, rural clinics, telecommunications, rural village electrification, etc. The proposed large-scale solar power project Desertec also involves Egypt.

In some areas, the country receives over 4,000 hours of sunshine per year, which is among the highest quantities registered in the world. Due to the sharp population growth and a series of blackouts during the summer caused by a supply shortage, Egyptian demand for solar energy is increasing.

In 2019, Egypt completed one of the biggest solar installations in the world, Benban Solar Park, which generates 1.8 GW to power 1 million homes.

In 2021, Egypt signed contracts worth $700 million with the Kom Ombo Solar Energy Complex which would create 10,000 jobs. The contracts include 32 solar energy projects.

In 2024, Egypt embarked on a major renewable energy initiative by announcing the construction of two solar power stations with a total investment of 1 billion Egyptian pounds ($20.60 million), funded by a European Union grant. The projects, which include a 10-megawatt station at the Assiut Oil Refining Company and a 6.5-megawatt station at the Egyptian General Petroleum Corporation (EGPC), are integral to Egypt's strategy to achieve 42% of its electricity generation from renewable sources by 2030. This accelerated target reflects Egypt's advantageous geographic conditions, characterized by high solar irradiation and vast desert areas, positioning it as a potential renewable energy hub in North Africa and the Middle East.

=== Wind ===
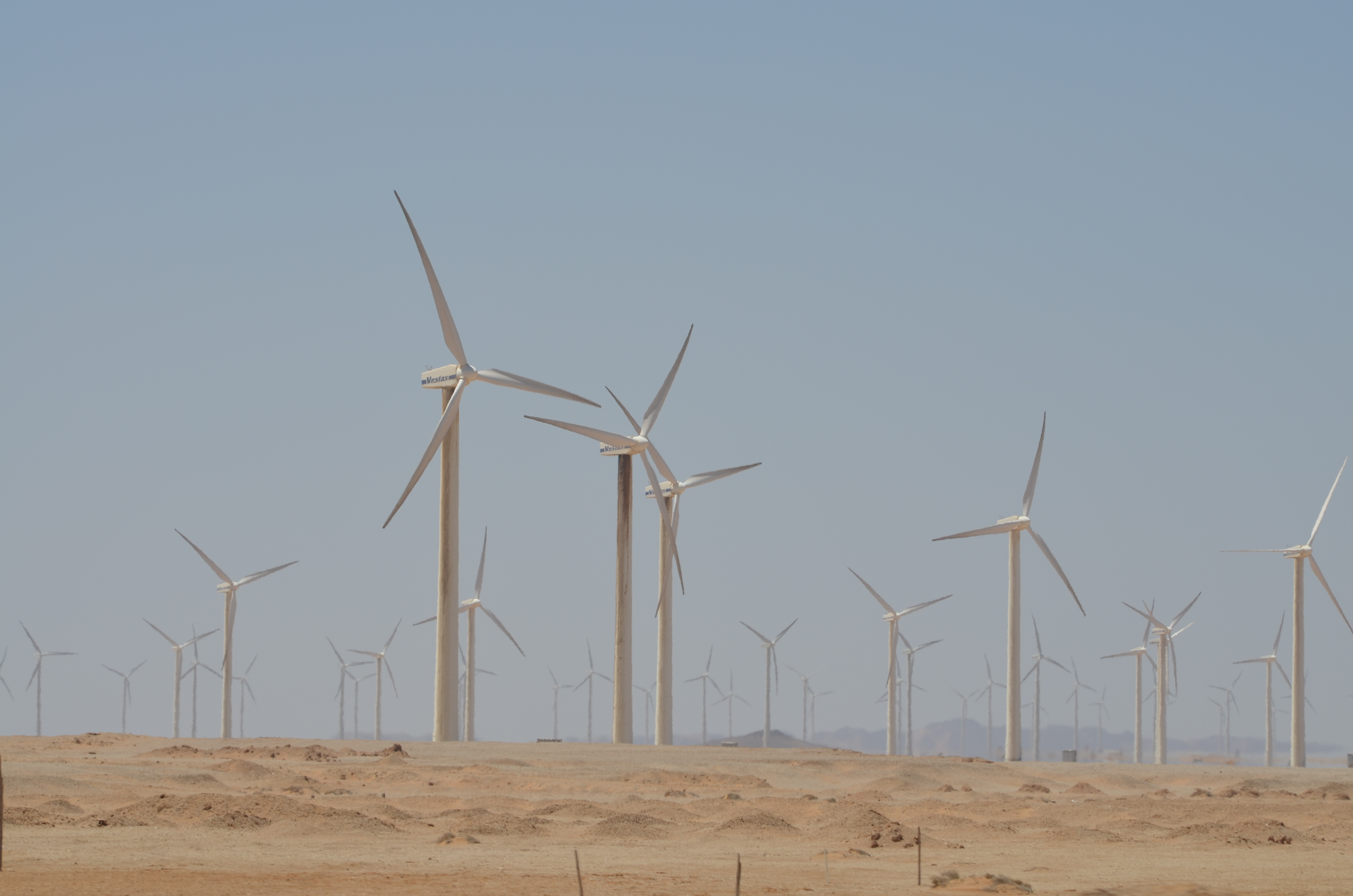
Wind farm at Zaafarana

Egypt has a high potential for wind energy, especially in the Red Sea coast area. As of 2021, 1,640 MW of wind energy was installed.

Egypt ranks third in Africa with 1,702 MW at the end of 2022, behind South Africa (3,442 MW) and Morocco (1,788 MW). New installations were 237 MW in 2021 and none in 2022.

In April 2025, Africa's largest wind farm began operating at Ras Ghareb, with 500 MW, and plans for 650 MW.

In October 2026 a new windfarm began construction in Shadwan Island in cooperation with Scatec with a planned capacity of 900 MW.

== See also ==
- Ministry of Electricity and Energy (Egypt)
- Renewable energy by country
- Waste management in Egypt

== Citations ==
- Survey of energy resources (PDF) (21 ed.). World Energy Council. 2007. ISBN 978-0-946121-26-7. Archived from the original (PDF) on 9 April 2011.
