= Manbij District =

Manbij District منطقة منبج
- District
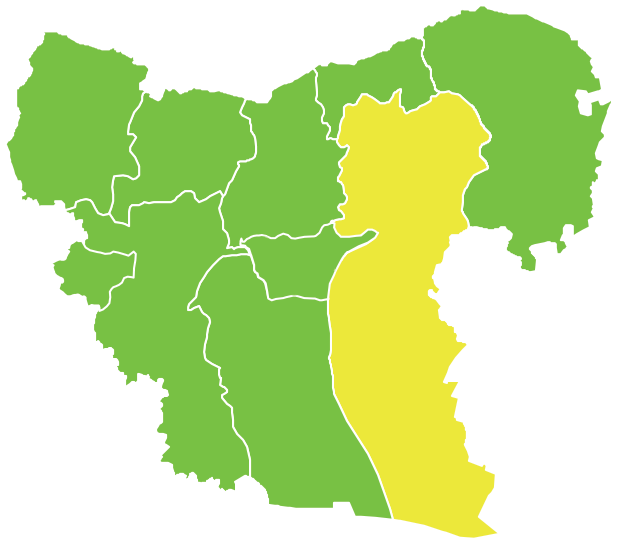
- Location of Manbij District within Aleppo Governorate

- Location in Syria
- Coordinates (Manbij): 36.53°N 37.95°E
- Country: Syria
- Governorate: Aleppo
- Seat: Manbij
- Subdistricts: 5 nawāḥī

Area
  - Total: 5,183.99 km^{2} (2,001.55 sq mi)

Population (2004)
  - Total: 408,143
  - Density: 78.7314/km^{2} (203.913/sq mi)
- Geocode: SY0205

Manbij District (Arabic: منطقة منبج, romanized: manṭiqat Manbiǧ) is a district of Aleppo Governorate in northern Syria. The administrative centre is the city of Manbij. At the 2004 census, the district had a population of 408,143.

Sub-Districts of Manbij District

The administrative center of Manbij Subdistrict shown above is the city of Manbij.

The administrative center of Abu Qilqil Subdistrict shown above is the city of Abu Qilqil.

The administrative center of al-Khafsah Subdistrict shown above is the city of al-Khafsah.

The administrative center of Maskanah Subdistrict shown above is the city of Maskanah.

A 2019 report has estimated the population of Manbij district at 450,000 with 90% of the population being Arab, 5% Kurdish and 5% Turkmen and Circassian.

== Sub-districts ==
The district of Manbij is divided into five subdistricts or nawāḥī (population as of 2004):

Subdistricts of Manbij District
Code	Name	Area	Population	Seat
SY020500	Manbij Subdistrict	1,219.88 km^{2}	204,766	Manbij
	Abu Kahf Subdistrict	1,219.88 km^{2}	204,766	Abu Kahf
SY020501	Abu Qilqil Subdistrict	394.38 km^{2}	47,109	Abu Qilqil
SY020502	al-Khafsah Subdistrict	3,063.46 km^{2}	92,368	al-Khafsah
SY020503	Maskanah Subdistrict	506.27 km^{2}	64,829	Maskanah

The Abu Kahf Subdistrict was separated from the Manbij Subdistrict in 2009.
