= Aleppo Governorate =

Aleppo Governorate مُحافظة حلب
- Governorate
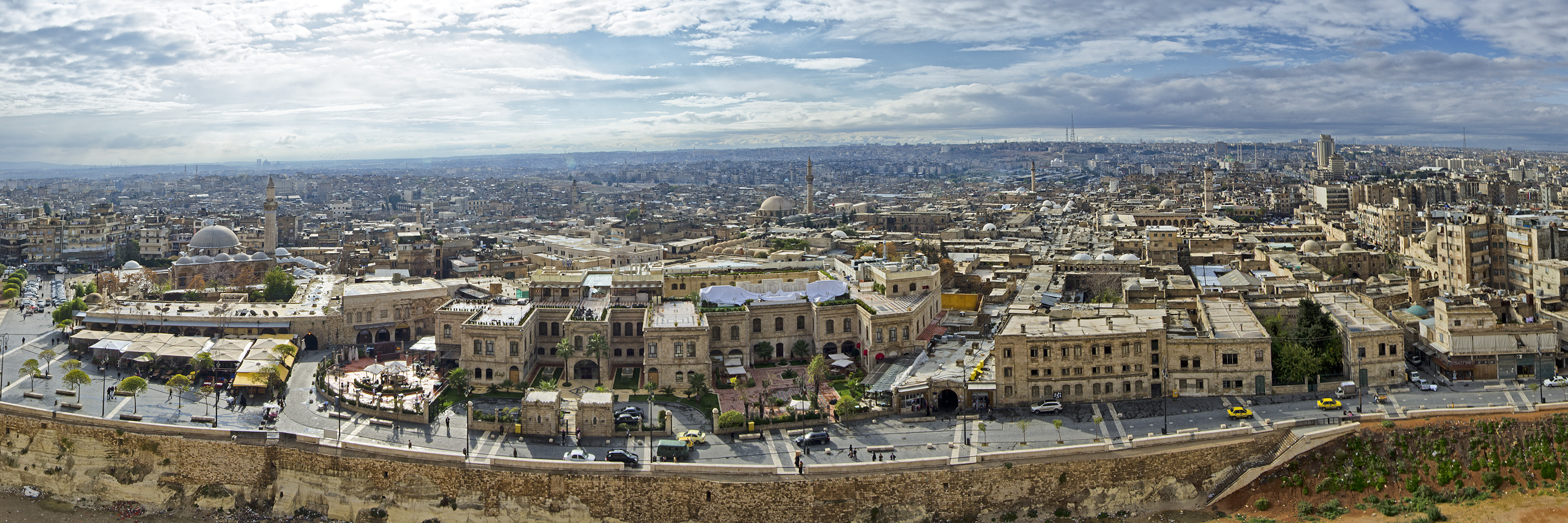
- The city of Aleppo, including its Ancient City

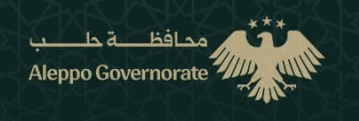
- Seal

- Map of Syria with Aleppo highlighted
- Interactive map of Aleppo Governorate
- Coordinates (Aleppo): 36.2°N 37.6°E
- Country: Syria
- Capital: Aleppo
- Manatiq (Districts): 10

Government
  - Governor: Azzam al-Gharib

Area
  - Total: 18,482 km^{2} (7,136 sq mi)

Population (2011)
  - Total: 4,868,111
  - Density: 263.40/km^{2} (682.20/sq mi)
- Time zone: UTC+3 (AST)
- ISO 3166 code: SY-HL
- Spoken languages: Levantine Arabic, Kurmanji Kurdish, Turkish
- Website: aleppo.gov.sy

Aleppo Governorate (Arabic: محافظة حلب, romanized: Muḥāfaẓat Ḥalab, [muˈħaːfaðˤat ˈħalab];) is one of the fourteen governorates of Syria. It is the most populous governorate in Syria with a population of more than 4,867,000 (2011 Est.), almost 23% of the total population of Syria. The governorate is the fifth in area with an area of 18,482 km^{2} (7,136 sq mi), or 18,498 square kilometres (7,142 sq mi)^{2}, about 10% of the total area of Syria. The capital is the city of Aleppo.

== History ==
=== Ancient ===
In Classical antiquity, the region was made up of three regions: Chalybonitis (with its centre at Chalybon or Aleppo), Chalcidice (with its center at Qinnasrin العيس), and Cyrrhestica (with its center at Cyrrhus النبي حوري). This was the most fertile and populated region in Syria. Under the Romans, the region was made in 193 CE part of the province of Coele-Syria or Magna Syria, which was ruled from Antioch. The province of Euphratensis was established in the 4th century CE in the east, its centre was Hierapolis Bambyce (Manbij).

Under the Rashidun and Umayyad Muslim dynasties, the region was part of the Jund Qinnasrin. In the Abbasid period the region was under the independent rule of the Hamdanids. The Mamluks and then later the Ottomans governed the area until 1918; under the Ottomans, the region was part of the Vilayet of Aleppo.

=== Modern Age ===
During the Tanzimat era of Ottoman governance in Aleppo, the authorities established the 1858 land reform law along with schemes to introduce new Bedouin settlers to northern Syria. These programs led to a stronger integration of Aleppo with the economy of the Ottoman heartland in Anatolia. It also paved the way for European capitalists to exploit agricultural resources of the region and caused internal trade to shift into the hands of European merchants.

In the early 20th century, during the French Mandate the region was part of the short-lived State of Aleppo.

Aleppo Governorate formerly included Idlib Governorate, until the latter was split off circa 1960.

=== Syrian Civil War (2011-present) ===
The governorate has been the scene of some of the fiercest fighting in the Syrian Civil War. In June 2017, nearly six years after the war's start, the province was almost equally divided between Syrian Government forces, Syrian Opposition forces, Turkish Army /TFSA and the Rojava/Syrian Democratic Forces. After fierce fighting, the Syrian Arab Army with Russian air support managed to take control of the capital of the Governorate, Aleppo, in December 2016 from Fatah Halab coalition.

In August 2016, the Turkish Land Forces, backed by the Free Syrian Army launched the Operation Euphrates Shield in order to drive ISIS from the border towns of Jarabulus, Azaz and Al-Bab. The operation resulted in success and starting in May 2017, the region is now under Turkish occupation. The Islamic State of Iraq and the Levant was largely removed from the area after the Syrian Arab Army launched the East Aleppo Offensive, the Maskanah Plains offensive, and the Southern Raqqa Offensive.

In January 2018, the Turkish army backed by the Free Syrian Army launched the Turkish military operation in Afrin against the YPG, which resulted in the capture of the city of Afrin and the entire Afrin District.

== Geography ==
The governorate has a 221-kilometre (137 mi) long northern boundary with the Kilis, Gaziantep, and Şanlıurfa provinces of Turkey. To the east lies Raqqa Governorate, to the south Hama Governorate, and to the west Idlib Governorate and Turkey's Hatay Province.

The governorate lies on a plateau known as the Aleppo plateau. The eastern and northern boundaries of the governorate correspond roughly to the eastern and northern boundaries of the plateau, although the northeastern portion of the governorate crosses the Euphrates valley into the Jazīrah plateau. The southeastern end of the governorate is continuous with the arid steppe of the northern Syrian Desert. To the south lie the eastern plains of Hama, and to the southwest lie the northern plains of Idlib.

The average elevation of the terrain is 379 metres (1,243 ft). The surface gradually slopes down in north–south and west–east directions, undulating gently with an amplitude of 10–30 m for each wave. The lowlands are covered with combined Paleozoic and Mesozoic sediments that average 4–5 km in thickness over the whole surface.

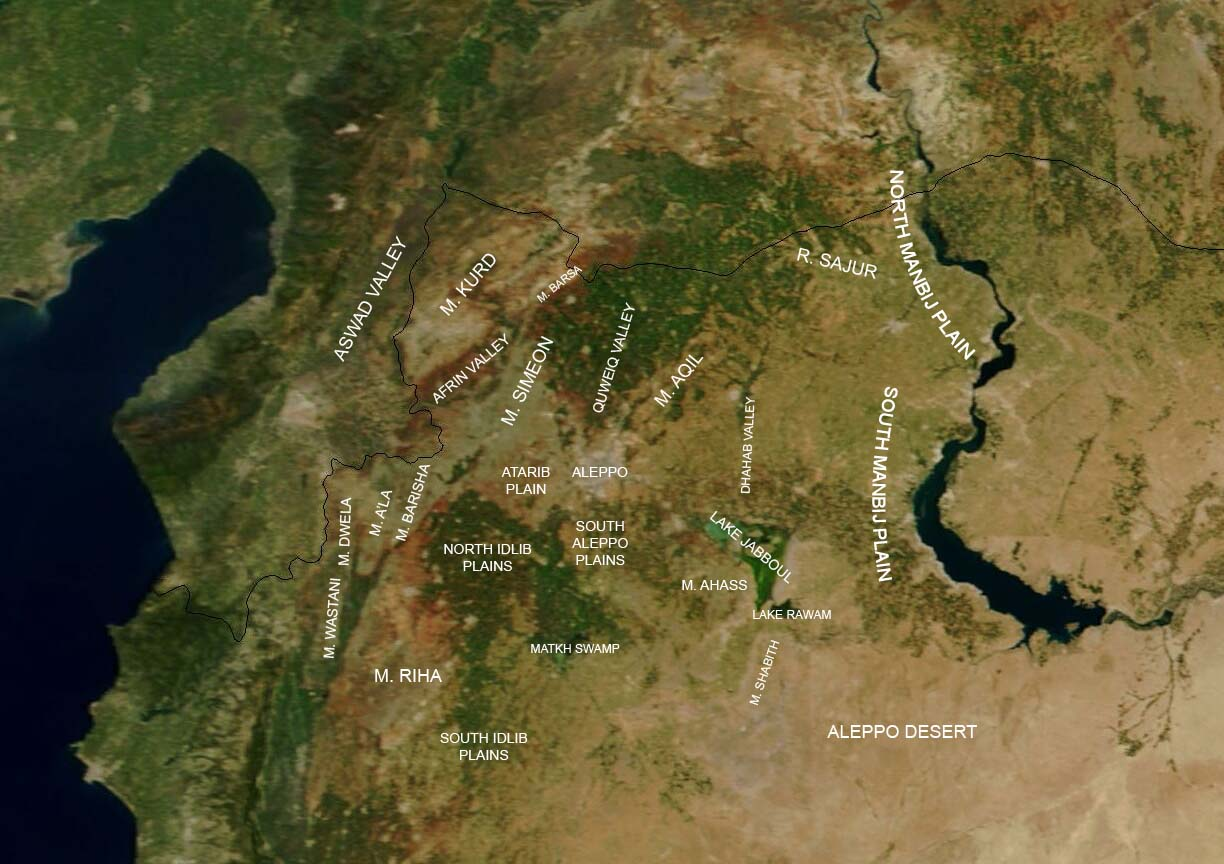
Geographic features of northwestern Syria

Starting from the valley of the Euphrates, the terrain rises forming the Manbij plain, and then sinks again at the Dhahab river valley in the east of Aleppo Governorate. The Dhahab drains the highlands north of al-Bāb and runs in a north–south direction for about 50 km (31 mi) until it drains into Lake Jabbul. West of the Dhahab valley the terrain rises again forming Mount 'Aqīl (Mount Taymar) west of Bāb and Mount Ḥaṣṣ west of Lake Jabboul. The terrain sinks again forming the valley of River Queiq. The endpoint of Quwēq, the Maṭkh swamp (249 metres (817 ft)), is the lowest point in Aleppo Governorate. West of the Quwēq is Mount Simeon. South of Mount Simeon is the plains of Idlib. The river 'Afrīn runs west of Mount Simeon. To the west of river 'Afrīn, the land rises again forming Kurd Mountain. The highest point in the governorate, Mount Bulbul (1,269 metres (4,163 ft)), is located in the northern part of Mount Kurd. River 'Ifrīn runs from north to south between Mount Simeon and Mount Kurd and then turns west to the Orontes valley, thus separating Kurd Mountain from Ḥārim Mountains to the south.

The governorate is generally deforested except for a dispersed forest of about 50 square kilometres (19 sq mi) on the eastern slope of Mount Kurd where it faces the plain of A'zaz. The main trees are Aleppo pine and oak.

Arable land makes up 66% of the total area in the governorate. The main crops are olives, figs, plums, pomegranates, vegetables, grains, rice, and pistachios. Pistachio is called in Syria fustuq Ḥalabī (Aleppo pistachio). Rivers traditionally supported agriculture; the main rivers in Aleppo are the Quwēq, 'Ifrīn, Sājūr, Dhahab, Aswad, and Euphrates. However, all of these rivers arise in Turkey, and due to irrigation projects on the Turkish side of the border, the flow of these rivers dropped so much that most of them could no longer support agriculture. The Quwēq, for example, dried up completely in the 1950s. The vanishing of the rivers forced farmers to depend largely on rainfall and on water diverted from the Euphrates. A pumping station at Maskanah (95 km east of Aleppo) provides drinking water for Aleppo from the Euphrates. Recently Euphrates water has been diverted to revive the dead Qwēq river, and thus revive agriculture in the plains south of Aleppo. Urban areas, highlands, swamps, forests, and grazing land make up 34% of the total area of the governorate. The remaining 14% is a desert area in the southeast that is continuous with the Syrian Desert and known as the Aleppo Desert (Arabic: بادية حلب).

The largest lake in the governorate is lake Sabkhat al-Jabbul, a Ramsar salt lake located 40 kilometres (25 mi) southeast of Aleppo. Euphrates Lake (the largest lake in Syria) separates Aleppo Governorate from Raqqa Governorate. Other artificial lakes include the Lake of 17 April on the River Ifrīn and the revived Shabā Lake on River Quwēq.

Archaeological sites are abundant in the governorate, especially at Mount Simeon in the west and the plains that extend beyond towards Antioch and Idlib. This region, known as the Limestone Massif, has the largest concentration of Late Antiquity churches in the world, with a unique Syrian architectural style. It also has the famous Dead Cities of Syria.

=== Cities ===
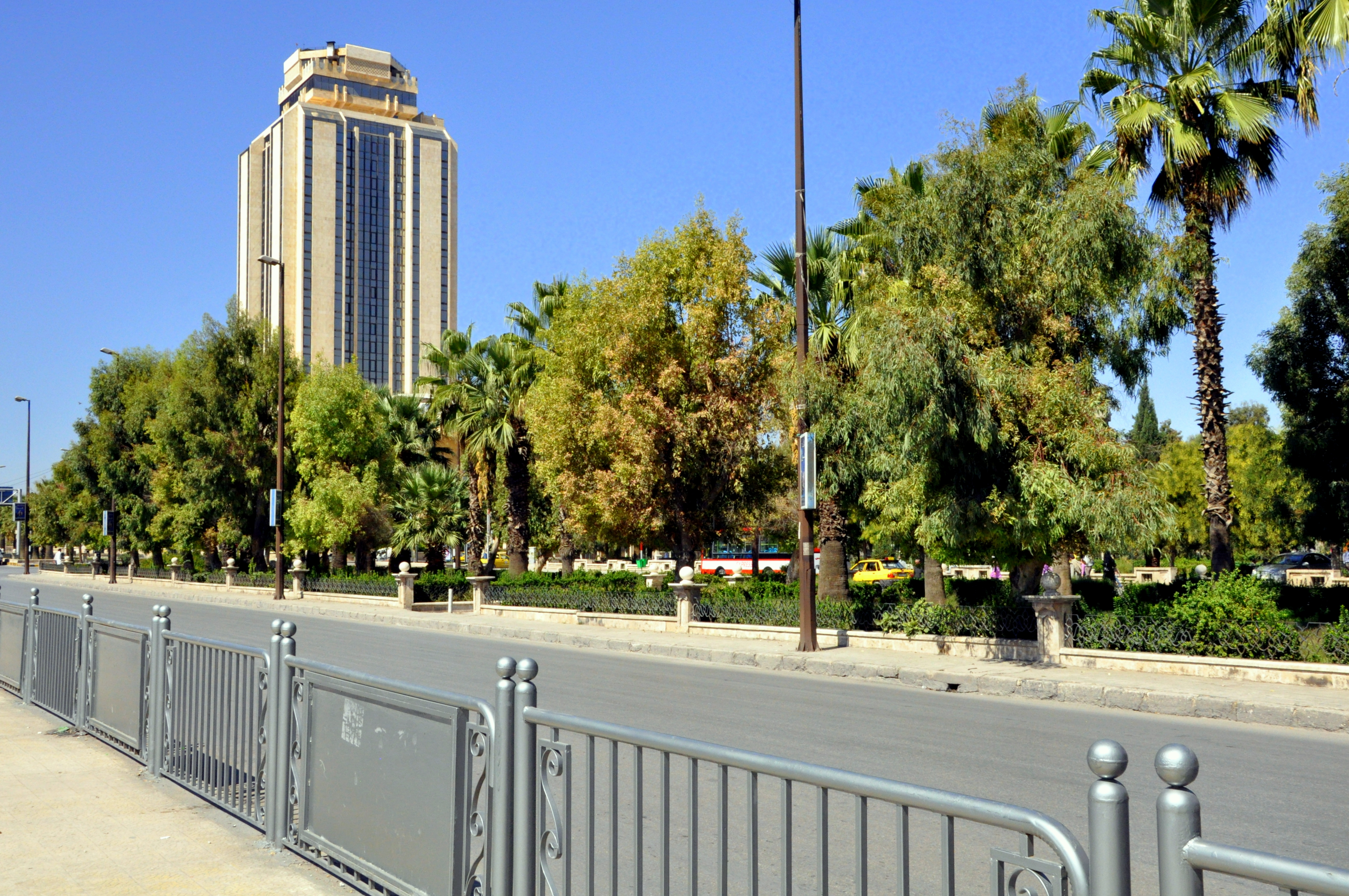
Aleppo city hall, the seat of the governorate and the city council

The following cities are the administrative centres of the districts in Aleppo Governorate (Population based on 2004 official census):

City	Population (2004)
Aleppo	2,132,100
Manbij	99,497
As-Safira	63,708
Al-Bab	63,069
Kobani	44,821
Afrin	36,562
Azaz	31,623
Dayr Hafir	18,948
Jarabulus	11,570
Atarib	10,657

=== Districts ===
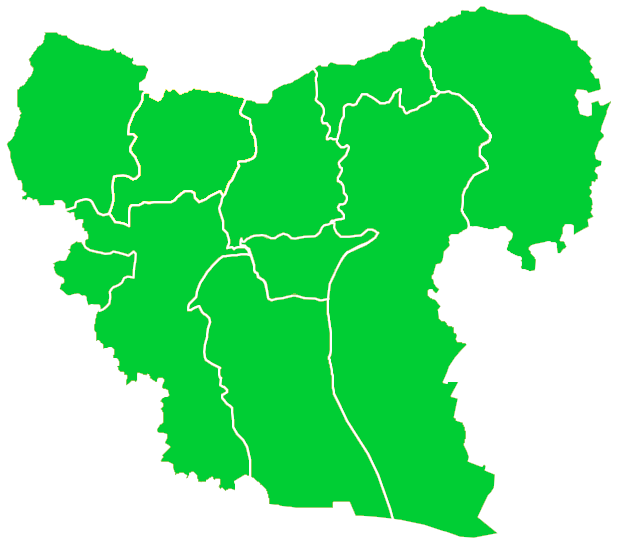

The governorate is divided into ten districts (manatiq) as of 2011. The districts are further divided into 46 sub-districts (nawahi):

- Mount Simeon District (7 sub-districts)^{*}
  - Mount Simeon Subdistrict
  - Tell ad-Daman Subdistrict
  - Haritan Subdistrict
  - Darat Izza Subdistrict
  - al-Zirbah Subdistrict
  - Zammar Subdistrict
  - Hadher Subdistrict
- Afrin District (7 sub-districts)
  - Afrin Subdistrict
  - Bulbul Subdistrict
  - Jindires Subdistrict
  - Rajo Subdistrict
  - Sharran Subdistrict
  - Shaykh al-Hadid Subdistrict
  - Maabatli Subdistrict
- Atarib District (3 sub-districts)^{**}
  - Atarib Subdistrict
  - Ibbin Samaan Subdistrict
  - Urum al-Kubrah Subdistrict
- Ayn al-Arab District (4 sub-districts)
  - Ayn al-Arab Subdistrict
  - Shuyukh Tahtani Subdistrict
  - Sarrin Subdistrict
  - Al-Jalabiyah Subdistrict
- Azaz District (6 sub-districts)
  - Azaz Subdistrict
  - Akhtarin Subdistrict
  - Tell Rifaat Subdistrict
  - Mare' Subdistrict
  - Nubl Subdistrict
  - Sawran Subdistrict
- Al-Bab District (4 sub-districts)
  - al-Bab Subdistrict
  - Tadef Subdistrict
  - al-Rai Subdistrict
  - Arima Subdistrict
- Dayr Hafir District (3 sub-districts)^{***}
  - Dayr Hafir Subdistrict
  - Rasm Harmil al-Imam Subdistrict
  - Kuweires Sharqi Subdistrict
- Jarabulus District (2 sub-districts)
  - Jarabulus Subdistrict
  - Ghandoura Subdistrict
- Manbij District (5 sub-districts)
  - Manbij Subdistrict
  - Abu Kahf Subdistrict
  - Abu Qilqil Subdistrict
  - al-Khafsah Subdistrict
  - Maskanah Subdistrict
- As-Safira District (5 sub-districts)
  - as-Safira Subdistrict
  - Tell Aran Subdistrict
  - Khanasir Subdistrict
  - Banan Subdistrict
  - al-Hajib Subdistrict

^{*} - includes Aleppo City
^{**} - a newly created district since 2008, formerly belonging to Mount Simeon District
^{***} - a newly created district since 2009, formerly belonging to Al-Bab District.

=== Climate ===
Aleppo Governorate has a semi-arid climate. The mountain series that runs along the Mediterranean coast, namely Mount Alawites and Mount Amanus, largely block the effects of the Mediterranean on climate (rain shadow effect). The average temperature in the governorate is 15–20 °C (59–68 °F). The average precipitation ranges from 500 mm (20 in) in the western parts of the governorate to 200 mm (8 in) in the easternmost parts and 150 mm (6 in) in the southeastern desert. 80% of precipitation occurs between October and March. Snow is usually in winter. The average humidity is 60% in the west and 55% in the east.

Climate data for Aleppo (1946–2004)
Month	Jan	Feb	Mar	Apr	May	Jun	Jul	Aug	Sep	Oct	Nov	Dec	Year
Record high °C (°F)	17 (63)	21 (70)	31 (88)	34 (93)	41 (106)	47 (117)	46 (115)	43 (109)	41 (106)	37 (99)	30 (86)	18 (64)	47 (117)
Mean daily maximum °C (°F)	10.3 (50.5)	12.6 (54.7)	16.9 (62.4)	22.6 (72.7)	28.7 (83.7)	33.6 (92.5)	36.2 (97.2)	36.1 (97.0)	33.2 (91.8)	27.0 (80.6)	16.8 (62.2)	11.9 (53.4)	23.8 (74.9)
Daily mean °C (°F)	5.6 (42.1)	7.4 (45.3)	11.0 (51.8)	15.8 (60.4)	21.1 (70.0)	25.8 (78.4)	28.3 (82.9)	28.1 (82.6)	25.2 (77.4)	19.4 (66.9)	12.3 (54.1)	7.3 (45.1)	17.3 (63.1)
Mean daily minimum °C (°F)	1.7 (35.1)	2.4 (36.3)	5.0 (41.0)	8.9 (48.0)	13.5 (56.3)	18.1 (64.6)	20.9 (69.6)	20.9 (69.6)	17.3 (63.1)	12.4 (54.3)	6.4 (43.5)	3.3 (37.9)	10.9 (51.6)
Record low °C (°F)	−13 (9)	−10 (14)	−7 (19)	−2 (28)	0 (32)	9 (48)	16 (61)	15 (59)	7 (45)	5 (41)	−3 (27)	−8 (18)	−13 (9)
Average precipitation mm (inches)	60.3 (2.37)	52.0 (2.05)	46.1 (1.81)	33.6 (1.32)	17.9 (0.70)	2.3 (0.09)	0.1 (0.00)	0.3 (0.01)	2.2 (0.09)	19.2 (0.76)	35.2 (1.39)	59.6 (2.35)	328.8 (12.94)
Average precipitation days (≥ 0.1 mm)	13	14	10	7	4	1	0	0	1	4	7	11	72
Mean monthly sunshine hours	120.9	140.0	198.4	243.0	319.3	366.0	387.5	365.8	303.0	244.9	186.0	127.1	3,001.9
Source 1: World Meteorological Organization, Hong Kong Observatory (sun 1961–1990)
Source 2: BBC Weather (record highs and lows)

== Economy ==
Agricultural output from Aleppo mainly focuses on cereal and cotton production. However, since the Syrian civil war, many Aleppo based commerce have now relocated across the border into Turkey, especially Gaziantep. Economic conditions have deteriorated in the Aleppo region and have caused prices of goods to rise. The 2022 Russian invasion of Ukraine and reductions in the Euphrates' river water levels are expected to cause a major impact on water and electricity access as well as food security within the region.

== Population ==
Historical population
Year	Pop.	±%
2004	4,045,200	—
2011	4,867,900	+20.3%
2018	4,600,166	−5.5%

As per the 2004 Syrian census, the population was 4,045,200. A 2011 UNOCHA estimate put the population at 4,867,900, though this has likely changed since the start of the war.
