= List of mountains in Syria =

The Mountains are listed by height and then by region.

== By Height ==
1	Mount Hermon	9,232 feet
2	Wadi Hajar	8,537 feet
3	Chaghour ed Dahab	8,400 feet
4	Tal'at Musa	8,208 feet
5	Jabal Abu Baruh	8,170 feet
6	Jabal al Ithnayn	7,898 feet
7	Qornet el Boustane	7,780 feet
8	Jabal Halimah	7,766 feet
9	Ar Rajur	7,745 feet
10	Shaqif	7,732 feet

== Aleppo ==
- Mount Barṣa
- Mount Ḥaṣṣ
- Mount Kurd
- Mount Simeon

== Al-Hasakah ==
- Mount Abdulaziz
- Sinjar Mountains (the western part of the mountain range)

== Deir ez-Zor ==
- Jebel Bishri
- Jabal Turdah (alternatively, Turdah mountains)

== Idlib ==
- Mount Ḥārim
- Mount Zāwiya

== Latakia ==
- Mount Alawites
- Mount Aqraʻ
- Turkmen Mountain

== Rif Dimashq ==
- Anti-Lebanon Mountains
- Mount Qasioun

== Qunaytira ==
- Mount Hermon
- Mountains in the Golan Heights

== Suwayda ==
- Mount Druze

== Hama ==
- Jabal al-Fawwar
- Jabal al-Kana'is
- Jabal Kafraa
- Jabal Sha'ir
- Jabal Zayn al-Abidin
- Kafraa
- Maarin al-Jabal
- Zayn al-Abidin
