= Antigoneia (Syria) =

Ancient Greek city in the Seleucid Empire

Antigonia
- Interactive map of Antigonia
- Periods: Hellenistic

History
- Built: 307 BC
- Built by: Antigonus I Monophthalmus
- Abandoned: after 53 BC

Antigoneia (Ancient Greek: Ἀντιγόνεια, also transliterated as Antigonea and Antigonia) was an ancient city founded in 307 BC by Antigonus I Monophthalmus, one of the successors of Alexander the Great, in the northern Levant. Established as a joint capital of Antigonus's empire alongside Celaenae in Anatolia, Antigoneia occupied a strategically important position on the Orontes River and on trade routes. A large settlement with a perimeter of seventy stades—7.5 miles (12 km)—and a population well over 20,000, Antigoneia was the site of several important events of Antigonus's reign.

However, following Antigonus's death in the 301 BC Battle of Ipsus, Antigoneia's prominence abruptly ended, as his rival Seleucus I took control of the region. Seleucus ensured Antigoneia's erasure by transferring its population to his own foundations at Seleucia Pieria and Antioch; he is alleged to have destroyed the city itself, but one source attests that it existed as late as 53 BC. Its exact location is unknown.

== Founding ==
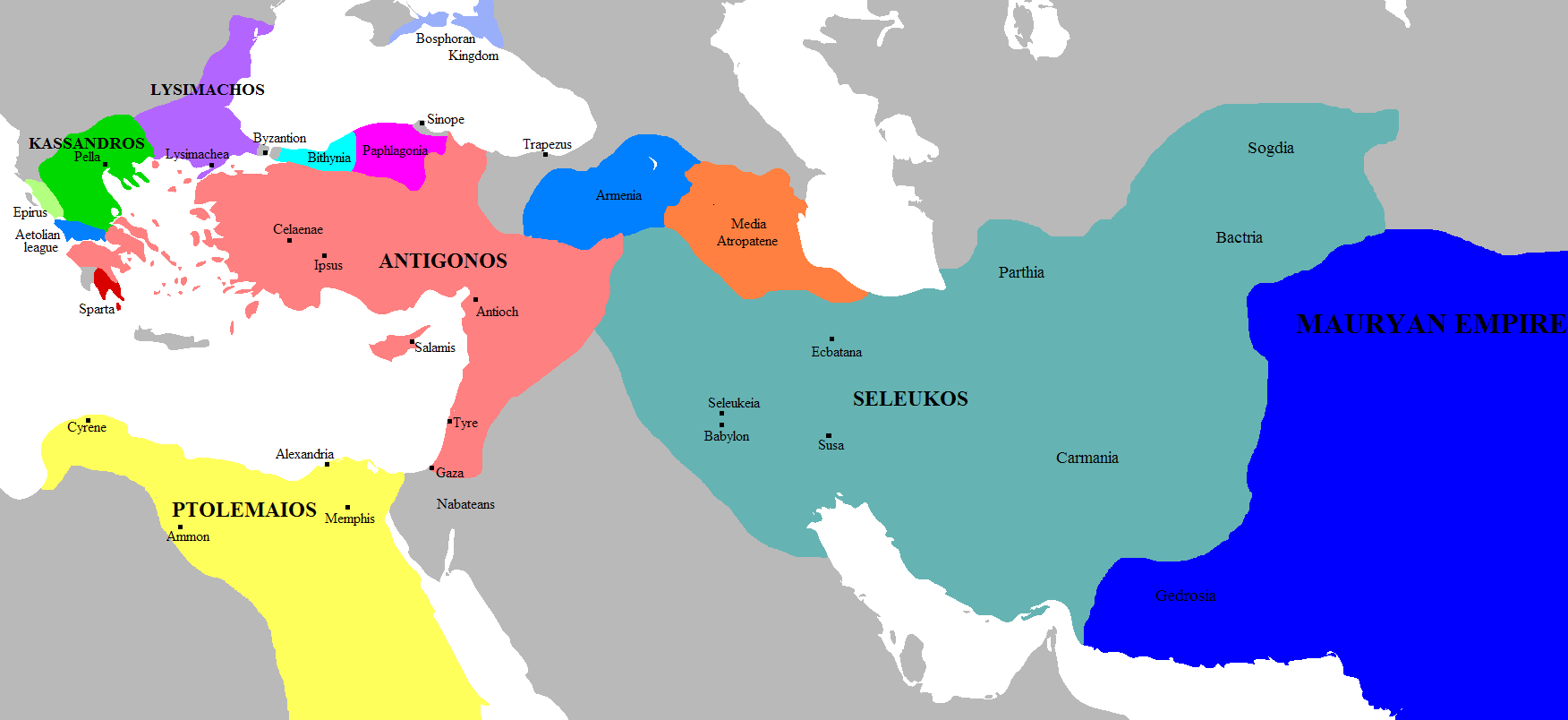
A map of the territories of the Diadochi, c. 303 BC

The death of Alexander the Great in 323 BC precipitated the division of the territories he had conquered amongst his leading generals, termed Diadochi (lit. 'successors'). A series of wars soon broke out among them; a peace treaty signed in late 311 recognised the 71-year-old diadochos Antigonus I Monophthalmus as ruler of Anatolia (then called "Asia"), in addition to Syria and Palestine. His authority over the region was however not recognised by his rival Seleucus I, who ruled the eastern provinces of the Macedonian Empire up to Mesopotamia.

The initial primary city of Antigonus's territories was Celaenae in Phrygia, situated at the crossroads of east-west and north-south roads and thus very suitable to control Anatolia. In 306, he founded Antigoneia Orontes River to take on a similar position for his Syrian territories. Like Celaenae, Antigoneia's location was strategically suitable, as it controlled the Orontes valley and thus the main trade routes from Syria to Anatolia, to Palestine, and to Mesopotamia and the east. Antigonus had previously, in around 314 BC, founded a port city around the future site of Seleucia Pieria nearby; his naming of Antigoneia, however, indicates that he intended it to take precedence. The historian Richard Billows emphasises that Antigoneia did not replace Celaenae as a sole capital city—that designation being anachronistically modern—but instead functioned as an administrative centre for Antigonus's eastern territories. Billows compares the arrangement to the later Seleucid Empire's dual use of nearby Antioch and Seleucia-on-the-Tigris in Mesopotamia as administrative centres.

== Zenith ==
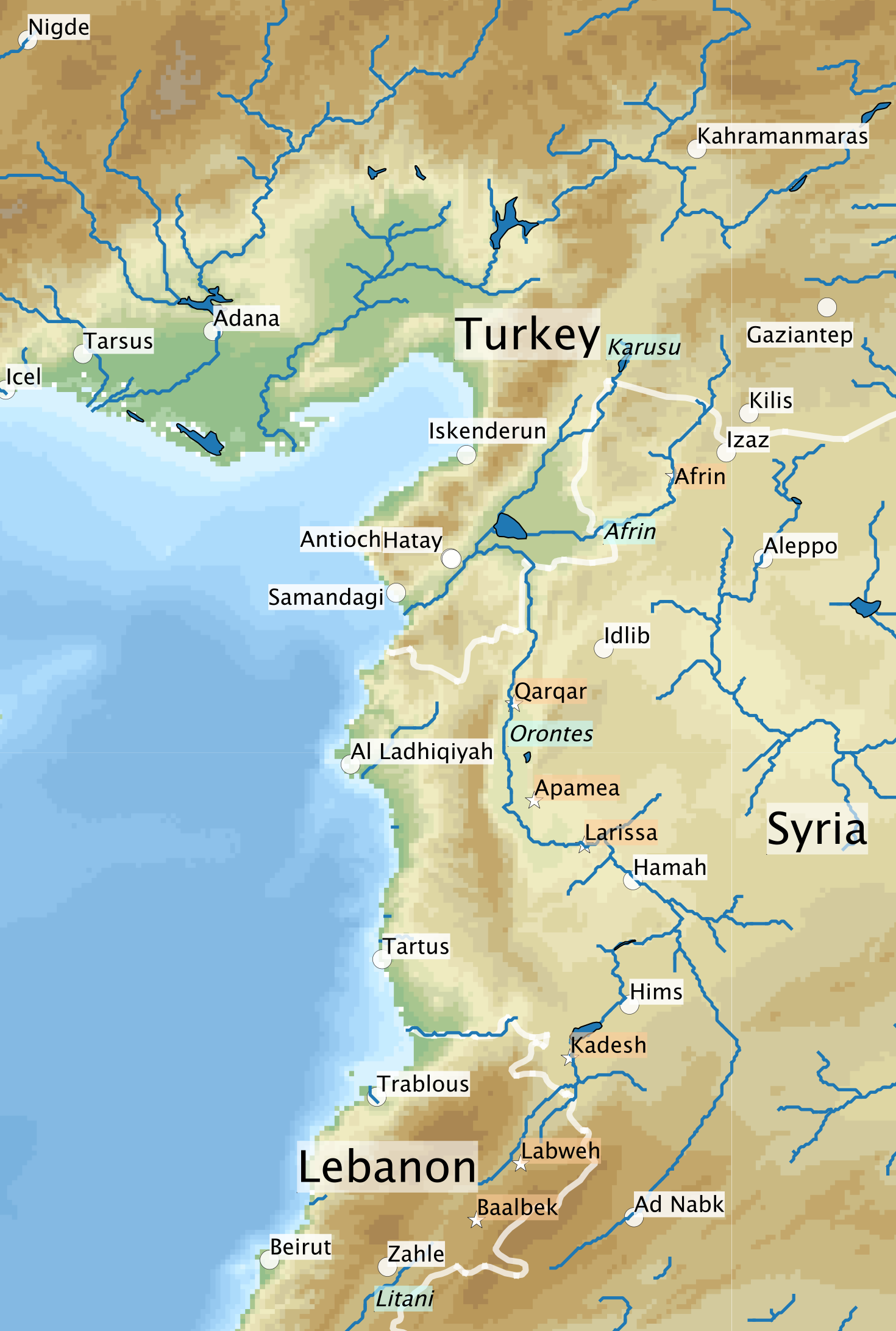
The course of the Orontes River; Antigoneia was likely located near Antioch/Hatay, where the river bends from flowing northwards to south-west.

The location of Antigoneia, said to have been founded on the bend of the Orontes in Syria, has been the subject of some debate. Paul Jacquot, a French military officer writing in 1931, identified a potential location on the left bank of the Orontes. Endorsed by the later historians Glanville Downey and Billows, this site is located on a 3-by-4-kilometre (1.9 by 2.5 mi) plateau 8 kilometres (5.0 mi) northeast of Antioch, sometimes called "the tell of Sheikh Hassan". Bounded on all sides by water—the Lake of Antioch to the north, the Orontes to the east and south, and the Kara Su river to the west—the site was called "admirably suited for defense" by Downey. However, based upon an intensive study of the region by the Amuq Valley Regional Project, the archaeologist Andrea U. De Giorgi notes that there is no material evidence for this theory, and concludes that the plateau cannot be identified as the site of Antigoneia.

Antigoneia was the earliest major Hellenistic period foundation in Syria. The ancient historian Diodorus Siculus reports that Antigoneia had a perimeter of seventy stades, or 7.5 miles (12 km)). As the number of adult male colonists later transferred to Antioch was 5,300, Billows estimates Antigoneia's total Greco-Macedonian population (including women and children) at 20,000. This figure does not include indigenous Asians or slaves. Billows has deduced that Athens sent a draft of colonists to help settle Antigoneia. It has been suggested that a mint was founded there, but this is considered unlikely.

Events that took place at Antigoneia included: the senior advisor Aristodemus of Miletus's staged acclamation of Antigonus as king, following the Battle of Salamis in early 306, and Antigonus's subsequent coronation in the royal palace; the burial of his younger son Philip in late 306, shortly before Antigonus led forth an army to invade Egypt; and a grand festival planned for 302, intended to include theatre and sporting competitions, which was abruptly cancelled when the diadochus Lysimachus invaded Phrygia. After compensating the entrants with a total of 200 gold talents, (Note: 1,000 talents was enough to raise a mercenary army in Greece, while the campaign that led to Antigonus's death at Ipsus in 301 BC cost an additional 3,000. Antigonus's total wealth has been estimated at 35,000 talents, a huge figure amassed through his conquests and an annual revenue of 11,000 talents, but set against a vast amount of expenditure, such as maintaining an army of 120,000 troops, a strong navy, and a luxurious court.) Antigonus set out to confront Lysimachus and his ally Seleucus, but they defeated his army and killed him at the decisive Battle of Ipsus in 301 BC.

== Fall ==
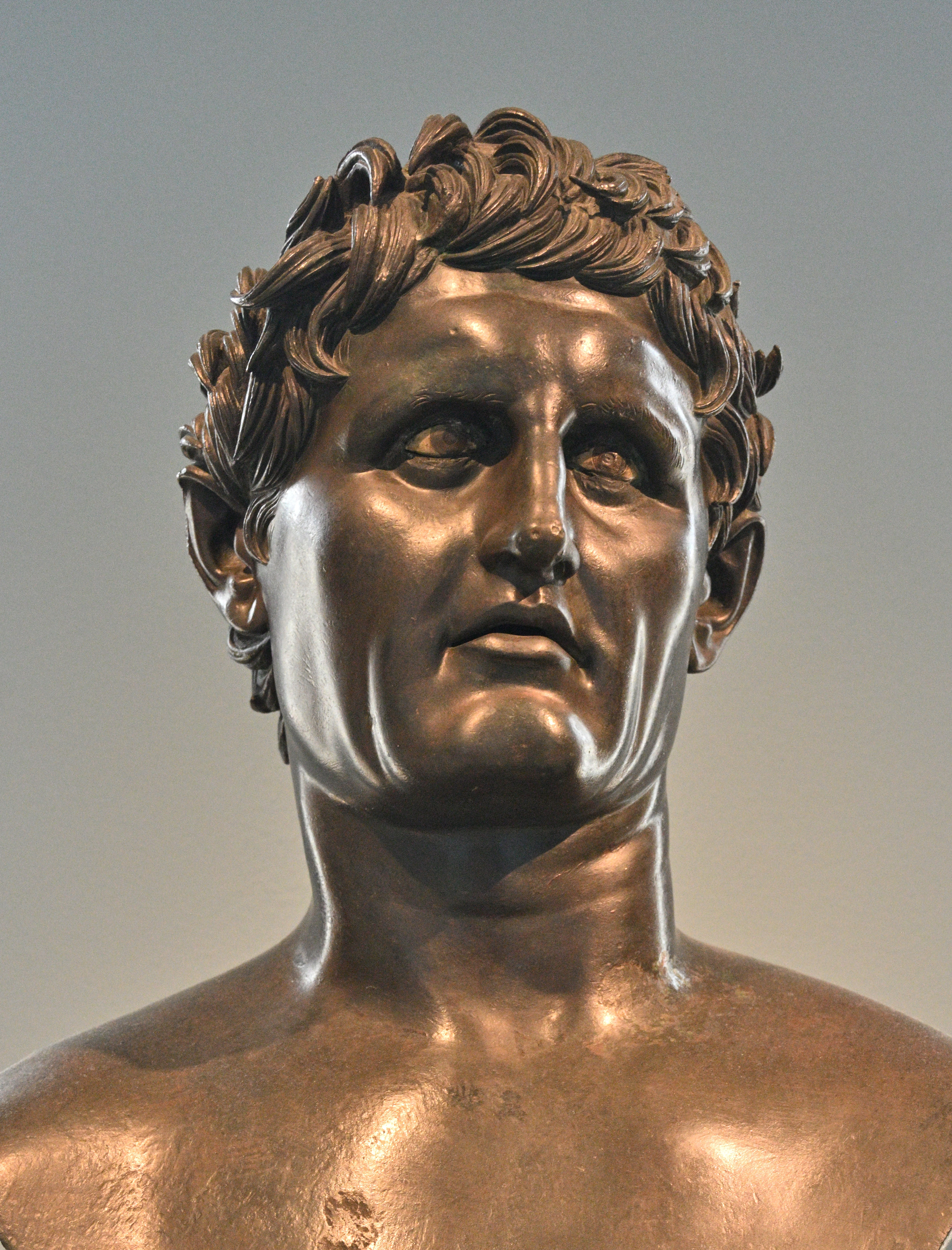
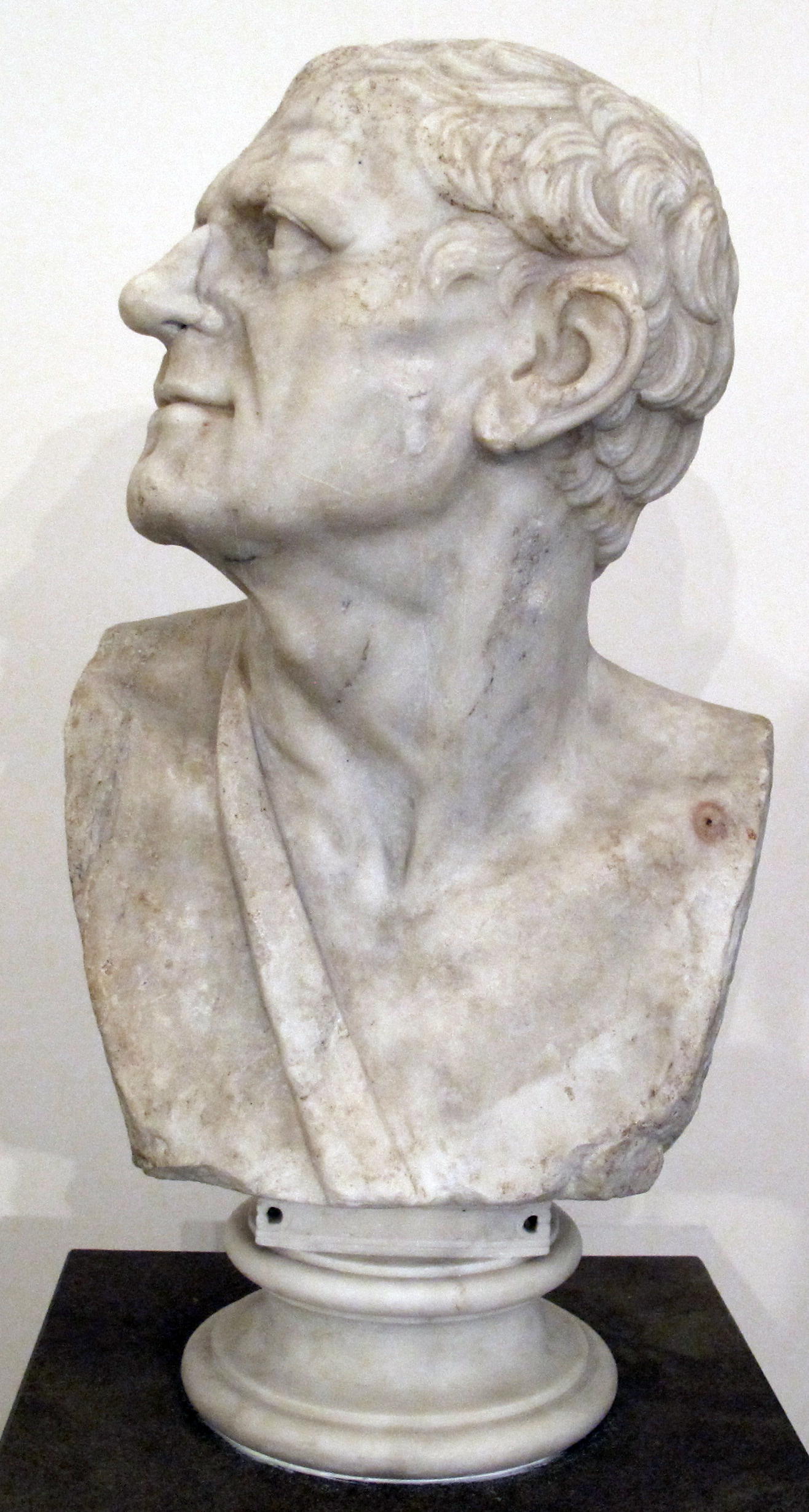
Busts of Seleucus (left) and Lysimachus, whose joint victory in 301 BC at Ipsus led to Antigoneia's downfall

After Ipsus, Antigonus's territories were divided between Lysimachus and Seleucus. Antigoneia and the rest of Syria fell to Seleucus, who decided, like his predecessor, to secure control over the important region through settlement foundation. It was natural that occupying Antigoneia would not fully suit his purposes—destroying it and founding a new city would be far more prestigious. Seleucus may have considered his defeated enemy's choice of location inferior to his own at Antioch, which likely had a superior water supply, was situated in fertile lands, and was closer to the sea. Legends of Antioch's foundation record that in 300 BC Seleucus performed a sacrifice at Antigoneia for a sign from Zeus as to whether he should occupy and change the city's name, or found a replacement; an eagle carried the sacrificial meat to Antioch, indicating the latter.

Strabo, who described Antioch in detail in his Geographica (finished c. 23 AD), Libanius, a 4th-century rhetorician from Antioch, and John Malalas, whose sixth-century Chronographia provides a detailed but problematic history of the city, all "indicate that Seleucus destroyed or depopulated Antigoneia in order to populate Antioch", in Cohen's words. Libanius suggests that the very stones used to build Antigoneia were transported to help build Antioch; this is unlikely, as the latter was located at a considerable distance and had stone quarries nearby. Many of Antigoneia's population were likely relocated to Seleucia Pieria, which Seleucus intended to be his western capital, although the Antiochene writers Libanius and Malalas omit this information, preferring to only state that many were settled at Antioch. This displacement included 5,300 Athenian and Macedonian colonists, who, Billows deduced, must have come from Antigoneia.

Although Diodorus Siculus reports that Antigoneia was destroyed by Seleucus, the later Roman historian Cassius Dio records that it still existed during the early Roman–Parthian Wars in 53 BC. Dio states that the Parthians were unable to capture the settlement because of the density of its surrounding woods. Cohen suggests three theories to explain Antigoneia's continued existence: it was indeed destroyed but then later rebuilt; it was only partially destroyed; or it was symbolically destroyed as an independent city but administratively incorporated as a district of Antioch.
