= Kurd Mountain =

Upland area in Syria and Turkey

- Kurd Dagh
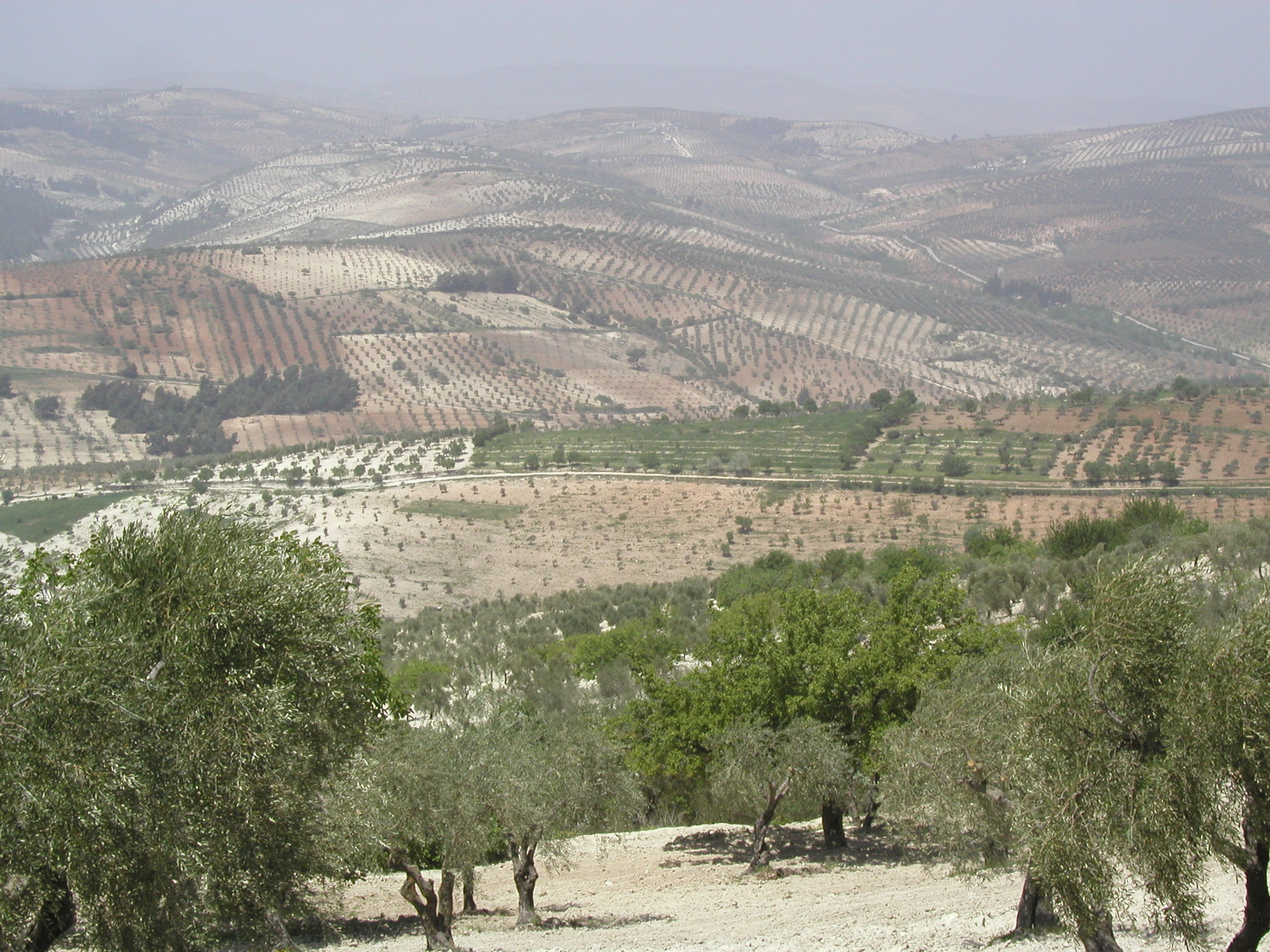
- Hills of the Kurd Mountain in Afrin

Highest point
- Coordinates: 36°40′N 36°46′E

Naming
- Etymology: Named after the Kurmanji-speaking Kurdish population
- Native name: Çîyayê Kurmênc
- English translation: Mountain of the Kurmanj

Geography
- Location within Syria
- Location: Syria: Afrin District; Turkey: Kilis Province
- Countries: Syria; Turkey
- Regions: Aleppo Governorate; Kilis Province
- District: Afrin District
- Settlement: Afrin
- Parent range: Limestone Massif
- Borders on: Aintab plateau, Mount Harim, Mount Amanus, Aleppo plateau

Geology
- Mountain type: Highland
- Rock type: Limestone

Kurd Mountain or Kurd Dagh (Kurdish: Çîyayê Kurmênc; Arabic: جبل الأكراد, romanized: jabal al-ʾakrād; Turkish: Kürt Dağı, officially Kurt Dağı) is a highland region in northwestern Syria and southeastern Turkey. It is located in the Aleppo Governorate of Syria and Kilis Province of Turkey. The Kurd Mountain should not be confused with the neighboring Jabal al-Akrad, which is located further southwest in Latakia Governorate.

== Location and description ==
Kurd Mountain is a part of the Limestone Massif of northwestern Syria. The mountain is a southern continuation into the Aleppo plateau of the highlands on the western part of the Aintab plateau. The valley of River Afrin surrounds Kurd Mountain from east and south and separates it from the plain of Aʻzāz and Mount Simeon to the east, and from Mount Harim to the south. The valley of River Aswad separates Mount Kurd from Mount Amanus to the west.

The main town is Afrin (Efrîn in Kurdish), in Syria. The area is known for its olive growing and charcoal production.

== Demographics ==
The district (Kaza) of Kurd Dagh had a population of 21,823 in the census of the State of Aleppo in 1922.

| Male | Female | Total |
|---|---|---|
| 10,434 | 11,389 | 21,823 |

When the Kurd Dagh was governed by the French, several Kurdish tribes were living in the area. From the 1800s onwards, several group of Kurds have migrated from the Kurd Dagh to Aleppo. In the 1930s, Kurdish Alevis fled persecution by the Turkish Armed Forces during the Dersim Massacre, settling in Mabeta.

=== Religion ===
The majority of the Kurd-Dagh population are Sunni Hanafi-Muslims, while most Syrian Kurds are Sunni Shafiite-Muslims. Yazidis also have a presence in the region.

There used to be a Sufi community before the Syrian Civil War.

== Etymology ==
Kurd Mountain is known locally as Çîyayê Kurmênc meaning “Mountain of the Kurmanj”, where Kurmanj means Kurdish speakers of Kurmanji (spoken in the region), which is one of the dialects of the Kurdish language.

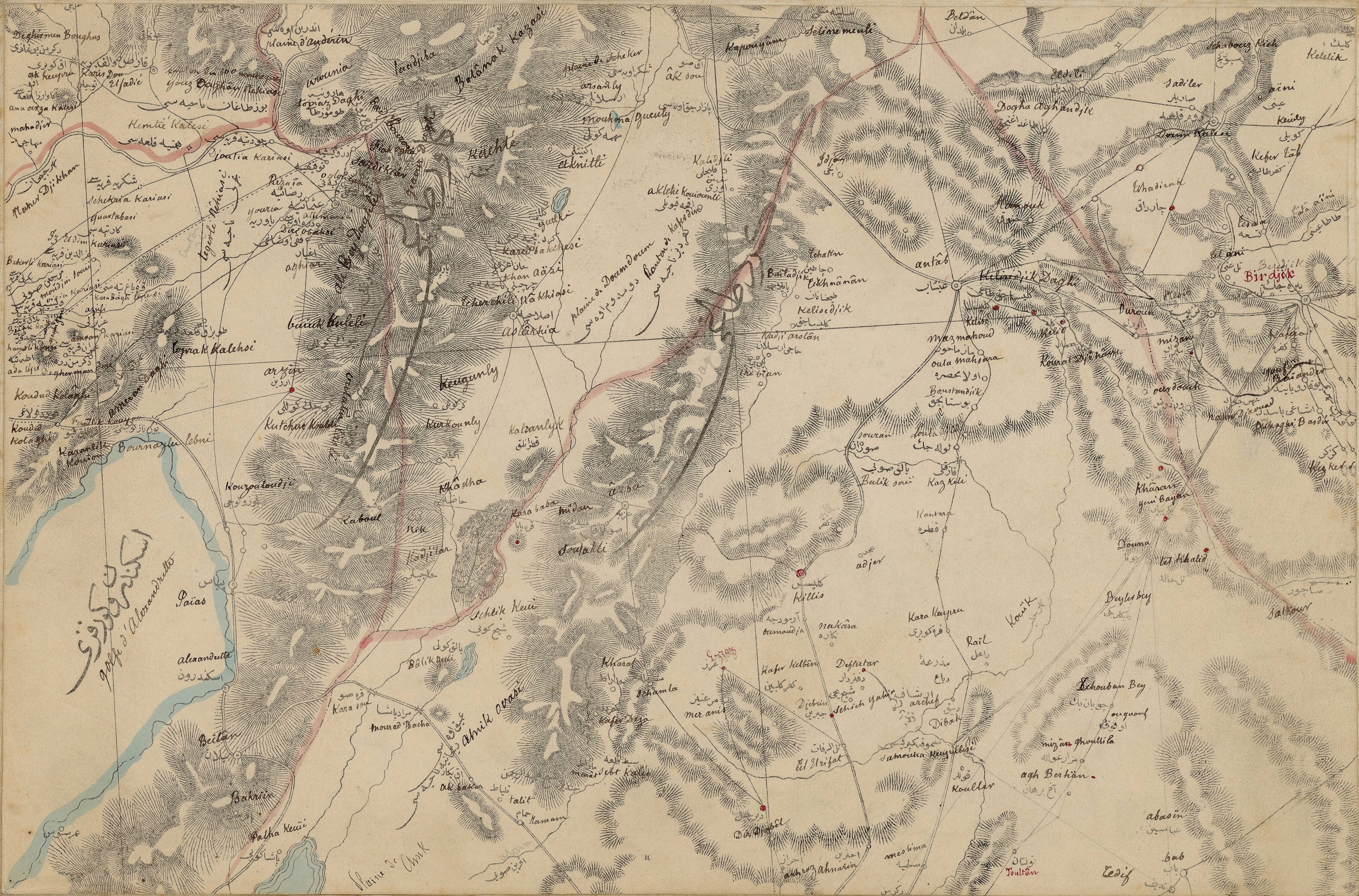
map of the Ottoman Vilayet of Aleppo showing Kurd Dagh under name of كرد طاغى, Kurd Dağ.

The name of the mountain was mentioned in Arabic sources as Jabal al-Akrad meaning “Kurd mountain”, then with the rule of the Ottoman Empire the name was translated into the Ottoman Turkish to كرد طاغ (Kurd Dağ) in the sense of "Kurd Mountain" derived from the Turkish word طاغ - Dağ, which means Mountain. The form Kurd Dagh was used in the official Ottoman documents and remained in official circulation during the French era until the end of the first decade of Syria's independence, until the Syrian government adopted the form Jabal al-Akrad again. However, in the years of unity between Egypt and Syria, the name of Jabal al-Akrad was removed. And in 1977 the mountain was renamed to جبل العروبة Jabal al-`Uruba meaning “Mountain of Arabism” in accordance with decree 15801, which banned Kurdish names. And then it was renamed "Mount Aleppo" and the name Jabal al-Akrad remained circulating in textbooks as a geographical name.

Jabal al-Akrad was attested in the book of Dhikrayati ean bilad 'alf laylat walayla of the French commercial attaché in Aleppo between the years 1548-1556, as well as in Konstantin Bazili's book, Syria and Palestine Under Ottoman Rule (1861) on the events of the end of Ibrahim Pasha's occupation of the areas of Kurd Mountain.

The Turkish part was renamed officially as Kurt Dağı ('Wolf Mountain'), with a pun on the Turkish words Kürt ('Kurd') and kurt ('wolf').

== See also ==
- Yazidism in Syria
- Yazidism in Turkey
