= Aintab plateau =

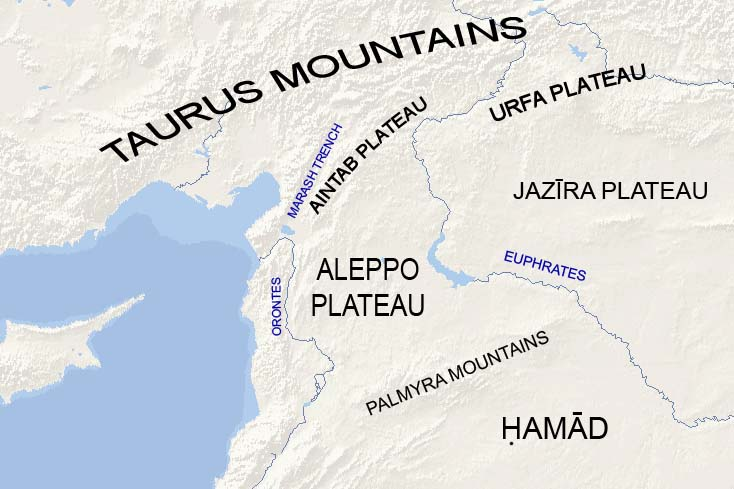
Aintab plateau

Aintab plateau or Gaziantep plateau (Arabic: هضبة عنتاب Levantine pronunciation: [ˈhɑdˤɑbet ʕɪnˈtaːb]) is the westernmost part of Turkey's Southeastern Anatolia Region. It forms the northwestern end of the Arabian plate where it meets the Anatolian sub-plate at the East Anatolian Fault. The plateau lies in the Turkish provinces of Gaziantep, Kilis, and Adıyaman. It is a low, gently undulating plateau. In antiquity, this was the region of Commagene. Gaziantep (Aintab) is located nearly in the south-center of the plateau.

== Geography ==
The plateau's average elevation is 800 meters, with peaks over 1000 m to the north-northwest and 375–600 m plains towards the south and east. The plateau forms the northernmost part of the Syria geographic region. The Aintab plateau is a continuation of the Aleppo plateau that slopes gently upward in a southeast–northwest direction, and then rises, forming the Aintab plateau approximately midway between Aleppo and Gaziantep. Mount Kurd, Mount Simeon, and Mount ʻAqīl are extensions of Aintab plateau into Aleppo plateau.

Aintab plateau is bounded from the east by the valley of the Euphrates River and the Manbij plain, and from the north by the Taurus Mountains. The Maraş triple junction forms the western boundary—a valley that runs from Maraş to Antakya separating the Nur Mountains and Sof (Qarṭal) Mountains. The river ʼAswad (Kara-su) runs in the southern half of the valley.

The plateau slopes up in a south–north and southeast–northwest direction. Its eastern part is occupied by the plains of Tall Bashar (Oğuzeli), Yavuzeli, and Araban in Gaziantep Province. The western part holds Sof mountain (1,496 m) and Karadağ mountain (1,081 m).

The Alleben and Sajur rivers rise from Sof Mountain and flow southeast to the Euphrates across the plain of Tall Bashar. The Nizip Stream rises from Nizip and joins the Euphrates near the city. The Merzimen (Bozatlı) river rises from Sof Mountain, flows through the southern part of the Yavuzeli Plain, and joins the Euphrates. The Kara-su runs through the Araban Plain and joins the Euphrates. River Afrin rises from the Sof Mountain and flows south in the west of the plateau. River Quweiq used to rise from the southern Aintab plateau.

In the northern Adıyaman Province, the southern terrain along the Euphrates consists of highlands separated by rivers flowing down from the foothills of the steep Taurus Mountains into the Euphrates. These rivers include the Kahta, Göksu, Sofras, and Ziyaret. The plains in this portion of the plateau make up 10% of the total area. They are usually situated along the rivers and lie, on average, between 600 and 700 m above sea level. The Malatya Mountains are foothills of the Taurus Mountains and dominate the northern portion of Adıyaman Province. They increase towards the north. Their highest peaks are the Akdag (2552 m), Dibek (2549 m), Tucak (2533 m), Gorduk (2206 m), Nemrut (2150 m), Borik (2110 m), Bozdag (1200 m), and Karadag (1115 m).

Forests are scarce on the Aintab plateau. The main trees are pine and oak.
