= Aleppo plateau =

Coordinates: 36°11′12″N 37°8′48″E

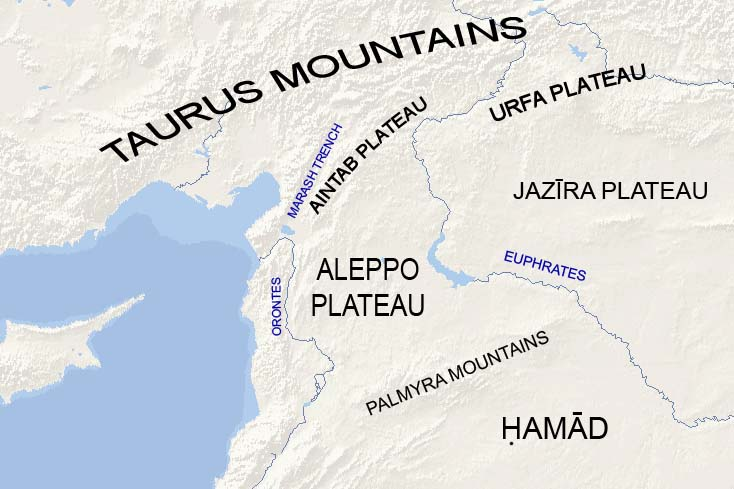
Aleppo plateau

The Aleppo plateau (Arabic: هضبة حلب [ˈhædˤabæt ˈħælæb]) is a low, gently undulating plateau of northern Syria. It lies at the northern end of the junction between the Arabian Plate and the African Plate at the Dead Sea Rift. The plateau lies mostly in the Aleppo Governorate and Idlib Governorate. Aleppo is located in the north-center of the plateau.

== Boundaries ==
The Aleppo plateau lies immediately north of the Palmyra mountain belt. To the east it is bounded by the Euphrates river valley, which separates it from the Jazirah plateau. To the west it is bounded by the northern half of the Dead Sea Rift, namely the Orontes river valley. The Aintab plateau forms a northern continuation of the plateau that leads to the Taurus Mountains.

== Description ==
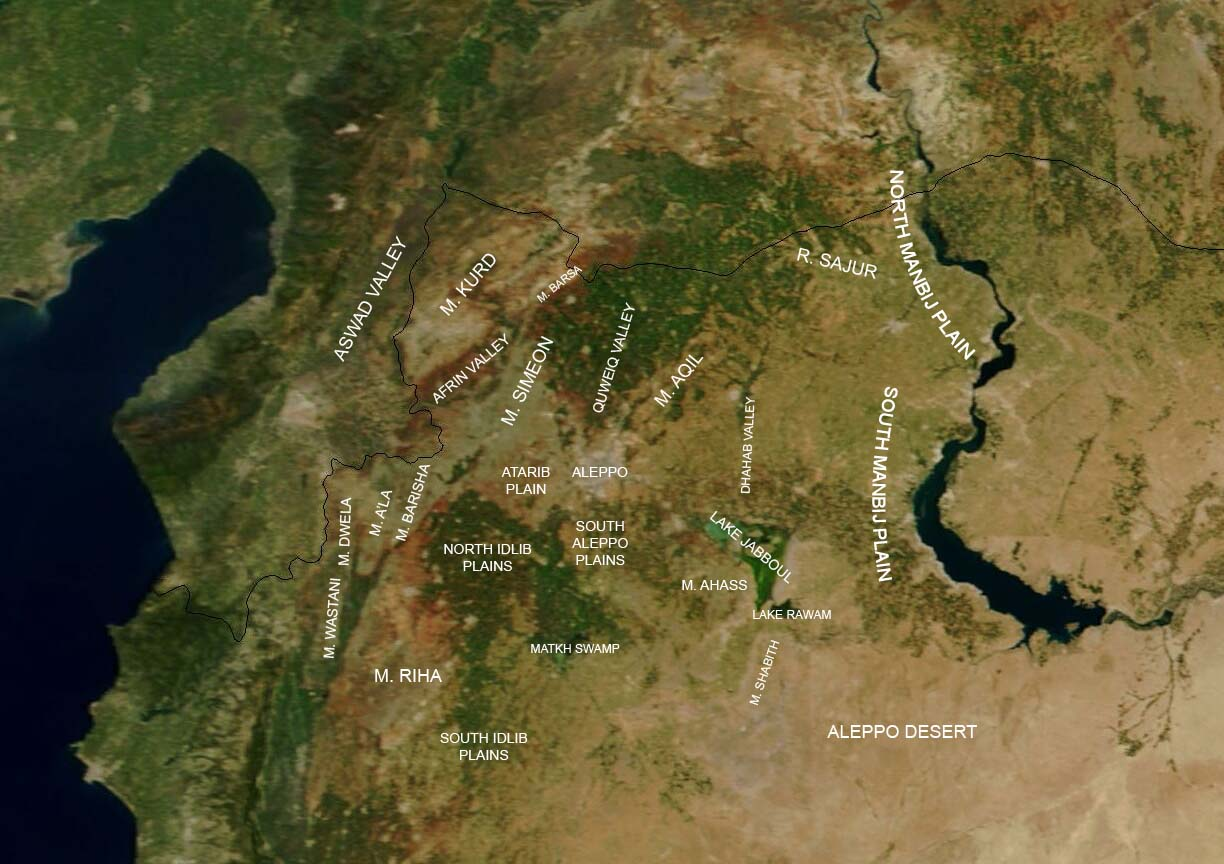
Geographic features on the Aleppo plateau

The average elevation of the plateau is 400 m. The surface gradually slopes down in north-south and west-east directions. The surface undulates gently with an amplitude of 10–30 m for each wave. The lowlands are covered with combined Paleozoic and Mesozoic sediments that average 4–5 km in thickness over the whole surface.

Starting from the valley of the Euphrates, the terrain rises forming the Manbij plain and then sinks again at the Dhahab river valley in the east of Aleppo Governorate. The Dhahab drains the highlands north of Bāb and runs in a north-south direction for about 50 km until it drains into Lake Jabboul. West of the Dhahab valley the terrain rises again forming Mount ʻAqīl (Mount Taymar) (534 m) west of Bāb and Mount Ḥaṣṣ (550 m) west of Lake Jabboul. The terrain sinks again forming the valley of River Quwēq. The endpoint of Quwēq, the Maṭkh swamp (249 m), is the lowest point in Aleppo Governorate. West of the Quwēq is Mount Simeon. South of Mount Simeon are the plains of Idlib. River ʻIfrīn runs west of Mount Simeon. To the west of River ʻIfrīn the land rises again forming Mount Kurd. River ʻIfrīn runs from north to south between Mount Simeon and Mount Kurd and then turns west to the Orontes valley, thus separating Mount Kurd from Mount Ḥārim to the south. Mount Ḥārim is separated from Mount Zāwiya to the south by the Rouj Plain, which leads to the Ghab Plain in the Orontes valley. The highlands of the western Aleppo plateau are collectively known as the Limestone Massif.

The southeastern portion of the plateau is an arid steppe that forms the northern tip of the Syrian Desert. The rest of the plateau is generally fertile, especially the northwest. The plateau is generally deforested except for a dispersed forest of about 50 km^{2} on the eastern slope of Mount Kurd where it faces the plain of Aʻzāz. The main trees in the region are Aleppo pine and oak.

== Geology ==
The isotope composition of the region indicate that there were similarities between the deeper Upper Cretaceous aquifers in both the Aleppo plateau and the Palmyrean mountain zone, but differences with the shallow Paleogene aquifer.

Early–Middle Miocene intraplate basalts obtained from the Aleppo plateau contained low abundances of platinum-group elements compared to alkali basalts from Hawaii, and mid-ocean ridge basalts. However, the Aleppo Plateau and vicinity had two discrete Miocene volcanic phases, ~ 19–18 Ma and ~ 13.5–12 Ma.

== Bibliography ==
- Wagner, Wolfgang (2011). Groundwater in the Arab Middle East. Springer Science & Business Media. ISBN 9783642193514.

== See also ==
- Aleppo Governorate
