= Harim Mountains =

Highlands in the north of Idlib Governorate in northwestern Syria

Highest point
- Peak: Mount Hanash, Mount Wastani
- Elevation: 847 m (2,779 ft)
- Parent peak: Mount A'la

Dimensions
- Length: 40 km (25 mi)
- Area: 600 km^{2} (230 sq mi)

Naming
- Native name: جبال حارم

Geography
- Location: Idlib Governorate, Syria
- Country: Syria

Harim Mountains (Arabic: جبال حارم, romanized: Jibāl Ḥārim [d͡ʒiˈbæːl ˈħaːrim]) are highlands in the north of Idlib Governorate in northwestern Syria. The mountains are located in the Harim and Jisr Shughur districts of Idlib Governorate.

== Location and description ==
The Harim highlands are located between 36◦22′–36◦40′ E and 35◦46′–36◦14′ N on the westernmost part of the Aleppo plateau. They cover about 600 km^{2}. The Orontes River valley forms the western boundary. Al-Ruj Plain (Arabic: سهل الروج) is located to the south. The Ruj plain and the northern Idlib plain run along the eastern boundary. The Dana plain (part of the northern Idlib plain) separates the Harim mountains from Mount Simeon to the northwest. The valley of River Afrin and Lake Amiq surround Harim mountains from north.

The mountains include three massifs:

Mount Halqa (Arabic: جبل حلقة) and Mount Barisha (Arabic: جبل باريشا) form the first massif from the east. Mount Halqa (meaning "circle mountain") refers to low rocky plateaus that surround the Dāna plain. Mount Barisha, which lies west of Halqa, covers about 230 km^{2} and averages 500–600 m in elevation; the highest point is 657 m.

The second massif is Mount A'la (Arabic: جبل الأعلى) (also called Mount Summaq, (Arabic: جبل السماق). This mountain is separated from Mount Barisha by the Shalf plain. The highest point in Mount A'la reaches 819 m. This mountain has a predominantly Druze population.

The third mountain is Mount Wastani (Arabic: جبل الوسطاني). This mountain extends for 40 km from Salqin in the north between the Orontes valley and the Ruj plain. The mountain includes two masses; the northern mass is sometimes considered a separate mountain called Mount Dweli (Arabic: جبل الدويلة). The highest point in Mount Wastani is Mount Hanash (Arabic: جبل الحنش) (847 m).

Olive and oak trees are abundant on Ḥārim mountains. The mountains also have numerous archaeological sites.

After Mount Arba'in was subjected to bombardment by the (United States-led) coalition in 2014, foreign fighters fled to Jabal al-Summaq. Homes of the Druze religious minority of Jabal al-Summaq's Kuku village were forcibly stolen and attacked by Turkistan Islamic Party militant Uyghurs and Uzbeks.

In February 2017 Osama al-Homsi became the Hay'at Tahrir al-Sham commander over an area encompassing Jabal al-Summaq.
