= Limestone Massif =

The Limestone Massif (from French Le Massif Calcaire) or Belus Massif is the highlands on the western part of the Aleppo plateau in northwestern Syria. The massif is famed for having the Dead Cities of Syria.

The massif includes three groups of highlands; the first is the northern group of Mount Simeon and Mount Kurd. The second middle group is the group of Harim Mountains. The third southern group is the group of Zawiya Mountain.

== See also ==
- Aleppo plateau
