= Judaean Mountains =

Mountain range in Israel and Palestine

- Harei Yehuda
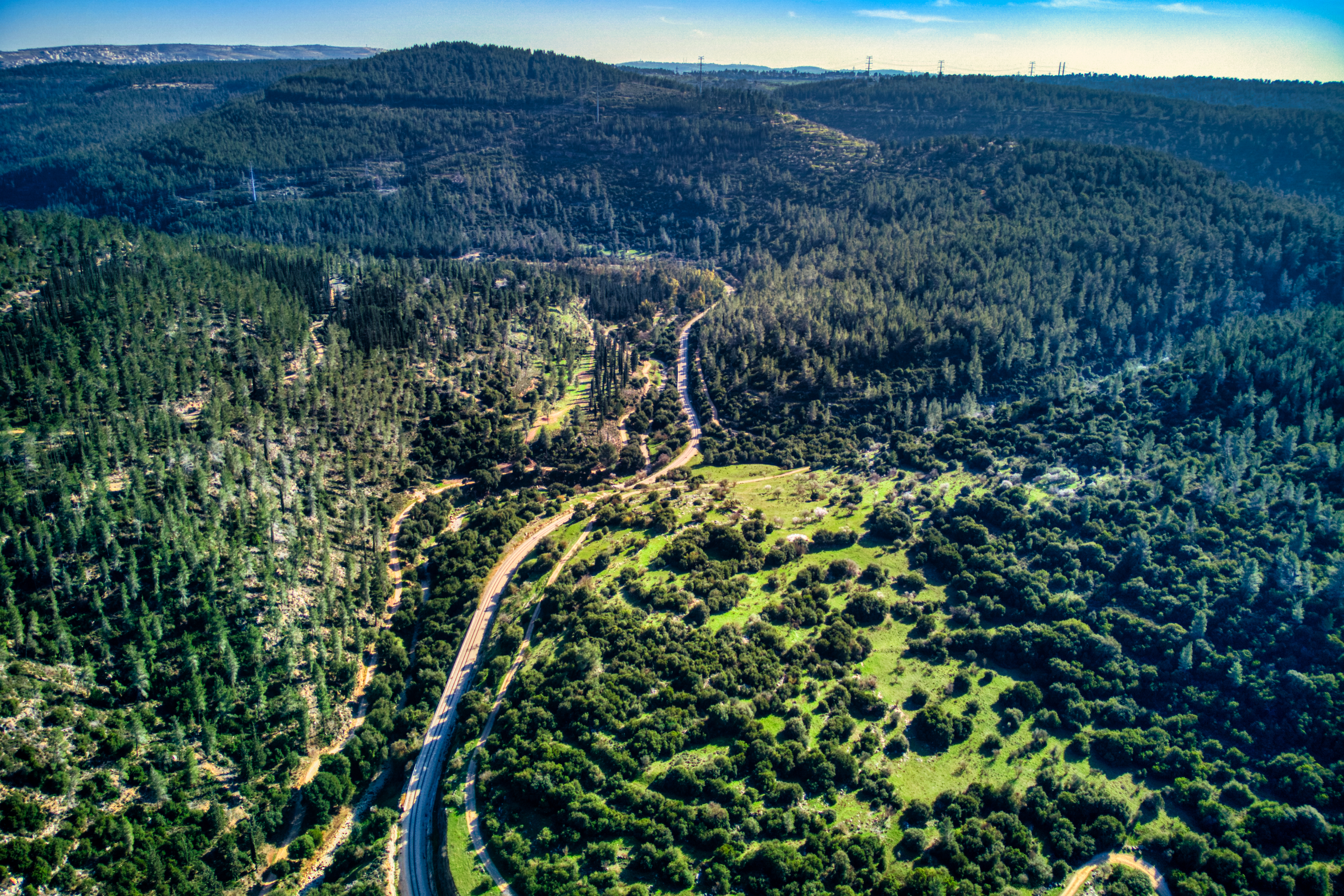
- View of the Judaean Mountains near Jerusalem

Highest point
- Peak: Mount Nabi Yunis (Mount Halhul)
- Elevation: 1,026 m (3,366 ft)
- Coordinates: 31°40′N 35°10′E

Geography
- Location within Israel
- Parent range: Great Rift Valley

Geology
- Rock age: Late Cretaceous
- Rock type(s): Terra rossa, limestone

Climbing
- Easiest route: Road of the Patriarchs (the ridge route)

The Judaean Mountains, or Judaean Hills (Hebrew: הרי יהודה, romanized: Harei Yehuda) or the Hebron Hills (Arabic: تلال الخليل, romanized: Tilāl Al-ḵalīl or Arabic: جبال الخليل, romanized: Jibāl Al-ḵalīl, lit. 'Hebron Mountains',) is a mountain range in the West Bank of Palestine, and Israel where Jerusalem, Bethlehem, Hebron and several other biblical sites are located. The mountains reach a height of 1,026 metres (3,366 ft). The Judean Mountains can be divided into a number of sub-regions, including the Mount Hebron ridge, the Jerusalem ridge and the Judean slopes.

The Judaean Mountains formed the heartland of the Kingdom of Judah (930–586 BCE), where the earliest Jewish settlements emerged, and from which Jews are originally descended.

== Geography ==
The Judaean Mountains are part of a more extended range that runs in a north–south direction. The ridge consists of the Samarian Hills in its northern part, and of the Judaean Mountains in its southern part, the two segments meeting at the latitude of Ramallah. The westward descent from the hard limestone country of the Judaean Mountains towards the coastal plain is by way of a longitudinal trough of fosse cut through chalk, followed by the low, rolling soft limestone hills of the Shephelah, while eastwards the landscape falls steeply towards the Jordan Rift Valley. The southern end of the mountain range is at Beersheba in the northern part of the Negev, where the mountains slope down into the Beersheba-Arad valley. The average height of the Judaean Mountains is of 900 metres (2,953 ft), and they encompass the cities of Ramallah, Jerusalem, Bethlehem and Hebron. The northern section of the Judaean Mountains is referred to as Jerusalem Hills, and the southern one as Hebron Hills.

The Judaean Mountains were heavily forested in antiquity. The range is mostly composed of terra rossa soils over hard limestones.

== Geology and palaeontology ==
The Judaean Mountains are the surface expression of a series of monoclinic folds which trend north-northwest through Israel. The folding is the central expression of the Syrian Arc belt of anticlinal folding that began in the Late Cretaceous Period in northeast Africa and southwest Asia. The Syrian Arc extends east-northeast across the Sinai, turns north-northeast through Israel and continues the east-northeast trend into Syria. The Israeli segment parallels the Dead Sea Transform which lies just to the east. The uplift events that created the mountain occurred in two phases one in the Late Eocene-Early Oligocene and second in the Early Miocene.

In prehistoric times, animals no longer found elsewhere in the Levant region were found here, including elephants, rhinoceroses, giraffes and wild Asian water buffalo.

The range has karst topography including a stalactite cave in Nahal Sorek National Park between Jerusalem and Beit Shemesh and the area surrounding Ofra, where fossils of prehistoric flora and fauna were found.

== In the Hebrew Bible ==
According to the Hebrew Bible, the Judaean Mountains were the allotment of the Tribe of Judah and the heartland of the former Kingdom of Judah. The book of Joshua describes the territorial boundaries in detail, with Joshua 15:8 referencing the border ascending "to the top of the mountain that lies before the valley of Hinnom westward" near Jerusalem, while Joshua 15:48–60 lists cities that the text places "in the mountain" (Hebrew: בָהָר), including Hebron and other settlements within what the text describes as the hill country.

== Transportation ==
The main freeway between Tel Aviv and Jerusalem, which further extends to the Jordan Valley as a regular road. Highway 1, passes through the Judaean Mountains, between Beit Shemesh and Jerusalem.

An Israel Railways line, Jaffa-Jerusalem railway, runs from Beit Shemesh along the Brook of Sorek and Valley of Rephaim to the Jerusalem Malha Train Station. The line has since been largely replaced by the Tel Aviv-Jerusalem railway, which utilizes tunnels and bridges through the Judaean Mountains, runs up to 160 km/h (99 mph) between Ben Gurion Airport and Jerusalem-Yitzhak Navon railway station.

== Winemaking ==
The Judaean Mountains have been associated with winemaking for thousands of years, as evidenced by the abundance of ancient winepresses, references to viticulture in ancient texts like the Hebrew Bible, and archaeological findings such as the Arad ostraca, written by Judahite soldiers in the late 7th century BCE. Nevertheless, with the Muslim conquest of the Levant in the 7th century, and particularly during the later Mamluk rule in the Middle Ages, a significant decline in winemaking activities occurred, ultimately leading to a complete prohibition of winemaking. In the 1980s, the Judaean Mountains witnessed a notable resurgence in winemaking, driven by Israeli entrepreneurs. Today, the area is renowned for its boutique wineries. This region's combination of Mediterranean microclimates, terra rossa clay soil, and high-altitude vineyards has also propelled it into the spotlight as a burgeoning center for quality wine production. In recent decades, wines originating from this area have garnered international recognition.

In August 2020, the Judean Hills region in Israel received the country's first official wine appellation.

== Gallery ==
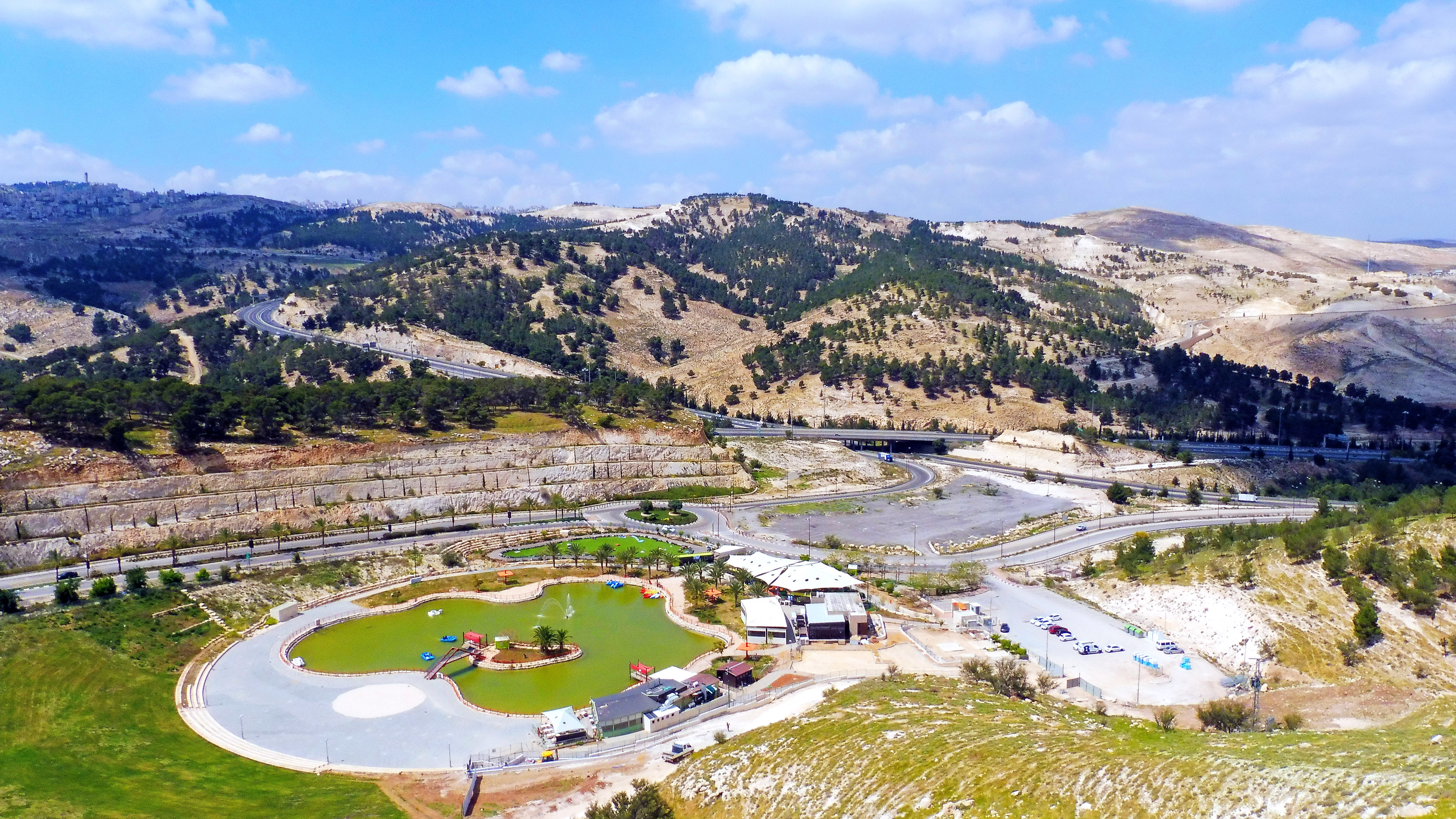
The Judaean Mountains between Jerusalem and Ma'ale Adumim

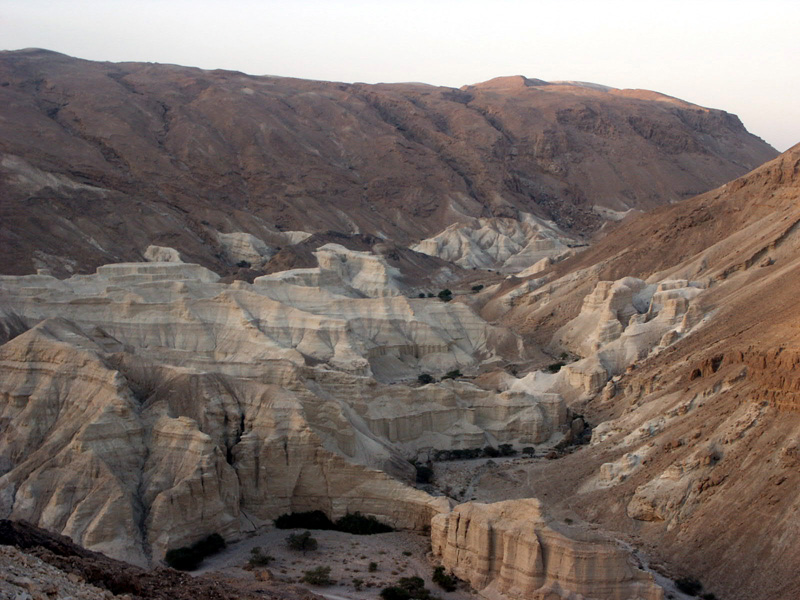
The Judean Hills viewed from the Dead Sea

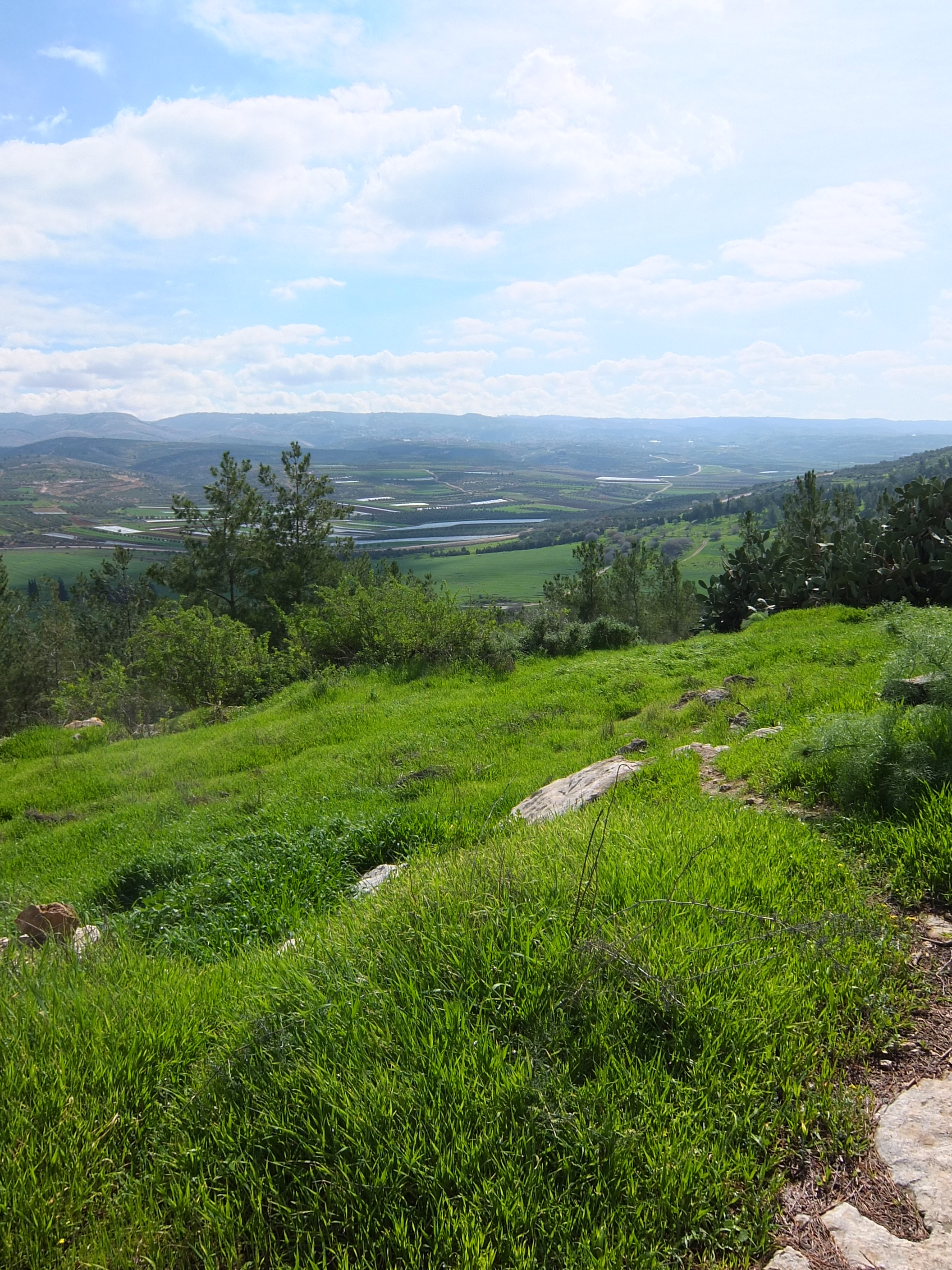
View from hilltop overlooking Wadi es-Ṣur, an extension of the Elah Valley in Israel

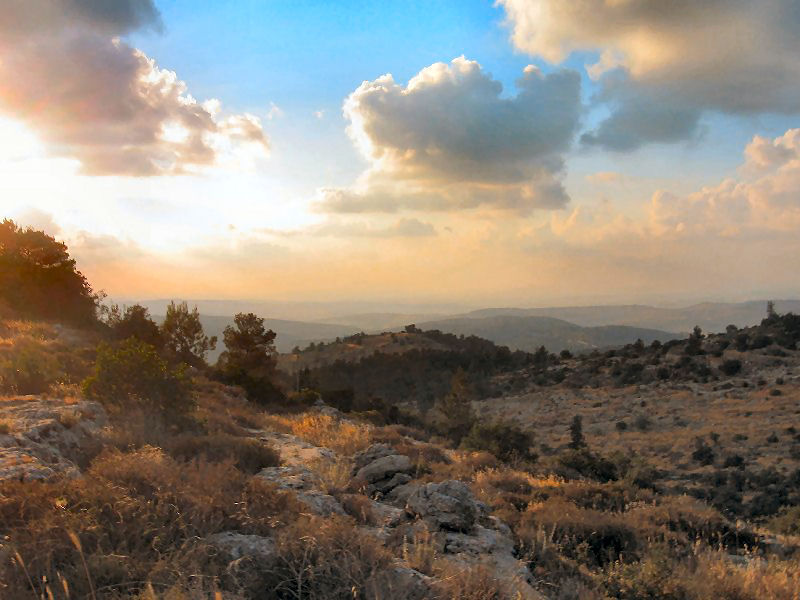
View from Beit Meir in the Judaean Mountains

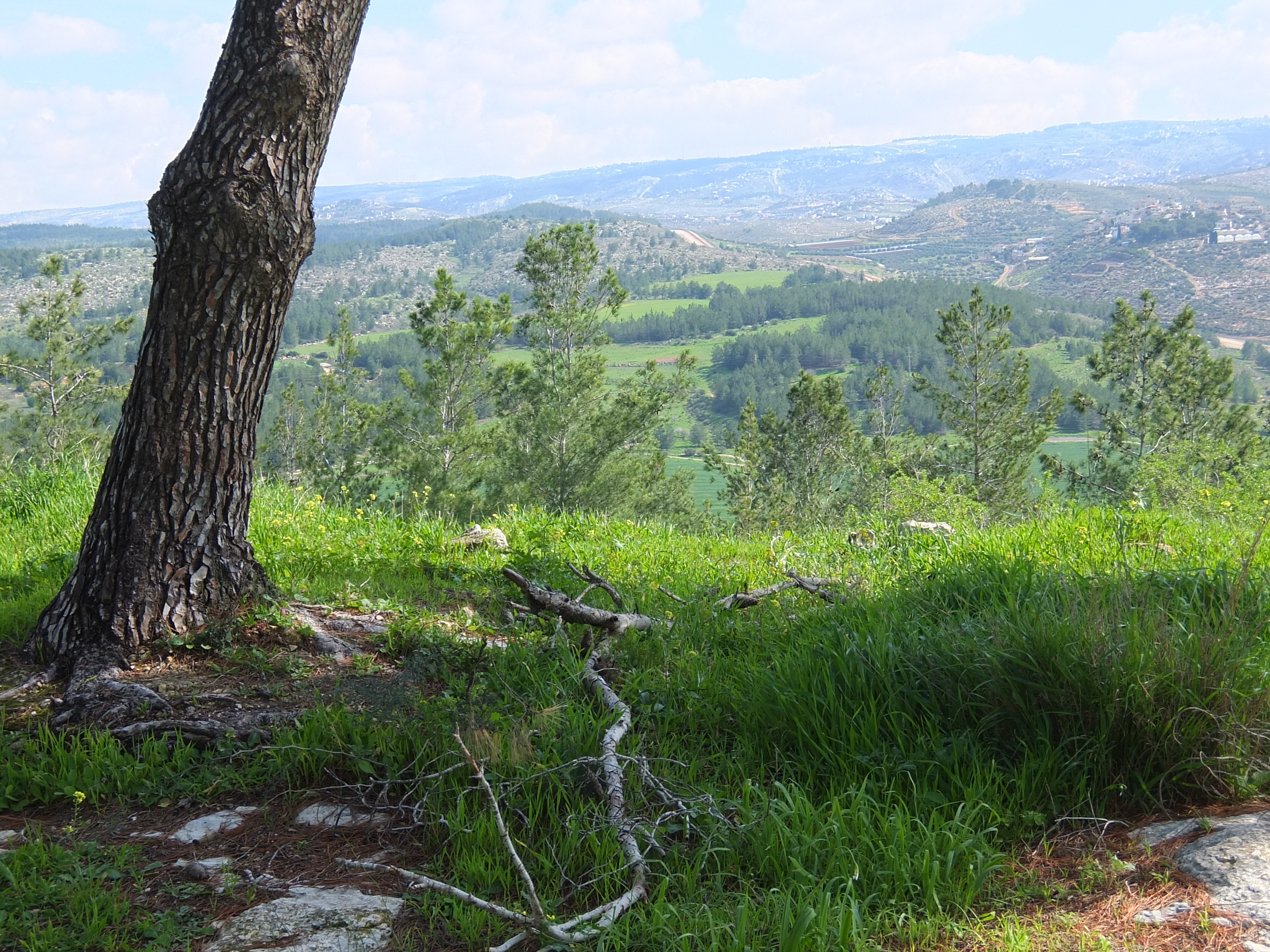
Idyllic scene in the Judean Mountains, overlooking the village of Khirbet ed-Deir which sits along the Green Line

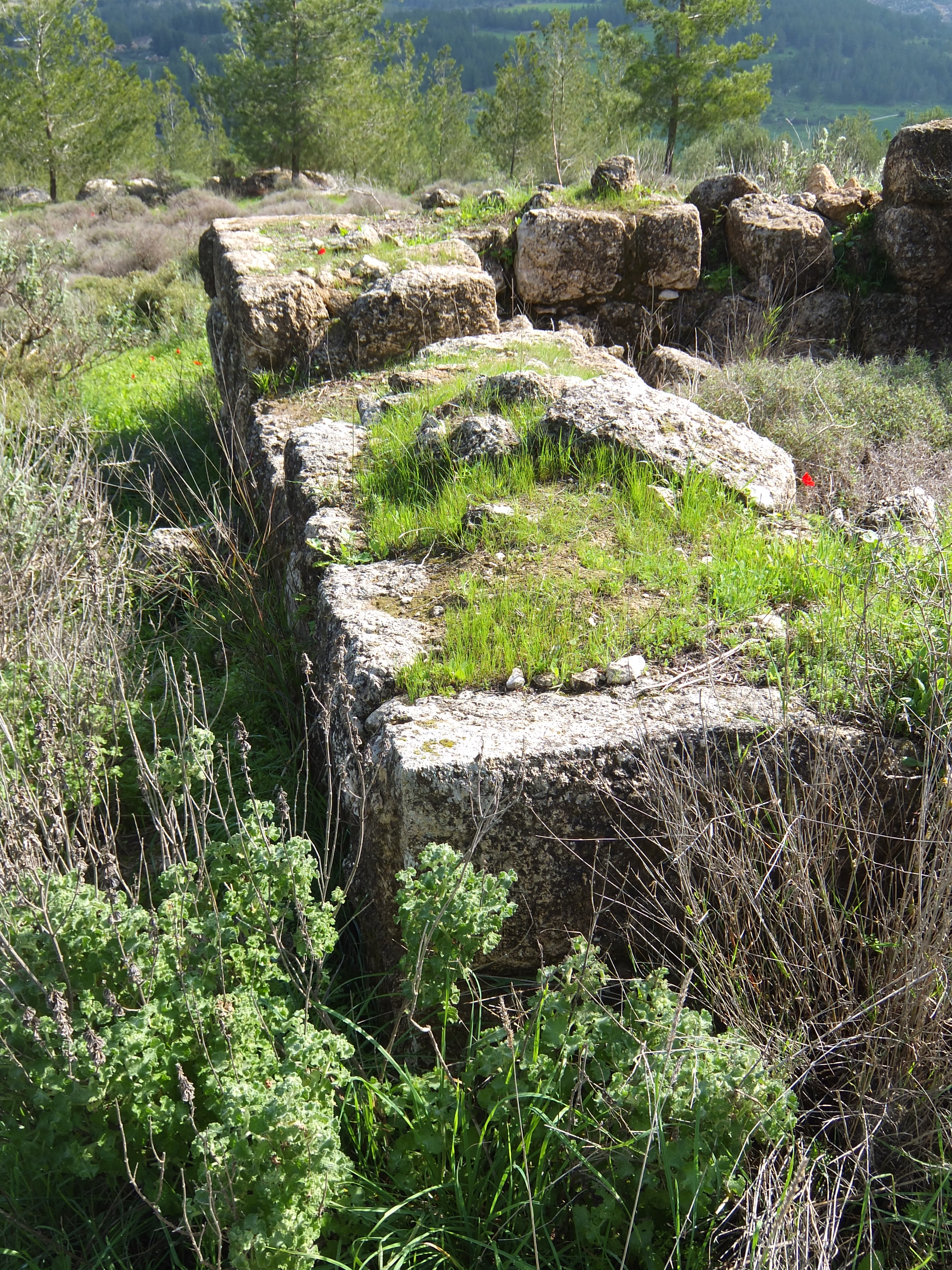
The ruined structure of an ancient house, near Neve Michael

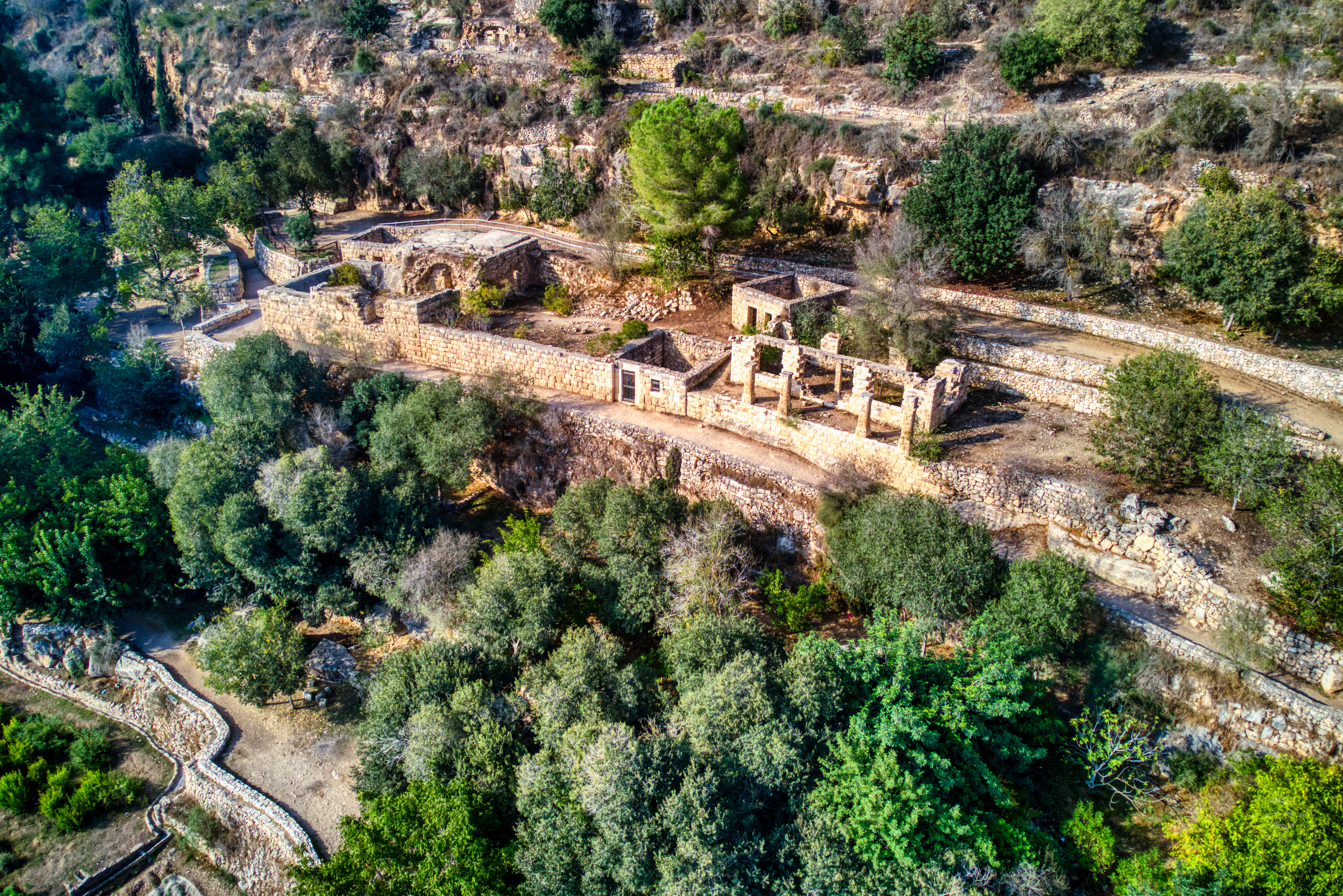
Remains of Sataf village

== See also ==
- Judaean Desert, the arid area in the eastern Judaean Mountains and western Jordan Rift Valley
- Mount of Temptation (Jebel Quruntul)
