= Kafra =

Kafra (meaning "The village" in Arabic) may refer to:

== Palestine ==
- Kafra, Baysan, Palestinian village, depopulated in 1948

== Syria ==
- Kafra, Syria, in Aleppo Governorate
- Kafraa, in Hama Governorate

== Lebanon ==
- Bekaa Kafra, in Bsharri District
- Kafra, Lebanon, in Bint Jbeil District
