= Afrin Dam =

Dam in northwest Syria

- Satellite view 5 June 2002 - dam circled

- Location within Syria
- Official name: 17 April Dam
- Country: Syria
- Location: Afrin District
- Coordinates: 36.623103°N 36.873184°E
- Purpose: Reservoir
- Status: Operational
- Construction began: 1997
- Opening date: 24 April 2004
- Construction cost: LS 58.2 billion

Dam and spillways
- Type of dam: Earth fill
- Impounds: Afrin River
- Height (foundation): 73 metres (240 ft)
- Length: 983 metres (3,225 ft)
- Width (crest): 22 metres (72 ft)
- Width (base): 385 metres (1,263 ft)
- Spillways: 1
- Spillway type: Half-fan
- Spillway capacity: 1,329 cubic metres per second (46,900 cu ft/s)

Reservoir
- Creates: Maydanki Lake
- Total capacity: 190,000,000 cubic metres (6.7×10^{9} cu ft)
- Catchment area: 1,365 square kilometres (527 sq mi)
- Surface area: 9.25 square kilometres (3.57 sq mi)
- Maximum length: 14 kilometres (8.7 mi)
- Maximum width: 650 metres (2,130 ft)
- Normal elevation: 339 metres (1,112 ft)

The Afrin Dam (Arabic: سد عفرين), officially 17 April Dam (Arabic: سد 17 نيسان), also called Maydanki Dam (Arabic: سد ميدانكي), (Note: The dam is also called the 17 April Dam, or Medanki Dam. As of 2017 Google Maps showed the reservoir as "Maydanki Lake", after the village of Maydankê on the northwest side. Other sources call it the dam lake of Maydanke or Meydankê.) is an earth-filled water storage and hydroelectric power dam on the Afrin River in northwest Syria. It provides drinking water to almost 200,000 people, irrigates about 30,000 hectares (74,000 acres) of olives, fruit trees and agricultural crops, and supplies 25 MW of hydroelectric power. It is currently under the control of the Turkish Armed Forces.

== Location ==
The dam is north of the town of Afrin in northwest Syria. It is 70 kilometres (43 mi) from the city of Aleppo and 12 kilometres (7.5 mi) from the town of Afrin, near the village of Midaneka (Maydanki). A large part of the region is planted with olive and fruit trees. About 80% of the area depends on rainwater irrigation, and the remainder on wells and pumps. Before the dam was built, the orchards and other crops were irrigated, but the olive trees were not. The Afrin District is populated by Kurds, the furthest west of the Syrian Kurdish regions.

The catchment area is 1,365 square kilometres (527 sq mi), with annual rainfall of 330 to 700 millimetres (13 to 28 in). The Afrin River originates in the south of the Kartal Mountains in Turkey, crosses into Syria where it runs through the city of Afrin, and then crosses back into Turkey. About 250,000,000 cubic metres (8.8×10^{9} cu ft) of the annual flow of the river comes from the Hatay Province of Turkey, while about 60,000,000 cubic metres (2.1×10^{9} cu ft) originates in Syria.

== History ==
The dam was intended to irrigate land in the river valley in the region between Aleppo and the border with Turkey. The project was approved in 1984 after extensive studies by the Ministry of Irrigation. The dam would control the river flow and prevent flooding, irrigate up to 30,000 hectares (74,000 acres) of land, supply drinking water in the region, provide up to 20 MW of hydroelectric power and would become a tourist attraction.

Construction began in 1997. The dam was built for the General Water Resources Authority at a total cost of LS 58.2 billion, including the cost of land acquisition for the reservoir. 1,800,000 cubic metres (64,000,000 cu ft) of earth and rock was excavated during construction. The dam was inaugurated on 24 April 2004 in the presence of Prime Minister Muhammad Naji al-Otari. Syrian state resolution No. 1849 of 2004 declared that the 17 April Dam Lake was a protected area.

A 2016 report noted that water usage appeared to have dropped due to the Syrian Civil War. On 9 March 2018, during Operation Olive Branch, armed units belonging to the Syrian National Army rebel faction and the Turkish Armed Forces seized control of the dam, capturing it from the Kurdish-majority People's Protection Units (YPG).

On 13 January 2019, body filling, water intake structure, reinforced concrete and mechanical cover systems were completed and repaired by the Turkish State Hydraulic Works (DSI), who renamed it the Upper Afrin Dam.

After the 2023 Turkey–Syria earthquake, the Afrin Dam suffered damage, with visible cracks on its surface, raising concerns that the dam could collapse. Activists and journalists were prevented from visiting the dam by the Syrian National Army. Water levels were reportedly low at the time.

== Dam ==
The earth-filled dam is 73 metres (240 ft) high, with a crest length of 983 metres (3,225 ft). It has a width of 385 metres (1,263 ft) at the base and 22 metres (72 ft) at the crest. The top of the dam is at an altitude of 339 metres (1,112 ft). The outlet tower has a cross-section of 20 by 20 metres (66 by 66 ft) and a height of 89.5 metres (294 ft). The half-fan spillway has capacity of 1,329 cubic metres per second (46,900 cu ft/s).

A tunnel with a diameter of 5.5 metres (18 ft) and length of 280 metres (920 ft) provides for emergency discharge. Another tunnel, with a diameter of 15 metres (49 ft) and length of 295 metres (968 ft). is used to discharge drinking and irrigation water. There are also wells and tunnels for inspection and drainage of water infiltrating the dam. An innovative network of electrical measurement devices is installed in the body of the dam and the different facilities, including those for measuring temperature and seismic activity. The hydroelectric plant provides 25 MW of power.

== Reservoir ==
The reservoir has a capacity of 190,000,000 cubic metres (6.7×10^{9} cu ft). It is 14 kilometres (8.7 mi) long, and 650 metres (2,130 ft) wide in the center section. It covers an area of 925 hectares (2,290 acres). The maximum flow is 1,840 cubic metres per second (65,000 cu ft/s). The irrigated area is 31,263 hectares (77,250 acres) in the Afrin district. Irrigation plans are 52% olive trees, 11% fruit trees, 31% crops such as wheat, barley, beets, watermelons and cotton, and 6% other vegetables. Drinking water is supplied to about 197,000 people.

=== Tourism ===
Maydanki Lake is a popular domestic recreational spot, often visited by Aleppians in the summer for picnics and swimming. Local tourism diminished as result of the civil war, however, and mostly collapsed during Operation Olive Branch. Nevertheless, the region's tourism sector had begun to recover by July 2018, with two of the lake's ten cafes and restaurants reopened.

== Sources ==
- "سد 17 نيسان (سد ميدانكي) في منطقة عفرين / The 17 April dam (Maidanki dam) in the Afrin area", Lokman Afrin (in Arabic)
- "سد 17 نيسان في منطقة عفرين / The 17 April dam in the Afrin area", Tirej Afrin (in Arabic)
- "36.636995, 36.893959", Google Maps
- "7: Orontes River Basin" (PDF), Inventory of Shared Water Resources in Western Asia, Beirut: UN-ESCWA and BGR (United Nations Economic and Social Commission for Western Asia; Bundesanstalt für Geowissenschaften und Rohstoffe), 2013
- Afrin dam, ٍSyrian Civil Society support program, 15 May 2016
- Al Dbiyat, Mohamed; Geyer, Bernard, "The Orontes, a complex river", e-Atlas of the Orontes River basin: www.water-security.org, archived from the original on 23 March 2017
- Balanche, Fabrice (5 January 2016), The Die Is Cast: The Kurds Cross the Euphrates, Washington Institute
- Karatas, Atilla (April 2016), "Sustainable Water Management in Hatay: Hydrographic Planning Approach", Water Resources Management in the Lower Asi-Orontes River Basin, Graduate Institute of International and Development Studies and MEF University, ISBN 978-2-940503-70-4
- "List of names of villages and towns in the kurdish region of Afrin (Kurd-Dagh) in Syria", medan.comxa.com, archived from the original on 23 March 2017
- Resolution No. 1849 of 2004 declaring 17 April Dam Lake a protected area, 2004
- Sofer, Arnon (1999), Rivers of Fire: The Conflict Over Water in the Middle East, Rowman & Littlefield, ISBN 978-0-8476-8511-0
