= Jabal Sha'ir =

Syrian mountain summit

- Location within Syria

Highest point
- Elevation: 1,215 m (3,986 ft)
- Coordinates: 34°55′29″N 37°57′15″E

Naming
- English translation: جبل شاعر
- Language of name: ar

Geography
- Location: Hama Governorate, Syria

Jabal Sha'ir is a mountain in Hama Governorate in Syria. It has an elevation of 1,215 meters and ranks as the second highest mountain in the Hama Governorate and the 186th highest in Syria.

== See also ==
- List of mountains of Syria
