= Mount Simeon =

Mountain in Syria

- Location within Syria

Highest point
- Elevation: 876 m (2,874 ft)
- Coordinates: 36.2760°N 36.8225°E

Naming
- English translation: جبل سمعان
- Language of name: Arabic

Geography
- Location: Aleppo Governorate, Syria

Mount Simeon or Mount Simon (Arabic: جبل سمعان Jabal Simʻān [ˈʒæbæl sɪmˈʕaːn]), also called Mount Laylūn (Arabic: جبل ليلون), is a highland region in Aleppo Governorate in northern Syria. The mountain is located in the Mount Simeon and Aʻzāz districts of Aleppo Governorate.

It is named for Symeon the Stylite a Christian who lived atop a column in the region for 37 years and for whom a large monastery complex was established.

== Landscape ==
Mount Simeon is part of the Limestone Massif in the western part of the Aleppo plateau. It is located about 20 km northwest of Aleppo. The mountain runs for 50 km from north to south with a width range of 20–40 km and average elevation of 500–600 m. The highest point is Sheikh Barakāt (876 m) in the southern part of the mountain.

The valley of River ʻIfrīn runs between Mount Simeon and Mount Kurd to the west. Aʻzāz valley marks the northern boundary of the mountain, beyond which lies the Aʻzāz plain and Mount Barṣa (Barṣāyā) on the Aintab plateau. The valley of river Quweiq runs along the eastern side of the mountain. South of the mountain lie the Dāna and Atarib plains. Old routes connecting Qinnasrin to Antioch run through these plains to the ʻIfrīn valley at its westward turn and separate Mount Simeon from Ḥārim Mountains to the south.
