= Palmyra fold belt =

Fold belt, i.e. geological layers forming mountains, located mostly in Syria,

The Palmyra fold belt forms fold mountains found mostly in Syria. The mountains are formed due to thrusting together of Aleppo plateau in the north and Rubtah uplift in the south. This is according to the modern theory of plate tectonics. Similar view of the feature from the geosyncline theory can be taken where Palmyra can be viewed as Median mass between the two forelands of Aleppo foreland in the north and Rubtah foreland in the south.

== See also ==
- Syrian Arc
