= Jabal al-Arba'in =

- Location within Syria

Highest point
- Elevation: 683 m (2,241 ft)
- Coordinates: 35°02′22″N 36°46′35″E

Naming
- English translation: جبل الأربعين
- Language of name: ar

Geography
- Location: Hama, Syria

Jabal al-Arba'in (also spelled known as Jabal Maarin) is a mountain near Maarin al-Jabal in the Hama Governorate in Syria. It has an elevation of 683 meters, it ranks as the 27th highest mountain in Hama and the 507th highest in Syria.

== See also ==
- List of mountains in Syria
