= Jabal al-Fawwar =

- Location within Syria

Highest point
- Elevation: 1,174 m (3,852 ft)
- Coordinates: 35°12′03″N 36°16′18″E

Naming
- English translation: جبل الفوار
- Language of name: ar

Geography
- Location: Hama, Syria

Jabal al-Fawwar is a mountain in Hama Governorate in Syria. It has an elevation of 1,174 meters, it ranks as the third highest mountain in Hama and the 203rd highest in Syria.

== See also ==
- List of mountains of Syria
