= Yezidism in Syria =

Ethnoreligious group

Yazidism
Total population
- 10,000–50,000 (estimated)

Regions with significant populations
- Syria

Religions
- Yazidism

Languages
- Kurmanji Kurdish

Related ethnic groups
- Kurdish people
- Yazidis in Syria primarily live in the Al-Jazira area and the Kurd-Dagh region. The population is difficult to estimate, with numbers ranging from 10,000 to 50,000. Since 2014, Yazidis from Iraq have sought refuge in Syria, especially in the Autonomous Administration of North and East Syria. Yazidis in Syria have faced displacement and persecution, particularly after Turkish occupation of northern Syria.

Yazidism in Syria refers to people born in or residing in Syria who adhere to Yazidism, a strictly endogamous religion. Yazidis in Syria live primarily in two communities, one in the Al-Jazira area and the other in the Kurd-Dagh. Exact population data of Yazidis in Syria is unavailable, but it is estimated that between 10,000-50,000 Yazidis reside in Syria.

Population numbers for the Syrian Yazidi community are unclear. In 1963, the community was estimated at 10,000, according to the national census, but numbers for 1987 were unavailable. There may be between about 12,000 and 15,000 Yazidis in Syria today. Since 2014, more Yazidis from Iraq have sought refuge in the Autonomous Administration of North and East Syria to escape the genocide of Yazidis by ISIL. In 2014, there were about 40,000 Yazidis in Syria, primarily in the Al-Jazirah and Kurd-Dagh regions.

Following the extension of the Turkish occupation of northern Syria into the Kurdish-majority Afrin District, reports have emerged of Yazidis in demographically mixed villages of the Kurd-Dagh region being targeted by the Turkish-backed Syrian National Army (SNA) because of their religious identity, as well as having their shrines desecrated. As in October 2019 Turkey invaded the north eastern part of Syria; several Yazidi villages have been targeted and their inhabitants fled to the region still under the control of the AANES. Kidnapping of Yazidi women and girls by the SNA is an ongoing problem.

== Notable Syrian-Yazidi people ==
- Ibrahim Khalil: is a Yazidi singer from Syria.

== See also ==
- Al-Jazira Province
- List of Yazidi settlements
- Genocide of Yazidis by ISIL
