= Jabal Zawiya =

Highlands in Idlib Governorate, Syria

Coordinates: 35°44′N 36°42′E

Mount Zāwiya
- Mount Rīḥā, Banī-ʻUlaym Mountain

Highest point
- Peak: Mount Ayyūb
- Elevation: 939 m (3,081 ft)

Geography
- Location: Idlib Governorate, Syria
- Country: Syria
- Parent range: Limestone Massif, Aleppo Plateau

Mount Zāwiya (Arabic: جبل الزاوية, romanized: Jabal az-Zāwiyah) or Mount Rīḥā (Arabic: جبل ريحا, romanized: Jabal Rīḥā) (also in medieval times: Banī-ʻUlaym Mountain (Arabic: جبل بني عليم, romanized: Jabal Banī-ʻUlaym)) is a highland region in the Idlib Governorate in northwestern Syria. Around 36 towns and villages exist in the Mount Zawiya region. The biggest towns are Rīḥā (Arīḥā) and Maʻarrat an-Nuʻmān.

== Location and description ==
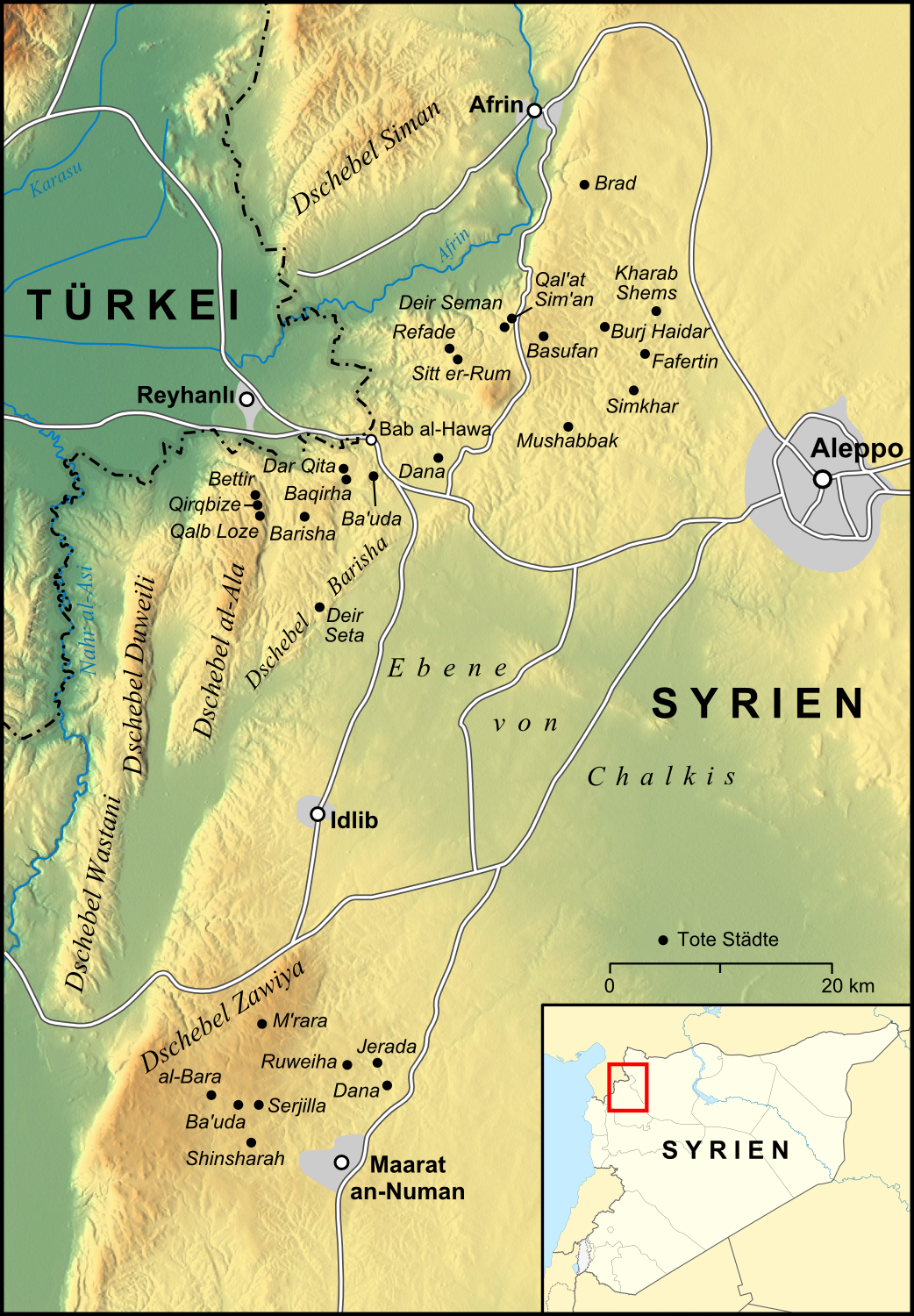
Mount Zāwiya part of the southern group of the Limestone Massif

Mount Zāwiya forms the southern group of the Limestone Massif of the western Aleppo plateau. To the north and northwest of the mountain lies the Rouge Plain. The Ghāb Plain is on the western side. South of the mountain are the plains of Ḥamā, and on the eastern side are the plains of Idlib.

The average elevation of Mount Zāwiya is 750 m. The highest point is Mount Ayyūb (939 m). The western side of the mountain is steep, but the eastern side slopes gradually. Many springs and streams arise on the western side and drain into the Rouge and Ghāb plains.

The mountain includes two masses separated by a valley which has many archaeological sites, such as the ancient city of Bārā. The northern part of the mountain is called Mount Arbaʻīn (Arabic: جبل الأربعين) (877 m). The ancient city of Ebla stands northeast of the mountain, and the ancient city of Apamea stands in the southwest.

The region is also known for hosting various shrines dedicated to Sufi orders, visited by its local inhabitants. Since the outbreak of the Syrian Civil War however, Sufi shrines in Jabal al-Zawiya have been under threat of desecration by extremist forces, most notably in late 2016.

== Syrian Civil War ==
It was the location of the December 2011 Jabal al-Zawiya massacres. It was bombed again as part of a Syrian government and Russian offensive in September 2017.

The location has been a stronghold for Hayat Tahrir al-Sham (HTS), especially after the Idlib ceasefire in the aftermath of the Northwestern Syria offensive of 2019–2020 with hundreds of refugees from throughout Syria carving into the mountains a network of caves and living spaces, effectively turning the mountains into a fortified underground city.

On November 25, 2023, the HTS and the Syrian Observatory for Human Rights (SOHR) reported that nine civilians, including six children, were killed in a government bombardment while "picking olives" near the front-line.
