= Jabal Kafraa =

Mountain in Syria

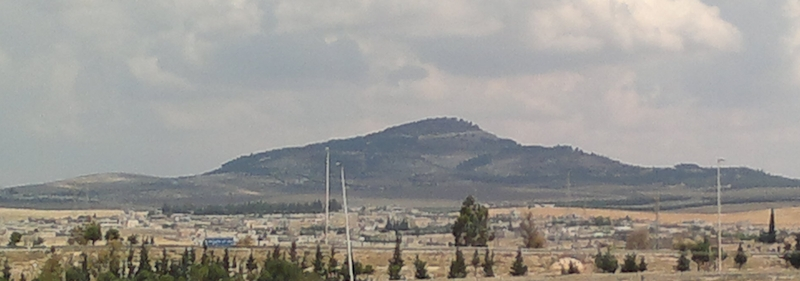
- Jabal Kafraa

Highest point
- Elevation: 625 m (2,051 ft)
- Coordinates: 35°12′41″N 36°47′58″E

Naming
- English translation: جبل كفراع
- Language of name: ar

Geography
- Location within Syria
- Location: Hama Governorate, Syria

Jabal Kafraa (also spelled Jabal Kafr Ra' or Jabal Kifra') is a mountain near Kafraa in the Hama Governorate in Syria. It has an elevation of 625 meters (2,051 feet) and is located near Jabal Zayn al-Abidin, it ranks as the 30th highest mountain in Hama and the 540th highest in Syria.
