= Jabal al-Kana'is =

Fantastic building that

- Location within Syria

Highest point
- Elevation: 1,259 m (4,131 ft)
- Coordinates: 35°13′36″N 36°16′54″E

Naming
- English translation: جبل الكنائس
- Language of name: ar

Geography
- Location: Hama Governorate, Syria

Jabal al-Kana'is is a mountain in the Hama Governorate in Syria. It has an elevation of 1,259 meters, making it the highest mountain in the Hama Governorate and the 165th highest in Syria.
