= Syrian Arc =

Geological fold structures in the Middle East and northeast Africa

The Syrian Arc is a series of fold structures that extend from Syria, through Lebanon and Israel/Palestine into northern Sinai and on into Egypt's Eastern and Western deserts. The folds started forming during the Late Cretaceous epoch as a result of the closure of the Neotethys Ocean that caused shortening of the continental margin with reactivation of the extensional faults formed during the Jurassic period.

== Extent ==
The furthest west that folds have been attributed to the Syrian Arc deformation phase is in the northern Western Desert near Matruh. The area of folding continues to the east forming a broad zone about 200 km wide passing into the Eastern Desert, including major structures such as Kattaniya and the breached anticline at Wadi Araba, near the Dead Sea on the western side of the Gulf of Suez. In Sinai, a series of other breached anticlinal structures are developed, such as those at Halal, Maghara and Yelleg.

== Geometry ==
The Syrian Arc has an overall S-shape, with structures trending WSW–ENE in Egypt and Syria and SSW–NNE trending in the intervening section.

=== The Palmyra fold belt ===
In Syria the main Syrian Arc structure is the WSW–ENE trending Palmyra fold belt. It extends eastward from the Dead Sea Transform, dying out near the Euphrates Graben. The left lateral offset of the Palmyrides against the other part of the Syrian Arc across the Dead Sea Transform has been estimated as a maximum of about 107 km.

== Origin ==
Two main phases of tectonics were responsible for the formation of the Syrian Arc structures. The first, dominated by extensional tectonics, was associated with the development of a passive margin in northern Africa as the Neotethys Ocean was formed. The second, dominated by contractional tectonics, was associated with the closure of that ocean. Some of the structures were further modified in the Cenozoic during the formation of the Dead Sea Transform and the continued northward movement of the Arabian Plate.

=== Passive margin formation ===
During the Permian, a period of rifting affected northern Africa associated with the development of the Neotethys Ocean and the breaking away of the Cimmerian continent. This rifting continued intermittently during the Triassic, Jurassic and early Cretaceous periods. This prolonged extensional episode formed a large number of sedimentary basins within the passive margin, with a mainly Jurassic to Lower Cretaceous fill.

=== Neotethys closure ===
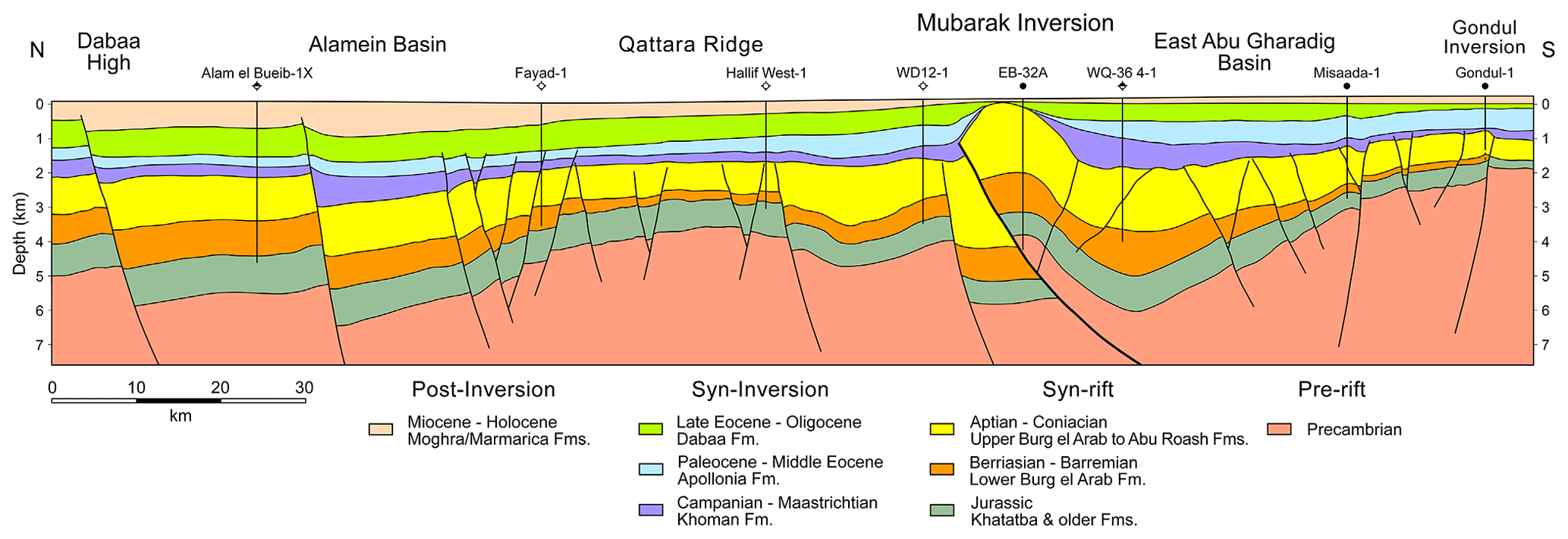
Cross-section over the eastern part of the Western Desert, Bosworth & Tari (2021), four times vertical exaggeration. Geometry of the Mubarak Inversion shows growth from the Santonian through to the Paleogene

As part of the overall convergence between the African and Eurasian plates, the Neotethys ocean began to close. This led to a change in the prevailing stress field in the passive margin to one of regional compression, NNW–SSE orientated. This caused reactivation of many of the extensional faults bounding the half-graben basins, inverting them. The first phase of inversion folding appears to have started in the Santonian age. Several further pulses of folding occurred during the Paleogene in the Western Desert.
