= Kafraa =

Kafraa كفراع
- Village
- Location in Syria
- Coordinates: 35°13′3″N 36°48′21″E
- Country: Syria
- Governorate: Hama
- District: Hama
- Subdistrict: Hama

Population (2004)
  - Total: 2,621
- Time zone: UTC+3 (AST)
- City Qrya Pcode: C3005

Kafraa (Arabic: كفراع) is a Syrian village located near the Jabal Kafraa mountain in the Hama Subdistrict of the Hama District in the Hama Governorate. According to the Syria Central Bureau of Statistics (CBS), Kafraa had a population of 2,621 in the 2004 census.
