= Lake Amik =

Former lake in Turkey

Coordinates: 36°18′N 36°18′E

Lake Amik or the Lake of Antioch (Arabic: بحيرة العمق; Turkish: Amik Gölü) was a large freshwater lake in the basin of the Orontes River in Hatay Province, Turkey. It was located north-east of the ancient city of Antioch (modern Antakya). The lake was drained between the 1940s–1970s.

== Hydrology and history ==
The Lake of Antioch, showing its setting in Amik Plain. Early 20th century.

Lake Amik was located in the centre of Amik Plain (Turkish: Amik Ovası) on the northernmost part of the Dead Sea Transform and historically covered an area of some 300–350 km^{2} (120–140 sq mi), increasing during flood periods. It was surrounded by extensive marshland.

Sedimentary analysis has suggested that Lake Amik was formed, in its final state, in the past 3,000 years by episodic floods and silting up of the outlet to the Orontes River. This dramatic increase in the lake's area had displaced many settlements during the classical period; the lake became an important source of fish and shellfish for the surrounding area and the city of Antioch. The 14th century Arab geographer Abu al-Fida described the lake as having sweet water and being 20 mi (32 km) long and 7 mi (11 km) wide, while an 18th-century traveller, Richard Pococke, noted that it was then locally called "Bahr-Agoule (the White Lake) by reason of the colour of its waters".

By the 20th century, the lake supported around 50,000 inhabitants in 70 villages, who took part in stock raising, reed harvesting, fishing (with a particularly significant eel fishery) and agriculture, crops and fodder being grown on pastures formed during the summer as the lake waters receded. They also constructed dwellings, locally known as Huğ, from reeds gathered in the lake.

== Ecology ==
Lake Amik was an extremely valuable habitat on the migratory routes of waterfowl and other birds, especially white storks and pelicans, and was noted for an isolated breeding population of the African darter. It also supported populations of endemic birds; a possible distinct subspecies of the black francolin (Francolinus francolinus billypayni) and the similarly distinct southern Turkish bearded reedling (Panurus biarmicus kosswigi). A cyprinid fish species Hemigrammocapoeta caudomaculata was described from Lake Amik and feared extinct after the draining, but turned out to belong to genus Garra and still be reasonably common in the Orontes river basin; the cyprinid Jordan himri was found nowhere else in Turkey, being replaced by its local relative Orontes himri elsewhere in Hatay Province.

With the draining of the lake, the endemic bird and fish species have become extinct; the region's biodiversity was further harmed by the fact that one of the few similar habitats, Lake Hula in northern Israel, was also drained in the 1950s.

== Draining ==
Draining and reclamation of areas around the lake commenced in 1940, in order to free land for growing cotton and to eliminate malaria. A major drainage project, channeling the lake's tributary rivers (the Karasu, the ancient Labotas, and the Afrin, the ancient Arceuthus or Arxeuthas) directly to the Orontes was undertaken from 1966 by the State Hydraulic Works, with further works completed by the early 1970s; by this time the lake had been completely drained, and its bed reclaimed for farmland.

As of 2007, Hatay Airport has been constructed in the centre of the lakebed.

There have increasingly been reports that the draining of Lake Amik has caused severe environmental damage. Reclaimed and irrigated land has been affected by increasing soil salinity, and productivity has fallen. Despite the drainage works, many areas still regularly flood, requiring constant maintenance of drainage canals and further decreasing the productivity of the reclaimed farmland, while the water table has fallen dramatically from an average of 20 m (66 ft) to 400 m (1,300 ft) at some points. The fall in underground water levels has been implicated in causing an increasing amount of subsidence and serious damage to buildings.
