= Orontes River =

River in Lebanon and Turkey, West Asia

Orontes Nahr al-ʿĀṣī
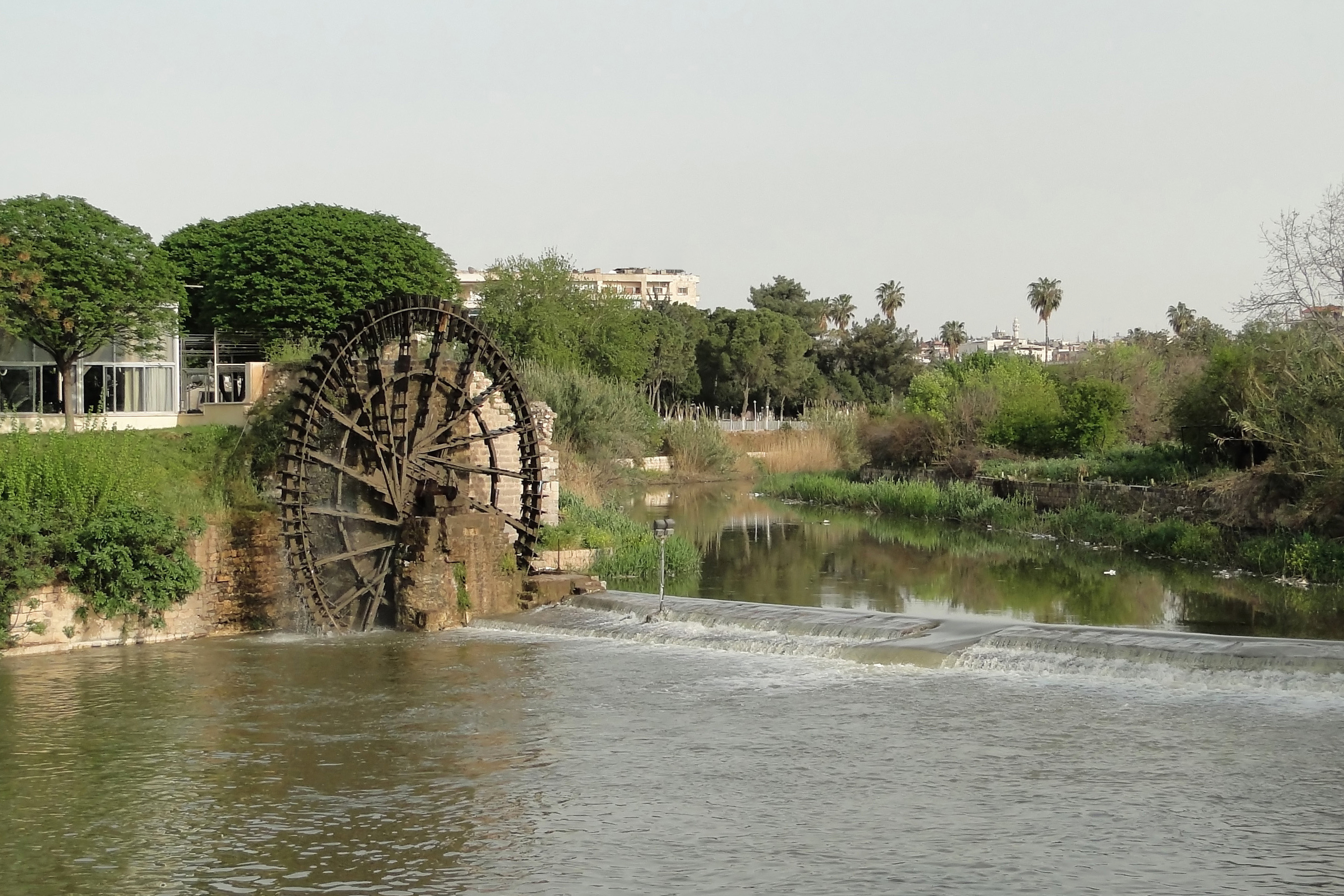
- The Norias of Hama along the Orontes in Syria
- Native name: العاصي (Arabic); Asi (Turkish)

Location
- Country: Lebanon, Syria, Turkey
- Cities: Homs, Hama, Jisr al-Shughur, Antakya

Physical characteristics
- Source: Labweh
  - location: Beqaa Valley, Lebanon
  - coordinates: 34°11′49″N 36°21′9″E
  - elevation: 910 m (2,990 ft)
- Mouth: Samandağ
  - location: Hatay Province, Turkey
  - coordinates: 36°2′43″N 35°57′49″E
  - elevation: 0 m (0 ft)
- Length: 571 km (355 mi)
- Basin size: 24,660 km^{2} (9,520 sq mi)
- Discharge
  - average: 67 m^{3}/s (2,400 cu ft/s)

Basin features
- Tributaries
  - right: Afrin River, Karasu

The Orontes (/ɔːˈrɒntiːz/; from Ancient Greek Ὀρόντης, Oróntēs) or Nahr al-ʿĀṣī, or simply Asi (Arabic: العاصي, romanized: al-ʿĀṣī, IPA: [alˈʕaːsˤiː]; Turkish: Asi) is a 571 kilometres (355 mi) long river in West Asia that begins in Lebanon, flowing northwards through Syria before entering the Mediterranean Sea near Samandağ in Hatay Province, Turkey.

As the chief river of the northern Levant, the Orontes has been the site of many major battles including the Battle of Kadesh (13th century BCE), and water distribution remains a controversial issue between the countries in the region. Among the most important cities on the river are Homs, Hama, Jisr al-Shughur, Apamea (one of ancient Syrias most prominent cities), and Antakya (the ancient Antioch, which was also known as "Antioch on the Orontes" and was the capital of Syria for 938 years from 301 BCE–637 CE).

== Names ==
In the 9th century BCE, the ancient Assyrians referred to the river as Arantu, and the nearby Egyptians called it Araunti. The etymology of the name is unknown, yet some sources indicate that it might be derived from Arnt which means "lioness" in Aramaic; (Note: The source of the river Orontes is the village of Labweh, which also means "lioness".) others called it Alimas, a water goddess whose name appears in Aramaic. (Note: The part of the river flowing from Lake Homs to Homs is known as Al-Mimas, after the sanctuary of Deir Mimas situated there in honor of Saint Mamas.) Arantu gradually became "Orontes" in Greek.

In the Greek epic poem Dionysiaca (circa 400 CE), the river is said to have been named after Orontes, an Indian military leader who killed himself and fell into the river after losing a single combat to Dionysus. According to the Greek geographer Strabo (in Geographica, circa 20 CE), the river was originally named Typhon, because it was said that Zeus had struck the dragon Typhon down from the sky with thunder, and the river had formed where Typhon's body had fallen; however, the river was later renamed Orontes when a man named Orontes built a bridge on it. (Note: Pliny the Elder mentioned a tributary of the Orontes as Marsyas river (named after Marsyas). The same tributary was drawn by Richard Pococke to the east of the Orontes in the al-Ghab plain near Apamea.)

Macedonian settlers in Apamea named it the Axius, after a Macedonian river god. The Arabic name العاصي (al-‘Āṣī) is derived from the ancient Axius. The word coincidentally means "insubordinate" in Arabic, which folk etymology ascribes to the fact that the river flows from the south to the north unlike the rest of the rivers in the region and that, as Nasir-i-Khusrau wrote in 1047, "for the reason that it flows towards the Greek territory; that is to say, it is a rebel to go from the lands of Islam to the lands of the Infidel".

Al-Idrisi reported in 1154 CE that the inhabitants of Homs called the portion of the river that passed through their city "al-Maklub".

== Course ==
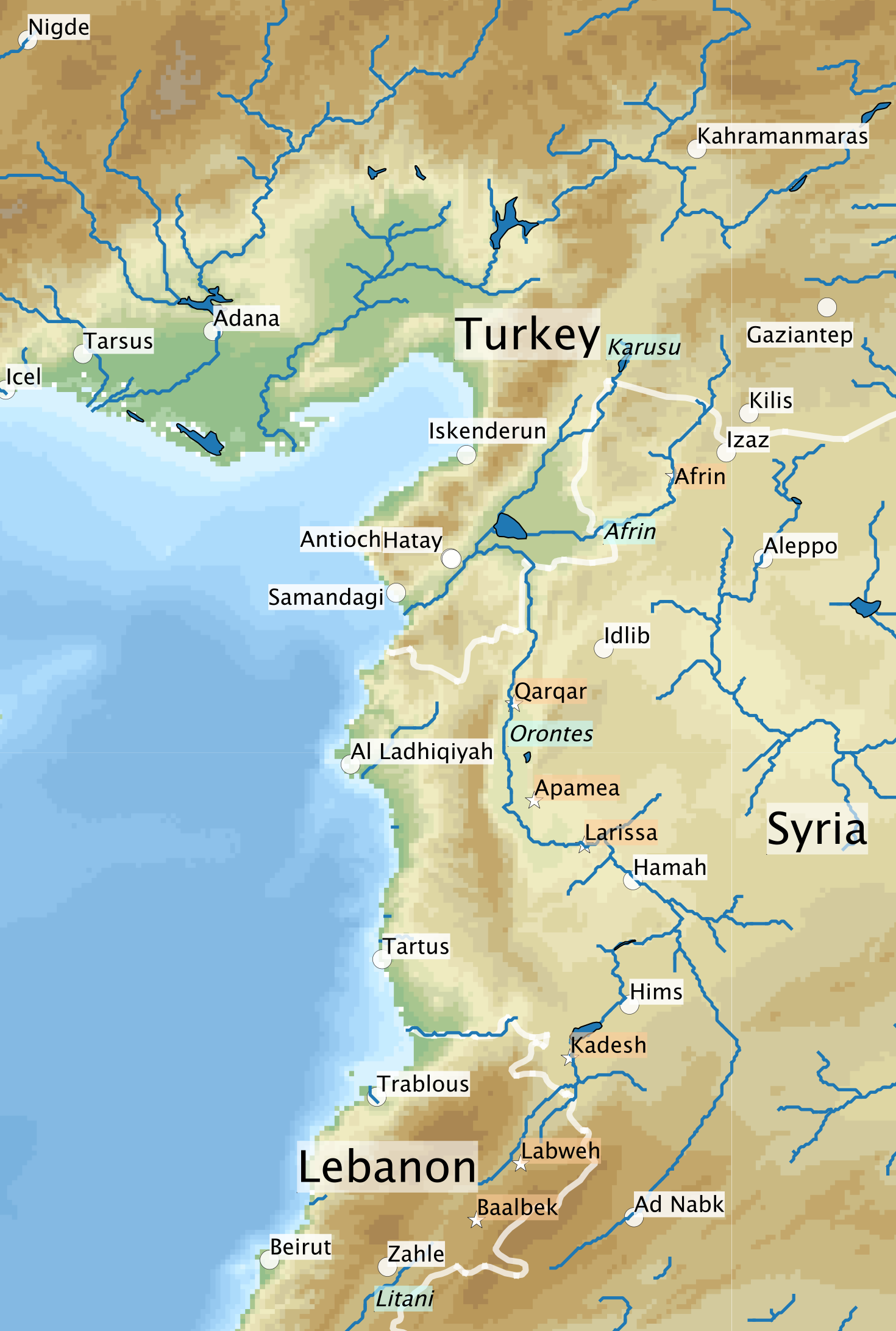
Map of the Orontes. White lines are country borders, river names are italic on a blue background, major cities or towns on white backgrounds, other places of significance on orange backgrounds.

The Orontes rises in the springs near Labweh in Lebanon on the east side of the Beqaa Valley (in the Beqaa Governorate) between Mount Lebanon on the west and the Anti-Lebanon Mountains on the east, very near the source of the southward-flowing Litani, and runs north, falling 600 metres (2,000 ft) through a gorge to leave the valley. The Ain ez Zarqa is one such major spring. Other major springs are Al Ghab, Al Rouj, and Al-Azraq. The river's drainage basin within Lebanon is 1,930 km^{2} (750 sq mi); the country's second largest behind Litani.

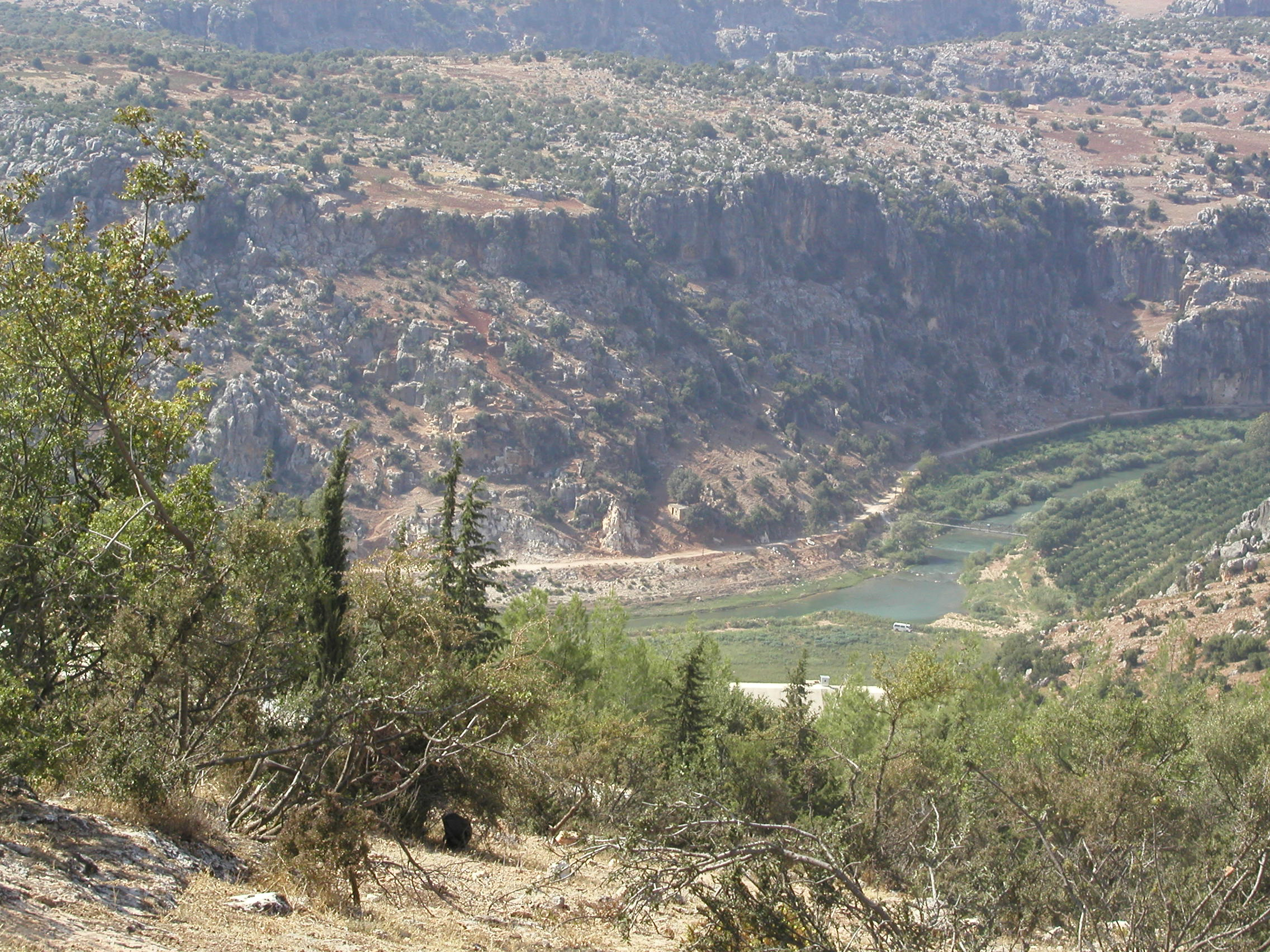
The Orontes flowing at the foot of the Syrian Coastal Mountain Range

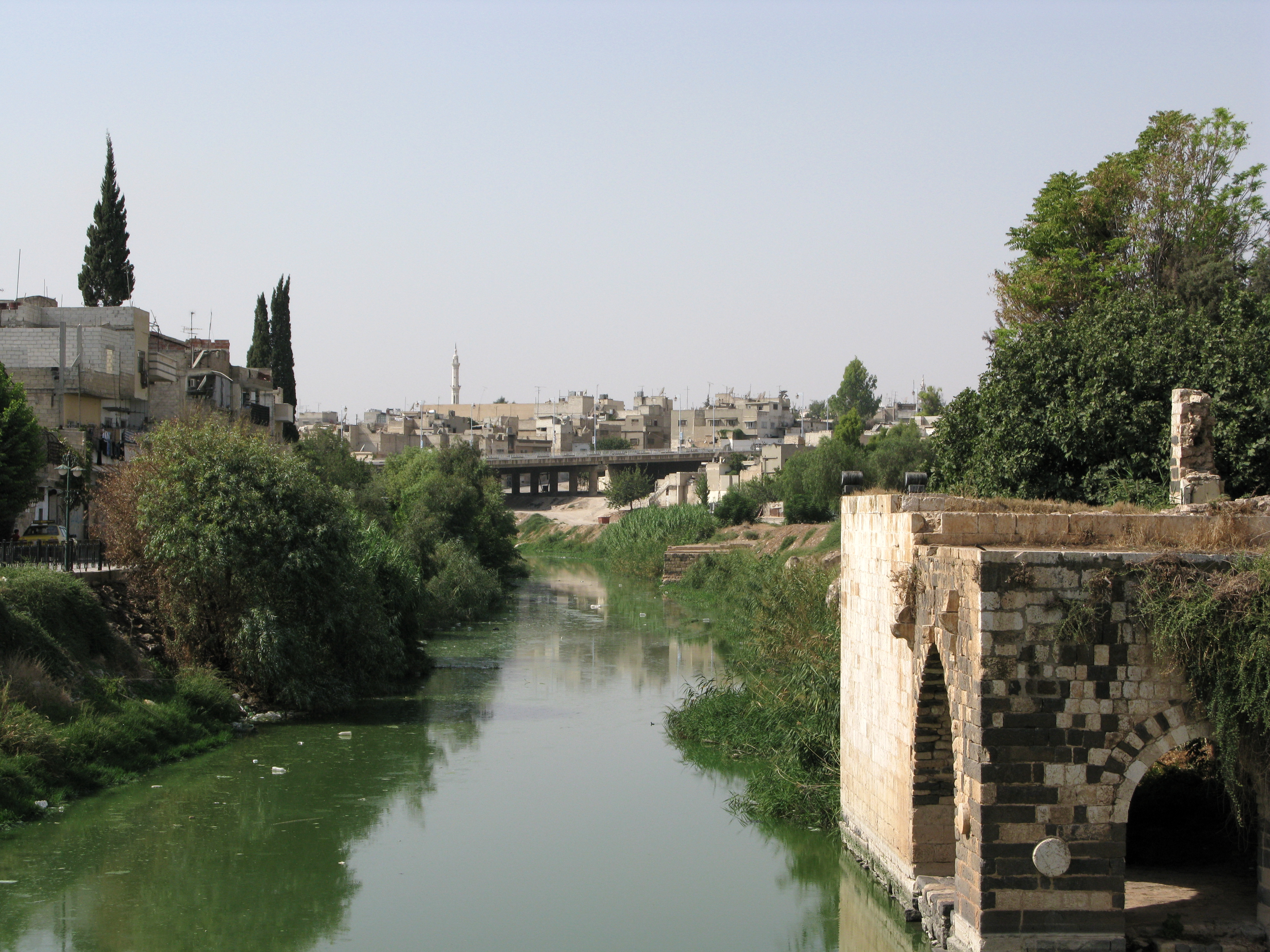
Orontes River in Hama, Syria

Leaving this gorge, it expands into the Lake of Homs (an artificial lake created by a Roman-era dam, also known as Qattinah lake) in the Homs Governorate of Syria and through the city of Homs (or Ḥimṣ). Next it flows through the Hama Governorate and its capital of Hamah (Hamaih-Epiphaneia), and the ancient site of Larissa (Shaizar). This is where the river enters the Ghab Plain. Further downstream, on the eastern edge of the Ghab, is located the ancient city of Apamea. To the west is the Coastal Mountain Range. The last Syrian governorate it goes through is Idlib and the city of Jisr al-Shughur. This section ends at the rocky barrier of Jisr al-Hadid, where the river turns west into the plain of Antioch (Amik Valley) in the Hatay Province of Turkey.

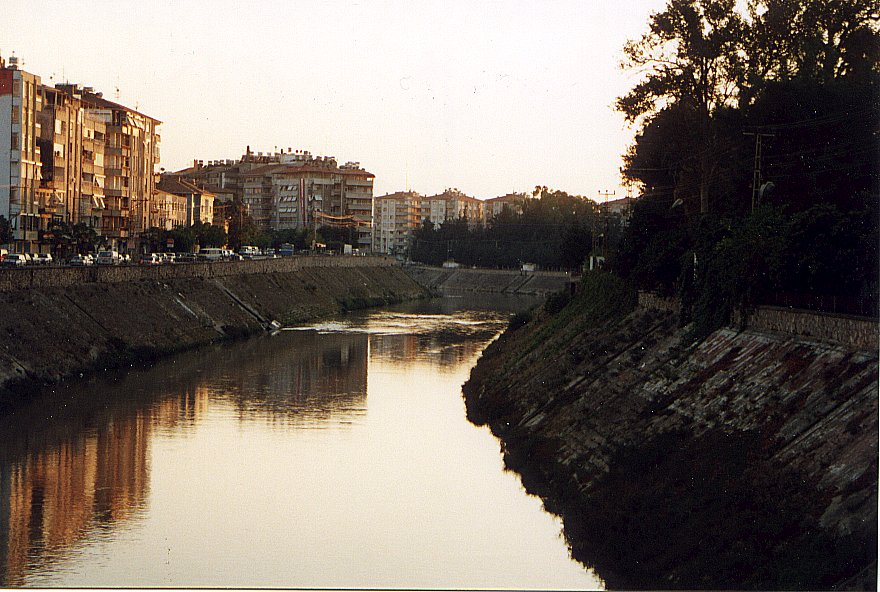
The Orontes in Antakya, Hatay

Two major tributaries, the southward-flowing Afrin River on the west and the Karasu on the east, join the Orontes through the former Lake Amik via an artificial channel (Nahr al-Kowsit). Passing north of Antakya (ancient Antioch), the Orontes dives southwest into a gorge (compared by the ancients to Tempe), and falls 50 metres (160 ft) in 16 kilometres (9.9 mi) to the sea just south of Samandağ (former Suedia, in antiquity Seleucia Pieria), after a total course of 450 kilometres (280 mi).

Major dams on the river
| Name | Nearest City | Year | Height (m) | Capacity (million m3) | Note |
|---|---|---|---|---|---|
| Al-Rastan | Homs | 1960 | 67 | 228 | |
| Qattinah | Homs | 1976 | 7 | 200 | originally built 284 CE |
| Mouhardeh | Hama | 1960 | 41 | 67 | |
| Zeyzoun | Hamah | 1995 | 43 | 71 | failed 2002 |
| Kastoun | Hamah | 1992 | 20 | 27 | |

== History ==
The Orontes is not easily navigable and the valley derives its historical importance as a road for north–south traffic; from Antioch south to Homs and thence to Damascus via al-Nabek. The Orontes has long been a boundary marker. For the Ancient Egyptians it marked the northern extremity of Amurru, the region north of Phoenicia. During the Late Bronze Age, the Orontes Valley was home to several important Syrian kingdoms and city-states, including Alalakh, Niya and Tunip. On the Orontes was fought the major Battle of Kadesh (circa 1274 BCE) between the Egyptian army of Ramesses II from the south and the Hittite army of Muwatalli II from the north. The river was also the site of the Battle of Qarqar fought in 853 BCE, when the army of Assyria, led by king Shalmaneser III, encountered an allied army of 12 kings led by Hadadezer of Damascus.

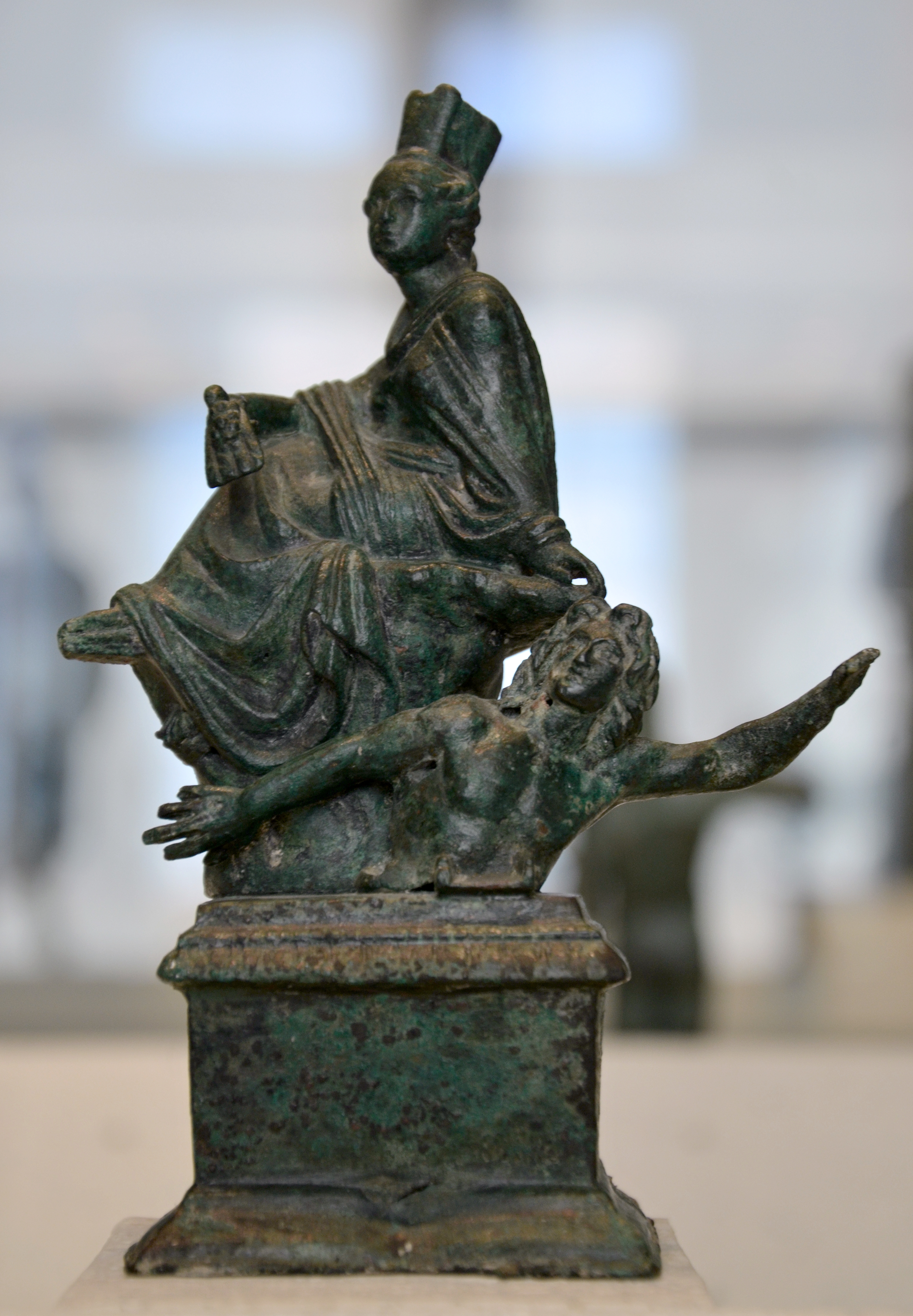
Bronze copy, 1st or 2nd century CE, from Tartus of Eutychides' Tyche of Antioch, 4th century BCE, Louvre Museum; at the goddess' feet a male swimmer personifying the Orontes is represented.

Alexander the Great acquired the river valley after the defeat of the Persians in 333 BCE at the Battle of Issus (fought on the Pinarus River near modern İskenderun and north of modern Antakya). After his death in 323 BCE, it became part of the Seleucid Empire. Seleucid cities founded on the Orontes included Seleucia ad Belum, Antigoneia, and Antioch. Several Hellenistic artefacts feature the Tyche of Antioch with a male swimmer personifying the Orontes at her feet.

In 64 BCE Pompey took the Orontes river valley and made it part of the new Roman province of Syria with Antioch as its capital.

In his collection Satires (III, 62), the early 2nd-century Roman satirist Juvenal uses the Orontes as a metonym for oriental cultural influence in Rome, writing that "the Syrian Orontes has long flowed into the Tiber".

Lake Homs Dam was built by the Roman emperor Diocletian in 290 CE. In addition to Lake Homs, further Roman dams and dykes would be built along the Orontes river around Apamea, to better irrigate the Ghab plain. In 198 CE the province was split with the lower Orontes in the new province of Coele Syria and the upper Orontes from Emesa (modern day Homs) south in Syria Phoenice. Emesa was later raised to co-capital of the latter.

In 637 CE the Battle of the Iron Bridge near Antioch was fought between the forces of the Rashidun Caliphate and the Byzantine Empire near the Iron bridge and won by the former which shortly took control of the whole of the river valley.

For the Crusaders in the 12th century, the Orontes River became the permanent boundary between the Principality of Antioch and that of Aleppo.

A diversion dam in Lebanon was 60% complete when Israeli airstrikes damaged it during the 2006 Israel–Hezbollah War.

The construction of a Syria–Turkey Friendship Dam was started in 2011 but postponed because of the Syrian Civil War. The war has also seen the siege of Homs from May 2011 until May 2014.

In summer 2025, the river basin faced crisis as rainfall dropped sharply and groundwater feeding the Orontes collapsed, the riverbed dried out in parts of northwestern Syria, thousands of fish died, and agricultural land was left fallow. In early 2026, the river continued to show extreme variability, as heavy winter rainfall caused water levels to rise sharply in parts of northwestern Syria, leading to flooding in areas such as Idlib countryside and Darkush, inundating homes and infrastructure and highlighting the growing instability of the river system after the preceding drought.

== In art ==
The French writer Maurice Barrès purportedly transcribed in Un jardin sur l'Oronte (1922) a story that an Irish archaeologist had translated for him from a manuscript one evening in June 1914 at a café in Hama by the Orontes.

== See also ==
- Al-Mina – archaeological site at the mouth of the Orontes
- Baalbek – a town and archaeological site just to the south of the source of the Orontes
- Tell Tayinat and Tell Atchana – archaeological sites near each other in Hatay
- Water resources management in Syria
