= Karasu (Hatay) =

River in southern Turkey

Coordinates: 36°15′10″N 36°12′14″E

The Karasu (Arabic: قره صو) or Aswad (Arabic: الأسود) is a river in the provinces of Gaziantep and Hatay in Turkey. For part of its length it forms the border with Aleppo Governorate in Syria. It joins the Afrin River at the site of the former Lake Amik. Its waters now flow to the Orontes River by a canal.
