= Afrin River =

Tributary of the Orontes River in Turkey and Syria

Coordinates: 36°19′29″N 36°15′40″E

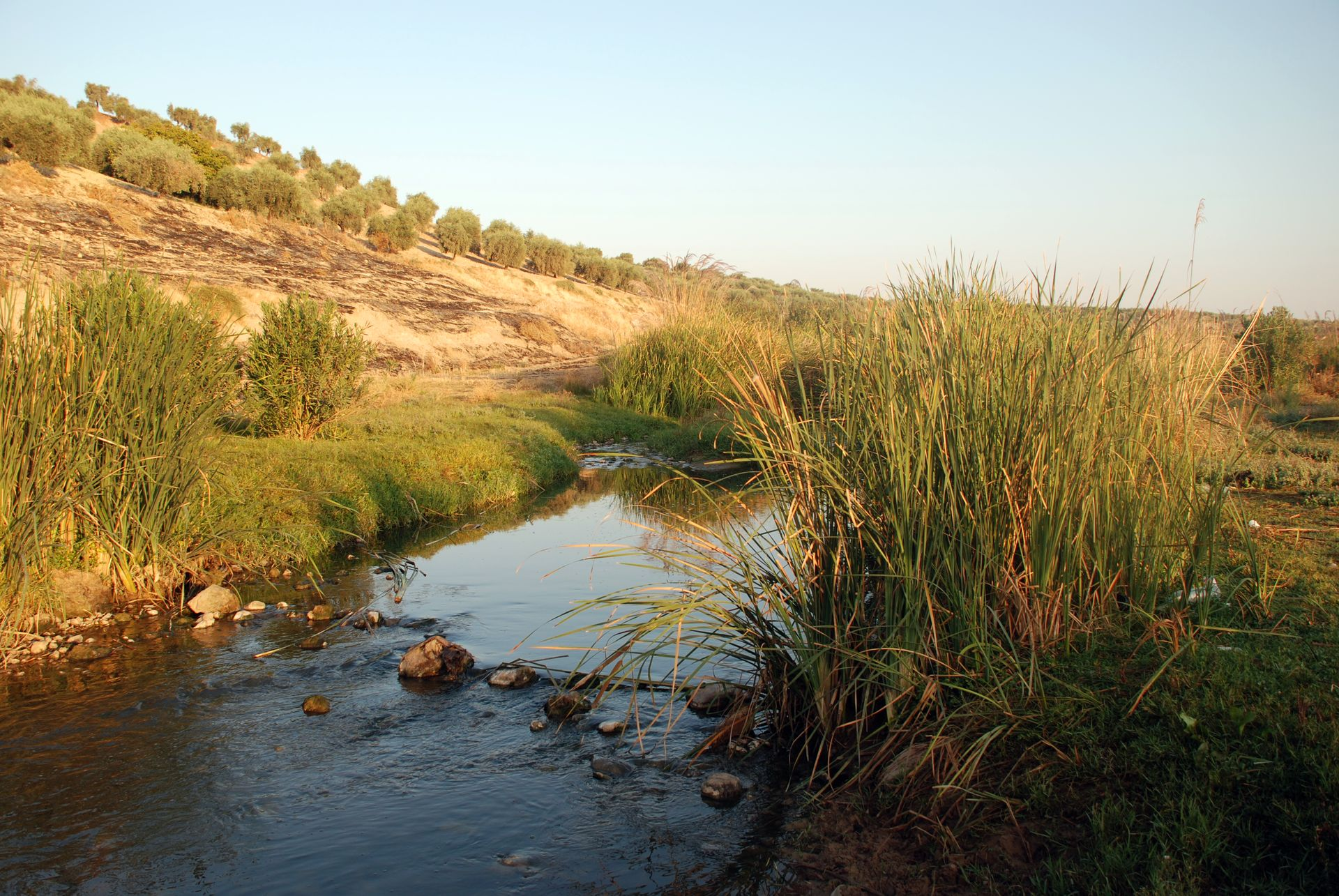
Afrin river south of Afrin, Syria

The Afrin River (Arabic: نهر عفرين Nahr ʻIfrīn; Kurdish: Çemê Efrînê; northern Syrian vernacular: Nahər ʻAfrīn; Turkish: Afrin Çayı) is a tributary of the Orontes River in Turkey and Syria. It rises in the Kartal Mountains in Gaziantep Province of Turkey, flows south through the city of Afrin in northwest Syria, then reenters Turkey. It joins the Karasu at the site of the former Lake Amik, and its waters flow to the Orontes by a canal.

The total length of the river is 131 kilometres (81 mi), of which 54 kilometres (34 mi) is in Syria. The source of around a quarter of the river water is in Syria. More precisely, about 250 million m^{3} (8.8 billion cu ft) of the annual flow of the river comes from the Hatay Province of Turkey, while about 60 million m^{3} (2.1 billion cu ft) originates in Syria. The river is impounded by Syria's Afrin Dam to the north of the city of Afrin.

The Afrin was known as Apre to the Assyrians, Oinoparas in the Seleucid era, and as Ufrenus in the Roman era. Abu'l-Fida mentions it as Nahr Ifrîn.
