= Liwa Umana al-Raqqa =

Syrian rebel group

- لواء أمناء الرقة
- Logo of Liwa Umana al-Raqqa
- Dates active: 20 February 2013–unknown
- Ideology: Sunni Islamism
- Part of: Ahrar al-Sham (2013); Euphrates Volcano (Denied by the group); Syrian Democratic Forces: Jaysh al-Salam
- Wars: the Syrian Civil War

Liwa Umana al-Raqqa, also known as the "Brigade of the Trustees of Raqqa", was an armed Syrian rebel group participating in the Syrian Civil War established in 2013 in the Raqqa Governorate as a subunit of Ahrar al-Sham.

== History ==
The group was established on 20 February 2013 by Ahrar al-Sham with local fighters from Raqqa to help keep a local image and legitimize the rebel offensive with locals in the Raqqa governorate against the Syrian government, which composed of many outsiders from the region, prior to the battle to take the city from the government and its allies. The group was also established with the purpose to act as Ahrar al-Sham's law enforcement in the city, and to help implement Islamic law and to administer areas taken from the government.

On 5 March 2013, the group assumed responsibility for Raqqa, and helped in forming ties between other allied armed factions and the locals of the city.

On 19 April 2013, Liwa Umana al-Raqqa published a video of the group distributing food and aid to locals.

During the group's presence in Raqqa they enforced Sharia and cooperated with Sharia courts in Raqqa and brought offenders to these courts to be penalized and prosecuted. One offender was reportedly beaten by members on the group on order from a Sharia court the group was working with.

The group's commander detailed that the group worked closely with Jabhat al-Nusra and held an alliance with them.

The group later came into conflict with the Islamic State of Iraq and the Levant along with other rebel groups based in Raqqa, including the Jihad in the Path of God Brigade, and Liwa Thuwar al-Raqqa, eventually coming together in an alliance with the armed branch of the Kurdish PYD party, the People's Protection Units (YPG). The group however denied it had joined the rebel-YPG alliance known as the Euphrates Volcano.

The group went on to join Jaysh al-Salam alongside the Jihad in the Path of God brigade, which later joined the successor to the Euphrates Volcano operation room, the Syrian Democratic Forces.
