= Battle of Tell Abyad (2016) =

Raid by ISIS

Coordinates: 36.6973°N 38.9551°E

- Part of the Syrian Civil War and the American-led intervention in Syria
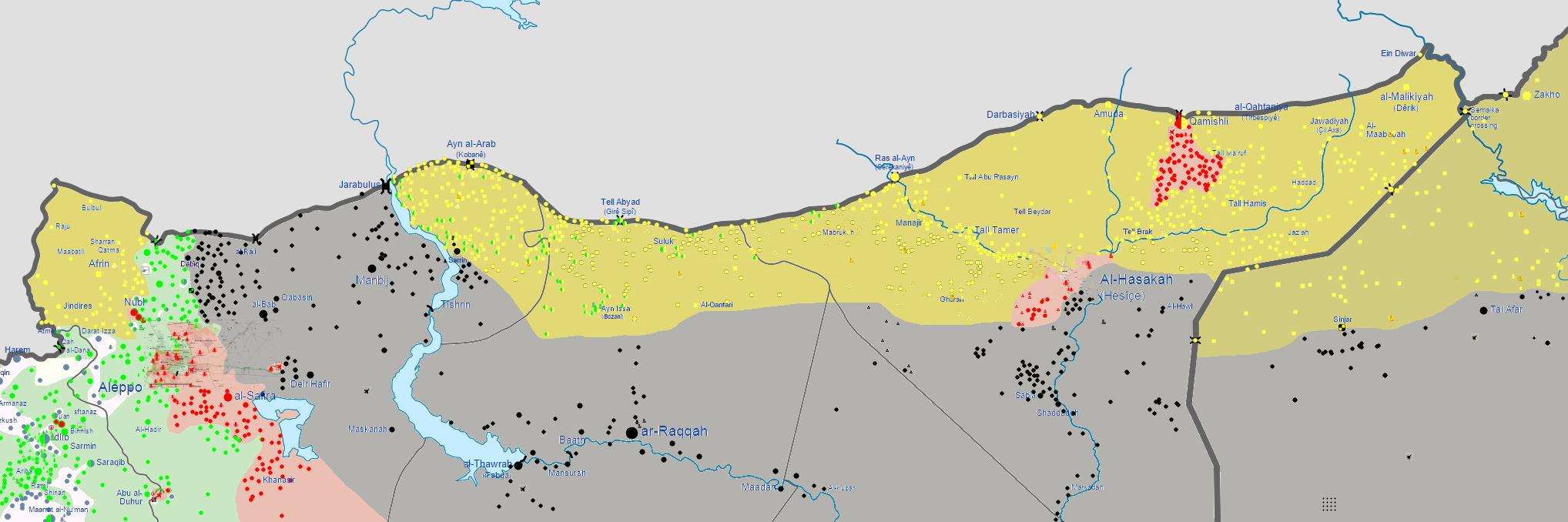
- Situation in Northern Syria (June 2015)
Date	27 February – 1 March 2016 (3 days) (First phase); 3–8 March 2016 (5 days) (Second phase)
Location	Tell Abyad, north of Raqqa Governorate, Syria
Result	SDF victory: The SDF repels the assault

Belligerents
Syrian Democratic Forces (SDF) Airstrikes: CJTF–OIR	Islamic State

Commanders and leaders
Khaled Daham al Bashir † (Deir Ezzor tribal leader) (Democratic Autonomous Administration of North and East Syria) Laila Mustafa (Head of City Council)	Abu Waheeb

Units involved
Syrian Democratic Forces: YPG; YPJ; Army of Revolutionaries; (Democratic Autonomous Administration of North and East Syria) Asayish & Kurdish militia	Military of ISIL: Dokumacılar; "Caliphate Cubs"; Tell Abyad sleeper cells

Strength
Unknown	400+

Casualties and losses
47+ killed (47 YPG/YPJ killed) 300 killed (ISIL claim)	120–291 killed
- 15–23 civilians killed

The Battle of Tel Abyad was a raid by the Islamic State of Iraq and the Levant on the YPG-held town of Tell Abyad at the end of February 2016, during the Syrian Civil War.

== Background ==
In July 2015, Tell Abyad, previously held by the Islamic State, was captured by YPG militias linking together the Kurdish Kobanî and Jazira Canton. Since then the majority-Arab town has been absorbed into the Kobane Canton.

== Battle ==
According to the Syrian Observatory for Human Rights, a month before the battle's beginning a large number of ISIL sleeper agents disguised as civilians and SDF or YPG fighters entered Tell Abyad. Most of them were so-called "Caliphate Cubs" or ISIL units of child soldiers.

On 27 February 2016, at around 23:00 local time (9 pm GMT), over a hundred Islamic State militants attacked the YPG controlled town of Tell Abyad (Gire Spi in Kurdish), a key crossing along the Syrian-Turkish border, just hours after a general ceasefire in Syria took effect. According to YPG military spokesperson Redur Xelil, the attack was not to re-take Tal Abyad but to cut the Kurdish Cantons in half and do as much damage possible, reminiscent to the Kobanî massacre.

The battle began when ISIL fighters infiltrated the suburbs of Tel Abyad, storming dozens of homes in the villages of Hamam Turkman and Ain al-Arous, and executing 23 civilians. A YPG spokesman claimed that some of the ISIL attackers of the Dokumacılar faction had crossed from Turkey to attack the town. Turkey quickly denied this claim. Russian Lt. Gen. Sergei Kuralenko the head of Russia’s reconciliation monitoring center in Latakia, said that the assault on Tal Abyad involved up to 100 armed militants with heavy artillery support from Turkish territory. Other YPG sources claimed that Turkey had supplied ISIL fighters with both modern western equipment and information.

The two pronged offensive was launched against the Kurdish positions in the East of the city, with ISIS using car bombs to attack checkpoints and mortar fire originating in Raqqa. The SDF headquarters in Tel Abyad was targeted and 5 other villages; Sharghrat, Kantari, Nastleh, Ghuwera and Qantrah were attacked. As ISIL overran large parts of the city, they also encircled a YPG headquarters near the Syrian-Turkish borders, where they captured Khaled Daham al Bashir. Khaled, who had fought ISIL with the Free Syrian Army in Deir ez-Zor before, was the cousin of Raghib al Bashir, head of al-Baqara tribe in the Deir ez-Zor Governorate. After his capture, he and three other SDF fighters were executed, with images of his beheading being posted by ISIL on his personal Facebook account.

During the battle ISIS fighters captured roughly 70% of the town (according to Turkish military officials) as well as the National Hospital and administrative buildings of Tal Abyad. Kurdish officials stated they were successful in repelling the attack and holding the town with the support of ten U.S Combined Joint Task Force airstrikes, and heavy reinforcements from mostly local Arab fighters from Jaysh al-Thuwar and the Euphrates Volcano, also part of the "Self-Defense Forces".

The offensive ended on 1 March, when the attack was repelled. According to the YPG, the bodies of 140 ISIS fighters were left behind. This toll was later raised to 291. The SDF gave their death toll as 43, mostly YPG fighters, and 23 civilians killed. The SOHR gave a differing death toll, in which 140 ISIS fighters died attacking the town along with 47 YPG and 15 civilians.

Mehmet Yuksel, a representative of the Kurdish Peoples' Democratic Party to the United States argued that Ankara hired the attackers from Syrian refugee camps in Turkey.

In response to the attack, the SDF launched "Revenge of Êlîn and Cûdî" (named after two Kurdish children in the Tel Abyad attack) on 3 March, the fourth major offensive against ISIS forces to the south that successfully reclaimed, with little resistance, open ISIL territory, hamlets and villages in southeastern Tell Abyad District, northern Deir ez-Zor District and western Al-Hasakah District. The two-pronged operation concluded sometime after SDF forces converged at Muqman in Deir ez-Zor District in 8 March, moving the Kurdish frontline closer towards the Islamic State stronghold of Raqqa and the ISIS-controlled city of Deir ez-Zor.
