= Raqqa campaign =

Raqqa campaign may refer to:

- Raqqa campaign (2012–13), battles between various Syrian rebel groups and Syrian government
- Raqqa campaign (2016–17), battles between the Syrian Democratic Forces (SDF) and the Islamic State of Iraq and the Levant (ISIL)
