= Jaysh al-Salam =

Syrian rebel group

Jaysh al-Salam Army of Peace
- جيش السلام
- Logo used by Jaysh al-Salam
- Leader: Abdul Karim Obeid ("Abu Mohammed Kafr Zita") (surrendered)
- Dates active: 23 June 2015—2016
- Groups: Liwa Ahrar al-Raqqa; Liberation Brigade; Free Tabqa Brigade; Harun al-Rashid Brigade; Tell Abyad Revolutionaries Brigades; Liwa Jund al-Haramain (joined in 2016); Liwa Umana al-Raqqa (dissolved)
- Headquarters: Tell Abyad, Raqqa Governorate, Syria
- Active regions: Aleppo Governorate; Raqqa Governorate; Hasakah Governorate
- Part of: Syrian Democratic Forces: Euphrates Volcano; Free Syrian Army
- Wars: the Syrian Civil War

Jaysh al-Salam (Arabic: جيش السلام, lit. 'Army of Peace') was an operations room of Free Syrian Army factions that operated in northern and eastern Syria with the goal of attacking the Islamic State of Iraq and the Levant in Raqqa.

As of the end of 2015 and the beginning of 2016, the coalition appeared to be defunct. Components of the group later joined the Syrian Democratic Forces throughout 2016. It was superseded by various other groups and military councils within the SDF.

== Ideology ==
During the founding statement of the Liberation Brigade on 12 September 2014, the group declared that they will be the "forces of democracy, chosen by the Syrian people" and vowed to defend liberty and preserve the unity of Syrian territory. The group also claimed that it will follow "strict military standards" in discipline and the selection of commanders.

== Groups ==
=== Liwa Ahrar al-Raqqa ===
The Jihad in the Path of God Brigade (Arabic: لواء الجهاد في سبيل الله, romanized: Liwa al-Jihad fi Sabeel Allah) is a rebel group that operated in eastern Aleppo Governorate. It was formed as a subunit of Liwa Thuwar al-Raqqa in September 2012, but later left the group. It fought the Islamic State of Iraq and the Levant in the eastern Aleppo province. The group acknowledges the Syrian opposition-in-exile government the Syrian National Council and the Supreme Military Council. The Jihad in the Path of God Brigade was a founding member group of the Euphrates Volcano operations room formed in September 2014.

The group was later renamed Liwa Ahrar al-Raqqa (Arabic: لواء أحرار الرقة, romanized: Free Raqqa Brigade), which then joined the Syrian Democratic Forces in March 2016.

=== Liberation Brigade ===
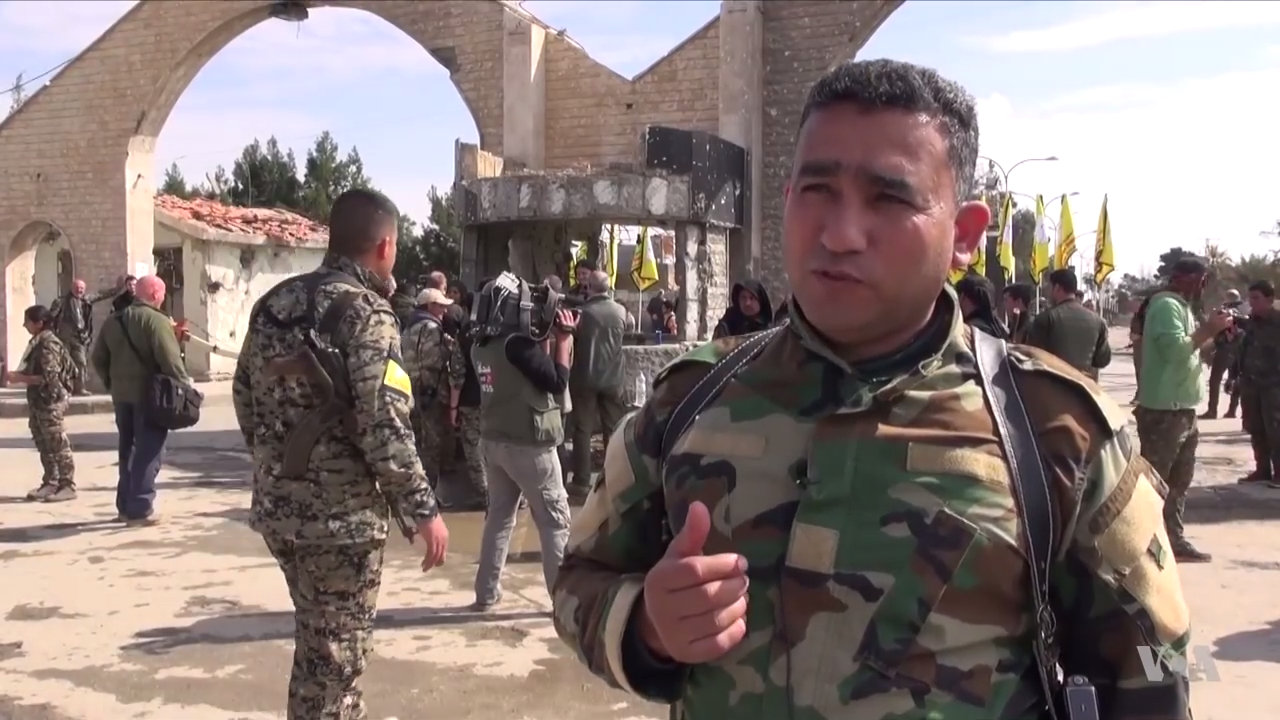
Abdul Karim Obeid, the commander of the Liberation Brigade, in al-Shaddadi after the offensive in February 2016

The Liberation Brigade (Arabic: لواء التحرير, Liwa al-Tahrir) is a FSA-affiliated rebel group that was formed in the city of Ras al-Ayn, part of the northern Hasakah Governorate, on 12 September 2014. Led by Abdul Karim Obeid, also known as Abu Mohammed Kafr Zita, a former commander of the Farouq Brigades, the group joined the Euphrates Volcano operations room in coordination with the YPG soon after its formation. In mid-2015, the group participated in the Tell Abyad offensive and jointly controlled the border crossing with Akçakale.

In early June 2016 the Liberation Brigade's commander, Abdul Karim Obeid, attended and spoke at the funeral of Abu Layla, who was killed during the Manbij offensive, in Kobane.

In September 2016 tensions flared up between the YPG and members of the Liberation Brigade due to the perceived marginalization of FSA and Arab components of the Syrian Democratic Forces, while SDF sources suggested Abdul Karim Obeid was displeased with the civil administration of the Democratic Federation of Northern Syria replacing warlordist political rule in the Free Syrian Army style. The group also refused to fight the Turkish Armed Forces and its allies during the Jarabulus offensive. In a video message to the United States, the group's commander, Abdul Karim Obeid, called for the SDF to be reformed into a united army under the authority of the United States Central Command and threatened to leave the SDF and withdraw from Tell Abyad if the YPG continued to dominate the coalition. As a response, the YPG imposed a blockade on the villages controlled by the group. Hours later, Abdul Karim Obeid and dozens of his fighters crossed from Tell Abyad into Turkey and defected to the Turkish Army. About 25 to 50 of them arrived in Jarabulus and joined pro-Turkish rebels fighting the SDF. The remaining fighters stayed with the SDF.

Since November 2016, the pro-SDF Liberation Brigade faction took part in the Raqqa campaign, including the Battle of Raqqa since June 2017.

== See also ==
- List of armed groups in the Syrian Civil War
