= Syrian Democratic Forces =

Alliance in the Syrian civil war (2015–2026)

- قوات سوريا الديمقراطية (Arabic); Hêzên Sûriya Demokratîk (Kurdish); ܚܝ̈ܠܘܬܐ ܕܣܘܪܝܐ ܕܝܡܩܪܛܝܬܐ (Syriac)
- Flag (2015–2026)
- Leaders: Mazloum Abdi (SDF general); Kino Gabriel (SDF spokesman); Ferhad Şamî (SDF spokesman)
- Founded: 10 October 2015
- Dissolved: 25 August 2026
- Allegiance: Democratic Autonomous Administration of North and East Syria (2015–2026); Syrian Democratic Council (2015–2026); Syrian transitional government (2025–2026, de jure)
- Group: List of groups (until 2026): Groups based in all of Northeastern Syria; People's Defense Units (YPG); YPG International Battalion; Women's Protection Units (YPJ); Anti-Terror Units (YAT, part of YPG & YPJ); Seljuk Brigade; Hammam Turkmen Martyrs Brigade; Special Forces Regiment; Sapper unit; Syrian Democratic Forces military councils; Hêzên Komandos; Martyr Haroun Units; Groups based in the Jazira Region & Deir ez-Zor Governorate; Syriac-Assyrian Military Council; Syriac Military Council (MFS); Bethnahrain Women's Protection Forces; Special Forces unit; Ashur Forces; Khabour Guards; Martyr Joel Hanna; Nattoreh; Martyr Nubar Ozanyan Brigade; Shammar tribe militias; Al-Sanadid; al-Shaitat tribe militias; Desert Hawks Brigade; Elite Forces (unclear); Saadallah al-Jabiri Battalion; Free Officers Union (unclear); Al-Baggara tribe militias; Harabiyya tribe militias; Zubayd tribe militias; Deir ez-Zor Military Council; Gathering of al-Baggara Youth; Martyr Amara Arab Women's Battalion; Groups based in the Euphrates Region; Tell Abyad Revolutionaries Brigade; Liberation Brigade (pro-SDF faction); Army of Revolutionaries; Martyr Qasim Areef Battalion; Jazeera Knights Brigade; Groups based in the Afrin Region, Manbij Region, and Aleppo city (including Sheikh Maqsood), withdrew to Manbij in March 2018; Army of Revolutionaries; Jabhat al-Akrad; Shahba Women's Front; Tel Rifaat Revolutionaries Battalion; Division 30 remnants; Homs Commandos Brigade; 99th Infantry Brigade; 455th Special Tasks Brigade; Tribal Forces; Northern Democratic Brigade; Shahba Forces; Battalion of Karachok Martyrs; Revolutionary Forces; Brigade For The Liberation of Idlib and Afrin; Idlib Revolutionaries Brigade; Wrath of Olives Operations Room; Afrin Liberation Forces; Sheikh Maqsoud Liberation Forces; Groups based in the Manbij Region; Manbij Military Council; Northern Sun Battalion; Manbij Revolutionaries Battalion; Al-Bab Military Council; Al-Bab Military Council Female Battalion; Jarabulus Military Council; Groups based in the Raqqa District & Tabqa District; Liwa Ahrar al-Raqqa; Raqqa Hawks Brigade; Martyr Tasleem Jimmo Brigade; Ghanim group; Raqqa Martyrs Brigade; Liwa Owais al-Qorani remnants; Ajeel tribe militias; Free Raqqa Brigade; Free Tabqa Brigade; Umanaa al-Raqqa Brigade; Harun al-Rashid Brigade
- Headquarters: Qamishli, Al-Hasakah, Syria
- Active regions: Northern Syria; Aleppo Governorate; Hasakah Governorate; Raqqa Governorate; Deir ez-Zor Governorate
- Ideology: List of ideologies: Democracy; Decentralization; Secularism; Regionalism; Socialism; Libertarian socialism; Democratic confederalism; Ethnic minority rights; Kurdish minority interests; Assyrian minority interests; Jineology; Pro-SDF Syrian opposition; Kurdish nationalism
- Status: Dissolved, merged into the Syrian Armed Forces
- Size: 100,000 (2021 estimate); 50,000–100,000 (2025 estimate)
- Wars: Syrian civil war: Rojava conflict; Battle of Aleppo; Rojava–Islamist conflict; US intervention in the Syrian civil war; Al-Hawl offensive; Tishrin Dam offensive; Northern Aleppo offensive (February 2016); Al-Shaddadi offensive (2016); Battle of Tell Abyad (2016); Northern Raqqa offensive; 2016 Aleppo campaign; Manbij offensive (2016); Battle of al-Hasakah (2016); Raqqa offensive (2016–2017); Battle of Tabqa Dam (2017); Battle of Raqqa (2017); Deir ez-Zor campaign (2017–2019); Battle of Khasham; Deir ez-Zor Governorate clashes; Eastern Syria insurgency; Deir ez-Zor clashes (2023); Arab tribal insurgency in Eastern Syria; Battle of Qamishli (2021); Battle of al-Hasakah (2022); 2024 Syrian opposition offensives; Battle of Aleppo (2024); Deir ez-Zor offensive (2024); SDF–Syrian transitional government clashes (2025–2026); Kurdish-Turkish conflict (2015-2025); Operation Euphrates Shield; Operation Olive Branch; 2018 Syrian–Turkish border clashes; 2019 Turkish offensive into north-eastern Syria; Turkish offensive into northeastern Syria (2024–2025); Operation Dawn of Freedom; Manbij offensive (2024); 2024 Kobani clashes; East Aleppo offensive (2024–2025)

The Syrian Democratic Forces (SDF) (Note: In the local languages: Kurdish: حێزێن سوریا دەمۆکراتیک, romanized: Hêzên Sûriya Demokratîk, pronounced [heːzeːn suːɾja: de:mo:kɾa:tiːk]; Arabic: قوات سوريا الديمقراطية, romanized: quwwāt sūriyyā ad-dīmuqrāṭiyya, pronounced [quwːaːt suːrijːaː adːiːmuqraːtˤijːa]; Syriac: ܚܝ̈ܠܘܬܐ ܕܣܘܪܝܐ ܕܝܡܩܪܛܝܬܐ, romanized: Ḥaylawotho d'Suriya Demoqraṭoyto.) was a Kurdish-led coalition of left-wing ethnic militias and rebel groups, which served as the official military wing of the Democratic Autonomous Administration of North and East Syria (DAANES; also unofficially known as Rojava) from 2015 to 2026. Founded on 10 October 2015, the stated mission of the SDF was to create a secular, democratic, and federalized Syria. The SDF was opposed by Turkey, who viewed the group as an extension of the Kurdistan Workers' Party (PKK), which is internationally designated a terrorist group.

Formed as a rebel alliance in the Syrian civil war with American support, the SDF was composed primarily of Kurdish, Arab, and Assyrian/Syriac, as well as some smaller Armenian, Turkmen, and Chechen forces. It was militarily led by the People's Protection Units (YPG), a Kurdish militia designated as a terrorist group by both Turkey and Qatar. The SDF included several ethnic militias and various factions of the Syrian opposition's Free Syrian Army.

Opponents of the SDF included various Islamist, Syrian nationalist, and pro-Turkish forces involved in the civil war. Major enemies included al-Qaeda affiliates, the Islamic State (IS), the Syrian National Army (TFSA), the Turkish Armed Forces, and their allies. Up to 2019, the SDF focused primarily on ISIL, successfully driving them from important strategic areas such as Al-Hawl, Shaddadi, Tishrin Dam, Manbij, Tabqa, Euphrates Dam, Mansoura Dam, and ISIL's former capital of Raqqa. In March 2019, the SDF announced the total territorial defeat of ISIL in Syria, with the SDF taking control of the last stronghold in Baghuz. After that, the SDF was increasingly involved in combatting the TFSA and Turkish presence in northern Syria.

On 10 March 2025, the SDF agreed to integrate into Syrian state institutions under the Syrian caretaker government. In January 2026, the Syrian transitional government launched an offensive against the SDF in northeastern Syria. On 18 January, a 14-point ceasefire agreement with the SDF, negotiated through the US envoy Tom Barrack, was announced, under which the SDF started integrating into the Syrian government, and the governorates of Raqqa and Deir ez-Zor immediately handed over to the government, together with the administration of prisoner-of-war camps for Islamic State members, all border crossings and oil fields. On 25 August 2026, SDF commander-in-chief Mazloum Abdi declared the SDF's dissolution, and its complete integration into the Syrian Army.

== History ==
=== Establishment ===
==== Foundation ====
The establishment of the SDF was announced on 11 October 2015 during a press conference in al-Hasakah. The alliance built on longstanding previous cooperation between the founding partners. While the People's Protection Units (Yekîneyên Parastina Gel, YPG) and the Women's Protection Units (Yekîneyên Parastina Jin, YPJ) had been operating throughout the regions of the Autonomous Administration of North and East Syria, the other founding partners were more geographically focused.

Geographically focused on the Euphrates Region were the YPG's partners in the Euphrates Volcano joint operations room, several mainstream Syrian rebel factions of the Free Syrian Army, who had helped defend the Kurdish town of Kobanî during the Siege of Kobanî. Liwa Thuwwar al-Raqqa had been expelled by the al-Nusra Front and ISIL from the city of Raqqa for its alliance with the YPG. The group participated in the capture of Tell Abyad from the Islamic State.

Geographically focused on the Jazira Region in northeast Syria were the Assyrian Syriac Military Council (Mawtbo Fulhoyo Suryoyo, MFS) and the al-Sanadid Forces of the Arab Shammar tribe, both of whom had cooperated with the YPG in fighting ISIL since 2013. The MFS is further politically aligned with the YPG via their shared secular ideology of democratic confederalism, which in the Assyrian community is known as the Dawronoye movement.

Geographically focused on the Manbij Region was the Army of Revolutionaries (Jaysh al-Thuwar, JAT), originally an alliance within the FSA of several groups of diverse ethnic and political backgrounds, who had in common that they had been rejected by the mainstream Syrian opposition for their secular, anti-Islamist views and affiliations.

In 2017, then-Commander of U.S. Special Operations Command Raymond Thomas stated that they were aware of Turkey's concerns about the YPG's ties to the PKK since 2015. For this reason, it was necessary for YPG to change their name and incorporate the word "democratic". Thomas explained that this is how the name Syrian Democratic Forces came to be.

==== Signatory groups ====
The following groups signed the founding document:

1. People's Protection Units (Yekîneyên Parastina Gel, YPG)
2. Women's Protection Units (Yekîneyên Parastina Jin, YPJ)
3. Al-Sanadid Forces
4. Syriac Military Council (Mawtbo Fulhoyo Suryoyo, MFS)
5. Liwa Thuwar al-Raqqa
6. Euphrates Volcano
7. Army of Revolutionaries (Jaysh al-Thuwar, JAT)
  1. 99th Infantry Brigade
8. Brigade Groups of al-Jazira

==== Political representation ====
On 10 December 2015, after a two-day conference, the Syrian Democratic Council was established. Human rights activist Haytham Manna and Ilham Ehmed were elected co-chairman/woman at its founding. The Assembly establishing the Syrian Democratic Council was made up of 13 members of different ethnic, economic and political backgrounds.

==== Ethnic makeup ====
Initially, the mostly Kurdish YPG/YPJ comprised the majority of SDF and dominated it organizationally. However, it has had smaller minorities of other communities involved in it from the beginning, including Christians, Yezidis, Turkmen and Arabs.

The participation of thousands of Arab troops fighting under the SDF, in its military councils as well as various militias and rebel groups, during the battle for Raqqa in 2015 initially made local Arab groups see that Arabs and the SDF could work together. This encouraged increased Arab membership at the time. By 2017, the SDF was reported by the United States Department of Defense to have an Arab majority. A 2019 Wilson Center study also suggested that a majority of the Syrian Democratic Forces' personnel are Arabs. The study was based on a representative survey with 391 SDF fighters; of the total respondents, 68.7% were Arabs, 17.2% Kurds, 12.5% Christians, 0.9% Yezidis, and 0.6% Turkmens. By comparison, the SDF itself estimated at the time that 50–70% of its troops were Arabs, 30–50% Kurds, 5% Christians, 2% Yezidis, and 2% Turkmens. Arabs comprised more than half of the SDF by 2019, and possibly earlier.

Unofficial figures, quoted in Al Majalla in 2021, similarly indicated a sizeable Arab majority, 65,000 out of 100,000 total. The Arab membership of the SDF may relate to the pay levels and conscription going on within the Arab majority Northeast Syria region, as the SDF has a mandatory 1 year of service for all men living in its area of control.

=== Size, growth and composition ===
In 2018, following a Turkish invasion into north west Syria, the SDF was forced from Afrin. In October 2019, the SDF had to retreat from Tell Abyad and Ras al-Ayn after a renewed Turkish invasion of Syrian territory. As of 2022, the SDF controlled about 25% of the territory of Syria.

==== 2015 ====
At the time of its founding in late 2015, The Economist described the SDF as "essentially a subsidiary of the Kurdish YPG". At the end of October, the al-Shaitat tribal militia, the Desert Hawks Brigade, joined the SDF to fight ISIL in the southern countryside of Hasakah Governorate. In November, the FSA group Euphrates Jarabulus Battalions announced its accession to the SDF. In December, members of the Deir ez-Zor Governorate-based Arab tribe al-Shaitat joined the SDF, sending fighters to al-Shaddadah.

==== 2016 ====
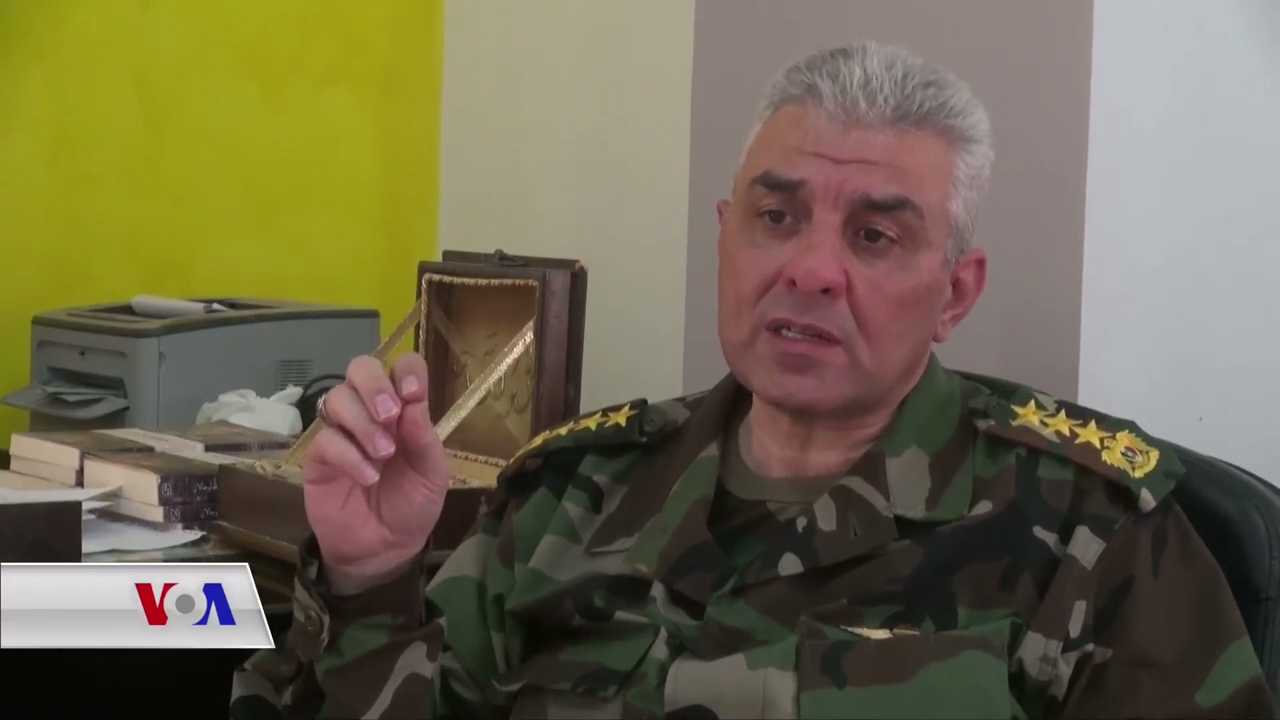
Hussam Awak, a former brigadier general in the Syrian Armed Forces who resigned in 2005 and joined the SDF in October 2016, later leaving in December 2017

With continuous growth in particular due to Arab groups and volunteers joining, in March 2016 only an estimated 60% of the men and women in the SDF fighting force were ethnic Kurds. Growth in particular of Arab, Turkmen and Assyrian participation in the SDF has since continued. In an interview on the first anniversary of the SDF's founding, spokesman Talal Silo, an ethnic Turkmen and former commander of the Seljuq Brigade, stated that "we started with 13 factions and now there are 32 factions", and that "90 percent" of the SDF growth since it began its operations were ethnic Arabs. In the context of the November 2016 Northern Raqqa offensive, The Economist said the SDF fighting force to be composed of "about 20,000 YPG fighters and about 10,000 Arabs". The next month in December 2016, Colonel John Dorrian, the Operation Inherent Resolve spokesman, stated that the SDF contained around 45,000 fighters, of which more than 13,000 were Arabs.

- On 6 January 2016 an additional 400 members of the Arab Deir ez-Zor Governorate-based tribe al-Shaitat joined the SDF, sending fighters to Al-Shaddadah.
- On 5 February 2016, a group called Martyrs of Dam Brigade from an Arab village called al-Makhmar (liberated by the Syrian Democratic Forces in the Tishrin Dam offensive) joined the Northern Sun Battalion and the SDF.
- On 28 February 2016, a group called Martyr Qasim Areef Battalion from Sarrin was formed and joined the Army of Revolutionaries and the SDF.
- On 10 March 2016, a group called the Soldiers of the Two Holy Mosques Brigade joined the Syrian Democratic Forces as part of the Northern Sun Battalion. It was formerly part of the Army of Mujahideen's 19th Division. The group operated in the northern Aleppo Governorate countryside, and also have a presence in Aleppo city and Kobani.
- On 12 March 2016, it was reported that more than 200 locals from the earlier liberated areas around the town of Shaddadi joined the SDF, most of them Arabs.
- On 19 March 2016, it was reported that a group under the name of Liwa Ahrar al-Raqqa ("Free Raqqa Brigade") joined the SDF. The group had earlier been known under the name of Liwa al-Jihad fi Sabeel Allah ("Jihad in the Path of God Brigade") and had in September 2014 been part of the Euphrates Volcano operations room.
- On 2 April 2016 the SDF established the Manbij Military Council with the goal of securing the city of Manbij and its surrounding countryside (Manbij offensive (2016)). The council also included previously unknown groups such as the Manbij Revolutionaries Battalion, or the Manbij Turkmen Brigade which joined the Northern Sun Battalion of the Army of Revolutionaries.
- On 20 June 2016, a group called the Tel Rifaat Revolutionaries Battalion, with 250 members, joined the Kurdish Front of the Army of Revolutionaries.
- On 23 June 2016 in the al-Shaddadah area, 158 al-Shaitat tribesmen from the FSA group Elite Forces, which was not yet an SDF component group at the time, defected to join the SDF component group, the Desert Hawks Brigade, consisting of members of that tribe.
- On 14 August 2016, after securing Manbij, the SDF established the al-Bab Military Council with the goal of securing the city of al-Bab and its surrounding countryside.
- On 21 August, in a similar fashion to the establishment of the Manbij and al-Bab Military Councils, the SDF established the Jarablus Military Council with the goal of securing the city of Jarablus and its surrounding countryside. The council also includes the newly established group, the Manbij Revolutionary Brigades. The commander of the council, General Sattar Jader from Jarabulus Hawks Brigades, was assassinated the next day, a suspect was later arrested.
- On 13 September 2016 the al-Nukhbat Brigade, consisting of members from the al-Shaitat and Shammar tribes and led by Ahmad Jarba, joined the SDF. While some of its members already had earlier defected and joined the SDF, the event was called a major political coup for the SDF, as Jarba was the former President of the National Coalition for Syrian Revolutionary and Opposition Forces and now agreed to work with the Syrian Democratic Council framework instead.
- On 14 October 2016, the Free Officers Union, led by Hussam Awak, said to number in the hundreds joined the SDF.
- On 31 October 2016, an all-female battalion was established within' the al-Bab Military Council.
- On 8 December 2016, the Deir ez-Zor Military Council was established. The founding members consisted of remnants of the former Free Syrian Army council of the same name, expelled from the city by the Islamic State in 2014, having joined the SDF in November 2016.

==== 2017 ====
According to a March 2017 statement of the Spokesman for the International Coalition forces, U.S. Colonel John Dorrian, 75 percent of the SDF forces fighting in Operation Wrath of Euphrates to isolate ISIL's de facto capital of Raqqa were Syrian Arabs, a reflection of the demographic composition of that area. "The Syrian Democratic Forces are a multi-ethnic and multi-sectarian organization, and that is one of the reasons why we're working with them and they have continued to build the Arab element of their force." Concerning the SDF in general, Lieutenant General Stephen Townsend in the same month said that "I'm seeing what is probably a pretty broad coalition of people and the Kurds may be providing the leadership, because they have a capable leader who's stepped up to this challenge. And they are providing some of the organisational skill, but I see a large contingent about 23 to 25,000 so far and growing, Arabs, who are marching to liberate their part of northern Syria. So, I don't see a Kurdish state. I see a multi-cultural, multi-party, multi-ethnic, multi-sectarian Syrian region being liberated from ISIS."

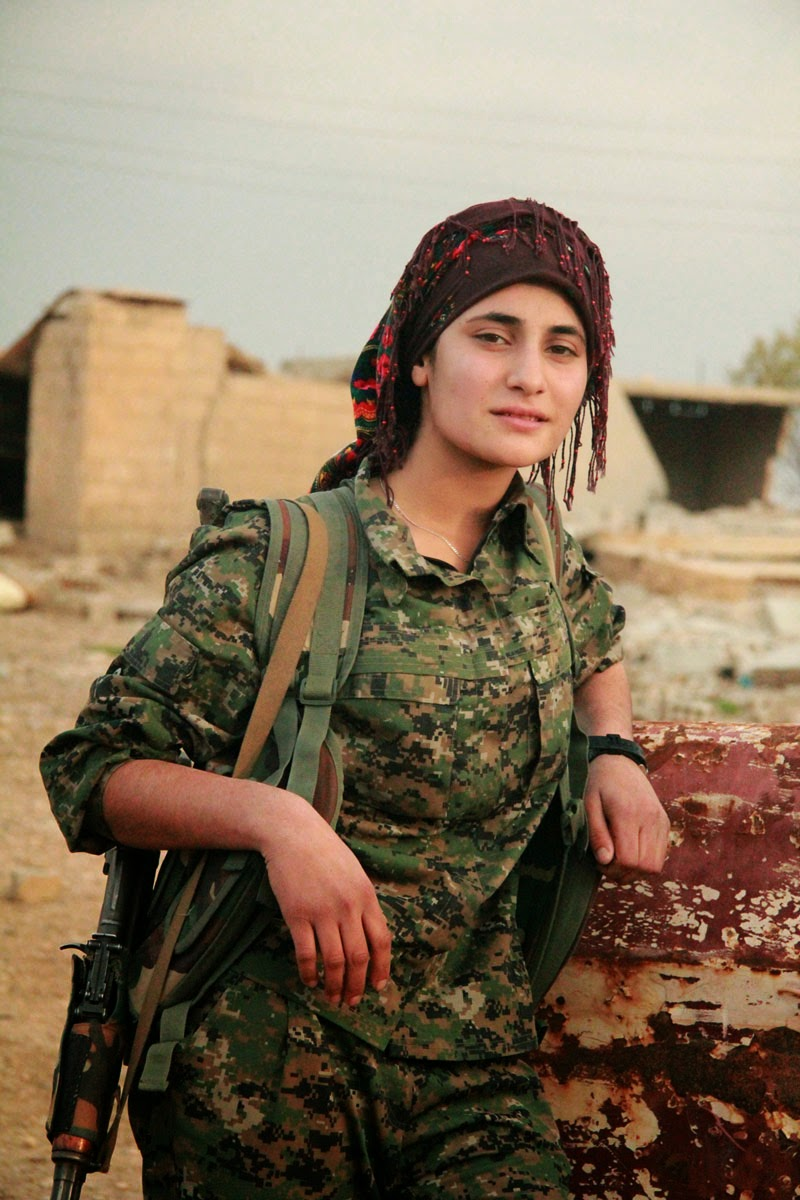
YPJ fighter in 2014

In late June, an analysis by the Counter Terrorism Center at West Point proclaimed a "growing acceptance of the SDF by Sunni Arab rebel groups" and a "growing legitimacy of the SDF". Another analysis as of late June described the YPG as "only one faction of many within the SDF", however that "it's the YPG that makes the SDF reliable and effective. The SDF's other components function as auxiliaries to the SDF's 'backbone', the YPG, which ensures effective, unitary command and control."

- On 13 February, the first YPG/YPJ regiment in the Euphrates Region was declared. The second regiment, named Şehîd Şevger Kobanî Regiment was established on 18 February. A total of 4 regiments were declared.
- On 25 February 2017, the YPG agreed to hand over security in the Assyrian towns along the Khabur River to the Khabour Guards and Nattoreh which joined the SDF.
- On 27 February 2017, the first YPG/YPJ regiment in the Afrin Region, named Martyr Xebat Dêrik Regiment, was declared.
- On 8 April 2017, the Jazeera Knights Brigade was established.
- On 10 April 2017, two new YPG/YPJ regiments, named Martyr Gabar Regiment and Dêrik and Martyr Zana Regiment were established in the Jazira Region.
- On 4 May 2017, the International Anti-Fascist Battalion was renamed to the YPG International Battalion and became a part of the YPG.
- On 17 May 2017, the Raqqa Internal Security Forces were established.
- On 8 June, between 60 and 70 Turkish-backed Free Syrian Army fighters, including several Sultan Murad Division commanders, defected to the Syrian Army and the SDF during infighting between TFSA factions.
- On 10 July, an all-female Arab SDF group was established in Deir ez-Zor, the Martyr Amara Arab Women's Battalion, named after a female Arab SDF fighter that died in combat. Their area of focus will be the Deir ez-Zor Governorate. The group currently consists of 35 fighters from the cities of Hama, al-Raqqa, Deir ez-Zor and Hasakah, along with the town of al-Shaddadah.
- On 15 August, the Revolutionary Forces was formed as part of the SDF in northern Aleppo, with the intent to fight the Turkish occupation of northern Syria.
- On 25 August 800 fighters left the Elite Forces and were integrated into the ranks of the SDF and its Deir ez-Zor Military Council. The fighters said the Elite Forces were committing corruption. These forces consist of 7 units of al-Baggara and al-Shaitat tribal fighters stationed in the eastern Raqqa and southern Hasaka countrysides.
- On 4 September, a faction of the Northern Brigade, which is a TFSA unit, defected to the SDF.
- Around 10 September, dozens of militiamen of the pro-government Forces of the Fighters of the Tribes joined the SDF. These militiamen had previously been overrun by ISIL during the Central Syria campaign and retreated into SDF-held areas in order to avoid being captured by the Islamist militants. Feeling abandoned by their old commander, they eventually decided to stay with the SDF.
- At some point during the Battle of Raqqa (2017), the "Elite Forces" fell out with the SDF, and officially left the alliance. Thereafter, the group reportedly disintegrated.
- On 15 November 2017, Talal Silo defected or surrendered to the Turkish Army, the nature of his leaving the SDF being up for dispute.
- On 27 November 2017, the Martyr Adnan Abu Amjad Regiment, consisting of 250 fighters was established and joined the Manbij Military Council
- On 20 December 2017, Hussam Awak announced his resignation from the SDF on his Facebook page without providing any reasons.

==== 2018 ====
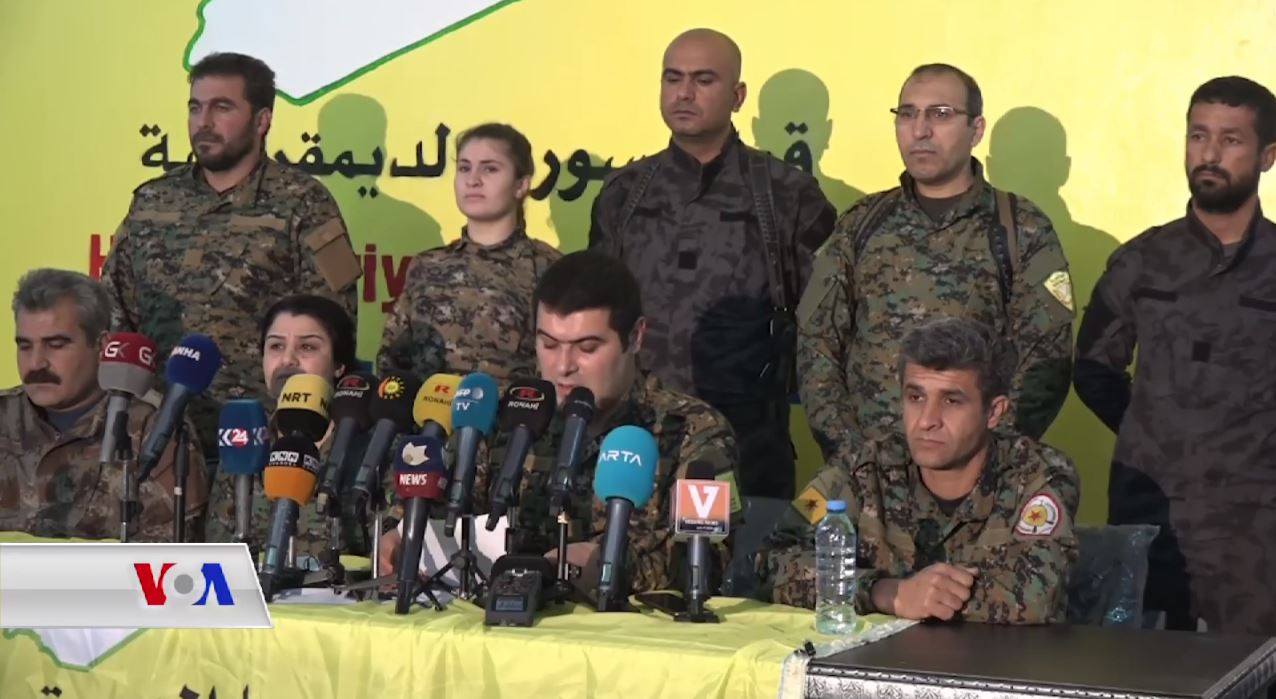
Press conference of the SDF on 22 January 2018, involving Kino Gabriel (center), spokesman of the SDF.

- On 13 January 2018, it was announced that the US-led Coalition would train a group called the Syrian Border Security Force (BSF), and would aim to reach 30,000 fighters, half of those being composed by current SDF members.
- On 20 January 2018, Kino Gabriel, the spokesman for the Syriac Military Council, was also made the spokesman for the SDF.
- In early June 2018, the Brigade For The Liberation of Idlib and Afrin, and the Idlib Revolutionaries Brigade where established.
- In July 2018, the first Sapper unit was established.
- On 1 August 2018, the first Special Forces Regiment was formed.
- On 24 September 2018, the Assyrian Democratic Party announced the creation of a united military leadership for Nattoreh and the Khabour Guards. The united force will be known as the "Ashur Forces".

==== 2019 ====
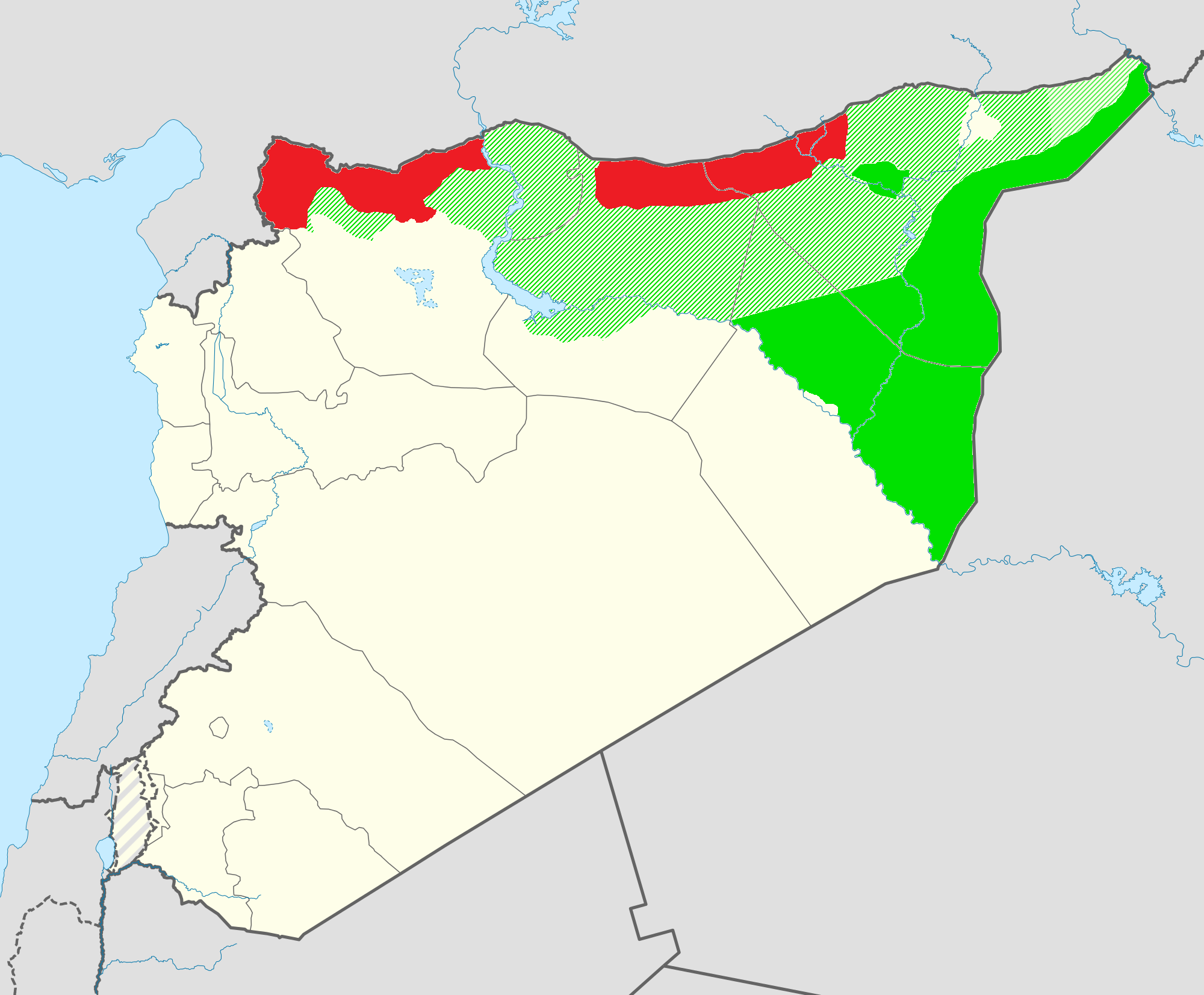
Map of Syria in October 2019. SDF-controlled territory (green) and territory it claims but which was occupied by Turkish troops (red).

- On 23 March 2019, the SDF announced the seizure of the last of ISIL territory in Syria after capturing the Syrian city of Baghuz.
- On 24 April 2019, the Armenian Martyr Nubar Ozanyan Brigade was founded in the Marziya Church in Tell Goran on the 104th Armenian Genocide Remembrance Day.
- On 6 July 2019, the MFS and Khabour Guards announced the formation of the Syriac-Assyrian Military Council in order to unify the Assyrian-Syriac military organizations within the Khabour region. The declaration said the military council would work within the political ideals of the Syriac Union Party and the Syrian Democratic Council.
- In June & July 2019, ten military councils were formed.
- On 9 October 2019, Turkey started bombardment on SDF territory. It followed with an offensive that Turkey called "Operation Peace Spring". US troops withdrew from the Syrian-Turkish border, leading to international condemnation of the invasion, with only Azerbaijan and the Central Asian countries excluding Afghanistan supporting the invasion.

=== Support by the U.S.-led coalition ===
- On 12 October 2015, the Pentagon confirmed U.S. C-17 transport aircraft dropped 100 pallets with 45 tons of arms and ammunition over SDF-controlled territory in the Autonomous Administration of North and East Syria. Polat Can, spokesman of the SDF component militia People's Protection Units (YPG), identified the freight as being "assault rifles, mortars and ammunition, but no TOW anti-tank missiles nor anti-aircraft weapons". The airdrop came only days after the Pentagon had officially abandoned its failed $500 million train-and-equip program that armed mainstream opposition groups who were also opposed to ISIL.
- During the SDF's February 2016 al-Shaddadi offensive, there were US special forces embedded with the SDF forces who coordinated airstrikes against ISIL with the SDF.
- On 17 March 2016, the day after the declaration of the Autonomous Administration of North and East Syria, U.S. Defense Secretary Ashton Carter praised the SDF component militia People's Protection Units (YPG) as having "proven to be excellent partners of ours on the ground in fighting ISIL. We are grateful for that, and we intend to continue to do that, recognizing the complexities of their regional role."
- During the SDF's May 2016 offensive against ISIL in Northern Raqqa, the presence of U.S. Special Forces was widely reported, and several photographs of them wearing badges of the YPG and YPJ on their uniforms circulated.

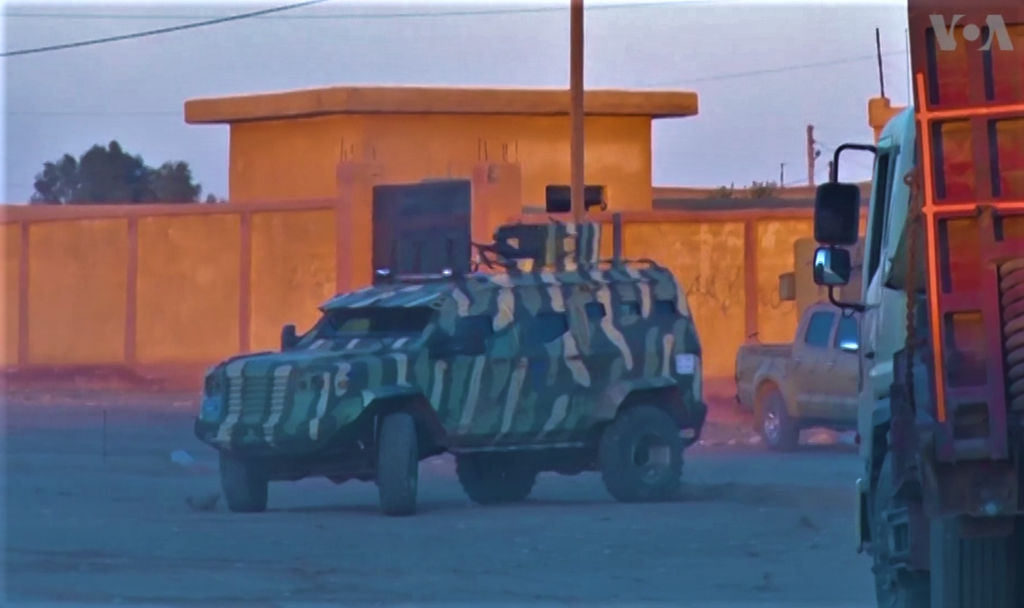
An SDF IAG Guardian armoured personnel carrier in February 2017, one of several APCs that were supplied by the United States to the SDF.

- On 21 May 2016, General Joseph Votel, commanding general of U.S. Central Command, completed a secret several-hour-long trip to northern Syria to visit several locations where there were U.S. special operations forces and meet with local forces the U.S. was helping train to fight ISIL. The visit came as the first of 250 additional U.S. special operations forces were beginning to arrive in Syria to work with local forces. The commander overseeing the war in Syria, at the end of a long Saturday spent touring SDF bases, said "We do, absolutely, have to go with what we've got".
- During the SDF's summer 2016 Manbij offensive against ISIL, the U.S. Air Force as well as the special operations forces of several Western nations supported the SDF advance. The Syrian Observatory for Human Rights stated that besides US special forces, German and French forces were participating. France later confirmed that it had sent its own troops into Syria in an advisory capacity to train the Syrian Democratic Forces to fight against ISIL.
- After two Syrian Air Force SU-24s started air strikes in Al-Hasakah, on 19 August 2016, near where coalition forces were conducting operations on the ground, coalition aircraft arrived and the United States Department of Defense said that "It troubles us when we see regime air strikes in Hasakah in an area where it is well known by everybody, to include the Assad regime, that the coalition is actively engaged in operations against Isis", implicitly recognizing that elite troops are training and supporting the YPG and the Syrian Democratic Forces in the area.
- During the late summer 2016 Turkish military intervention in the Syrian Civil War in the Manbij Region, U.S. Special Operations Forces embedded themselves with SDF forces to successfully deter Turkish-backed jihadi rebels from attacking SDF forces south of the Sajur river. Further, the United States Department of Defense confirmed that U.S. Special Operation Forces were flying U.S. flags in the town of Tell Abyad in the Euphrates Region to deter Turkish harassment shelling or attacks against SDF forces there.
- During the SDF's late summer 2016 Western al-Bab offensive against ISIL, the U.S. Air Force provided close combat support for SDF forces.
- In late September 2016, the U.S. spokesman for the Combined Joint Task Force – Operation Inherent Resolve (CJTF–OIR) confirmed that the SDF, including the YPG, is also part of the "vetted forces" in the train and equip program and will be supplied with weapons. The President of Turkey, Recep Tayyip Erdoğan, condemned this and stated that the SDF are "endangering our future".* Early October 2016, media reports highlighted construction work on another military airfield in SDF controlled territory for operations of U.S. air assets, in the vicinity of al-Shaddadah in the Jazira Region, in addition to the two airfields the U.S. is widely reported to already co-operate there: Abu Hajar Airport in Rmelan in the Jazira Region and one airfield at the village of Septe south of Kobanî in the Euphrates Region.

U.S. Army Stryker armoured vehicles drive through Qamishli and head to the Syria–Turkey border after Turkish–YPG April 2017 border clashes.

- In late October 2016, U.S. Army Lt. Gen. Stephen J. Townsend, the commander of the international coalition against the Islamic State of Iraq and the Levant, said that the SDF would lead the impending assault on Raqqa, ISIL's stronghold and capital, and that SDF commanders would plan the operation with advice from American and coalition troops. From November, more than 300 U.S. Special Operations Forces were embedded to train and advise SDF fighters in the Raqqa offensive.
- In January 2017, the European Syriac Union in Brussels requested the US to provide more support for the Assyrian and Kurdish components of the Syrian Democratic Forces. The US reportedly favoured the Arab components in the SDF, in April the MFS and the HSNB reaffirming the request for more support from the US.
- In late January 2017, the SDF received a number of armoured personnel carriers produced by ArmorGroup and supplied by the US.
- In February 2017, Stephen Townsend visited Kobanî. On 25 February, the US Central Command stated that it would continue to train and equip forces of the Manbij Military Council. During the East Aleppo offensive (February–March 2017), the US deployed troops and armored vehicles to villages near Manbij in an attempt to "deter" the skirmishes between the SDF and Turkey-backed forces west and north of Manbij.
- In late March 2017, the US delivered 30 more Guardian armoured vehicles to the SDF for use in the Raqqa offensive.
- In late April 2017, the U.S. just as in the summer 2016 once again deployed U.S. troops embedded with the SDF to the border between the Autonomous Administration of North and East Syria/Syria and Turkey, in order to deter Turkish aggressions against the SDF, which this time coincided with the SDF's breakthrough advances against ISIL in the Raqqa campaign.

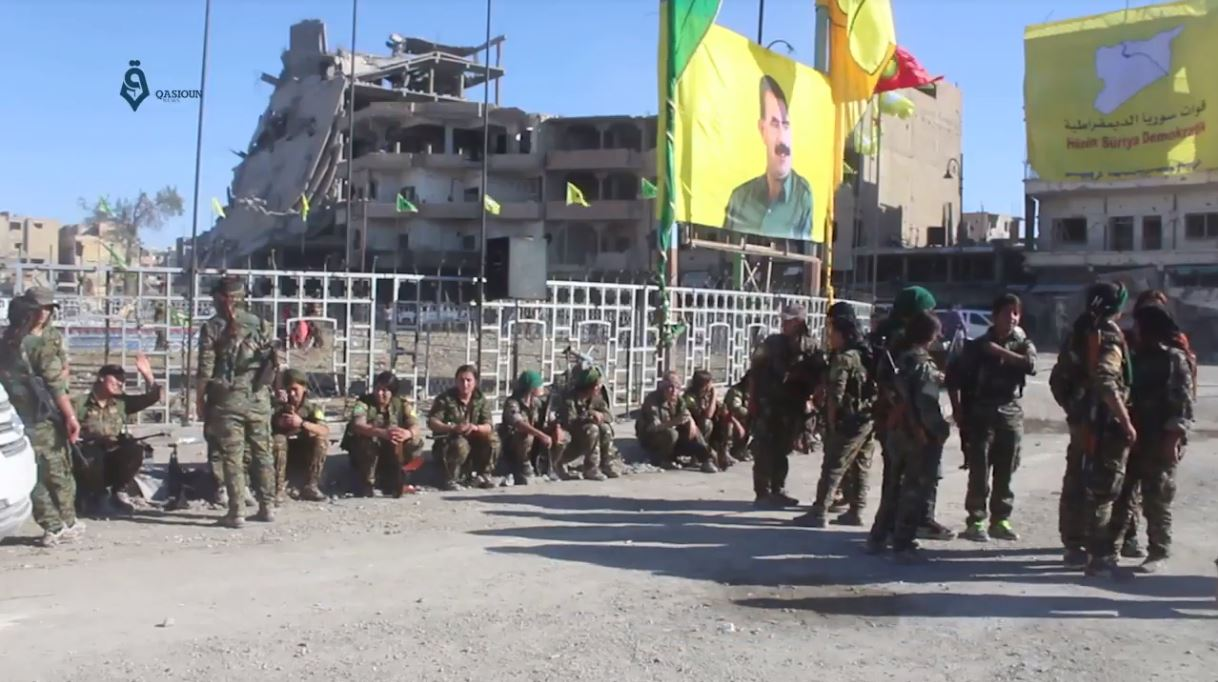
SDF fighters celebrating their victory in the Battle of Raqqa against ISIL with a portrait of PKK founder Abdullah Ocalan in the background, mid-October 2017

- On 9 May 2017, it was announced by the Pentagon that U.S. president Donald Trump approved of a plan that would have the United States directly provide heavy armaments to the major SDF component group, the YPG; the plan came before a planned final offensive to capture Raqqa from ISIL.
- By July 2017, more than 8,500 members of the SDF were trained by the US-led coalition and in the first half of 2017, more than 400 vehicles and other equipment were delivered to over 40,000 SDF troops.
- According to a report from the Kurdish news network Kurdistan 24, the major SDF component group, YPG forces, received about 800 truckloads of military supplies from the Pentagon from early June to the end of July 2017.* In a joint report published on 12 September 2017, the Organized Crime and Corruption Reporting Project (OCCRP) and the Balkan Investigative Reporting Network (BIRN) reported that the Pentagon had so far delivered up to $2.2 billion worth of weapons to the Syrian Democratic Forces.
- In late November 2017, Turkish officials stated that Trump told Erdoğan during their 24 November phone conversation that the U.S. would end arms supplies to the SDF. Erdoğan said: "For the first time in a long while, a common wavelength was reached." But Syrian Democratic Forces (SDF) denied on 28 November that there was a halt in the Washington armament, saying they were provided with weapons by the U.S. the day before. Kurdish officials also said on 27 November that the United States would only "adjust" its delivery of weapons to the SDF. U.S. officials also stated that they would continue to work with their Kurdish and Arab partners of SDF but will only review and adjust its delivery of weapons which is being done regularly. The International Coalition also confirmed its support for SDF is ongoing.
- On 12 February 2018, the United States Department of Defense released a budget blueprint for 2019 which with respect to the Autonomous Administration of North and East Syria, including $300 million for the SDF and $250 million for border security.
- On 29 March 2018, French President Emmanuel Macron vowed to send troops to Syria's Manbij in a bid to assist local SDF militias in preventing Turkish forces from advancing on the town.

U.S. soldiers of the CJTF–OIR coalition train SDF members in live stress-fire, mid-July 2019

- In December 2018, U.S. Kurdish allies in Syria discussed the release of 3,200 ISIS prisoners, a prominent monitoring group and a Western official of the anti-Islamic State coalition said, a day after President Trump ordered the withdrawal of all American troops from the country. The SDF denied that such talks have taken place.
- On 7 October 2019, in preparation for the 2019 Turkish offensive into north-eastern Syria, Trump announced that the U.S. would withdraw its troops that had been cooperating with the SDF and were stationed just south of the border with Turkey. This led to fears of a possible re-emergence of Islamic State of Iraq and the Levant due to SDF-controlled ISIS prisons and possible restoration of fighting in the Syrian civil war, in contrast to the limited level of fighting at the time.
- On 21 October 2019, while the Turkish offensive was still ongoing, President Trump announced that US troops would remain in Syria. Earlier, on 5 March 2019, Trump had stated that US troops would not leave Syria.
- As of 2023 the U.S. military and international coalition remain in Northeast Syria partnered with the SDF.
- The U.S. Department of Defense annually provides the SDF hundreds of millions of dollars in weapons, equipment, training and stipends.
- Following the fall of the Assad regime in December 2024, Kurdish-controlled city of Manbij in northern Syria, near the border with Turkey, after reaching a ceasefire agreement through US mediation. However, SDF fighters continued their “resistance” in the city. The Kurds control much of Syria's northeast under an autonomous civil administration. About 900 U.S. troops are deployed to Syria to support the Kurdish forces. On 8 December, the United States announced it had conducted one of the largest strikes against Islamic State targets in months. According to US Defense Secretary Lloyd Austin, the main priority is protecting American troops and preventing the resurgence of ISIS. The SDF was not part of the initial deal to consolidate rebel forces after the fall of Assad.

=== Reported internal conflict between SDF factions ===
- In November 2015, Liwa Thuwar al-Raqqa merged with the Tribal Army to form Jabhat Thuwar al-Raqqa to become part of the SDF. After some tensions between the group and the People's Protection Units (YPG), on 6 January 2016 the group reportedly issued a statement stating it was disbanding. Later the same month, some sources stated that the Liwa Thuwar al-Raqqa reappeared, announcing it had decided to rejoin the SDF.
- Turkey has at various times tried and failed to incite tensions along ethnic lines within the SDF. At the height of one such attempts after the start of the summer 2016 Manbij offensive, Sheikh Farouk al-Mashi, an ethnic Arab former member of the Syrian parliament and designated co-chairman of the Manbij City Council, stated: "I have a Syrian ID, and Kurds have a Syrian ID. Let those people who talk against us in Turkey and Europe come here and fight ISIS. Why this distortion in media about problems between Kurds and Arabs?" Ethnic Kurdish fellow co-chairman Salih Haji Mohammed stated: "In our social contract, we say we want to have good relations with neighboring countries like Turkey. Any country that does not interfere in Manbij and our areas, we will have good relations with." A fighter gave his perspective as "we have Arabs, Kurds, nobody knows how many exactly, we all work under the SDF-forces".
- In September 2016, during the Turkish military intervention in the Syrian Civil War, the leader of small SDF component group Liwa al-Tahrir, Abdul Karim Obeid, defected to the camp of Turkish-backed rebels with 20 to 100 of his men, citing opposition to reported YPG domination of the SDF, while SDF sources suggested he was displeased with the civil administration of the Autonomous Administration of North and East Syria replacing warlordist political rule in the Free Syrian Army style. The remaining fighters stayed with the SDF.
- Also, in September 2016, during the Turkish military intervention, some Arab sources reported that Liwa Ahrar al-Raqqa clashed with the YPG, however two days later the Liwa Ahrar al-Raqqa's commander said that news about the clashes and defections were false, he denied that such clashes had ever happened.
- In mid-November 2016, Liwa Thuwar al-Raqqa's political bureau, which has strong connections with Turkey, condemned the SDF's Raqqa offensive led by the YPG. This caused tensions between the group's political bureau, who opposes the YPG, and the overall leader and military commander of Jabhat Thuwar al-Raqqa, Abu Issa, who is allied with the YPG. Some members of Jabhat Thuwar al-Raqqa left the group and joined the SDF's Liwa Ahrar al-Raqqa, in response to the tensions.
- Infighting occurred between two SDF groups during the Raqqa campaign in December 2016, as several Jabhat Thuwar al-Raqqa military commanders were captured by and forced to announce their defection to the Raqqa Hawks Brigade. These commanders later announced in a video that they remained loyal to Thuwar al-Raqqa.
- On 20 February 2017, one sub-commander of the Raqqa Hawks Brigade, Abu Yamen al-Meko, who reportedly had strong links to the Military Intelligence Directorate, declared his loyalty to Bashar al-Assad and formed the pro-government unit "Tajamou al-Shamal". His followers consequently raised the Ba'athist flag at their headquarters in the village of al-Fares. These actions, however, provoked the ire of Jabhat Thuwar al-Raqqa, which launched a surprise attack on al-Fares two days later and destroyed al-Meko's faction, killing or capturing its members. Jabhat Thuwar al-Raqqa went on to declare that it "would never allow the regime and its supporting militia to re-enter the city [of Raqqa] by any means".
- On 26 August 2017, the YPG raided the headquarters of the Raqqa Hawks Brigade and captured Fayyad al-Ghanim, who led one of the group's factions. He was accused of coordinating with Syrian government forces but later escaped to regime-held areas.
- On 28 September 2017, Yasser al-Dahla, commander of the Gathering of al-Baggara Youth, part of the SDF's Deir ez-Zor Military Council, was arrested by SDF military police, which said Dahla was effectively participating in the SDF's Deir ez-Zor offensive and the "lack of military discipline". The Gathering of al-Baggara Youth denied these charges, and said the Deir ez-Zor Military Council was denying Euphrates Shield fighters who defected to the SDF to join the Gathering. Dahla reportedly threatened to cease his group's participation in the Deir ez-Zor offensive.
- On 15 November 2017, Talal Silo, who held the rank of brigadier general, surrendered or defected to the Turkish Army. His reasons for leaving the SDF are unclear.
- On 20 December 2017, Hussam Awak, another brigadier general, announced his resignation from the SDF on his Facebook page without providing any reasons.
- In May 2018, tensions began to build up between members of Arab tribes, including Liwa Thuwar al-Raqqa (formerly Jahbat Thuwar al-Raqqa), and the rest of the SDF and the Raqqa Internal Security Forces over recruitment issues in Raqqa. A curfew was put in place in both Raqqa city and the rest of the governorate on 23 June, as the SDF and RISF besieged Thuwar al-Raqqa's headquarters and arrested between 90 and 200 of its members the next day. By 25 June, the SDF and RISF captured all of Thuwar al-Raqqa fighters and their weapons in Raqqa, completely defeating the group, and the curfew was ended. Following Liwa Thuwar al-Raqqa's defeat by the SDF and RISF, Abu Issa met with tribal leaders and SDF officials to discuss surrender and reconciliation. He was reportedly offered a position in the SDF general command. Abu Issa would later go on to deny he was ever arrested by the SDF or the RISF.
- On 27 August 2023, the SDF arrested Ahmad Al Khubail, also known as Abu Khawla, who headed its Deir al Zor Council. This led to widespread unrest by various Arab tribal clans, fueled by poor living conditions and perceived favouritism towards the Kurdish population by the SDF. At least 40 fighters from both sides and 15 civilians died in the resulting fighting.
- On 7 August 2024, a Syrian Arab tribal coalition backed by Iran and the Syrian government launched an offensive against SDF positions in the Deir ez-Zor countryside, briefly capturing a number of villages on the eastern side of the Euphrates river before being pushed back.

=== Integration into Syrian government (2024–2026) ===
Syrian president Ahmed al-Sharaa announced the 14-point agreement on the ceasefire and the integration of the SDF, which was signed by SDF Commander-in-Chief Mazloum Abdi

After the fall of the Assad regime in December 2024, Mazloum Abdi met with Syrian president Ahmed al-Sharaa on 10 March 2025. Abdi announced that the SDF agreed that it will integrate into state institutions. However, on 29 March, the Democratic Autonomous Administration of North and East Syria also said it will not adhere to the decisions of the newly-formed transitional government, alleging that its composition allowed a single faction to maintain control and did not represent the diversity of Syria. Delays in implementing the 10 March agreement, with both sides accusing each other of obstruction, led to sporadic clashes between the two.

==== 2026 northeastern Syria offensive ====
In January 2026, the Syrian transitional government launched an offensive against the SDF in northeastern Syria. On 18 January, a 14-point ceasefire agreement with the SDF, negotiated through the US envoy Tom Barrack, was announced, under which the SDF is set to be integrated into the Syrian government, and the governorates of Raqqa and Deir ez-Zor immediately handed over to the government, together with the administration of prisoner-of-war camps for Islamic State members, all border crossings and oil fields.

According to the consensus reached between SDF Commander Mazloum Abdi and Syrian presidential envoy Ziad al-Ayesh, the majority of SDF members will be reorganized into three brigades and integrated into the 60th Division, led by Awad al-Jassem. In addition, a military brigade from Kobani will also be incorporated into a division in Aleppo Governorate.

On 20 August, during the centenary celebrations of the city of Qamishli Abdi declared that the integration of the military, security, and administrative institutions into the Syrian state had been completed and that non-Syrian fighters affiliated with the SDF had withdrawn.

On 25 August, Abdi, alongside YPJ commander Newroz Ahmed, and co-president of the DAANES Executive Council, Îlham Ehmed, travelled to Damascus for a day of discussions, following which Abdi gave a press conference in which he declared the integration of the SDF into the Syrian state and its formal dissolution. Numerous SDF units were not included in the deal and sidelined, as the Syrian Army refused to integrate the Women's Protection Units (YPJ) or any pro-SDF Arab units. Syrian Defense Minister Murhaf Abu Qasra claimed that allowing women to serve in the army was "against Islam" despite the anti-discrimination articles of the Constitutional Declaration and the fact that all neighboring Muslim states allowed women in their militaries. The YPJ subsequently held talks with the Syrian Ministry of Interior which demonstrated greater willingness to include armed women in its security forces.

On 20 October, the Kobani Brigade, formed of SDF fighters, completed its military training programme in Al-Nabk, Rif Dimashq, as part of the process to integrate military formations into the transitional government’s Defence Ministry. The end of military rehabilitation programs does not necessarily mean that all the operational details related to integration, including the organization of command and the distribution of tasks within the new military structure, have been resolved.

== War crimes ==
On 15 March 2017, a video surfaced that showed members of the Northern Sun Battalion reportedly torturing an ISIL fighter, who had been captured while planting mines. One of these mines had reportedly killed nine fighters of the battalion, leading five others to take revenge on the ISIL militant. The Manbij Military Council condemned the act and announced that the involved Northern Sun Battalion fighters would be held for trial for violating the Geneva Conventions. The five accused were arrested on 17 March.

On 24 April 2024, Amnesty International reported that there had been large-scale human rights violations of more than 56,000 people, including 30,000 children and 14,500 women, held indefinitely in at least 27 detention facilities for those with "perceived IS affiliation". According to the report among those held in this detention system are hundreds of Yazidis, Syrians, Iraqis, and foreign citizens from nearly 74 other countries. The report described the trials as "flawed", and many of the people in these camps were detained without charges. Detainees are held in inhumane conditions and subjected to torture including severe beatings, stress positions, and electric shocks with thousands having been forcibly disappeared. Women were also subjected to sexual and gender based violence by SDF security members as well as attacks by other prisoners for perceived "moral" infractions. Amnesty International's secretary general Agnès Callamard has accused the US government of playing a central role in the creation and maintenance of this system.

The Syrian Network for Human Rights (SNHR) found that the SDF was responsible for the deaths of 274 children and 859 children were forcibly removed or forcibly disappeared by SDF in its annual report on violations against children in 2024. It was also reported that the SDF had attacked 48 schools and kindergartens and 12 health institutions. Another report published by the same organization stated that the SDF was responsible for the deaths of 287 women and that 983 women have been unlawfully imprisoned by SDF. Another report said that the SDF had imprisoned 61 teachers for not following the curriculum and expelled 550 teachers for refusing to join the army. In another report published by SNHR, it was found that 3,417 people were arrested by the SDF and that no news was heard from them again. One of them, Syrian Kurdish opposition politician Amin Aisa al Ali, was detained by SDF forces without any legal justification. He was tortured and died in custody. His body was later returned to his family. In a report published on 6 February 2025, the organisation determined that the SDF had killed 65 civilians, including one child and two women, with sniper fire in the city of Aleppo in two months.

=== Ethnic cleansing and forced displacement allegations ===
In June 2015, Amnesty International released a report accusing the YPG of forcibly displacing and destroying the homes of civilians. The US State Department reacted by stating they would 'scrutinise' Amnesty International's accusations and that it had to determine if there was "any veracity to the claims", but showed concern by calling for any administrator in the area to rule "with respect for all groups regardless of ethnicity". The report makes accusations of looting, coercing civilians to join their armed forces and the forced targeted displacement of 1400 families in the Turkman villages of Hammam al-Turkman, 800 Turkmen from Mela Berho and Suluk residents. The report offers unnamed witness testimony from reported victims, cross referenced with photo and video evidence, media reports, and satellite imagery to substantiate these reports.

The Turkish government claimed that the YPG was carrying out ethnic cleansing of non-Kurdish populations as part of a plan to join the Jazira and Euphrates regions into a single territory.

In a report published by the United Nations' Independent International Commission of Inquiry on the Syrian Arab Republic on 10 March 2017, the Commission refuted Amnesty International's reports of ethnic cleansing, stating that "though allegations of 'ethnic cleansing' continued to be received during the period under review, the Commission found no evidence to substantiate reports that YPG or SDF forces ever targeted Arab communities on the basis of ethnicity".

In interviews, YPG spokespersons acknowledged that a number of families were in fact displaced. However, they placed the number at no more than 25, and stated military necessity. They stated that the family members of terrorists maintained communications with them, and therefore had to be removed from areas where they might pose a danger. They further reported that ISIL was using civilians in those areas to plant car bombs or carry out other attacks on the YPG.

=== Child soldiers ===
In June 2014, Human Rights Watch criticized the YPG for accepting minors into their ranks, picking up on multiple earlier reports of teenage fighters serving in the YPG. A report by the United Nations Secretary General stated that 24 minors under age of 18 had been recruited by the YPG, with 124 having been recruited by the Free Syrian Army and 5 by the Syrian Arab Army. In response, the YPG and YPJ signed the Geneva Call Deed of Commitment protecting children in armed conflict, prohibiting sexual violence and against gender discrimination in July 2014, and Kurdish security forces (YPG and Asayish) began receiving human rights training from Geneva Call and other international organisations with the YPG pledging publicly to demobilize all fighters under 18 within a month and began to enact disciplinary measures against commanders of the units that had involved in corruption and accepting recruit under age of 18 to their ranks. In October 2015 the YPG demobilized 21 minors from the military service in its ranks.

In response to reports issued by international organisations such as Human Rights Watch, the general command of the SDF issued a military order prohibiting the recruitment of children. On 29 June 2019, Abdi, as representative of the SDF, signed the action plan of the United Nations aiming to prevent the enlistment of child soldiers in the armed forces. The action plan was signed to address the inclusion of the YPG in the SDF.

== See also ==
- List of military equipment used by Syrian Democratic Forces
- List of armed groups in the Syrian Civil War
- Syrian Democratic Council
- Movement for a Democratic Society
- Democratic Union Party (Syria)
- Federalization of Syria
- Rojava conflict
- Democratic Autonomous Administration of North and East Syria
- Foreign relations of North and East Syria
- Relations with the Syrian government
- YPG–FSA relations
- SDF–Syrian transitional government clashes (2025–2026)

== Bibliography ==
- Rashid, Bedir Mulla (2018) [1st pub. 2017]. Military and Security Structures of the Autonomous Administration in Syria. Translated by Obaida Hitto. Istanbul: Omran for Strategic Studies. Archived from the original on 1 July 2018.
- Austin Holmes, Amy (2019). "SDF's Arab Majority Rank Turkey as the Biggest Threat to NE Syria. Survey Data on America's Partner Forces" (PDF). Middle East Program. 21 (16). Wilson Center.
