= Liwa Ahrar al-Raqqa =

Rebel group in the Syrian Civil War

- لواء جهاد في سبيل الله
- Dates active: 2012 – unknown
- Split from: Liwa Thuwar al-Raqqa
- Headquarters: Ayn al-Arab, Aleppo Governorate, Syria
- Part of: Free Syrian Army; Euphrates Volcano; Syrian Democratic Forces: Jaysh al-Salam
- Wars: the Syrian Civil War

Liwa Ahrar al-Raqqa, formerly known as the Jihad in the Path of God Brigade, is a Free Syrian Army unit active during the Syrian Civil War, originating from the Raqqa Governorate but also active in the eastern Aleppo Governorate. It became part of the Euphrates Volcano operation room in 2015 and remained part of the operations room as it expanded into the Syrian Democratic Forces.

== History ==
The group is part of the Free Syrian Army in the Raqqa Governorate, originating as a sub-unit of Liwa Thuwar al-Raqqa in 2012, and continued to hold a close relationship with Liwa Thuwar al-Raqqa working closely with the group. Though unlike Liwa Thuwar al-Raqqa it clashed frequently with the Islamic State of Iraq and the Levant, also unlike Liwa Thuwar al-Raqqa recognized the Supreme Military Council and the Syrian National Council and was officially linked with it.

The group was later completely expelled from the Raqqa Governorate by ISIL and was exiled in Kobani in the eastern part of the Aleppo Governorate later taking part in the defense of the city against ISIL, alongside other Free Syrian Army groups and the People's Protection Units (YPG), and went on to form a joint operations room called the Euphrates Volcano in 2014. The group was also allied with the Euphrates Islamic Liberation Front that, together with the Euphrates Volcano operation room, went on to form the Syrian Democratic Forces.

The group participated in fighting against the Syrian government during the 2012-2013 rebel offensive in the Raqqa governorate, alongside groups including Jabhat al-Nusra, ISIL, Ahrar al-Sham and other Free Syrian Army and opposition groups eventually leading to the ousting of the Syrian government from much of the governorate, including Raqqa city itself.

In July 2014, the group published a statement alongside Liwa Thuwar al-Raqqa and another group called the "Group of Battalions Jarabulus and its Countryside" which is a Turkish-aligned Free Syrian Army insurgent group operating in the Raqqa Governorate targeting ISIL by carrying out IED attacks, along with mortar strikes and minor clashes, asking for reinforcements to be sent by the Supreme Military Council in light of the growth of ISIL.

In 2015, the group joined Jaysh al-Salam and in 2016 changed its name to Liwa Ahrar al-Raqqa and officially joined the Syrian Democratic Forces.
