= Retribution Army =

- جيش القصاص; Jayš al-Qiṣāṣ
- Leader: Abu Ali
- Dates active: 2014? – mid-2015 (defunct?)
- Active regions: Aleppo Governorate, Raqqa Governorate, and Deir ez-Zor Governorate
- Size: ~500 (claimed)
- Part of: Euphrates Volcano (until June 2015); Free Syrian Army
- Wars: Syrian Civil War

The Retribution Army (Arabic: جيش القصاص; Jayš al-Qiṣaṣ) was a Free Syrian Army (FSA)-affiliated group formed by Deir ez-Zor natives that fought in the Syrian Civil War against the government and the Islamic State of Iraq and the Levant (ISIL).

== History ==
The Retribution Army was originally founded in Deir ez-Zor by Sunni Arabs and took part in the three-way battle for the city between loosely allied rebel factions, the Syrian Armed Forces, and ISIL. When the FSA units in Deir ez-Zor were overrun by ISIL in mid-2014, surviving remnants of the Retribution Army retreated north into areas held by the People's Protection Units (YPG). Eventually relocating to Kobanî Canton, the Retribution Army became a founding member of the Euphrates Volcano operations room in September 2014.

The group then took part in the defence of the town of Kobanî against the siege by ISIL, and continued to fight with the YPG and its allies until mid-2015. At the time led by Abu Ali, a former primary schoolteacher, they took part in the Tell Abyad offensive. After Tell Abyad was captured, however, disputes erupted between the Retribution Army and the YPG. Abu Ali later claimed that his men had hoisted the Syrian Independence flag over the city per a previous agreement, but it was taken down and replaced by the YPG banner. Feeling insulted, the Retribution Army then left Euphrates Volcano and went to Turkey. There, Abu Ali said in an interview that the Syrian Kurds are "like the devil", though admitted that many other FSA units remained allied to the YPG.

Though Abu Ali claimed that the Retribution Army would continue to fight in Syria at another front after "some much-needed rest", the unit has not resurfaced since.

== See also ==
- List of armed groups in the Syrian Civil War
