= Raqqa campaign (2012–2013) =

Series of battles in the Syrian Civil War

- Part of the Syrian civil war
- Top: Map showing rebel advances in Raqqa Governorate; Bottom: Map showing rebel advances in Raqqa city itself Syrian Army control Syrian opposition control Kurdish control
Date	19 September 2012 – 6 March 2013 (5 months, 2 weeks and 1 day)
Location	Raqqa Governorate, Syria
Result	Rebel victory: Rebels capture Raqqa, al-Thawrah, Tell Abyad, Euphrates Dam, and Mansoura Dam; Thousands of civilians displaced

Belligerents
Syrian Islamic Front; Al-Nusra Front; Islamic Unity and Liberation Front (JWTI); Free Syrian Army; Supported by: Qatar Turkey (border clashes)	(Syria) Syrian Arab Republic: Syrian Armed Forces

Commanders and leaders
(Syrian opposition) Mohammad al-Daher (Farouq Brigades commander); Dr. Samer (JWTI leader); Abu Wael (Jihad in the Path of God Brigade commander)	(Syria) Brig. Gen. Khaled al-Halabi (Raqqa state security head) (Syria) Maj. Gen. Hassan Jalili (POW) (Raqqa provincial governor) (Syria) Suleiman Suleiman (POW) (Raqqa provincial Baath party secretary general) (Syria) Abu Jassim (executed) (military intelligence commander)

Casualties and losses
At least 60 killed	At least 500 killed or captured

The Raqqa campaign (2012–2013) was a series of battles and offensives launched by various Syrian rebel groups, led by Ahrar al-Sham and al-Nusra Front, against Syrian government forces in the Raqqa Governorate as part of the Syrian civil war. The campaign was launched at the second half of 2012 and ended in the capture of the city of Raqqa as well as dozens of smaller towns and facilities.

== The campaign ==
=== 2012 ===
On 19 September 2012, Free Syrian Army rebels led by the Farouq Brigades captured the border town of Tell Abyad and its border crossing with the town of Akçakale in Turkey. The next day, the Syrian Air Force bombed a petrol station in Tell Abyad, killing 30 civilians and wounding 70. A rebel fighter was also mortally wounded. In October, Syrian government forces launched a counteroffensive in Tell Abyad which resulted in a border clash between Syria and Turkey.

On 12 October 2012, al-Nusra Front, Harakat Fajr ash-Sham al-Islamiya and "a group of Chechen fighters" attacked the Suluq barracks in Raqqa and claimed to have killed 32 Syrian soldiers.

In November 2012, both the rebels and government forces set up checkpoints on the road between al-Thawrah (Tabqa) and Aleppo. By the end of December, the majority of the Raqqa province were reportedly under rebel control, and rebel fighters entered al-Thawra.

=== 2013 ===
==== Battle of al-Thawrah ====
On 10 January 2013, heavy clashes erupted in the town of al-Thawra and the Syrian Air Force in Tabqa airbase shelled the town with artillery. By 11 February, rebels led by al-Nusra Front fully captured both the town and the Tabqa Dam next to it.

==== Battle of Raqqa city ====
On 6 March 2013, Sunni Islamist rebel forces fully captured the city of Raqqa from Syrian government, forces after a 3-day battle. The Syrian Army retreated to the military base of the 17th Division, to the northeast of the city.

== Aftermath ==
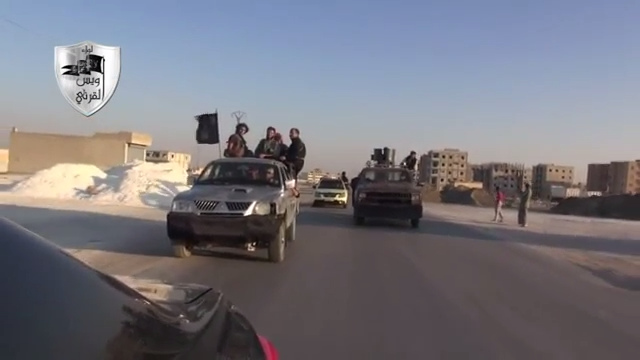
A convoy of vehicles of Liwa Owais al-Qorani leaving Tabqa and heading to Ayn Issa in June 2013.

Al-Nusra Front and Ahrar al-Sham implemented Sharia in the towns they captured. By April 2013, hundreds of Assyrians were displaced from al-Thawra. Christians, including those who supported the opposition, were kidnapped in Raqqa, al-Thawra, and Tel Abyad by al-Nusra Front and the Islamic State of Iraq and the Levant. ISIL also carried out public executions of dozens of people in the towns by firing squad. Political activism was also suppressed, several churches and mosques were burned, and hundreds of Armenians fled Raqqa.

== Order of battle ==
=== Rebel forces ===
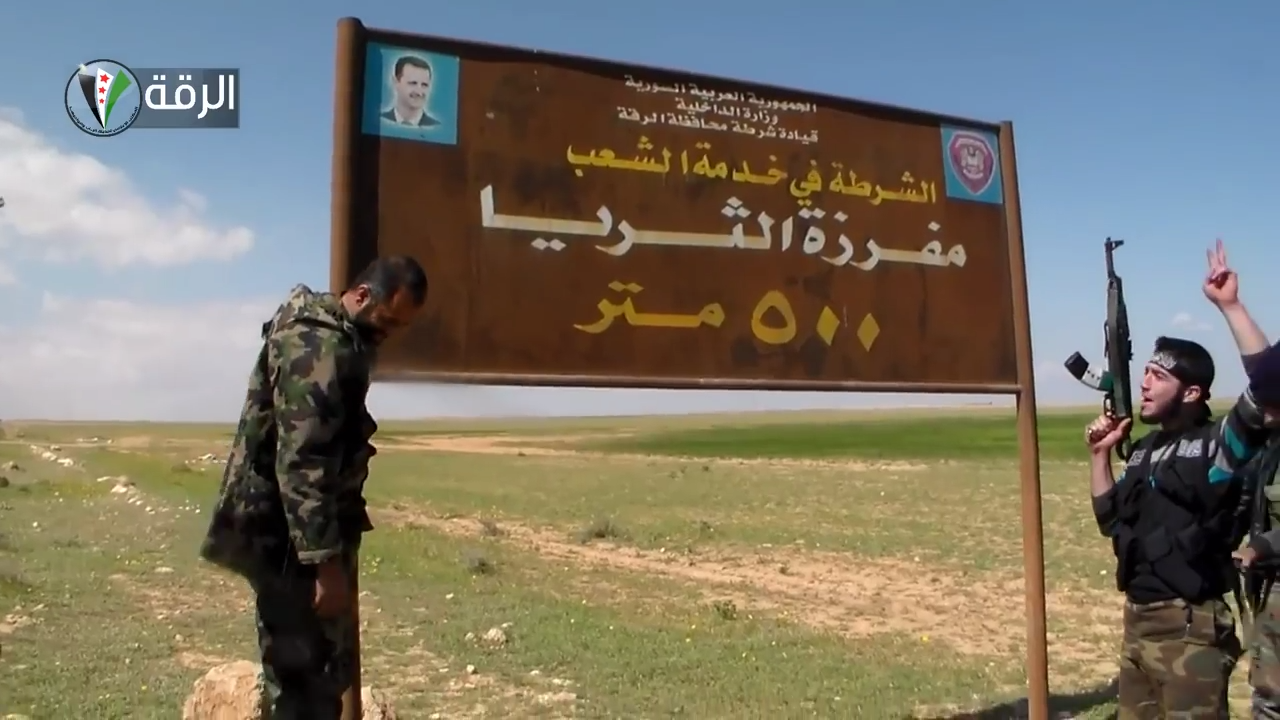
Fighters of al-Tawhid Brigade deface an image of President Bashar al-Assad on the road between Hama and Raqqa on 27 March 2013.

(Syrian opposition) Free Syrian Army-affiliated groups

- (Syrian opposition) Revolutionary Military Council of Raqqa
  - (Syrian opposition) Ahfad al-Rasul Brigades
    - Muntasir Billah Brigade
  - (Syrian opposition) Raqqa Revolutionaries Brigade
  - (Syrian opposition) Northern Storm Brigade
  - Katina's Anwar al-Haqq
  - Custodian of Ummah Phalange
  - Al-Baraa ibn Malik Phalange
  - Al-Hamzah Phalange
  - Muadh ibn Jabal Phalange
  - Revolution Storm Brigade
  - Al-Quds Phalange
  - Northern Lions Phalange
  - Umar ibn Abd al-Aziz Phalange
  - Al-Baz al-Ashhab Phalange
  - Arab Spring Phalange
  - Prophet Offspring Brigade
  - Lights of Righteousness Phalange
  - Aisha bint Abu Bakr Phalange
  - 101st Phalange
  - Abu Bakr as-Siddiq Phalange
  - Peninsula Free Phalange
  - Euphrates Saraya
  - Jerusalem and the Soldiers of Allah Phalange
  - Special Operations Phalange
  - Jihad for Allah Phalange
  - Ar-Rahman Detonators Phalange
  - Righteousness Phalange
  - Ar-Raqqah Martyrs Phalange
  - Mu’awiyah ibn Abi Sufyan Phalange
  - Euphrates Free Phalange
  - Saladin Phalanges
  - Resafa Brigade
- (Syrian opposition) Farouq Brigades
- (Syrian opposition) Conquest Brigade
  - Ghuraba al-Sham Battalion
- Liwa Owais al-Qorani
- Euphrates Knights Brigade
- Free Tabqa Brigade

Independent Islamist groups

- Syrian Islamic Front
  - Ahrar al-Sham
    - Liwa Umana al-Raqqa
- Ghuraba al-Sham
- Islamic Unity and Liberation Front (alliance of several Islamist militias)
- Nasr Saladin Brigade
- Liwa Hudhayfah ibn al-Yaman
- Katibat Hudheifa bin al-Yaman
- Katibat Mohammed bin Abdullah
- Katibat Musaib bin Umair
- Katibat Abu Dujana
- Katibat Saraya al-Furat
- Katibat Shuhada al-Jamaa Jund al-Rahman
- Katibat Ahrar al-Badiyah
- Al-Fajr Islamic Movement
  - Katibat al-Bara'
  - Katibat Saraya al-Furat

Al-Qaeda affiliates and other Salafi jihadists

- Shura Council Front
  - Al-Nusra Front
- Muhajireen Battalion
- Liwa al-Haqq (Idlib)
- Katibat Usud al-Sunna (part of Mujahideen Shura Council)

=== Government forces ===
Syrian Armed Forces

- Syrian Army
  - 17th Division
- Syrian Air Force
- National Defence Forces
- Military Intelligence Directorate
- Political Security Directorate

== See also ==
- Battle of Tell Abyad (2013)
- 2015 Idlib offensive
- Raqqa campaign (2016–2017)

== Bibliography ==
- Winter, Lucas (2014). Raqqa: From Regime overthrow to inter-rebel fighting. Foreign Military Studies Office.
- Lister, Charles R. (2015). The Syrian Jihad: Al-Qaeda, the Islamic State and the Evolution of an Insurgency. Oxford: Oxford University Press. ISBN 978-0-19-061318-1.
