= Manbij Revolutionaries Battalion =

- كتائب ثوار منبج (Arabic); Suwar el-Minbic (Kurdish); Menbic Devrimci Taburları (Turkish)
- Leaders: Mustafa Manbij; Ahmad Arsh; Ali Salah al-Din Bish Alo ("Botan Turkmani") †
- Dates active: 25 January 2016 — Unknown
- Headquarters: Manbij, Aleppo Governorate (until 2024)
- Ideology: Democracy
- Size: Hundreds (acc. to Hawar News Agency)
- Part of: Syrian Democratic Forces; Manbij Military Council
- Wars: the Syrian Civil War

The Manbij Revolutionaries Battalion (Arabic: كتائب ثوار منبج, Kurdish: Suwar el-Minbic, Turkish: Menbic Devrimci Taburları), also simply known as Manbij Revolutionaries (Arabic: ثوار منبج), is a Syrian militia that is part of the Syrian Democratic Forces' Manbij Military Council and operates in the Aleppo Governorate. Members of the unit have declared that their primary goal is to drive the Islamic State of Iraq and the Levant (ISIL) from Syria, and to establish a democratic, inclusionist government in the country.

== History ==
According to the pro-SDF Hawar News Agency, the Manbij Revolutionaries Battalion was founded under the leadership of Mustafa Manbij on 25 January 2016, whereas the Firat News Agency claimed that the militia was formed in April 2016. (Note: An FSA militia of the same name is known to have operated in the Manbij countryside from at least 2012 to 2014, but it is unknown wthether this group is related to the SDF unit. There also exists a unit named "Manbij Revolutionaries Battalion" which is part of the anti-SDF Turkish-backed Free Syrian Army's Sham Legion.) The group was one of the Syrian Democratic Forces' Manbij Military Council's founding members.

The Manbij Revolutionaries Battalion participated in the Manbij offensive from May 2016, and helped to encircle Manbij city. The militia's fighters encountered ISIL forces armed with HEAT missiles during the fighting around the town. One of the group's chief commanders, Ali Salah al-Din Bish Alo (alias "Botan Turkmani"), was killed during the Manbij campaign. Ali had been a veteran of the Kurdish Front and also served as commander for the al-Bab Military Council while leading the Manbij Revolutionaries Battalion. The SDF later named a military academy after him. After Turkey and allied FSA groups launched Operation Euphrates Shield against ISIL and the YPG/YPJ, a Manbij Revolutionaries Battalion commander expressed a strong disapproval of the Turkish occupation of northern Syria. He claimed that Turkey was prolonging the Syrian Civil War by intervening, and that it wanted to prevent the formation of a democratic government in northern Syria.

On 4 February 2017, 100 fighters completed their training at the Martyr Faysal Abu Layla Academy at Manbij, joining the Manbij Revolutionaries Battalion, and by extension, the Manbij Military Council. On 21 February, unidentified gunmen killed five commanders of the unit in the village of Al-Awsajly, west of Manbij.

In early March, as fighting between the Syrian Democratic Forces and the Turkish-backed forces escalated in the western Manbij countryside, the SDF made a deal with the Assad government. Accordingly, the SDF handed over a number of villages in the area to the Syrian Army, so that the Turkish forces could no longer attack them. On 6 March 2016, Manbij Revolutionaries Battalion commander Ahmad Arsh appeared in a Russia Today video, dressed like a member of the Syrian Armed Forces and with a Syrian government flag in the background. He claimed to be a commander of the Syrian Border Police, and that he and his men had taken control of the villages in question.

By February 2019, Manbij Revolutionaries Battalion commander Mustafa Manbij led an Arab SDF contingent during the Battle of Baghuz Fawqani, ISIL's last important territorial holding in Syria.

== Organization ==
According to the pro-SDF Hawar News Agency, the Manbij Revolutionaries Battalion consists of hundreds of fighters, most of them belonging to tribes that live to Manbij city's west and south. The group is multiethnic, and has recruited Arabs, Kurds, and Syrian Turkmen into its ranks.

Fighters of the group have claimed that their ultimate aim is to establish a democratic government in Syria.

== See also ==
- List of armed groups in the Syrian Civil War
