= Liwa Owais al-Qorani =

Syrian Rebel Group

Owais al-Qorani Brigade
- لواء أويس القرني; Liwa Owais al-Qorani
- Logo of the group
- Leader: Abdel Fattah al-Sheikh Mooss ("Abdul Fatah Abu Muhammad")
- Dates active: June 2012 – 2014; 2016 – unknown (remnants)
- Group: Saraya al-Furat-Katibat al-Shura
- Headquarters: Al-Thawrah (2013–14)
- Active regions: Raqqa Governorate
- Ideology: Islamism; Uwais al-Qarani reverence Nasser tribalism
- Size: 1,000 (2013 claim)
- Part of: (Syrian opposition) Free Syrian Army (c. 2013); Syrian Democratic Forces (since 2016)
- Wars: Syrian Civil War

The Owais al-Qorani Brigade (Arabic: لواء أويس القرني; Liwa Owais al-Qorani) is a Syrian rebel group from al-Thawrah that was formed in 2012 and revered the Islamic martyr Uwais al-Qarani. Originally part of the Free Syrian Army, the brigade later became a subordinate of the Islamic State of Iraq and the Levant, only to be destroyed by ISIL in 2014 over disagreements. Remnants of the group eventually joined the Syrian Democratic Forces to take revenge on ISIL.

== History ==
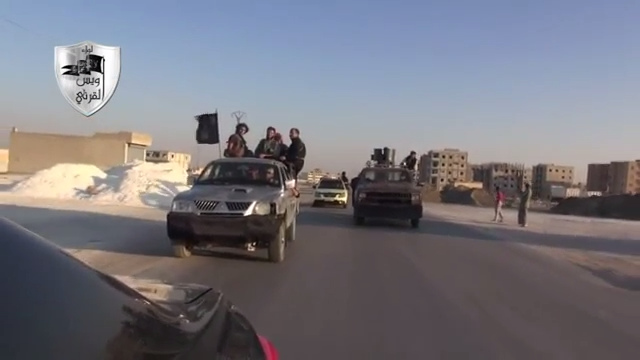
A convoy of vehicles of Liwa Owais al-Qorani leaving Tabqa and heading to Ayn Issa in June 2013.

The group was originally formed as "Katibat Owais al-Qorani" (Owais al-Qorani Battalion) by followers of Owais al-Qorani and members of the local Nasser tribe in June 2012 as part of the Free Syrian Army. Over time, the group came to function as private army of the Nasser tribe, who considered itself the "bedrock of the revolution in the region". Katibat Owais al-Qorani was one of the earliest rebel groups to become active in the area around al-Thawrah and among the first to carry out urban insurgency attacks against government forces inside the town. In September 2012, it reportedly ambushed Military Intelligence members in al-Thawrah. The group eventually joined a Free Syrian Army coalition.

In February 2013, Katibat Owais al-Qorani was part of the rebel alliance that attacked and captured al-Thawrah from the government, and thereafter helped laying siege to the nearby airport which was still held by the Syrian Army. On 14 April 2013, Katibat Owais al-Qorani was reorganized into Liwa Owais al-Qorani. By this time, the group no longer used the Syrian independence flag, instead using the Black Standard variant with the "Seal of Muhammad". Later that year in November, the group was among the rebel units that captured Dibsi Afnan in Al-Thawrah District. Liwa Owais al-Qorani also managed to capture around 110 government fighters. These prisoners were held "in decent conditions", as the militia hoped to be able to trade them for its own members who were imprisoned. By October 2013, however, half of these POWs had managed to escape.

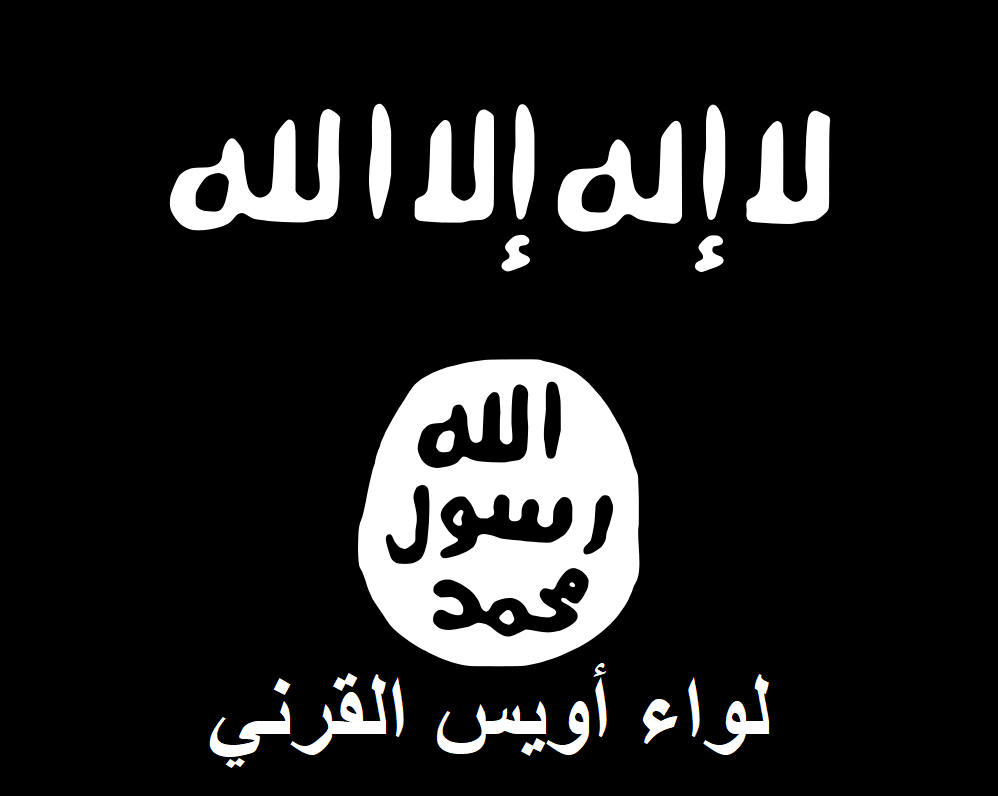
The unit used the same Black Standard as ISIL, with the addition of its name on the flag.

By late 2013 and early 2014, as the Islamic State of Iraq and the Levant rose in power in Raqqa Governorate and began to eliminate other local rebel groups, Liwa Owais al-Qorani refused to take up arms against ISIL, reasoning that "all Islamic factions are brothers in religion". Though it did not swear loyalty to the Islamic State and continued to affirm its independence, this behavior resulted in Liwa Owais al-Qorani effectively becoming an ISIL subordinate. In March 2014, however, the rest of Liwa Owais al-Qorani's prisoners managed to break out of their prison. This led to severe tensions between the brigade and ISIL, and the latter eventually decided to forcibly disband Liwa Owais al-Qorani. The group's members were imprisoned or executed, while Owais al-Qorani's shrine in Raqqa was destroyed by the Islamic State. Some months later, several members of Liwa Owais al-Qorani's jailed leadership managed to escape ISIL custody and fled to Turkey; two years later, in late 2016, these survivors returned to Syria, joining the Syrian Democratic Forces to help them push ISIL out of al-Thawrah.

Around 60 former fighters of Liwa Owais al-Qorani who joined al-Qaeda's al-Nusra Front fled to Germany in late 2014. In September 2017, the federal prosecutor of Germany accused them 25 of them of being members of a terrorist organization and committing war crimes after a mass grave of 36 policemen, administrative assistants, and government militia commanders who were massacred by Liwa Owais al-Qorani was uncovered in Tabqa.

== Bibliography ==
- Winter, Lucas (2014). Raqqa: From Regime overthrow to inter-rebel fighting. Foreign Military Studies Office.
- Kodmani, Bassma; Legrand, Félix (2013). "Raqqa: From Regime overthrow to inter-rebel fighting". Arab Reform Initiative. Beirut, Paris.
