= Euphrates Volcano =

2014–15 Syrian Civil War rebel operation

- بركان الفرات (Arabic)
- The emblem is a shield with the flags of the FSA and YPG on either side of the Euphrates river, with a volcano surrounded by a sun in the background
- Dates active: 10 September 2014 – 10 October 2015
- Group: People's Protection Units; Women's Protection Units; Liwa Thuwar al-Raqqa; Euphrates Jarabulus Battalions; Jarabulus Company; Retribution Army; Jaysh al-Salam; Liwa Ahrar al-Raqqa; Liberation Brigade; Army of Revolutionaries; Kurdish Front; Northern Sun Battalion; Seljuk Brigade
- Active regions: Aleppo Governorate and Raqqa Governorate
- Wars: Syrian Civil War

Euphrates Volcano (Arabic: بُرْكَان الْفُرَات, romanized: Burkān al-Furāt) was a joint operations room/coalition established during the Syrian Civil War. It mainly consisted of the Syrian Kurdish People's Protection Units (YPG) and certain factions of the Free Syrian Army (FSA). The group fought to expel the Islamic State from Aleppo and Raqqa provinces. In an October 2015 publication, the Washington D.C.-based Institute for the Study of War considered Euphrates Volcano as one of the "powerbrokers" in Aleppo Province, being primarily "anti-ISIS" but not necessarily "anti-regime".

== History ==
In September 2014, several Free Syrian Army groups released a video addressing the Siege of Kobani in which they issued a joint statement pledging to defend the city from ISIS and asking for aid from western countries to do so. The Wall Street Journal noted that the flag of the YPG featured prominently in the video, indicating the possibility of YPG cooperation with the FSA.

This was proved true later that year, when YPG members started to train FSA members, eventually leading to the establishment of the Euphrates Volcano, which deepened the alliance between the PYD and Kobani FSA.

The capture of Tell Abyad from ISIS in July 2015 was a major success of the Euphrates Volcano operations room.

On 10 October 2015, the Euphrates Volcano was one of the founding members of the Syrian Democratic Forces. Soon after the formation of the SDF, the Euphrates Volcano was superseded by various other groups and military councils within the SDF. It was one of the few operations rooms which had been set up by non-government forces during the civil war that were able to transform into a "semi-stable" alliance.

== See also ==
- Euphrates Islamic Liberation Front
- List of armed groups in the Syrian Civil War
