= Tell Abyad offensive =

May 2015 military operation of the Syrian Civil War

Coordinates: 36.6973°N 38.9551°E

- Part of the Syrian Civil War, Syrian Kurdish–Islamist conflict, and the American-led intervention in Syria
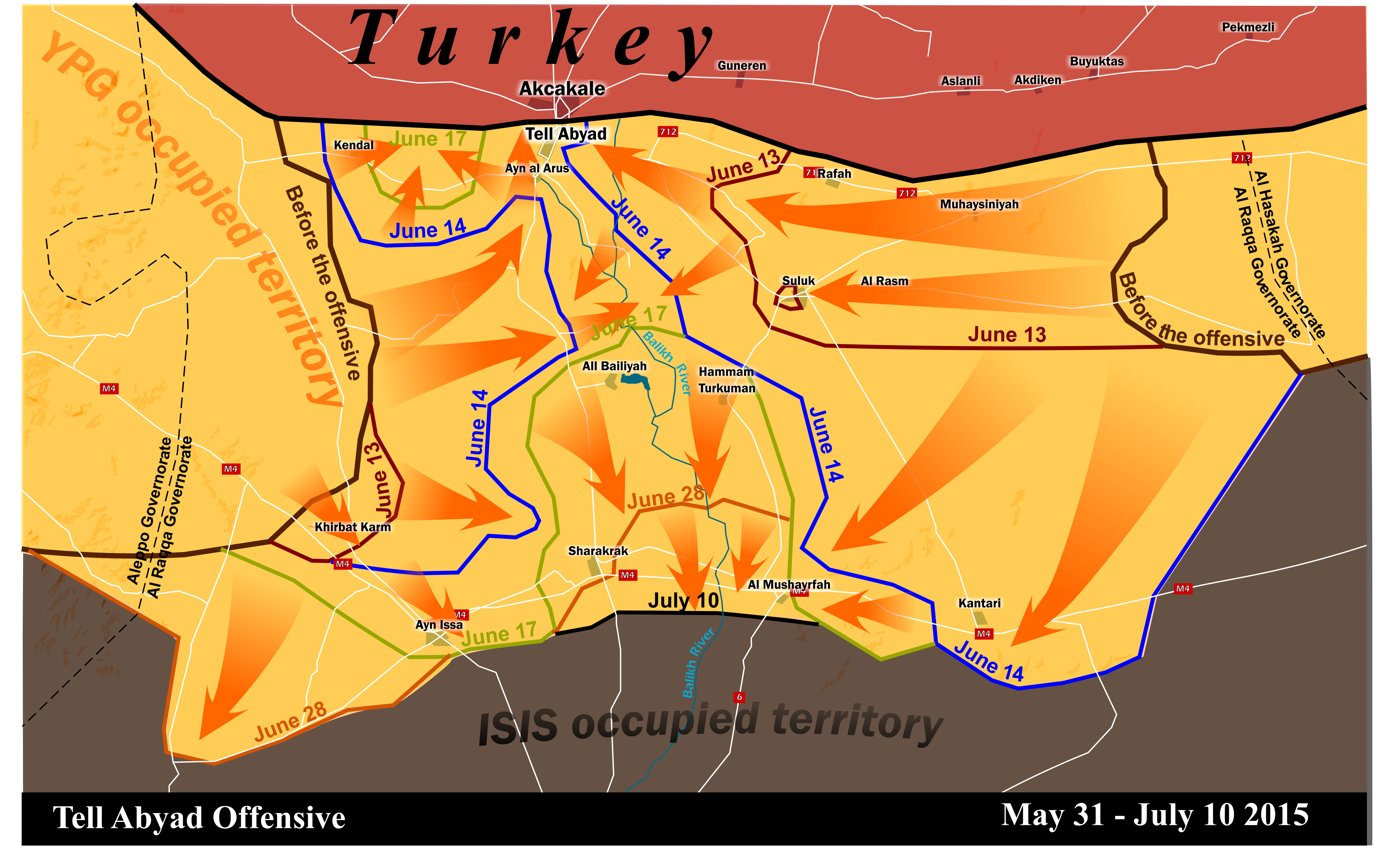
- Map of the Tell Abyad offensive
Date	31 May – 10 July 2015 (1 month, 1 week and 3 days)
Location	Northern Raqqa Governorate, Syria
Result	Major YPG-led victory
Territorial changes	The YPG captures Tell Abyad, Suluk, Ayn Issa, 32+ villages, the Brigade 93 base and part of the M4 Highway in northern Raqqa; The YPG & FSA geographically connects the Kobani Canton with the Jazira Canton.

Belligerents
Rojava: YPG; Free Syrian Army; Supported by: CJTF–OIR	Islamic State

Commanders and leaders
Sipan Hamo (YPG general commander); Binhari Kendal (Top commander of Tell Abyad operations); Rojda Felat (YPJ commander); Abu al-Qasim (Liwa Thuwwar al-Raqqa commander); Abu Layla (Northern Sun Battalion commander); Adnan Abu Amjad (Northern Sun Battalion deputy commander); Abu Mohammed (FSA commander); Abu Ali (Note: The Retribution Army under Abu Ali took part in the offensive until a dispute with the YPG on 16 June. On the following day, the group left the Euphrates Volcano operations room and went to Turkey.) (Retribution Army commander); Lt. Gen. James L. Terry (CJTF–OIR commander)	Abu Ali al-Anbari (Deputy, Syria); Abu Musab (ISIL emir of Tell Abyad); Abdel-Majed Abdel Bary; Unknown Dokumacılar commander †

Units involved
Euphrates Volcano; YPG; YPJ; Liwa Thuwar al-Raqqa; Army of Revolutionaries; Northern Sun Battalion; (Syrian opposition) Jaysh al-Salam; Liberation Brigade; Retribution Army	(Islamic State) Military of ISIL: Wilayat Raqqa; Dokumacılar

Strength
YPG & FSA: 4,000+	1,500+

Casualties and losses
46 killed	338–599 killed, 50 missing
- 9 civilians killed 23,000+ civilians displaced (including 13,000 Arabs and Turkmen)

The Tell Abyad offensive or Martyr Rubar Qamışlo operation was a military operation that began in late May 2015 in the northern Raqqa Governorate, during the Syrian Civil War. It was conducted by the Kurdish-majority People's Protection Units (YPG) and the Free Syrian Army (FSA) against the Islamic State of Iraq and the Levant. The offensive took place from the end of May until July 2015. The campaign was the second phase of the Kurdish Operation Commander Rûbar Qamishlo, which began with the Al-Hasakah offensive (May 2015), and involved the merger of the Kobanî offensive with the former. The focus of the campaign was to capture the key border town of Tell Abyad, and to link the Kobanî and Jazira Cantons in Northern Syria.

== Background ==
During May 2015, YPG and allied forces recaptured 4,000 square kilometres (1,500 mi^{2}) of land in the western Al-Hasakah Governorate in a large-scale offensive, expelling ISIL forces from the region. YPG and allied forces captured Mabrukah, the Tell Tamer countryside, and wide parts of Ras al-Ayn countryside.

== The offensive ==
=== Advance to Suluk ===
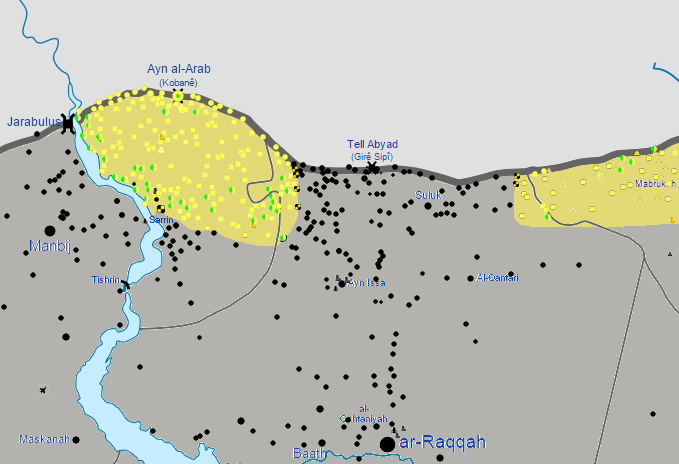
The situation in the Tell Abyad region on 31 May 2015, at the start of the offensive.

On 31 May, Kurdish forces seized four villages on the provincial boundary between Al-Hasakah and Raqqa. At the same time, Kurdish and FSA forces in the eastern Kobanî Canton launched a large offensive eastward towards Tell Abyad, with the YPG and FSA forces on both frontlines numbering at least 4,000. Over 35 ISIL militants were reportedly killed in the Kurdish-led offensive on 1 June. On 2 June, ISIL was reported to have dispatched 1,500 fighters to the Tell Abyad region as reinforcements, mostly to the west of Tell Abyad, to halt the Kurdish advance. ISIL was also reported to be reinforcing the approaches to Tell Abyad, including mining the roads and houses to Tell Abyad with explosives, especially in the western approaches from Kobanî.

By 2 June, YPG and FSA forces on the eastern boundary of the Kobanî Canton had launched an offensive towards Tell Abyad, advancing to Saada, about halfway between the Canton boundary and Tell Abyad by 4 June. Around the same time, YPG and FSA forces from the Jazira Canton had advanced to the villages neighboring the town of Suluk. However, ISIL reinforcements stalled the advance from the Kobanî front.

On 7 June, the YPG, backed by the FSA, launched an attack to the east of Suluk, and captured a number of villages to the southwest of Ras al-Ayn, west of the eastern provincial boundary of the Raqqa Governorate.

Between 8 and 9 June, YPG and allied forces captured two villages to the east of the town of Suluk. The fighting left 21 ISIL militants, including commanders, dead.

On 10 June, YPG and allied forces captured a hill and five villages east of Suluk, while a number of displaced people from the town reached Raqqa city.

Between 11 and 12 June, YPG and allied forces captured the eastern part of Suluk, and some villages near it, but were forced to retreat from Salouk due to planted mines the next day.

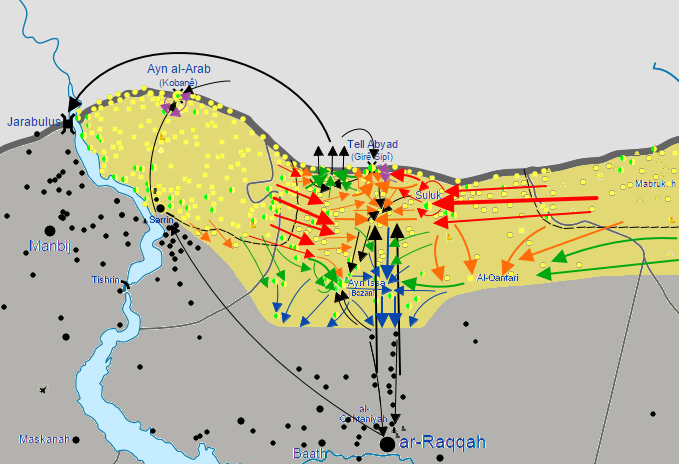
Map of the offensive

By 13 June, the YPG, backed by the FSA, were within 10 km from Tell Abyad, while the YPG and the rebels besieged Suluk and their units advanced in the eastern countryside of Kobani. That day, thousands of Syrians from the region sought refugee in Turkey, but were pushed back by Turkish forces. Meanwhile, ISIL blew up the main bridge east of Tell Abyad, in an attempt to stall the YPG/rebel advance. At least 16 ISIL militants were killed during the day.

By 14 June, YPG and allied forces were within 5 km from Tell Abyad, capturing about 20 villages to the southeast of the town, after ISIL withdrew most of its forces from the region. Meanwhile, 150 ISIL militants threatened to leave Tell Abyad, due to the lack of support from the ISIL high command. YPG and allied forces also captured Salouk, after ISIL escaped from the besieged town. The siege lasted for 48 hours. Later that day, a Kurdish activist claimed that Turkey abandoned the border gate, which allowed ISIL fighters to enter Turkey and escape the conflict zone, while Elijah J. Magnier reported that Turkey temporally opened its border for about 2,000 Syrian refugees. According to a Raqqa-based activist, ISIL stripped the Tell Abyad hospital of all of its equipment and moved it to Raqqa. YPG and allied forces advanced to the southeast and southwest of Tell Abyad, capturing a number of villages, while ISIL blew up two bridges.

=== Linking of Cantons, capture of Tell Abyad ===
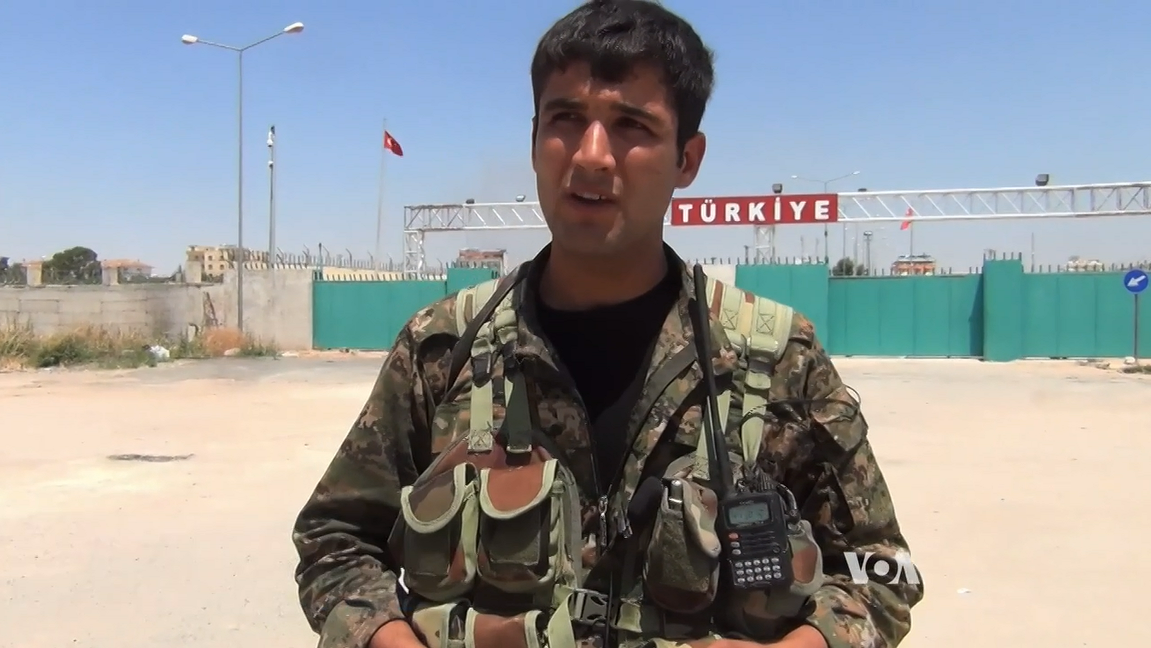
A YPG fighter at the Tell Abyad border gate with Turkey after the town's capture

During the night of 14 June, an ISIL suicide bomber detonated himself near a YPG checkpoint in the southwestern countryside of Tell Abyad, killing four YPG fighters and two medical crew members. Meanwhile, YPG and allied forces reportedly entered the town from the west and east. Coalition warplanes reportedly bombed an ISIL HQ inside the town shortly after that. It was reported that around 600 ISIL militants were trapped in Tell Abyad by the advancing YPG and FSA forces, whom were threatening to desert their positions if they did not receive more reinforcements.

On 15 June, YPG and allied forces captured Mashor Tahtani, to the southeast of Tell Abyad, and seized the Tell Abyad-Raqqa road, besieging the strategic border town of Tell Abyad, and connecting the two Kurdish cantons of Kobanî and Jazira. The Kurdish forces coming in from both the west and east linked up at the village of Qaysariyeh, two miles south of Tell Abyad. Later that day, Kurdish and rebel forces seized the Tell Abyad border crossing and the eastern and southern part of the town. Eleven ISIL militants reportedly surrendered themselves to the Turkish Army, on the other side of the Syrian–Turkish border. Some time later, allied forces captured most of Tell Abyad, while a few pockets of ISIL resistance remained inside the town. Around 40 ISIL militants were killed while attempting to flee the town towards Ayn Issa. Others successfully fled the town.

The next day, YPG and allied forces captured Tell Abyad, and reinforced positions around the town and border crossing, while ISIL reinforced their own positions to the north of Raqqa city. At the same time, the YPG was reported to be bringing reinforcements from the Al-Hasakah Governorate, to prevent ISIL from reopening the supply routes to Tell Abyad. Following Tell Abyad's capture, disputes arose between the YPG and the Free Syrian Army's Retribution Army, as result of which the latter left the offensive and went to Turkey.

=== Capturing the Brigade 93 base, Ayn Issa, and part of the M4 Highway ===
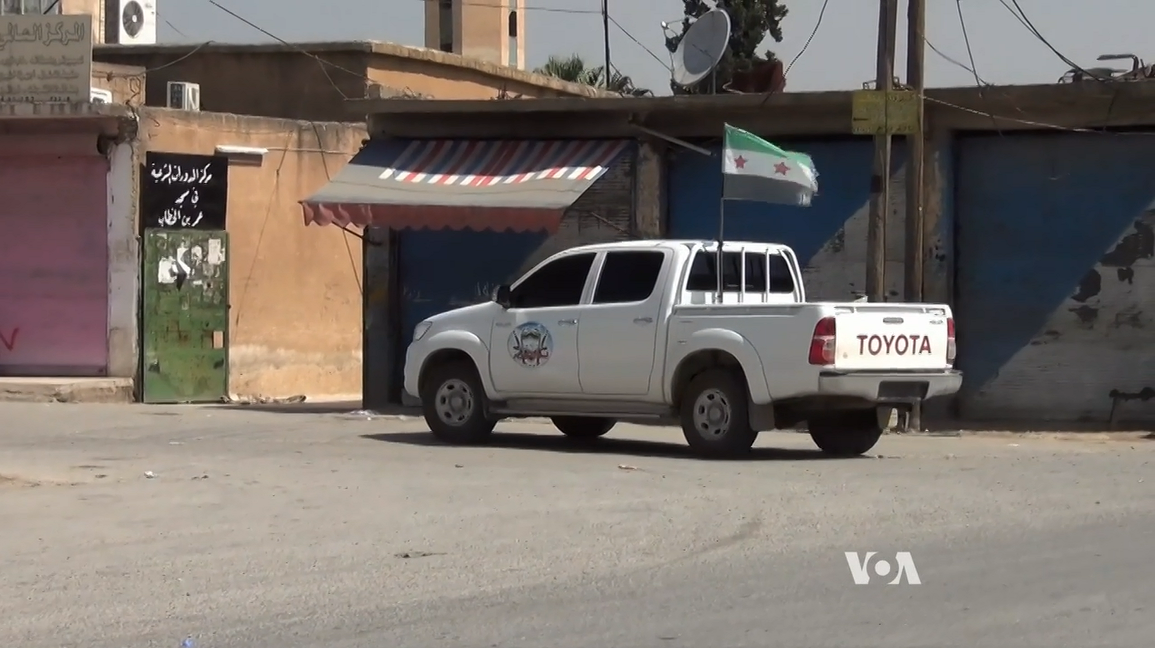
A Liberation Brigade Toyota truck during the offensive

On 15 June, YPG and rebels captured the village of Shunaynah to the south of Tell Abyad, reducing ISIL control in the region to a besieged pocket just west of Tell Abyad, and a stretch of land between Ayn Issa and Al-Qartari, to the south of Tell Abyad. YPG and FSA forces also entered Ayn Issa on the same day, and despite subsequent reports that they had captured the town, it was eventually revealed that ISIL fighters were still present, and fighting for control of the town.

On 17 June, the first refugees returned to Tell Abyad, after they fled to Turkey. That day, hundreds of YPG fighters reached YPG positions in Aleppo Governorate, while a large fire broke out in the countryside to the south of Kobanî. Later on 17 June, the pocket of ISIL resistance to the west of Tell Abyad collapsed under pressure from YPG and FSA forces, with numerous ISIL commanders bribing their way into Turkey after the ISIL defenses failed. ISIL also began sending reinforcements to its remaining area of control to the south of Tell Abyad. It was also revealed that ISIL forces were still fighting with FSA and YPG fighters for control of Ayn Issa, although YPG and FSA forces had captured some villages just west of Ayn Issa. In July 2015, it was reported that Bary was on the run in Turkey, after having left ISIL. He disguised himself as a refugee and escaped during the ISIL retreat from Tal Abyad in June 2015. He is now being sought by both the British security services and by ISIL executioners, who have recently killed scores of foreign fighters for deserting their ranks, according to British security sources.

On 19 June, the YPG, backed by FSA rebels, advanced in the southern countryside of Tell Abyad, capturing a village, and reaching the village of Ali Bajliyya two days later. On the same day, ISIL launched a counterattack from the east of Ayn Issa, recapturing the town, but was unable to push beyond the M4 Highway. It was also revealed that despite the ISIL reinforcements, ISIL had an insufficient number of fighters to hold their positions. The remaining ISIL fighters were reportedly fortifying their positions along the riverbanks of the river near Tell Abyad, as well as the highway connecting Raqqa to Tell Abyad, while maintaining small units to the east of the water course. It was also reported that the ISIL fighters who had escaped into Turkey, from the villages to the west of Tell Abyad, were seeking transportation westward to re-enter Syria in the northern Aleppo Governorate.

On 22 June, Kurdish-led forces captured the Brigade 93 military base from ISIL, just southwest of Ayn Issa, and pushed within seven kilometers of the town itself. ISIL fighters in the area retreated to the east and towards Ayn Issa. On the same day, it was reported that civilians in the town of Ayn Issa were evacuating, in anticipation of the impending clash between the YPG & FSA and ISIL forces. It was also reported that 2,000 civilians who fled Tell Abyad to Turkey had returned. The next day, Kurdish forces entered the outskirts of Ayn Issa, and besieged the town. On 23 June, the YPG and FSA captured Ayn Issa except for the grain silos, after ISIL fighters retreated from the town. However, hours later, two groups of ISIL fighters managed to re-enter Ayn Issa. At the same time, a large migration of civilians from Raqqa city towards al-Tabaqa was reported. At the end of the day, Kurdish forces and FSA fighters were in complete control of Ayn Issa and the surrounding region, bringing them within 50 km (30 miles) of Raqqa city. On the same day, YPG and FSA forces advanced to the south of Tell Abyad, capturing multiple villages. YPG forces also captured the village of Abu Naytulah, to the northwest of Ayn Issa.

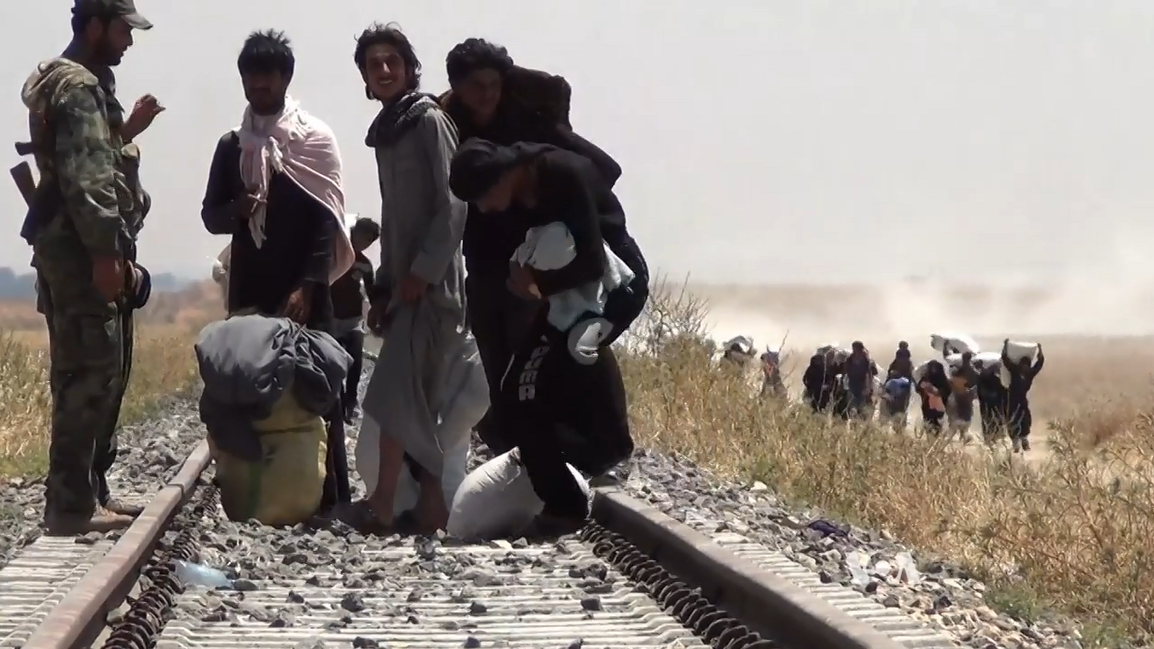
Some refugees returning to the Tell Abyad region on 24 June.

On 24 June, YPG-led forces captured the village Shakrak, located just east of Ayn Issa. They also captured the village of Khirbat Hadla, to the southwest of Ayn Issa, bringing them within 35 kilometres (21.75 mi) of Raqqa. By 25 June, YPG-led forces also secured the remaining part of the M4 Highway in the northern Raqqa Province, fully linking the frontlines, and consolidating their control of the roads leading to Raqqa.

The capture of Ayn Issa and the M4 Highway in the northern Raqqa Province blocked the ISIL supply line between the Aleppo and Al-Hasakah Provinces.

=== ISIL counterattack and offensive ends ===
On 25 June, ISIL militants launched an attack on the city of Kobanî, in retaliation for the recent Kurdish advances in the Al-Hasakah and Tell Abyad regions.

On 28 June, more than six ISIL militants were killed, and over 17 were wounded in the southern countryside of Tell Abyad. On the same day, it was reported that ISIL militants on the Turkish side of the Syrian-Turkish border were preparing for an assault near Tell Abyad.

On 30 June, ISIL raided Tell Abyad, with the help of sleeper cells, seizing a district on the eastern outskirts of the town. The YPG quickly responded and made an attempt to encircle the militants. The next day, the YPG fully regained control of Tell Abyad, killing three ISIL militants, while another had blown himself up with an explosive belt. Two others were injured, but were reported to have escaped into Turkey. On 3 July, ISIL infiltrators attacked the village of Qinetra, near Tell Abyad along the Syrian-Turkish border, with a vehicle bomb and 4 suicide bombers. The attack was repelled but left 2 FSA fighters and 6 ISIL militants dead.

On 6 July, ISIL recaptured Ayn Issa, following a massive counterattack that left dozens of YPG fighters dead or wounded, including an attack at Sharakrak. On the next day, YPG-led forces recaptured 11 villages near Ayn Issa that they had lost the previous day, including Sharakrak, but Ayn Issa itself was still ISIL-held, and fighting continued around the town. On 8 July, the YPG recaptured Ayn Issa. At least 69 ISIL militants and 5 YPG fighters were reportedly killed in the clashes, with an additional 78 ISIL militants killed by Coalition airstrikes. On 9 July, ISIL launched another counterattack at Ayn Issa, but this assault was repelled by 10 July. Later on the same day, the YPG declared their offensive successfully over.

== Aftermath ==
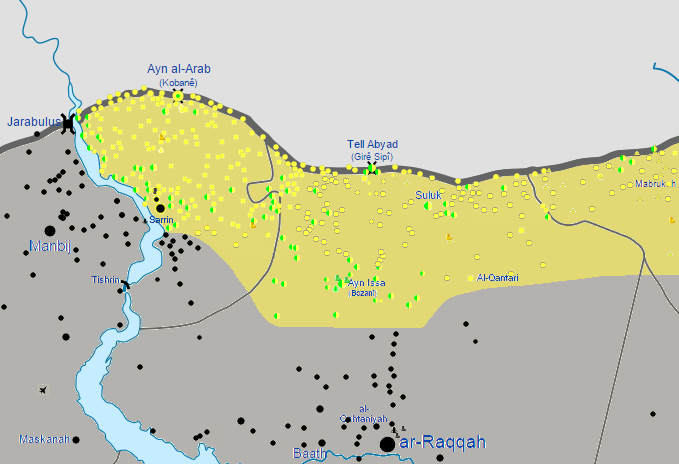
The situation in the Tell Abyad region on 10 July 2015, after the conclusion of the offensive.

From 14 to 18 July, ISIL militants launched a series of suicide attacks on areas near Tell Abyad and Suluk. The clashes killed at least 1 YPG fighter and 16 ISIL militants.

On 23 July, ISIL fighters infiltrated into the Suluk countryside and attacked the village of Tell Himan; however, the YPG repelled the attack and swept the area for ISIL fighters after the clashes.

On 25 July 20 ISIL suicide bombers attacked the Tell Abyad countryside. All of the ISIL attackers were killed in the ensuing clashes.

On 28 September, SOHR reported that a Syrian oppositionist and former political prisoner from Raqqa city, who criticized the YPG, has told them that an ISIL member had been tortured to death by the Kurdish internal security forces, inside a prison. Kurdish forces denied the claims and that said the militant was injured, and that the man died while he was being transferred to a hospital.

On 27 February 2016, ISIL launched an attack on Tell Abyad from both Turkey to the north and Syria further south. However, Turkey denied the attackers came from Turkish soil. The attack killed 20 YPG militants at the cost of more than 45 ISIL fighters, according to SOHR, before being repelled by the Kurdish forces, with air support from the US-led coalition.

== Strategic analysis ==
Tell Abyad has been described by the Washington Post as "one of the Islamic State's most strategically vital possessions", because of its border crossing with Turkey. Its fall would isolate the Islamic State's self-proclaimed capital in the city of Raqqa. Seizing Tell Abyad would also help the YPG to link up the Kurdish-controlled areas of northern Syria. It has been argued that the successful battle, mixing coalition air power and militia fighters could be a "blueprint for success," but is difficult to repeat in other areas.

== Reactions ==
=== International reaction ===
- United States – The U.S. expressed their concern, through State Department spokesman Jeff Rathke, about the human rights records of Syrian Kurdish fighters during the offensive, which displaced thousands of Arabs and Turkmen.
- Turkey – Turkish President Tayyip Erdoğan said that the potential takeover of Tell Abyad poses a "direct threat" to Turkey and voiced worries about the displacement of Turkmens and Arabs. He accused the Kurds of occupying Arab regions as they were pushing deeper into ISIL territory.
