= Euphrates Islamic Liberation Front =

- جبهة تحرير الفرات الإسلامية; Jabhat al-Tahrir al-Furat al-Islamiyyah
- Leader: Abdullah Abu Raed
- Dates active: February 2014 – ? (defunct since late 2014)
- Active regions: Raqqa Governorate, Deir ez-Zor Governorate, and Aleppo Governorate, Syria
- Ideology: Islamism
- Wars: Syrian Civil War

The Euphrates Islamic Liberation Front (Arabic: جبهة تحرير الفرات الإسلامية; Jabhat al-Tahrir al-Furat al-Islamiyyah) was a Syrian rebel alliance that was active during the Syrian civil war. The group became defunct in late 2014.

== Affiliated groups ==
- Ahfad al-Rasul Brigades
- Jihad in the Path of God Brigade
- Martyr Abu Furat Battalions
- Ansar and Dawah Martyrs Brigades
- Manbij Martyrs Brigades
- Descendants of the Companions Brigade
- Light of God Islamic Jihad Battalion
- Abu Dhar al-Ghifari Battalion
- Liwa al-Fatah al-Mubin
- Righteous Banner Brigades
- Sword of Islam Battalion
- Dawn of Islam Battalion
- Raqqa Martyrs Battalion
- Free Raqqa Battalion
- 212 Air Defence Battalion

== See also ==
- List of armed groups in the Syrian Civil War
