= Liwa Thuwar al-Raqqa =

Rebel group in the Syrian Civil War

Raqqa Revolutionaries Brigade Liwa Thūwwār ar-Raqqah
- لواء ثوار الرقة
- Logo of Liwa Thuwar al-Raqqa Flag of Liwa Thuwar al-Raqqa
- Leaders: Ahmad al-Othman bin Alloush ("Abu Issa al-Raqqawi"); Abu Saif; Abu Dahash; Capt. Abu Jasim al-Shammari; Abdullah al-Helu; Abu Diab †
- Dates active: September 2012 – June 2018
- Groups: Free Women of Raqqa Battalion; Former: Raqqa Hawks Brigade; Raqqa Martyrs Brigade; Jihad in the Path of God Brigade; Victory of Saladin Battalion; Ahrar al-Furat; Saraya al-Furat
- Headquarters: Ayn Issa
- Active regions: Raqqa Governorate and Aleppo Governorate,
- Ideology: Sunni Islamism (2012–14); Democracy (since 2014)
- Size: +800 (self-claim, late 2015)
- Part of: Free Syrian Army; Syrian Democratic Forces (2015–present); Al-Nusra Front (September 2013–January 2014); Euphrates Volcano (2014–2015)
- Wars: the Syrian Civil War

Liwa Thuwar al-Raqqa (Arabic: لواء ثوار الرقة, romanized: Liwā' Thūwwār ar-Raqqah, lit. 'Raqqa Revolutionaries' Brigade') was a rebel group in the Syrian Civil War. It was formed in September 2012 in the Raqqa Governorate. Aligned with jihadist factions for its first years, at the end of 2015, it joined the Syrian Democratic Forces. During an interview by Aymenn Jawad Al-Tamimi in 2015, Liwa Thuwar al-Raqqa's media director stated that the group wants a "civil democratic state". He also claimed that the group had no relations with the Syrian National Coalition based in Turkey.

Between the end of 2015 and mid-2017, the group was known as Jabhat Thuwar al-Raqqa (Arabic: جبهة ثوار الرقة, romanized: Jabhat Thūwwār ar-Raqqah), or the Front of Raqqa Revolutionaries.

== History ==
=== Liwa Thuwar al-Raqqa ===
Liwa Thuwar al-Raqqa's founder and commander is Ahmad al-Othman bin Alloush, a member of an Arab tribe in the Raqqa region, commonly known by his nom de guerre Abu Issa al-Raqqawi. With the start of the Syrian Civil War, Abu Issa participated in protests against the Syrian government in Raqqa city, and was arrested twice. In 2012, he established an armed group in the Raqqa area. On 19 September, rebel groups captured the border town of Tell Abyad. Abu Issa's group soon merged with 6 others in the area to form Liwa Thuwar al-Raqqa, initially based in Tell Abyad and part of the Revolutionary Military Council in Raqqa Governorate.

In December 2012, 3 rebel groups in and around Raqqa joined Liwa Thuwar al-Raqqa. In the same month, Liwa Thuwar al-Raqqa joined a coalition called the Raqqa Liberation Front, along with other groups including the Ahfad al-Rasul Brigade. Alongside al-Nusra Front and Ahrar al-Sham, these groups captured Raqqa city after a 3-day battle in early March 2013. After the battle, these groups laid siege on the 17th Division, 93rd Brigade, and Tabqa Air Base around Raqqa.

Since April 2013, Liwa Thuwar al-Raqqa cooperated with al-Nusra Front, Ahrar al-Sham, the Islamic State of Iraq and the Levant (ISIL), and other rebel groups in the area. By July 2013, the group added the word "Islamic" to its name, and appeared in a joint statement with ISIL in front of the latter's Black Standard. Despite publicly cooperating, however, tensions began to rise between Liwa Thuwar al-Raqqa, ISIL, and Ahrar al-Sham. In September 2013, Liwa Thuwar al-Raqqa pledged allegiance to the al-Nusra Front, part of al-Qaeda. and became part of it, although it was not fully integrated into al-Nusra. During the time Liwa al-Thuwar al-Raqqa was part of al-Nusra, it fought the Kurdish-led People's Protection Units (YPG) in Tell Abyad, and was accused by Kurdish officials of involvement in the abduction of Kurds and looting in Raqqa city.

In January 2014, Liwa Thuwar al-Raqqa led the fight against the ISIL in the city of Raqqa, and was expelled from al-Nusra Front. After ISIL expelled Liwa Thuwar al-Raqqa and other rebel groups from Raqqa city, Liwa Thuwar al-Raqqa moved into the northern Raqqa Governorate countryside and allied itself with the YPG and the Kurdish Front. In July 2014 the faction and 10 other groups threatened to leave the Aleppo and Raqqa governorates if they were not aided by other rebels in their fight against ISIL.

In September 2014, Liwa Thuwar al-Raqqa joined the YPG-FSA Euphrates Volcano joint operations room. It received anti-tank missiles and other equipment from the United States through the Şanlıurfa border crossing as part of the Syrian Train and Equip Program to fight ISIL.

In mid-2015, it participated in the YPG-led offensive towards the Syrian border city of Tell Abyad. In June, fighters from Liwa Thuwar al-Raqqa were near the Turkish border, whilst the group was also fighting ISIL in the southern city of Ayn Issa, on the Raqqa road. Liwa Thuwar al-Raqqa was able to grow considerably in size because of the influx of both rebels from Turkey and locals who wanted to fight ISIL. The current size of the brigade is unknown, but numbers in the hundreds at least. In October 2015, the group stated it received military equipment from the United States and YPG in order to fight ISIL north of Raqqa. The group also stated its intention to capture the city of Raqqa from ISIL. Analyst Aymenn Jawad Al-Tamimi claimed that Liwa Thuwar al-Raqqa wants Syria to become a unitary civil democratic state.

=== Reorganisation under the SDF banner ===
In November 2015, the group merged with Tribal Army of Tell Abyad to form Jabhat Thuwar al-Raqqa which became part of a greater coalition in northern Syria. However, some members of Jabhat Thuwar al-Raqqa did not join the SDF, despite the leadership joining. Tensions between the People's Protection Units (YPG) and the Tribal Army grew after alleged YPG atrocities against the Arab populations of northern Syria. In response the YPG with their Arab allies blockaded the region held by Jabhat Thuwar al-Raqqa, after ISIL attacks increased from the region held by Jabhat Thuwar al-Raqqa, which became susceptible to an Islamic State of Iraq and the Levant attack in late December 2015. On 6 January 2016, the group issued a statement claiming it was disbanding as a consequence of the blockade, although the cause of the disbanding has been disputed. After disbanding they continued to use the Jabhat Thuwar al-Raqqa name. In late 2015, the group reappeared, announcing it had decided to join the Syrian Democratic Forces.

On 20 October 2016, Thuwar al-Raqqa established an all-female battalion named the "Free Women of Raqqa Battalion".

Three of Jabhat Thuwar al-Raqqa's former subgroups, the Raqqa Hawks Brigade, Raqqa Martyrs Brigade, and the Free Men of Raqqa Brigade, participated in the Raqqa campaign. while Jabhat Thuwar al-Raqqa was planned to be involved in taking the city itself.

During the Raqqa offensive, Liwa Thuwar al-Raqqa's political bureau condemned the offensive for being led by the YPG. This caused tensions between the group's political bureau, who opposes the YPG, and the overall leader and military commander of Jabhat Thuwar al-Raqqa, Abu Issa, who is allied with the YPG. In response, the SDF besieged and raided the group's headquarter.

On 10 December 2016, the second phase of the Raqqa campaign was announced. Jabhat Thuwar al-Raqqa participated in the offensive under the SDF. Tensions rose again on 25 December and several military commanders in Jabhat Thuwar al-Raqqa reportedly announced their defection to the Raqqa Hawks Brigade. 2 days later, the Thuwar al-Raqqa commanders declared on video that they were captured by the Raqqa Hawks Brigade and forced to announce their defection, and that they are still with Thuwar al-Raqqa.

On 19 May 2017, Jabhat Thuwar al-Raqqa held a meeting with other SDF member groups in negotiating the role that the former would play in the Raqqa campaign. After SDF commander Hussam Awak promised the unit that "its role [in Raqqa] will be essential, especially in the civil and humanitarian affairs", Jabhat Thuwar al-Raqqa sent a convoy of troops to participate in the offensive.

In May 2018, tensions began to build up between members of Arab tribes, including Liwa Thuwar al-Raqqa, and the rest of the SDF and the Raqqa Internal Security Forces (RISF) over recruitment issues in Raqqa. A curfew was put in place in both Raqqa city and the rest of the governorate on 23 June, as the SDF and RISF besieged Thuwar al-Raqqa's headquarters and arrested between 90 and 200 of its members the next day. By 25 June, the SDF and RISF captured all of Thuwar al-Raqqa fighters and their weapons in Raqqa, completely defeating the group, and the curfew was ended.

Following Liwa Thuwar al-Raqqa's defeat by the SDF and RISF, Abu Issa met with tribal leaders and SDF officials to discuss surrender and reconciliation. He was reportedly offered a position in the SDF general command. Abu Issa would later go on to deny he was ever arrested by the SDF or the RISF.

In January 2023, it was reported that the United States was looking to re-establish Liwa Thuwar al-Raqqa and redeploy it in the city of Raqqa. Since at least 2023, Abu Issa has used the group's symbol and name despite its effective disbandment. He signed a statement supporting the anti-SDF Arab tribes during the 2023 Deir ez-Zor clashes.

== See also ==
- List of armed groups in the Syrian Civil War
