= Al-Thawra =

Al-Thawra or Al-Thawrah (Arabic: الثورة, meaning "The Revolution") may refer to:

- Al-Thawra (band), an experimental metal punk band from Chicago
- Al-Thawra Al-Souria (newspaper),formerly Ath-Thawra, a Syrian state-owned newspaper
- Al-Thawra (Libya), a daily newspaper in Tripoli (1969–1972)
- Al-Thawra (Yemen), a Houthi-owned newspaper
- Al-Thawrah (Syria), former name of Tabqa, a city in Raqqa Governorate, Syria
- Al-Thawrah subdistrict, former name of Tabqa Subdistrict, containing the Syrian city
- Al-Thawrah District, former name of Tabqa District, containing the Syrian city
- Al-Thawra Dam or Tabqa Dam, an embankment on the Euphrates in Raqqa Governorate, Syria
- Al-Thawrah, Hama Governorate, a village in Al-Suqaylabiyah District, Syria
- Al-Thawra, former name of Sadr City, a district of Baghdad, Iraq
- Al-Thawra SC, a football team in Kirkuk, Iraq
- Al-Thawra SC (women's basketball), a department of Al Thawra Sports Club in Damascus, Syria
- Althawra Sports City Stadium, a multi-purpose venue in Sanaa, Yemen
