= Mahmudli =

- Town
- Location in Syria
- Coordinates: 36.013°N 38.545°E
- Country: Syria
- Governorate: Raqqa
- District: Al-Tabqah District
- Subdistrict: Al-Jarniyah Subdistrict

Population (2004)
  - Total: 2,713
- Time zone: UTC+2 (EET)
  - Summer (DST): UTC+3 (EEST)

Mahmudli (Arabic: المحمودلي) is a Syrian town located in Raqqa Governorate approximately 20 km north of Al-Tabqah on the road from Tishrin to Raqqa. The town is populated by Arabs.

During the Syrian Civil War, the town was occupied by the self-proclaimed Islamic State from May 2014 onward for almost three years. On 1 January 2017, the Syrian Democratic Forces captured Mahmudli after two days of intense clashes.
