= Al-Rusafa =

Al-Rusafa (also spelled Rusafa, Rassafah, Resafe, Rosafeh) refers to the following places in the Middle East:

- Al-Rusafa, Syria, a village and ruined fortress in northwestern Syria
- Resafa, an archaeological site in north-central Syria
- Al-Rusafa, Iraq, a region of Baghdad, Iraq
- Russafa, a neighbourhood within the Eixample district of València, Spain
