= Battle of Tabqa =

2017 battle of the Syrian civil war

- Part of the American-led intervention in Syria, the International military intervention against ISIL, the Raqqa campaign (2016–17), the Syrian Civil War, and the Rojava–Islamist conflict
- Map of the operation to capture the Tabqa region
Date	22 March – 10 May 2017 (1 month, 2 weeks and 4 days)
Location	Tabqa District, Raqqa Governorate, Syria 35.8367°N 38.5481°E
Result	Major SDF victory
Territorial changes	The SDF gains a foothold south of the Euphrates; The SDF captures Tabqa Airbase, Tabqa city, Tabqa Dam, and more than 8 villages

Belligerents
Syrian Democratic Forces; Asayish; CJTF–OIR: United States; United Kingdom; France; Iraqi Kurdistan	Islamic State

Commanders and leaders
Rojda Felat; Qandil Manbij; Unidentified YPJ commander †	(Islamic State) Unidentified high-ranking ISIL commander (WIA) (POW) (Islamic State) Abu Umar al-Almani † (Islamic State) Abu Zubeyir †

Units involved
Syrian Democratic Forces; YPG; YPG International; YPJ; Raqqa Hawks Brigade; Manbij Military Council; Northern Sun Battalion; Soldiers of the Two Holy Mosques Brigade; Euphrates Liberation Brigade; Asayish; SWAT Units (HAT); United States Armed Forces; United States Marine Corps; 11th Marine Expeditionary Unit; United States special operations forces; United States Air Force; (United Kingdom) British Armed Forces: Special Air Service; Iraqi Kurdistan: CTG Special Forces	Military of ISIL: Ingimassayeen elite units; Al-Khansaa Brigade

Strength
SDF: 1,000–3,000 fighters (United States) US: 500 Special Forces	1,300–2,000

Casualties and losses
100 killed (U.S. claim), 66+ killed (various claims), 300+ wounded 370 killed and wounded (ISIL claim)	133–340 killed (SDF claim)
- 7,000+ civilians displaced

The Battle of Tabqa was a Syrian Democratic Forces (SDF) military operation against the Islamic State (IS) to capture and secure the Tabqa Dam, Tabqa (al-Thawrah), Tabqa Airbase, and the surrounding countryside during the 2016–2017 Raqqa campaign of the larger Rojava-Islamist conflict of the Syrian civil war. The SDF assault began on 22 March 2017, and resulted in the capture of Tabqa and the Tabqa Dam on 10 May 2017. The SDF was supported by the United States-led CJTF–OIR coalition during the battle.

== Background ==
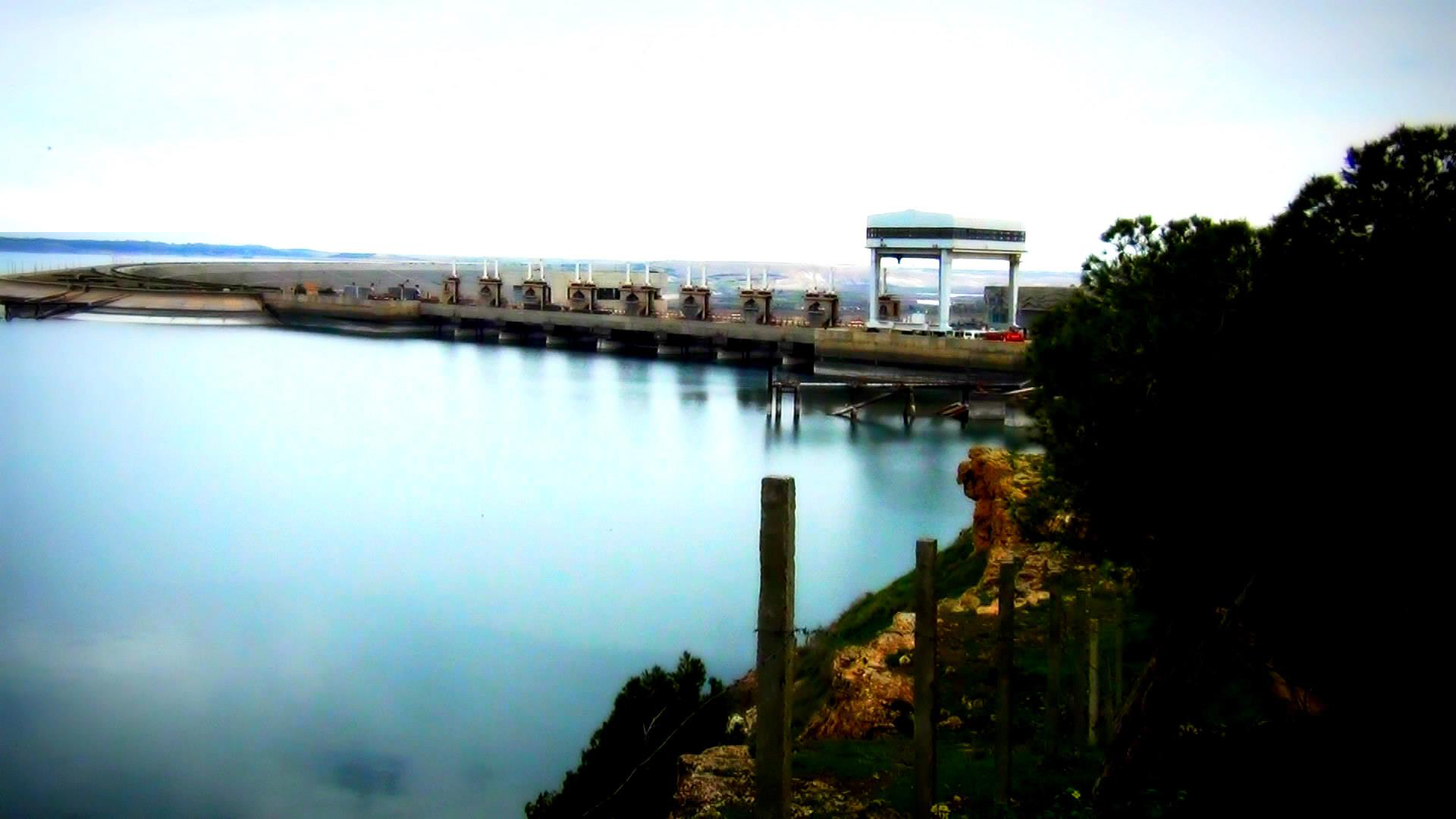
The Tabqa Dam in 2014

The Syrian Democratic Forces, seeking to capture Raqqa from the Islamic State, positioned themselves around the city as part of the second phase of their regional campaign. However, as part of this, they encountered ISIL forces dug in around the Tabqa Dam, west of Raqqa. Because of the dam's fragility and strategic importance, the SDF could not immediately advance on the dam, and there were concerns it could break and cause flooding. ISIL had previously threatened to open the floodgates if the dam was attacked, which would destroy many villages downstream.

=== Initial assault ===
In late January 2017, it was reported that a number of ISIL militants were hiding inside the structure of the Tabqa Dam with senior militant leaders–who used to be "very important prisoners" wanted by the US and several other countries–in order to deter a possible CJTF–OIR coalition strike on these targets.

As part of a series of probing attacks in January 2017, US special forces crossed the Euphrates in amphibious raids, including a raid by a combined SDF-U.S. special forces contingent on the Tabqa Dam and the nearby city of Tabqa (al-Thawrah). Following the raids, ISIL counterattacked the SDF positions, but the counterattacks were largely repelled.

== The offensive ==
=== Assault on Tabqa Dam and Tabqa Airbase ===
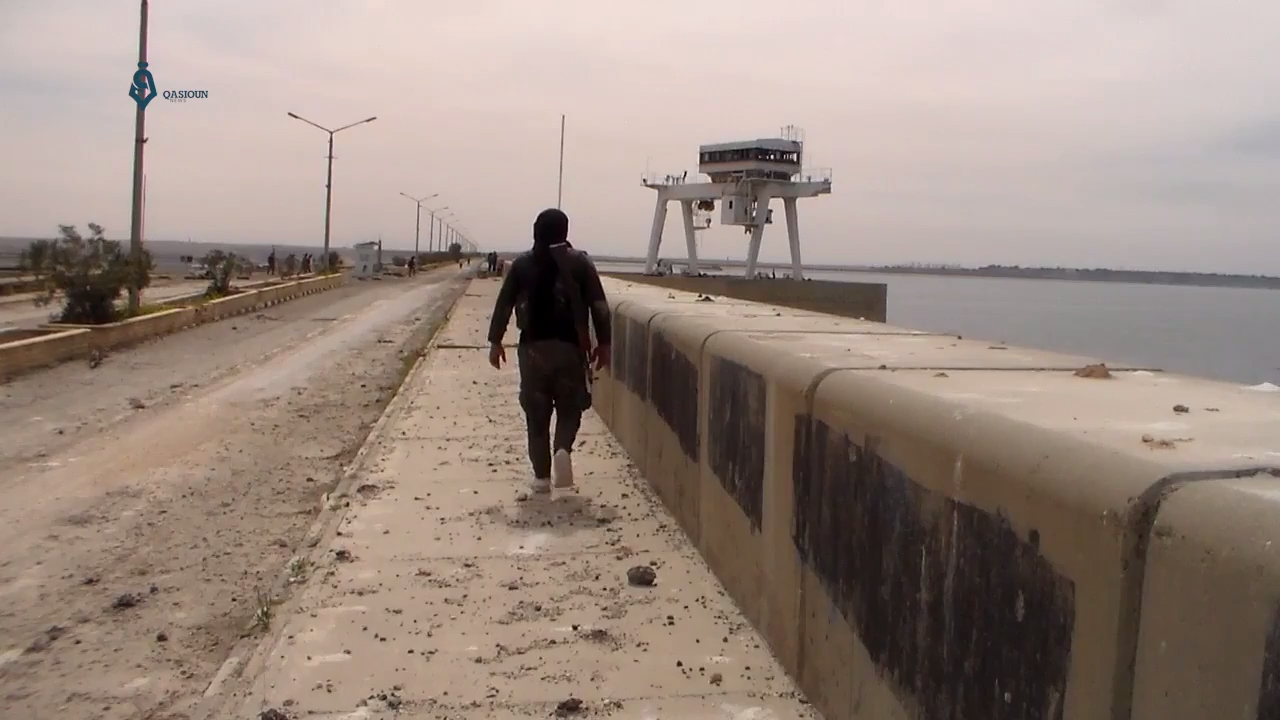
SDF fighters near Tabqa Dam

On 22 March, the SDF began an assault to capture the Tabqa Dam, Tabqa (al-Thawrah) city, and the Tabqa Airbase. Five hundred SDF fighters and additional US soldiers of the CJTF–OIR were airlifted by US V-22 Osprey helicopters across the Euphrates river and Lake Assad and were dropped on the Shurfa Peninsula to the west of Tabqa city. US air support assets and artillery units from the United States Marines supported the assault. SDF and US forces also landed on the Jazirat al-'Ayd Island (or Peninsula) to the west of Tabqa Dam, capturing it as well. The airlift of forces behind enemy lines was described by Pentagon spokesman Eric Pahon as a large high-priority offensive and announced that the advance had cut off the highway linking the Aleppo, Deir ez-Zor, and Raqqa Governorates. He added that around 75-80% of the attacking force consisted of Arab fighters, with the rest being Kurds in the YPG and the YPJ. Four towns were also seized as part of the landings and it was believed that the dam and general area were held by hundreds of ISIL fighters, many of them foreign fighters. The SDF stated that the advance was also meant to block any advance on Raqqa by the Syrian Arab Army from the west.

On 24 March, SDF spokeswoman Jihan Sheikh Ahmed announced that they had reached the Tabqa Dam and were fighting ISIL at its entrance. The assault on the dam was spearheaded by SDF fighters who were supported by US special forces personnel. It was also reported that the SDF had captured eight villages to the southwest of Tabqa city. ISIL's Amaq News Agency outlet meanwhile claimed the SDF had withdrawn from the dam. Jabhat Thuwar al-Raqqa claimed online that the SDF had captured the Tabqa Airbase; however, Al-Masdar News stated that the SDF's open room had stated that the claim was completely fabricated.

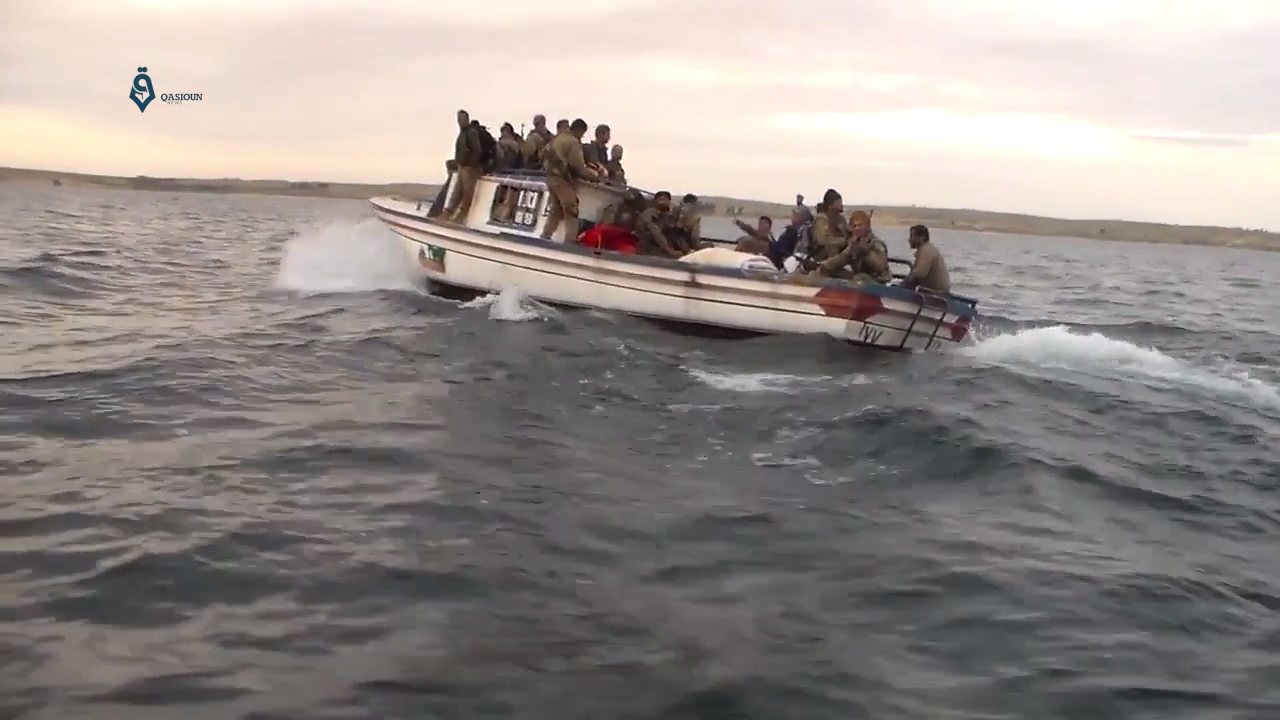
A boat carrying SDF fighters across Lake Assad

On 26 March, the SDF captured two villages to the east of Tabqa. It was also reported that ISIL was shelling the surroundings of Tabqa Dam with heavy weaponry. On the same day, ISIL claimed that Tabqa Dam was on the verge of collapse and that all the floodgates were closed. The dam was reported to have become inoperable, which ISIL claimed was due to US-led coalition bombing and artillery strikes, though the Syrian Observatory for Human Rights (SOHR) stated that the actual reasons were unknown, adding that ISIL still held its main building and turbines. That day, US aircraft had dropped three 2,000 pound bombs against the towers attached to the dam, causing critical equipment to fail and the dam to stop functioning. One of the bombs failed to detonate. The dam almost failed as the floodgates were rendered inoperable, but an emergency ceasefire coordinated between the Islamic State, Syrian government, and the United States let engineers make emergency repairs before the dam collapsed, which could have potentially killed thousands of civilians.

The SDF however denied that it had been hit, while the RBSS (Raqqa Is Being Slaughtered Silently) group stated that ISIL was informing fleeing civilians that the dam was safe. Additionally, the coalition stated that the Tabqa Dam was structurally sound, and that the dam had not been targeted by any airstrikes. They also stated that the SDF controlled an emergency spillway at the northern part of the dam, which could be used in the event of an emergency. On the same day, SDF spokesman Talal Silo announced that the SDF had stormed the Tabqa military airport, and had taken 60-70% of it. They later announced that they had completely captured the Tabqa Airbase, following a 24-hour battle. ISIL fighters stationed at Tabqa Airbase were reported to have withdrawn northward to Tabqa city. Additionally, SDF forces captured two villages near the airbase during the advance.

ISIL was reported to have reversed an earlier evacuation order in Raqqa, stating that the dam was safe and ordered civilians to remain in the city. A day later, however, the SDF announced they were temporarily pausing their offensive for the dam. Later in the day, a spokeswoman of the SDF announced that engineers who had been permitted to check the dam and its operations did not find it was damaged or malfunctioning. On 28 March, ISIL deployed an additional 900 fighters to the Tabqa District in an attempt to stop the SDF advances.

=== Besieging Tabqa city ===
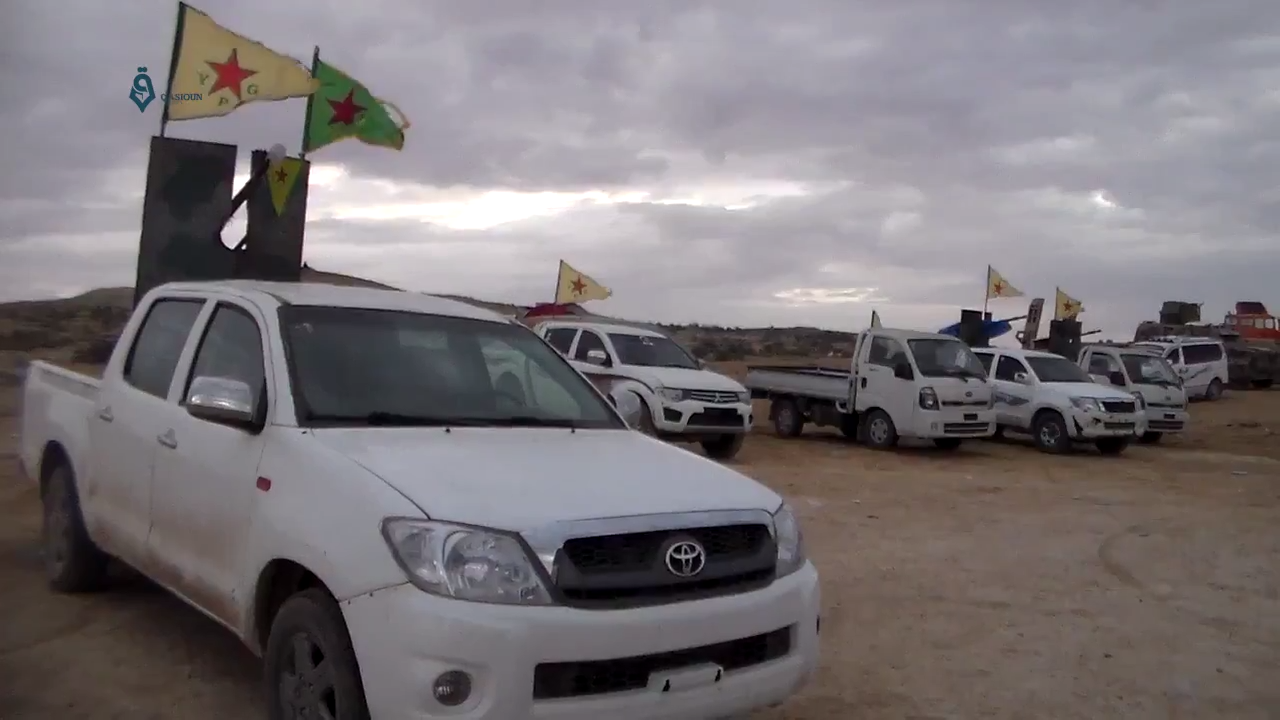
Toyota Hilux and other technicals of the YPG and YPJ near Tabqa

On 29 March, the SDF cut the road between Tabqa (al-Thawrah) city and Raqqa. The SDF stated that ISIL had shelled the Tabqa Dam during the day, causing repair work to be temporarily paused. On 31 March, SDF forces attacked the town of al-Safsafah, located east of Tabqa, nearly besieging the city.

The SDF and some activists stated on 2 April that it had repelled a major ISIL counterattack to the northeast of Tabqa city, near the Tabqa Dam, and near the Tabqa airbase. They also continued to advance in villages to the east of Tabqa city. On the same day, it was reported that the SDF had completely besieged Tabqah city, with Kurdish activists stating that two SDF units linked up to the east of the city. SOHR, however, stated that they were still trying to besiege the city. SDF fighters continued battling for Safsafah and Ibad on the next day while attempting to fully encircle Tabqa. Meanwhile, on 3 April, it was reported that ISIL was possibly in the process of moving its capital from Raqqa city to Mayadin, in the Deir ez-Zor Governorate. This followed months of gradual relocation of resources and senior ISIL leaders from Raqqa to Mayadin. The SDF entered and besieged Safsafah on 5 April, thus also besieging Tabqa city while claiming that it had also taken control of a major part of Safsafah. The village was captured by the next day, resulting in the SDF completely encircling Tabqa city.

The SDF captured Ibad village, located east of Safsafah, on 9 April, further expanding their control in the eastern countryside of Tabqa, while more than 25 ISIL fighters were killed in the clashes. ISIL launched unsuccessful counterattacks on Safsafah, while also attacking Tabqa airbase. The SDF captured another village near Tabqa on the next day.

On 11 April, the US-led coalition reported that the SDF had captured 60% of Tabqa Dam, and that they were "very close" to liberating it. On 13 April, the US military stated that CJTF-OIR had bombed an SDF fighting position near Tabqa as it was misidentified as belonging to ISIL. It added that the airstrikes resulted in the deaths of 18 SDF fighters.

=== Battle for Tabqa city ===
On 15 April, the SDF advanced within "hundreds of metres" of Tabqa, and fighting reached two suburbs of the city. Later on the same day, the SDF entered the city from the east and the west, capturing the entire Alexandria suburb in the southern sector, bringing 15% of the city under SDF control. On 17 April, the SDF advanced further, bringing 20% of Tabqa city under their control. On the same day, it was announced that 200 fighters from the Manbij Military Council would participate in this part of the battle, resulting in a total of 350 personnel. On 18 April, the SDF captured the ISIL radio station in the city. In the following days, the SDF accelerated their operations in Tabqa and, by 22 April, managed to secure a quarter of the city.

The SDF advanced in Tabqa city again on 30 April, claiming to have captured six more districts, while ISIL only controlled the northern part of the town near Tabqa dam. SOHR stated that the SDF controlled at least 40% of the city by this time, including more than half of the Old City area. Later on the same day, it was reported that the SDF had captured at least 60% of the city. The next day the SDF stated that it had completely captured the Old City, leaving ISIL in control of only the newer areas of the town, alongside the dam. SOHR stated that the SDF controlled about 80% of the city.

On 2 May, the SDF stated that it had captured about 90% of the city amid reports of negotiations between Kurdish fighters and ISIL to allow the latter to withdraw from the remaining areas under its control. By 3 May, the SDF had almost captured the entire city except for a small northern area and district near the dam. ISIL also carried out more counterattacks in and near Tabqa. It was later reported that a deal had been reached to allow remaining ISIL fighters to withdraw from the city as well as the dam. The SDF and its commanders however denied any deal had been reached, adding that clashes were still ongoing against ISIL in a village near Tabqa and the three northern districts of the town, including some militants who were hiding among civilians.

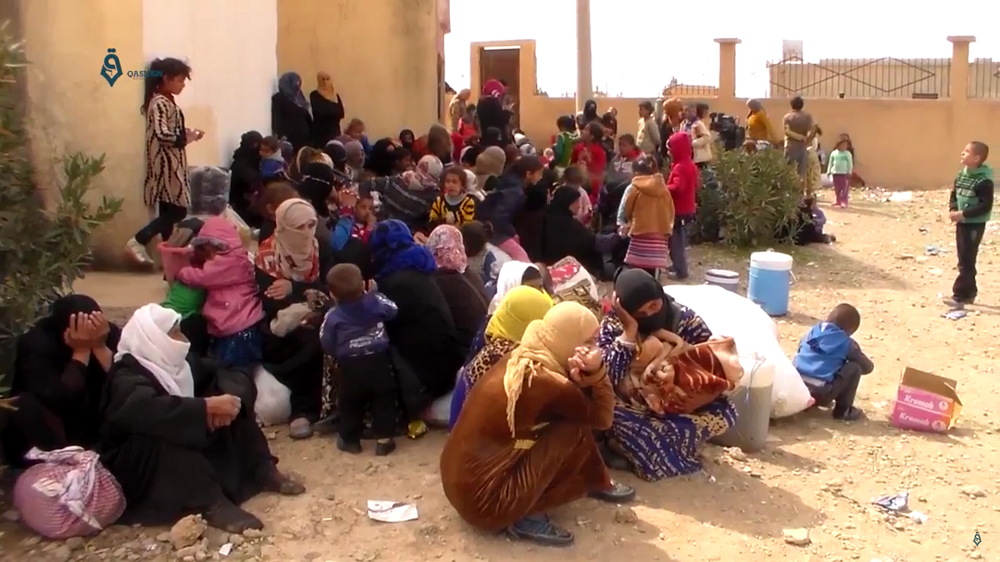
Refugees fleeing the clashes in Tabqa

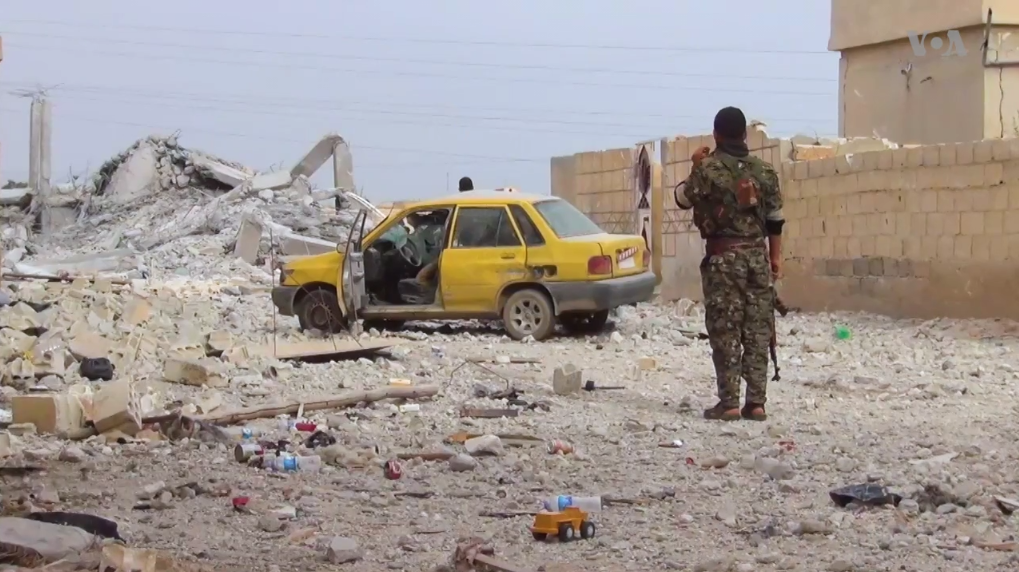
An SDF fighter stands in a destroyed area of Tabqa

By 10 May, there were still two ISIL holdouts in the Tabqa area. On one side, 14 Chechen and French African ISIL fighters, members of an elite "ingimassayeen" unit, still held the control room, the floodgates, and a number of tunnels inside Tabqa Dam. Even though they were left without light or fresh air, as the SDF had shut down all electricity to the dam, and without means to communicate with their allies due to the coalition jamming their radio frequencies, these ISIL fighters had resisted attempts to clear them out for weeks. The second, bigger holdout was in northern Tabqa city, where around 50 ISIL militants still defended a number of highly fortified apartments. In the course of 10 May, however, this last resistance was finally broken, when the remaining ISIL defenders surrendered or fled. According to United States Central Command, the Islamists had acceded to the SDF's demand of dismantling the IEDs surrounding the dam. The coalition stated that it tracked those militants who fled and targeted those who could be killed without harming civilians. At 16:00 on that day, SDF commander Rojda Felat stated that the Tabqa Dam had been completely captured by the SDF. The SDF conducted clearance and de-mining operations after the capture and hunted for any remaining ISIL holdouts. After the battle, thousands of the local Arab population joined the SDF.

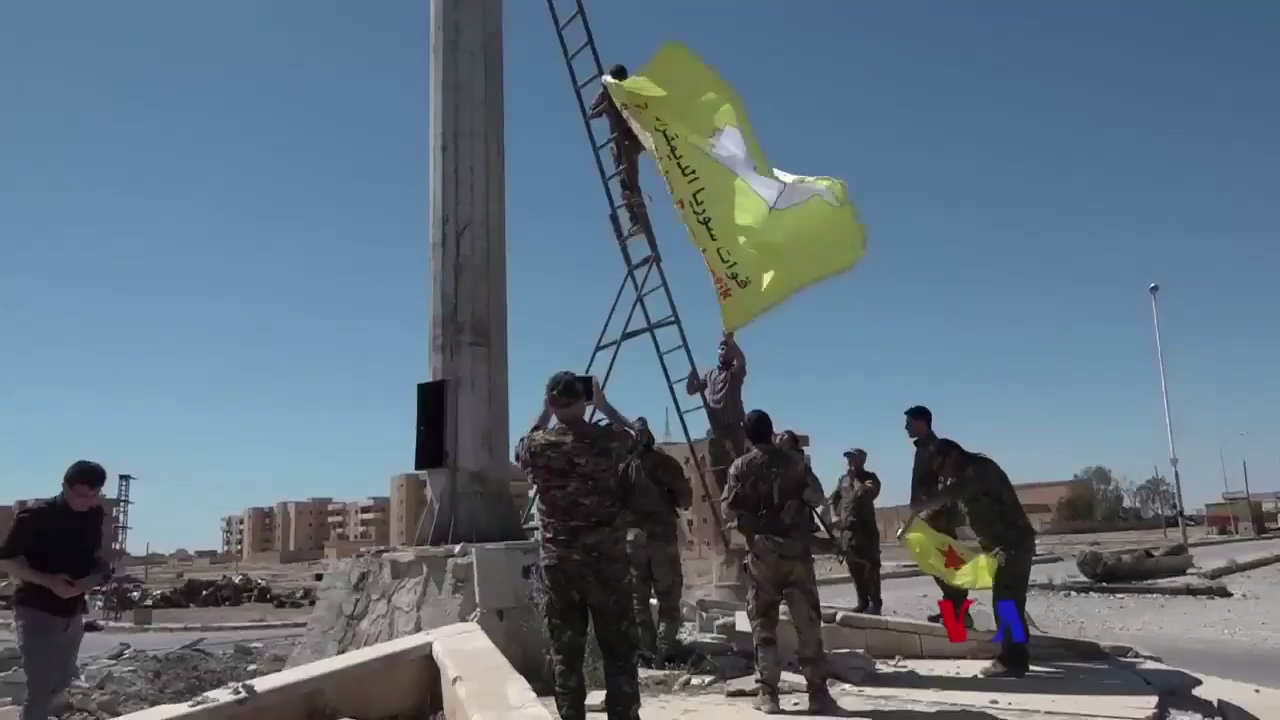
SDF fighters raise their flag in Tabqa

== See also ==
- Battle for Mosul Dam
- Battle of Tabqa Airbase
- Battle of Raqqa (2017)
- Manbij offensive (2016)
- Tishrin Dam offensive
