= Al-Mansurah, Raqqa Governorate =

Al-Mansurah المنصورة
- Town
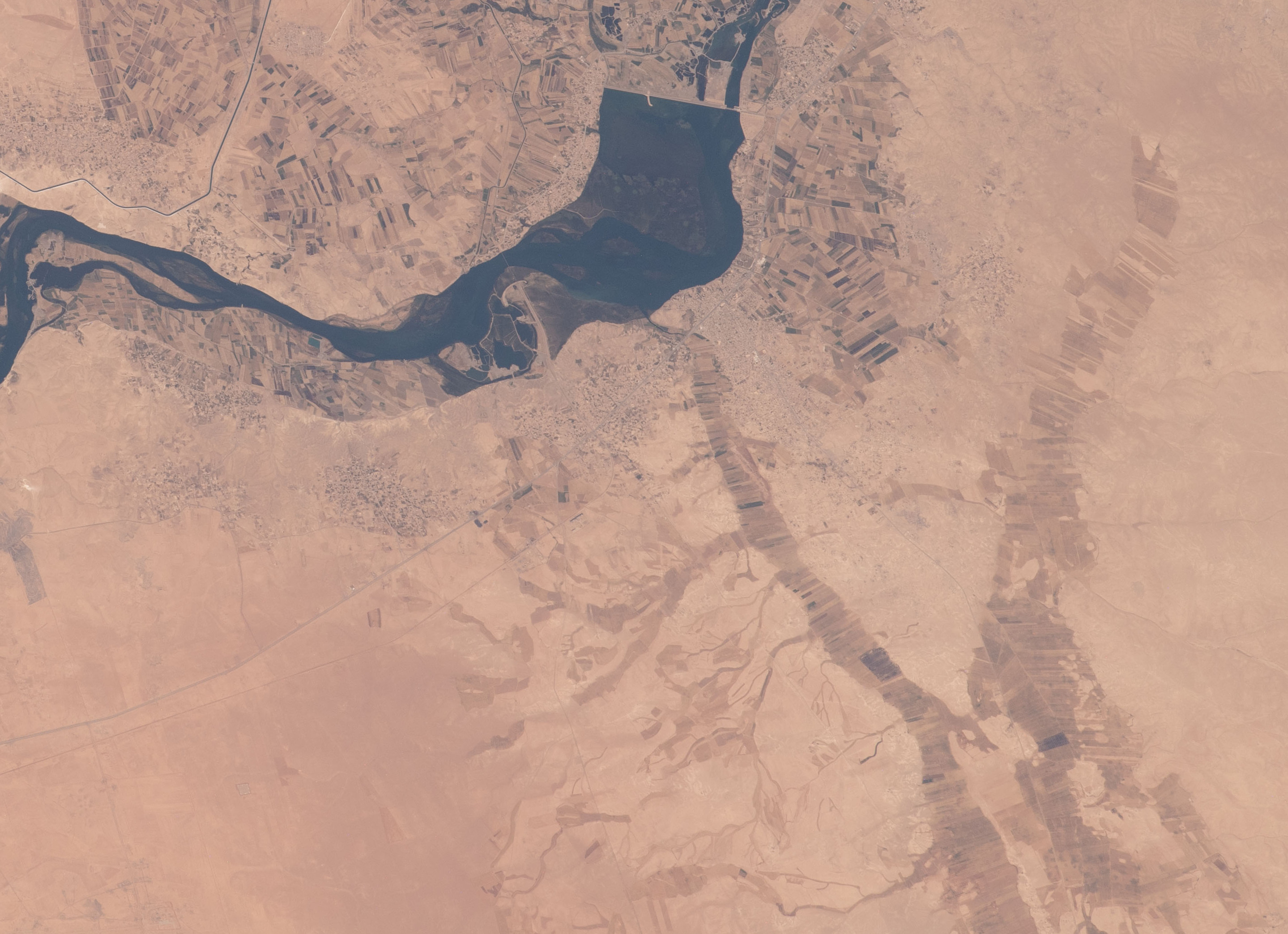
- river Euphrates, al-Mansurah 2022

- Location in Syria
- Coordinates: 35°50′16″N 38°44′47″E
- Country: Syria
- Governorate: Raqqa
- District: Tabqa
- Subdistrict: al-Mansurah

Population (2004)
  - Total: 16,158
- Time zone: UTC+3 (AST)
- City Qrya Pcode: C5942

Al-Mansurah (Arabic: المنصورة) is a Syrian town located in Al-Tabqah District, Raqqa. According to the Syria Central Bureau of Statistics (CBS), Al-Mansurah had a population of 16,158 in the 2004 census.
