= Abu Umar al-Almani =

- Born: Yamin Abou-Zand; 1986; Stuttgart, Germany
- Died: March 25, 2017 (aged 30–31); Near Tabqa Dam, Syria
- Military career
- Allegiance: Islamic State
- Branch: Military of the Islamic State: Millatu Ibrahim
- Service years: 2015–2017
- Rank: Emir in the Al-Thawrah District
- Conflicts: War on terror: War against the Islamic State: American-led intervention in Syria; Syrian Civil War: Palmyra offensive (July–August 2015); Raqqa campaign (2016–2017); Battle of Tabqa (2017) †

Yamin Abou-Zand (1986 – 25 March 2017), better known by his nom de guerre Abu Umar al-Almani (Arabic: أبو عمر الألماني; Abū ʿUmar al-Almānī), was a prominent German commander of the Islamic State. He gained notoriety by appearing in the first German IS propaganda video in 2015, and went on to fight for the militant organization until 2017, when he was killed in action against the Syrian Democratic Forces during the fighting for the Tabqa Dam (Euphrates Dam) in the Raqqa campaign.

== Biography ==
Born in 1986 in Stuttgart into a partially German Muslim family, Yamin Abou-Zand grew up in Baden-Württemberg until moving with his parents to Königswinter in 2000. There, he married a German Muslim and rented his own apartment. The couple had no children and lived secluded, though neighbors said that they were generally nice people. Yamin also began working at the Deutsche Telekom in the department for Recruiting and Talent-Acquisition, where he was initially considered to be a "promising, committed and very courteous employee". (Note: Translated from German; in the original this reads: "vielversprechender, engagierter und sehr höflicher Mitarbeiter".) In late-2013, his co-workers noticed that he became increasingly extremist in his religious views. Eventually, he began to openly express sympathy for IS, whereupon the Telekom reported him to the German security agencies. Yamin eventually quit his job in late-2014. In early-2015, he and his wife disappeared without informing their families, who reported them missing to local authorities. The two appear to have travelled to Turkey, and from there to Syria in order to join IS. Soon after, Yamin adopted his nom de guerre "Abu Umar al-Almani" and joined Millatu Ibrahim, a German Salafist organization led by the Austrian Mohamed Mahmoud that had become a unit of the Islamic State's military.

He gained prominence in August 2015 by appearing in the first IS propaganda video in German together with Mohamed Mahmoud. In the video, shot in Palmyra, the two tried to encourage German Muslims to travel to Syria and join IS. Abu Umar claimed that "the jihad is like vacation for us. We are here at one of the most beautiful places in Syria." (Note: Translated from German; in the original this reads: "Der Dschihad ist tatsächlich Urlaub für uns. Wir sind hier an einem der schönsten Orte Syriens.") In the case German jihadists could not travel to Syria, he ordered them instead to commit terrorist attacks in Germany and Austria, saying that they should "attack the kuffar, in their own homes! Kill them where you find them!" (Note: Translated from German; in the original this reads: "Greift die Kuffar an, in ihren eigenen Häusern! Tötet sie dort, wo ihr sie findet!") The two IS fighters justified this as revenge for the German support of the anti-IS coalition, and the Bundeswehr mission in Afghanistan. Abu Umar then proceeded to execute a captured Syrian Army soldier. Since his appearance in the propaganda video, Abu Umar was wanted by the German security services for murder and war crimes. German Salafists, including those with sympathies for IS and al-Qaeda, widely condemned the execution and the video, with prominent Islamist Bernhard Falk (de) calling Abu Umar a psychopath.

In course of the following year, Abu Umar became an emir and one of the leading IS commanders in the Al-Thawrah District, where he helped to organize the defenses against the SDF-led Raqqa offensive. On 25 March 2017, he was killed with three of his bodyguards by YPJ fighters during clashes near Tabqa Dam.
