= Resafa =

Al-Resafa الرصافة
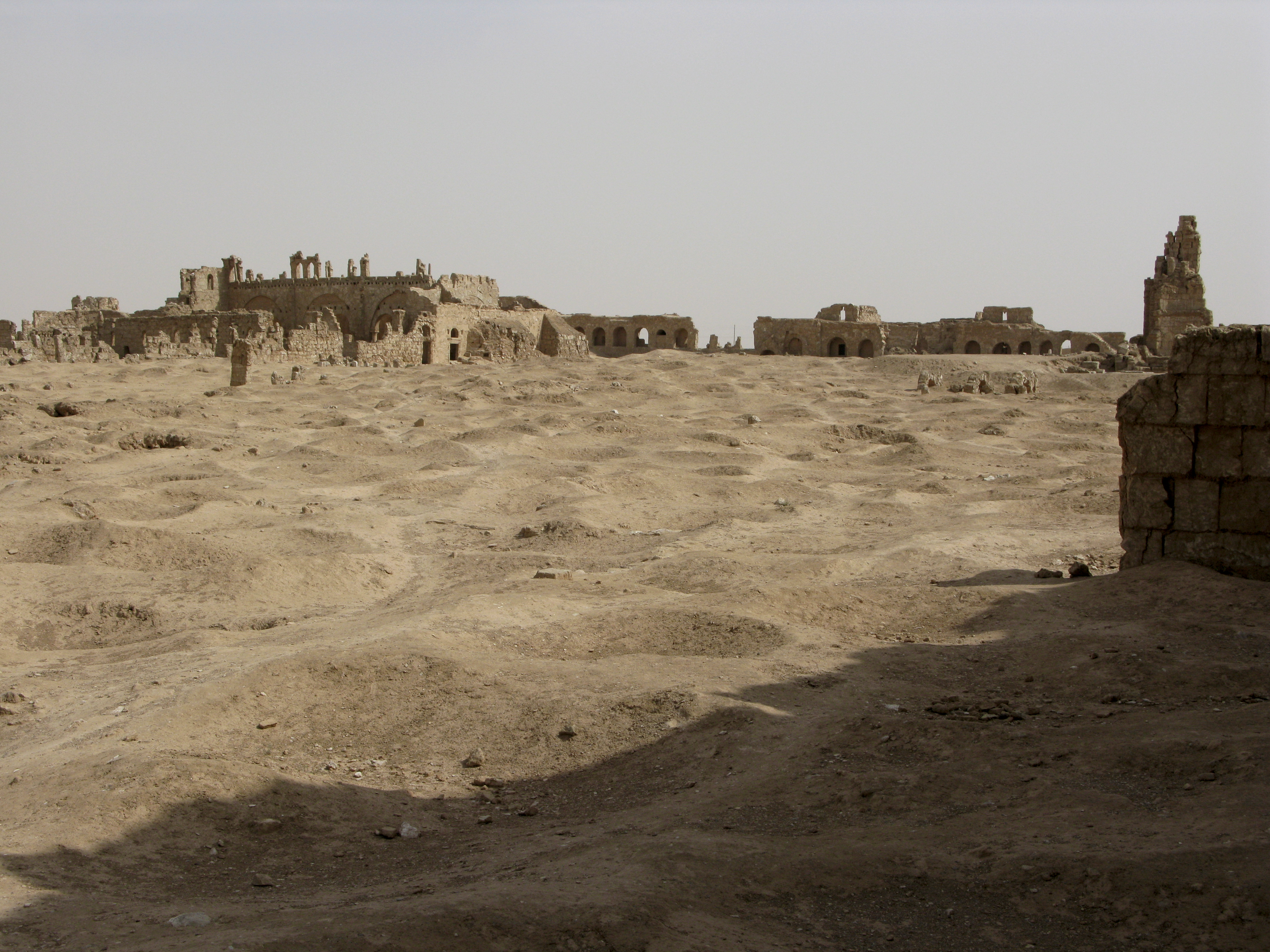
- Panoramic view of Resafa

- Location in Syria
- Coordinates: 35°37′40″N 38°45′23″E
- Country: Syria
- Governorate: Ar Raqqa
- District: Tabqa
- Sub district: Mansurah
- Control: Syria
- Elevation: 300 m (980 ft)

Resafa (Arabic: الرصافة, romanized: Reṣafa), sometimes spelled Rusafa, and known in the Byzantine era as Sergiopolis (Greek: Σεργιούπολις or Σεργιόπολις, lit. 'city of Saint Sergius') and briefly as Anastasiopolis (Αναστασιόπολις, lit. 'city of Anastasius'), was a city located in the Roman province of Euphratensis, in modern-day Syria. It is an archaeological site situated southwest of the city of Raqqa and the Euphrates.

Procopius describes at length the ramparts and buildings erected there by Justinian. The walls of Resafa, which are still well preserved, are over 1600 feet in length and about 1000 feet in width; round or square towers were erected about every hundred feet; there are also ruins of a church with three apses.

== Names ==
Resafa corresponds to the Akkadian Raṣappa and the Biblical Rezeph (Septuagint; Koine Greek: Ράφες), where it is mentioned in Isaiah 37:12; cuneiform sources give Rasaappa, Rasappa, and Rasapi.

Ptolemy calls it Rhesapha (Koine Greek: Ρεσαφα). In the late Roman Tabula Peutingeriana, it is called Risapa. In the Notitia dignitatum, it is Rosafa.

Procopius write that it was called Sergiopolis after the Saint Sergius.

== History ==
=== Antiquity ===
The site dates to the 9th century BC, when a military camp was built by the Assyrians.

During Roman times, it was a desert outpost fortified to defend against the Sasanian Empire and a station on the Strata Diocletiana. It flourished as its location on the caravan routes linking Aleppo, Dura-Europos, and Palmyra was ideal.

Resafa had no spring or running water, so it depended on large cisterns to capture the winter and spring rains.

In the 4th century, it became a pilgrimage town for Christians coming to venerate Saint Sergius, a Christian Roman soldier said to have been martyred in Resafa during the Diocletianic Persecution. A church was built to mark his grave, the city was renamed Sergiopolis and began to grow massively. Indeed, it became, after Jerusalem, "most important pilgrimage center in Byzantine Orientis in [the] proto-Byzantine period", with a special appeal to the local Arabs, especially the Ghassanids. Resafa was located in the area of the Roman–Persian Wars, and was therefore a well-defended city that had massive walls that surrounded it without a break.

By the late 6th century, the Ghassanids' tribal Arab ally the Bahra' were tasked with guarding Resafa and its shrine from nomadic marauders and the Lakhmids of Mesopotamia.

=== Muslim conquest to 13th century ===
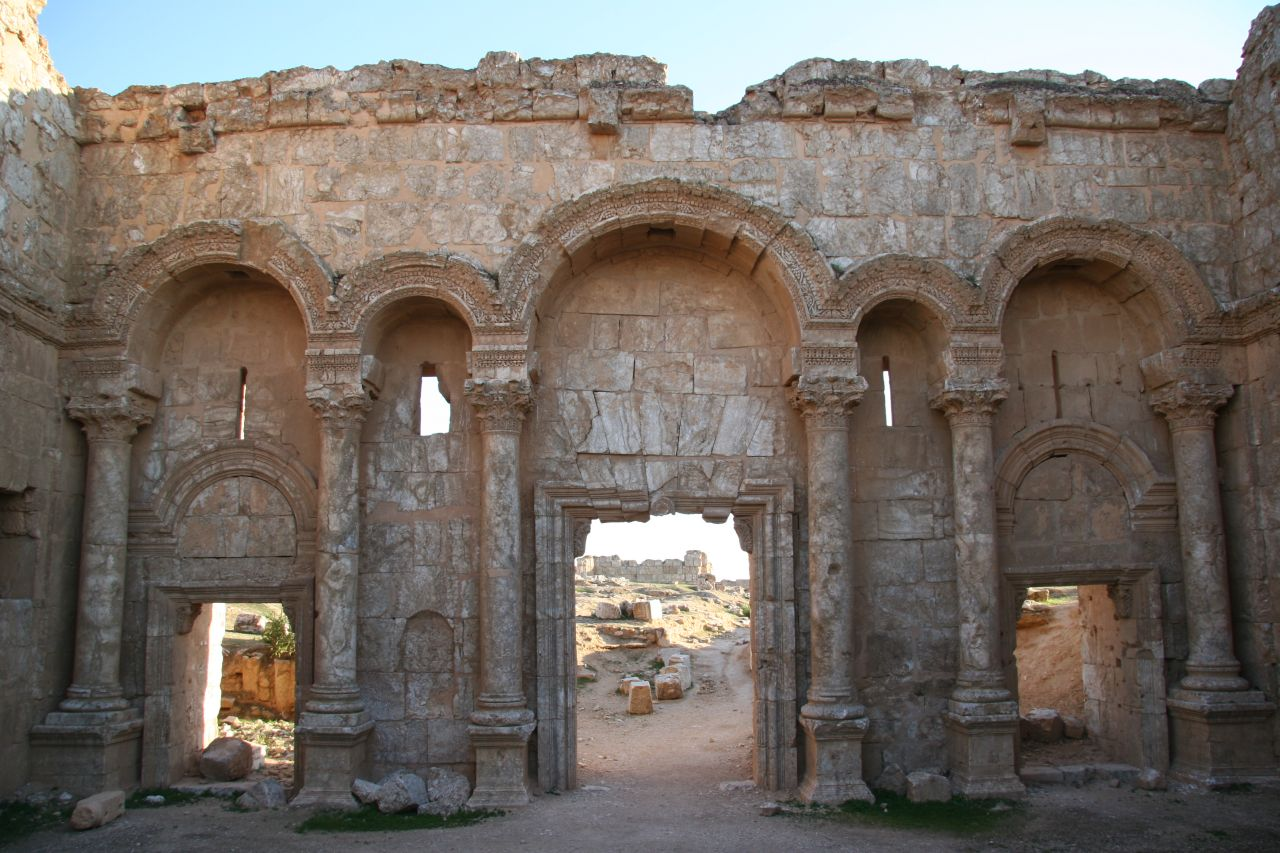
North gate of the city of Resafa, site of Hisham's palace and court

The city was lost by the Byzantines in the 7th century when the Arabs won the final victory at the Battle of Yarmouk in the year 636. In the eighth century, the Umayyad caliph Hisham ibn Abd al-Malik (r. 724–743) made the city his favoured residence, and built several palaces around it, which are counted among the qasr or desert castle category.

The city was finally abandoned in the 13th century when the Mongols invaded the area.

=== Civil War, 2011-2017 ===
In the Syrian Civil War, the town was occupied by ISIS, before being liberated by Government forces on 19 June 2017 during the Southern Raqqa Offensive.

== Ecclesiastical history ==
Sergiopolis's first bishop was appointed shortly after 431 by John of Antioch, in spite of the opposition of the Metropolitan of Hierapolis Bambyce, on whom that church had till then depended. Later, Marianus attended a Council of Antioch.

Sergiopolis obtained the title of metropolis from Emperor Anastasius I. With five suffragan sees, it figures in the Notitia episcopatuum of Antioch in the sixth century. A bishop named Sergius or George was an envoy of Justinian to the Lakhmids around 524. At the fifth general council (Second Council of Constantinople) in 553, Abraham signed as metropolitan. The favors of Anastasius obtained for the city the name of Anastasiopolis, which it still retained at the beginning of the seventh century. Bishop Candidus, at the time of the Sassanian Persian siege of the city by Khosrau I (in 543), ransomed 1,200 captives for two hundred pounds of gold, and, in 1093, Metropolitan Simeon restored the great Basilica ("Échos d'Orient", III, 238); which attests to the continuing existence of Christianity in Rasafa.

=== Titular see(s) ===
The (arch)diocese of Sergiopolis was nominally restored as a Roman Catholic titular bishopric, initially of the lowest (episcopal) rank, and under the curiate name Sergiopolis antea Resapha (having namesakes see Sergiopolis), and had the following incumbents as such:

- Titular Bishop Ján Gustíni-Zubrohlavský (1762.05.13 – 1763.11.29)
- Titular Bishop Eugenio Giovanni Battista Cerina, Friars Minor (O.F.M.) (1803.09.26 – 1827.05.30)
- Titular Bishop Adrien-Hyppolyte Languillat (郎懷仁), Jesuits S.J. (1856.05.27 – 1878.11.30)
- Titular Bishop Gaetano Blandini (1881.05.13 – 1885.02.02)
- Titular Bishop John Rooney (1886.01.29 – 1927.02.26)

In 1925, it was promoted to titular archbishopric of the highest, Metropolitan rank, and its name was shortened to Sergiopolis. As such, it has had the following incumbents, the first two however still only as titular bishop :

- Titular Bishop Hector-Raphaël Quilliet (1928.03.23 – 1928.11.26)
- Titular Bishop François-Marie Kersuzan (1929.02.04 – 1935.07.23)
- Titular Archbishop Adolfo Alejandro Nouel y Boba-Dilla (1935.10.11 – 1937.06.26)
- Titular Archbishop Basile Khoury (1938.10.15 – 1941.11.21)
- Titular Archbishop Natale Gabriele Moriondo, Dominican Order (O.P.) (1943.06.01 – 1946.01.03)
- Titular Archbishop Antonio Taffi (1947.05.14 – 1970.01.06).

== Gallery ==
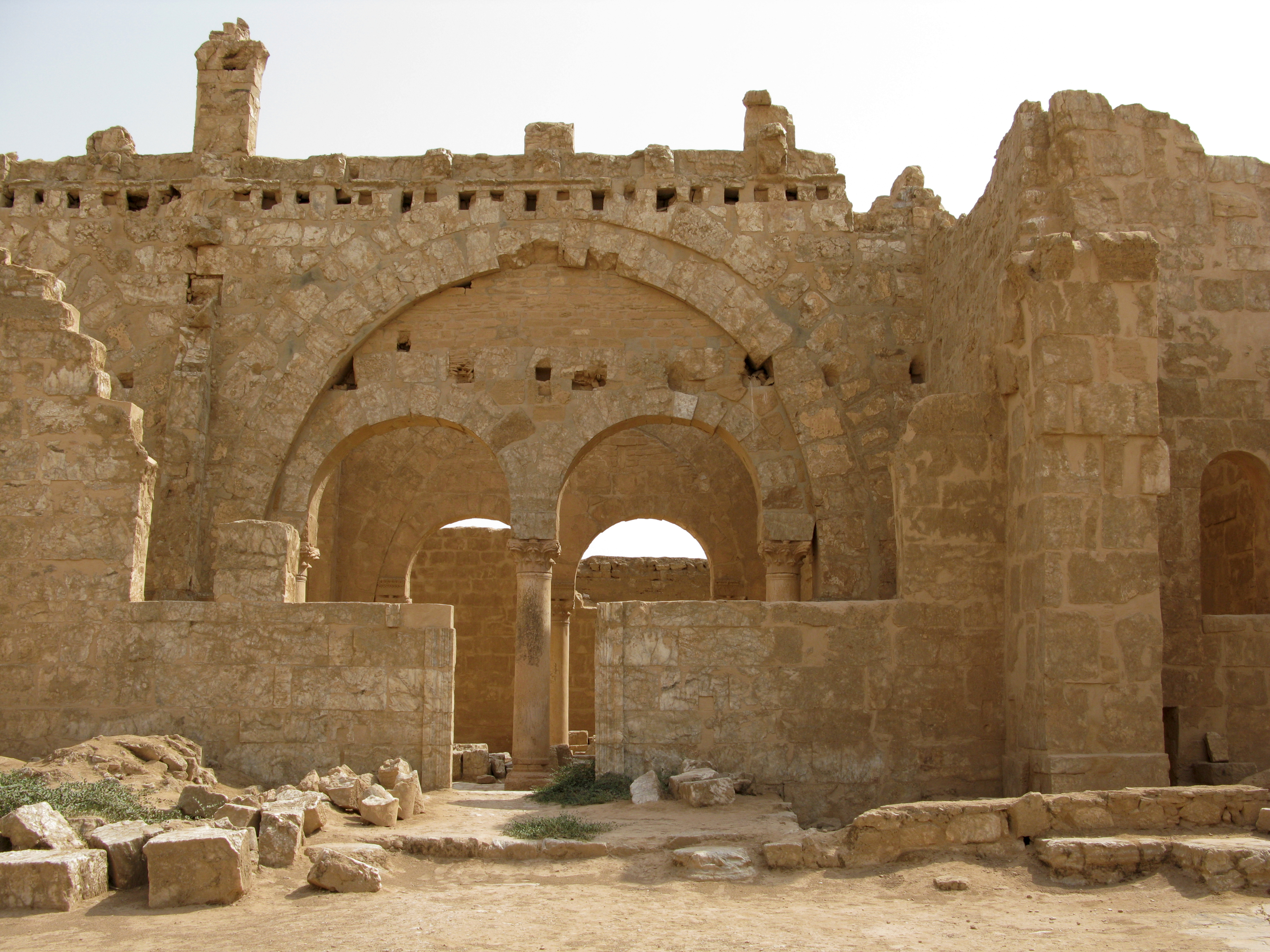
Basilica of St. Sergius

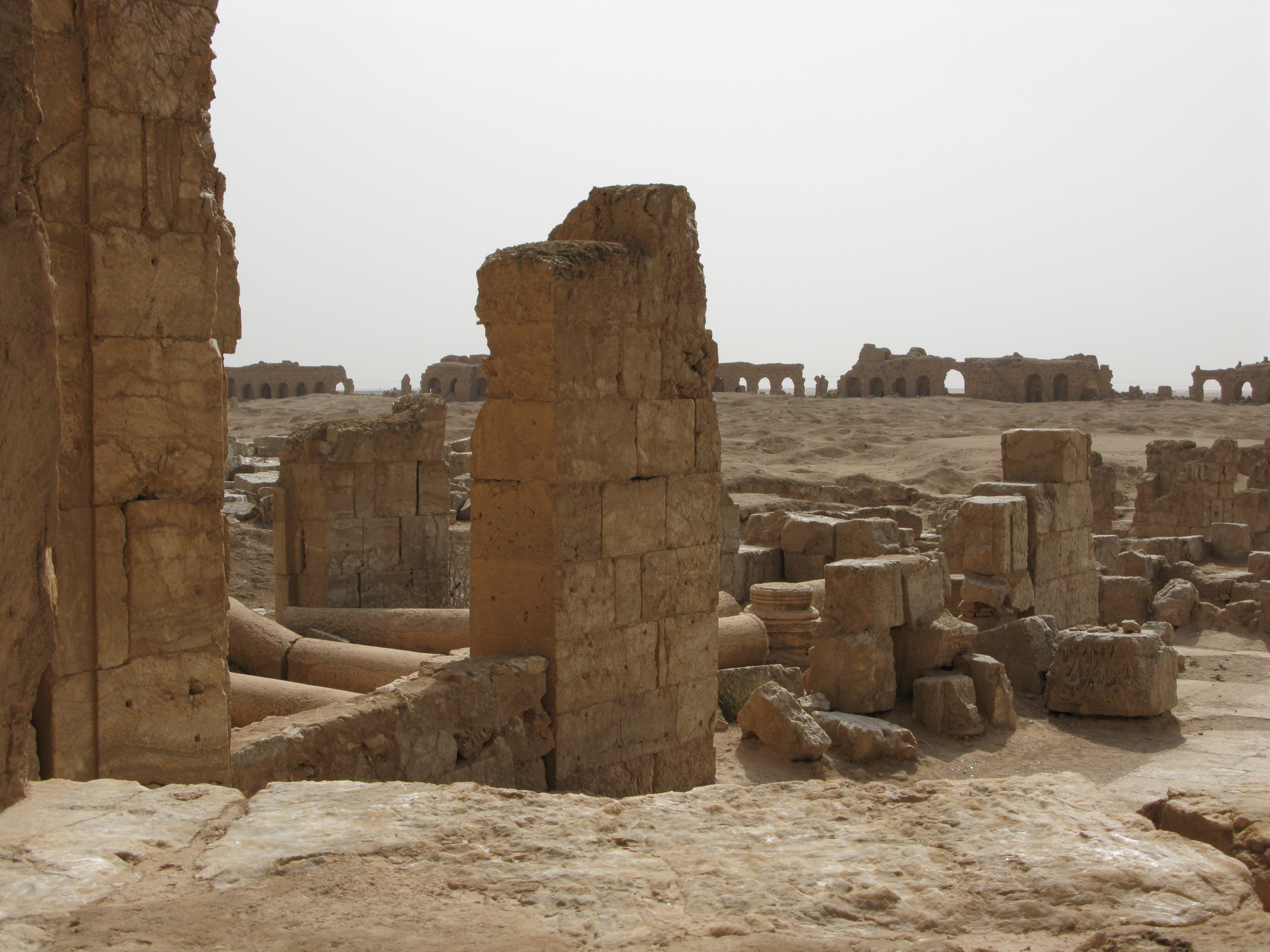
Byzantine columns

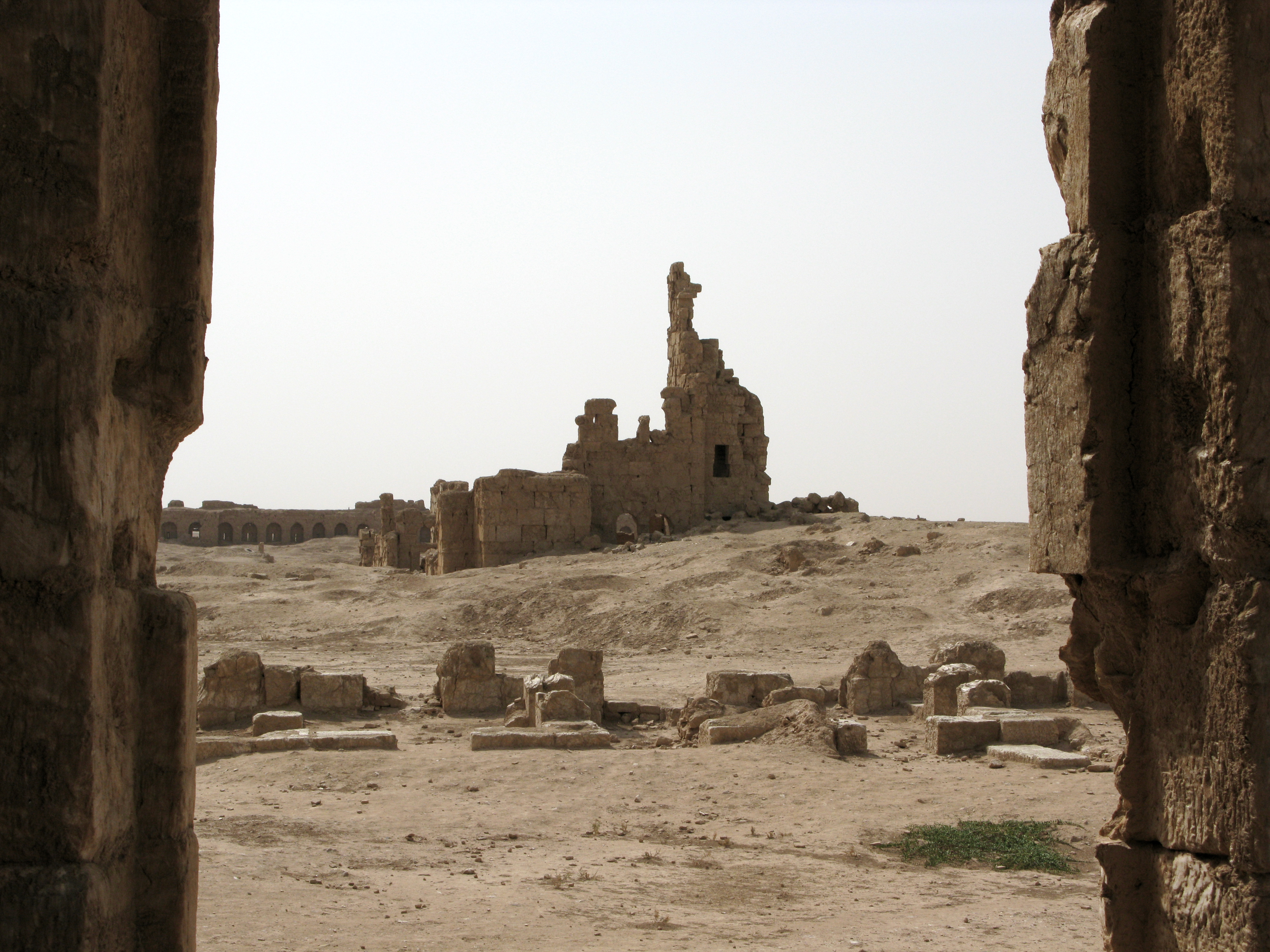
Ruins

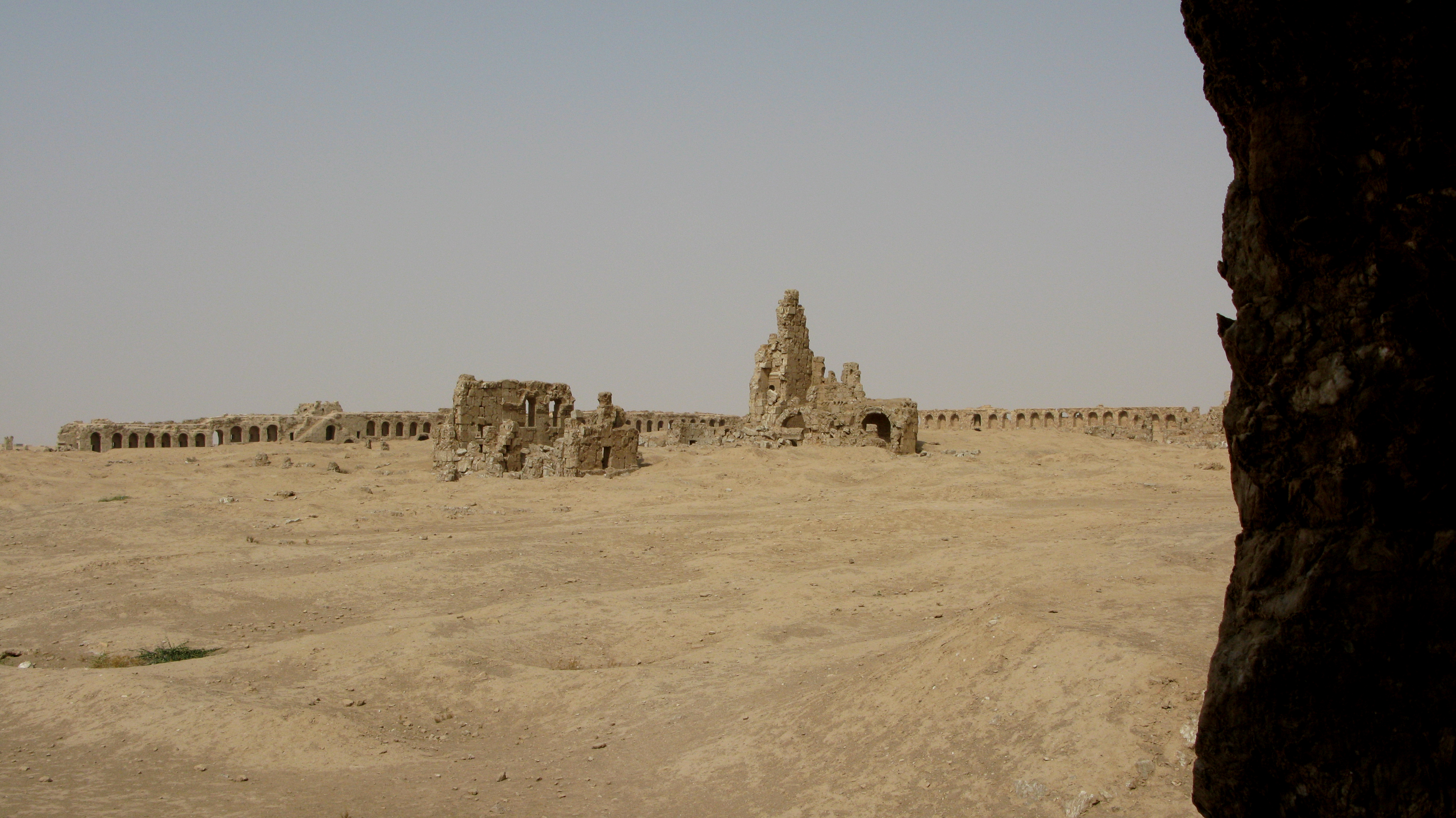
Walled city

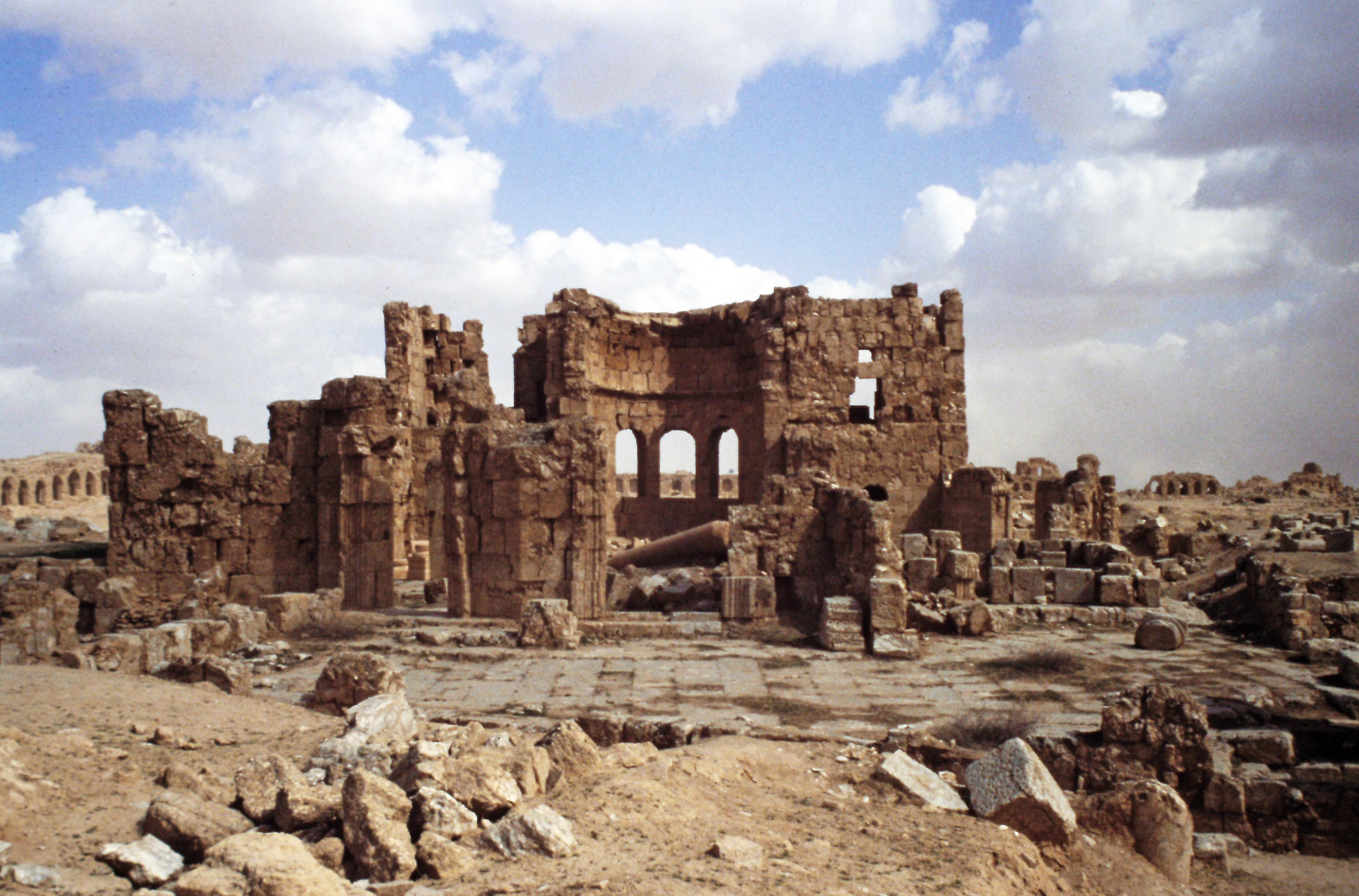
Ruins of Sergiopolis

== Sources and external links ==
- GigaCatholic with titular incumbent biography links
