= Pla del Remei =

Barrio in Valencia, Spain

Coordinates: 39.46903°N 0.36910°W

- Ward of Valencia
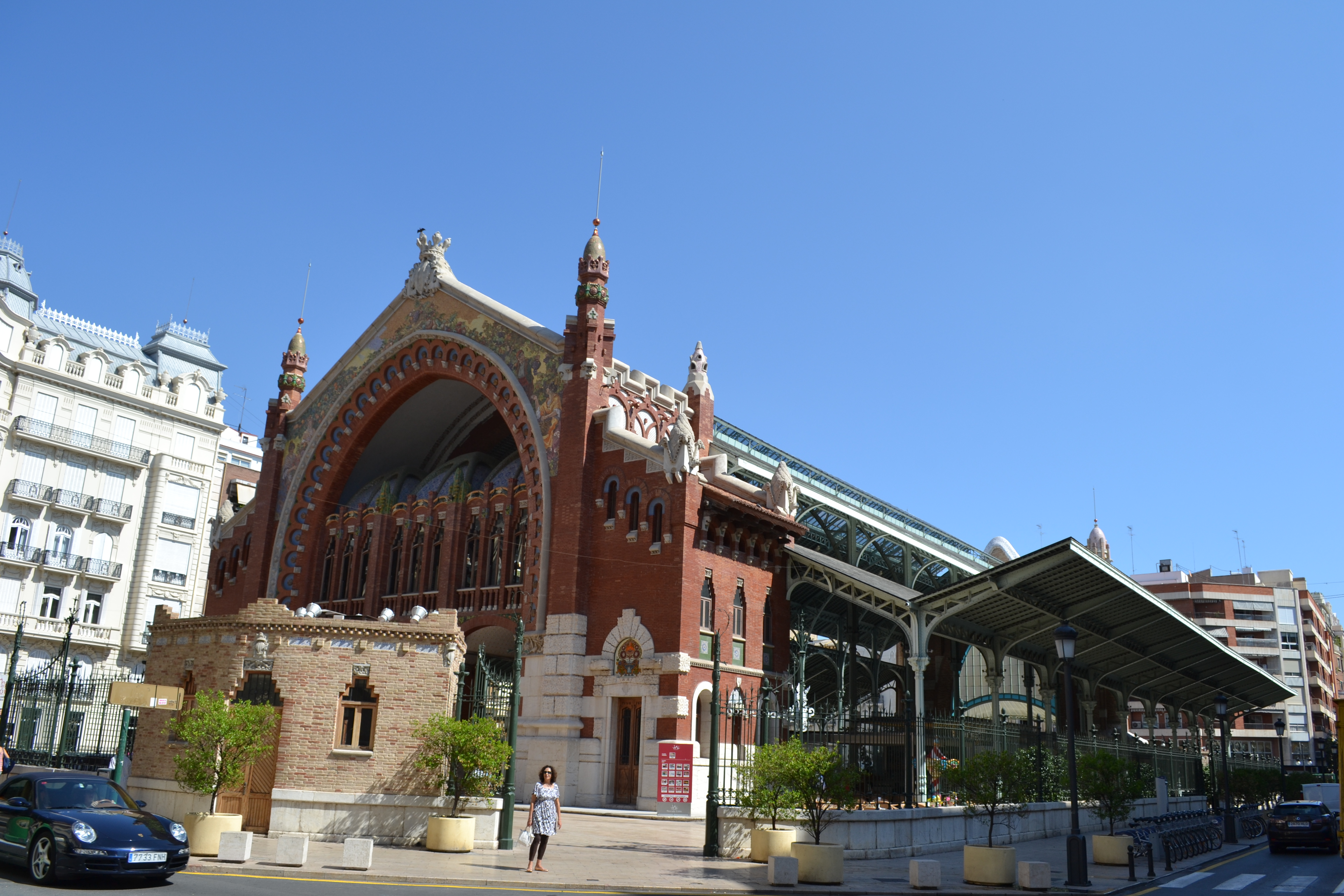
- Mercado de Colón

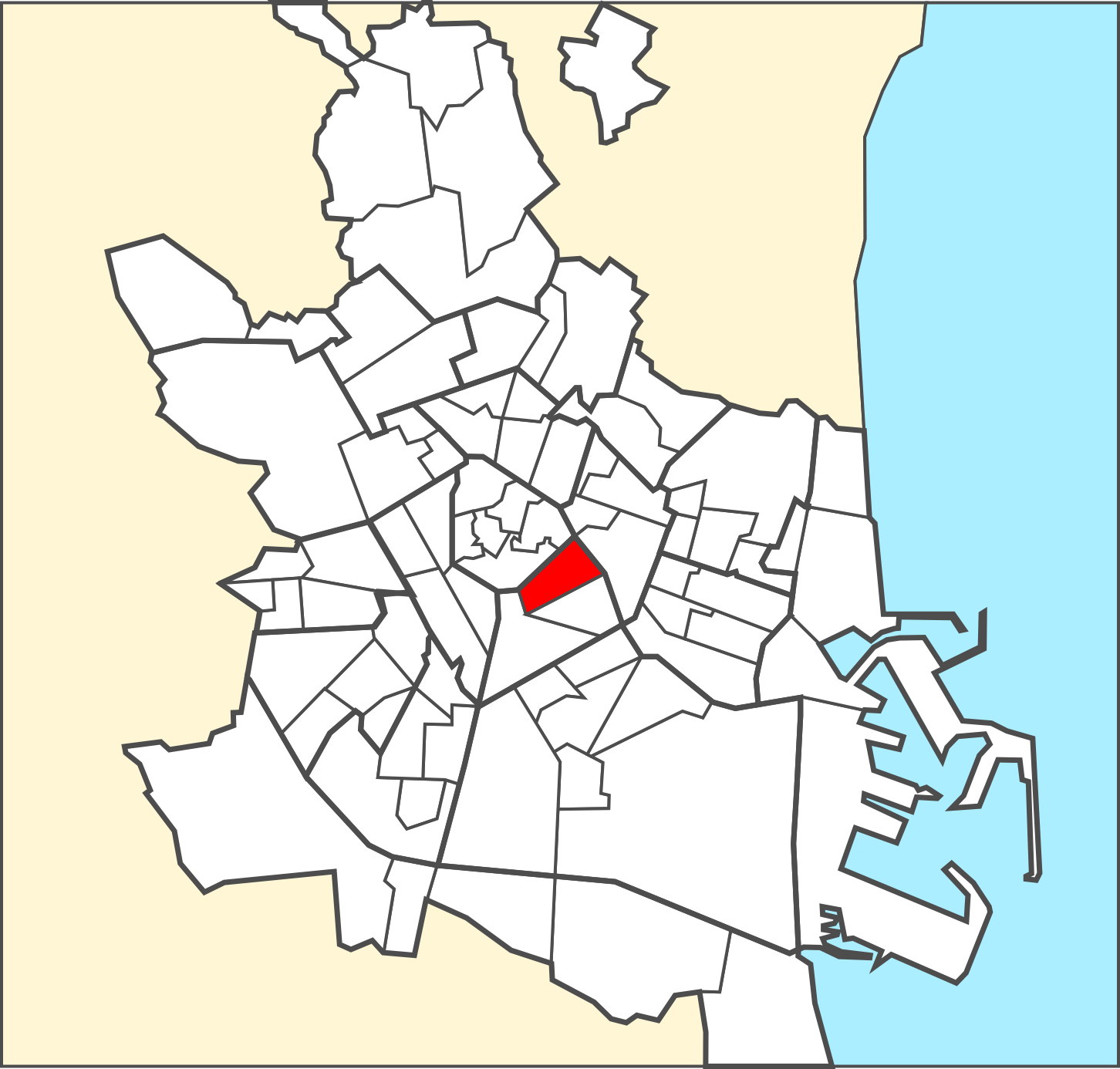
- Country: Spain
- Aut. community: Valencia
- Municipality: Valencia
- District: Eixample

Area
  - Total: 0.387 km^{2} (0.149 sq mi)

Population (2024)
  - Total: 7,240
  - Density: 18,700/km^{2} (48,500/sq mi)

El Pla del Remei is a barrio of Valencia, Spain, in the district of Eixample. As of 2025, it has a population of 7,344 inhabitants.
