= Al-Jarniyah =

Al-Jarniyah الجرنية
- Town
- Location in Syria
- Coordinates: 36.159560°N 38.236989°E
- Country: Syria
- Governorate: Raqqa
- District: al-Tabqah
- Subdistrict: al-Jarniyah
- Control: Autonomous Administration of North and East Syria
- Elevation: 371 m (1,217 ft)

Population (2004 census)
  - Total: 2,686
- Time zone: UTC+3 (AST)

Al-Jarniyah (Arabic: الجرنية), also written Jurneyyeh, is a town in Raqqa Governorate, Syria. It is the administrative centre of Al-Jarniyah subdistrict in Al-Tabqah District. The population of the town at the 2004 census was 2,686.

The town and much of the subdistrict are currently controlled by the Syrian Democratic Forces, following 2 years of ISIL control since 2014.

== Syrian Civil War ==
The ISIL control of the town was ended in December 2016, when SDF forces cut off and cleared a large part of the Al-Jarniyah Subdistrict.

== See also ==
- Raqqa offensive (2016–17)
