= Al-Mansurah Subdistrict, Raqqa =

Al-Mansurah Subdistrict ناحية المنصورة
- Subdistrict
- Location of Mansoura Subdistrict within Raqqa Governorate
- Interactive map of Al-Mansurah Subdistrict
- Coordinates (Al-Mansurah): 35.84°N 38.75°E
- Country: Syria
- Governorate: Raqqa
- District: Tabqa
- Seat: Al-Mansurah

Population (2004)
  - Total: 58,727
- Geocode: SY110301

Al-Mansurah Subdistrict or Al-Mansurah Nahiyah (Arabic: ناحية المنصورة) is a Syrian Nahiyah (Subdistrict) located in Tabqa District in Raqqa Governorate, situated south-west of Raqqa and the Euphrates river. The subdistrict is bounded by the Euphrates river and the small Tabqa Subdistrict to the north and Sabka subdistrict also of Raqqa Governorate to the west. According to Syria's Central Bureau of Statistics (CBS), Al-Mansurah Subdistrict had a population of 58,727 in the 2004 census.

During the Syrian civil war, the subdistrict, including its administrative centre Al-Mansurah, were controlled by ISIS for three years, before coming under the control of the Syrian Democratic Forces. Then in January 2026, the Syrian transitional government launched the 2026 northeastern Syria offensive and the subdistrict became under its control.
