= Battle of Tabqa Airbase =

2014 battle for the al-Tabqa Airbase during the Syrian Civil War

- Part of the 2014 Eastern Syria offensive and the Syrian Civil War
Date	10–28 August 2014 (2 weeks and 4 days)
Location	Tabqa, Raqqa Governorate, Syria 35.8367°N 38.5481°E
Result	ISIL victory: Base captured by ISIL

Belligerents
Islamic State	(Syria) Syrian Arab Republic

Commanders and leaders
Abu Bakr al-Baghdadi (Caliph of ISIL); Abu Ali al-Anbari (ISIL governor of Syria); Abu Omar al-Shishani (chief planner and general supervisor of battle) "The Tajik emir" (Attack leader); Amer al-Rafdan (Attack Co-Leader); Akhmad Shishani (Badr Brigade)	Unknown

Units involved
(Islamic State) Military of ISIL; Al Aqsa Brigade; Badr Brigade; Sabri Brigade; Yarmouk Brigade; Khalid ibn al-Walid Brigade	Syrian Armed Forces; Syrian Army; Army Airmobile Forces; 2 battalions from 93rd Armored Brigade; Syrian Air Force; 12th Attack Squadron; 24th Helicopter Brigade

Strength
≈2,800+	≈1,400+

Casualties and losses
346 killed	(Ba'athist Syria) 500+ killed (300 executed); 10–20 captured One Su-22M3 shot down

The Battle of Tabqa Airbase refers to a series of clashes between the Islamic State (IS) and the Syrian Arab Armed Forces in August 2014, during the Syrian Civil War. Tabqa was the last bastion for Syrian military forces in Raqqa province, which at the end of the battle came fully under the control of the Islamic State.

== Early engagements ==
Around 10 August 2014, ISIL started to continuously attack Tabqa Airbase.

On 17 August, the Syrian Air Force launched 26 airstrikes on ISIL-held Raqqa city and around Tabqa, killing at least 31 ISIL fighters and wounding dozens. At least eight civilians were also killed and ten wounded. At the same time the army launched an equal number of airstrikes in Deir Ez-zor against ISIL positions, bringing the total number of airstrikes to 40. The following day the Syrian Air Force launched another 20 airstrikes against ISIS positions, one of which destroyed the Raqqa city water plant, cutting off water supply to the city. According to Al Rai reporter Elijah J. Magnier, the Syrian Air Force used guided missiles following U.S. intel on ISIS gatherings. According to an anonymous source, the U.S. and an unidentified Western country provided the Syrian military with lists of ISIS targets acquired through drone intelligence.

Meanwhile, the Syrian army sent reinforcements to Tabqa Airbase, and strengthened fortifications inside the base. It also supplied its garrison with large quantities of ammunition and food.

== Ramped-up fights ==
On the night of 19 August the heaviest fighting yet occurred at Tabqa air base, which involved medium and heavy weaponry as well as 15 government air raids around Tabqa. ISIL had captured a string of nearby villages in the days before the attack, tightening its siege on the base. The assault started with a double suicide bombing near the entrance to the base, followed by a large-scale ground assault that consisted of 200 fighters, half of whom were foreigners. The next morning, fighting subsided after the first assault wave failed to breach the base, but a second wave was launched in the afternoon. ISIL fighters encountered a minefield, heavy shelling and air strikes throughout the assaults. The mines were reportedly planted as part of an ambush set up by Syrian army Special Forces based on previous observation of ISIS troop movements in the area. The fighting for the base continued until the morning of 22 August, as ISIS managed to capture the al-Tayyara checkpoint near the air base, but failed to break into the base itself. The base was reinforced with additional troops by plane overnight while there were still clashes.

The SOHR reported that no more than 70 ISIS fighters were killed in the previous two days, since the attack on the base started, and denied other reported death tolls. According to the Beirut-based Al-Mayadeen TV, over 150 ISIS fighters were killed in the ambush near the base, while the Al Masdar news site reported more than 200 ISIS fighters being killed in the previous two days, including the ISIS field commander Umar Abdel-Rahman, a Tunisian. According to Al Masdar, 14 soldiers were killed and 29 others wounded between 18 and 22 August.

On the evening of 22 August and following arrival of reinforcements, ISIL launched a third attempt to breach the base, starting with a suicide bombing against the airport gate. The attack was repelled, while airstrikes also hit ISIS positions in the nearby city of Tabqa. According to Al-Masdar, a Syrian army brigade later captured the M-42 highway leading to the city of Salamiyah in Hama Governorate and ended the ISIS siege on the Tabqa air base.

== Retreat and collapse ==
On 24 August, ISIS fighters breached Tabqa and took control over large parts of the air base. This attack occurred when the army was already retreating from the base to the Ithriya area, leaving a small garrison behind. The base was eventually captured that day. According to Elijah J. Magnier, ISIS militants destroyed a MiG-21 fighter jet, while 15 other MiG-21s and all helicopters were evacuated from the base. The SOHR also confirmed all military aircraft were evacuated from the base during the retreat, while according to Charles Lister (Brookings Doha Center) ISIS captured a number of MiG-21B's, SA-16 MANPADS and Atoll missiles in the base, but noted that it was unclear whether the MiG-21Bs were at all operational.

In the final assault, 170 soldiers were killed, while since the start of the battle, 346 ISIS fighters and 195 soldiers had been killed. The number of dead soldiers was later updated to 200. Another 150 soldiers were reportedly captured, while 700 soldiers managed to retreat.

== Post-battle engagements ==
The next day, jet fighters launched seven airstrikes on the surroundings of the air base. According to the SOHR, ISIS captured the al-Ajrawi farm nearby. It also reported that the ISIS prevented vehicles entering and leaving Raqqa province for fear of Syrian soldiers being transported out of the province. On 27 August ISIS captured more than 20 soldiers in the farmlands of Tabqa, while 27 soldiers and eight ISIS fighters were killed in fighting at the Athraya checkpoint in eastern Hama countryside. 60 soldiers who were hiding near the Athraya area managed to reach Salamiyah.

On 28 August, Syrian fighter jets launched a precise attack on an IS HQ in the city of Al-Muhasan, during a meeting between military leaders and sharia judges. The attack resulted in the deaths of most leaders inside (numbering six), while others were wounded. Another airstrike occurred the same day against an IS camp near Mansoura Dam, killing and wounding dozens of insurgents.

== War crimes ==
=== Mass execution of POWs ===
According to SOHR, ISIS executed at least 160 Syrian soldiers captured at the air base between 27 and 28 August. Joseph Adams at Syria Direct identified the execution site 300 meters northeast of Ma'amal Al-Qarmeed, approximately 5 km east of Raqqa. Following the executions, Douraid al-Assad, cousin of Bashar al-Assad, demanded the resignation of the Syrian Defence Minister, Fahd Jassem al-Freij.

== See also ==
- Battle of Tabqa
- Tabqa Dam raid
