= Al-Thawrah, Hama Governorate =

Al-Thawrah الثورة
- Village
- Country: Syria
- Governorate: Hama
- District: Al-Suqaylabiyah District
- Subdistrict: Qalaat al-Madiq

Population (2004)
  - Total: 632
- Time zone: UTC+3 (AST)
- City Qrya Pcode: N/A

Al-Thawrah (Arabic: الثورة ath-thawrah, meaning "the revolution") is a Syrian village located in Qalaat al-Madiq Subdistrict in Al-Suqaylabiyah District, Hama. According to the Syria Central Bureau of Statistics (CBS), the village had a population of 632 in the 2004 census.
