= Al-Jarniyah Subdistrict =

Al-Jarniyah Subdistrict ناحية الجرنية
- Subdistrict (Nahiyah)
- Al-Jarniyah Subdistrict within Raqqa Governorate

- Location in Syria
- Coordinates: 36.159560°N 38.236989°E
- Country: Syria
- Governorate: Raqqa Governorate
- District: Al-Tabqah District
- Elevation: 371 m (1,217 ft)

Population (2004 census)
  - Total: 31,786
- Time zone: UTC+3 (AST)

Al-Jarniyah Subdistrict (Arabic: ناحية الجرنية, romanized: nahiyah al-Jarniyah) is a subdistrict of Al-Tabqah District in Raqqa Governorate (Syria), approximately 75 kilometres (47 mi) west of Raqqa. The subdistrict population at the 2004 census was 31,786.

Al-Jarniyah Subdistrict is bounded by Lake Assad to the West and South, Ayn al-Arab District of Aleppo Governorate to the North, and Raqqa District also of Raqqa Governorate to the East.

The administrative centre Al-Jarniyah and much of the subdistrict are currently controlled by SDF, following three years of control by ISIS and other rebel groups.

== Towns and villages ==
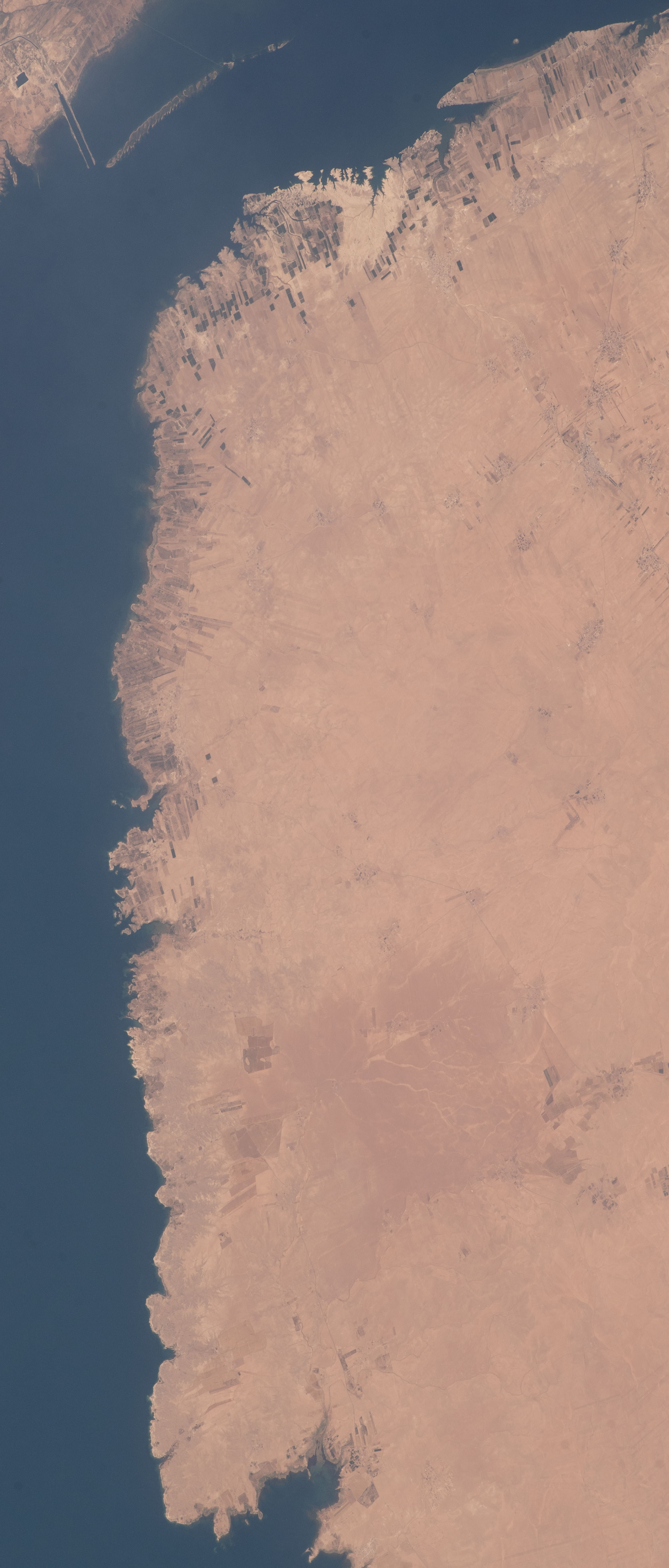
lake shore of Al-Jarniyah Subdistrict, Al-Jarniyah, villages Tawi, Hweijet Halawa, Sharat Duwayrat Rabbah, At Tuwayhinah, agriculture

The towns and villages in Al-Jarniyah Subdistrict and their populations as at the 2004 census were:

- Abu Sakhra (أبو صخرة), 730
- Abu Shamat - Abul Kalat (أبو الشامات_أبو الكالات), 525
- Ajajiyeh (العجاجية), 284
- Badiat Elshoaa (بادية الشوعة), 207
- Bir Elatshaneh (بئر العطشانة), 251
- Bir Elkhozam (بئر الخزام), 391
- Bir Haj Khalif (بئر حاج خليف), 94
- Bir Shallal (بئر شلال), 921
- Bisrawi (بصراوي), 351
- Dahweh (ضحوة), 122
- Dukhan (دخان), 415
- Eastern Jaabar (جعبر شرقي), 1180
- Falah Rabu (فلاح ربو), 2638
- Hamra (الحمرة), 408
- Hazzum (حزوم), 275
- Hurriyeh (الحرية), 810
- Hweijet Halawa (حويجة حلاوة), 1651
- Jeiber (جعيبر), aka Jabar, 277
- Jurneyyeh (الجرنية), 2686
- Kanu (الكنو), 191
- Karawan (الكروان), 600
- Khatuniya Eljerniyah (خاتونية الجرنية), 1852
- Mahmudli (Arabic: المحمودلي, Kurdish: Mahmûdiyê), 2713
- Mjeibnet Elamya (مجيبنة العمياء), 859
- Msheirfet Eljerniyeh (المشيرفة الجرنية), 434
- Mweileh (المويلح), 231
- Nafileh (النفيلة), 554
- Rajm Elhamam (رجم الحمام), 93
- Ramleh (الرملة), 1395
- Safra الصفرة 184
- Sanjar (سنجار), 92
- Shahid Ellah (شهيد الله), 592
- Shams Eldin (شمس الدين), 2213
- Tal Othman (تل عثمان), 2024
- Tawi (طاوي), 1180
- Thaheriya (الظاهرية), 424
- Thlath Khrab (ثلاث خراب), 291
- Wasta (الواسطة), 396
- Western Jaabar (جعبر غربي), 833
- Zarijiyet Shams Eldin (زريجية شمس الدين), 171
- Al-Bahtah (الباهتة), 63
- Al-Rahrahah (الرحراحة), 408
- Al-Sakhni (السخني), 112
- Al-Turkah (الطركة), 822
- Mazyuneh (المزيونة), 333
- Shabhar (شبهر), 129

== Notable places ==
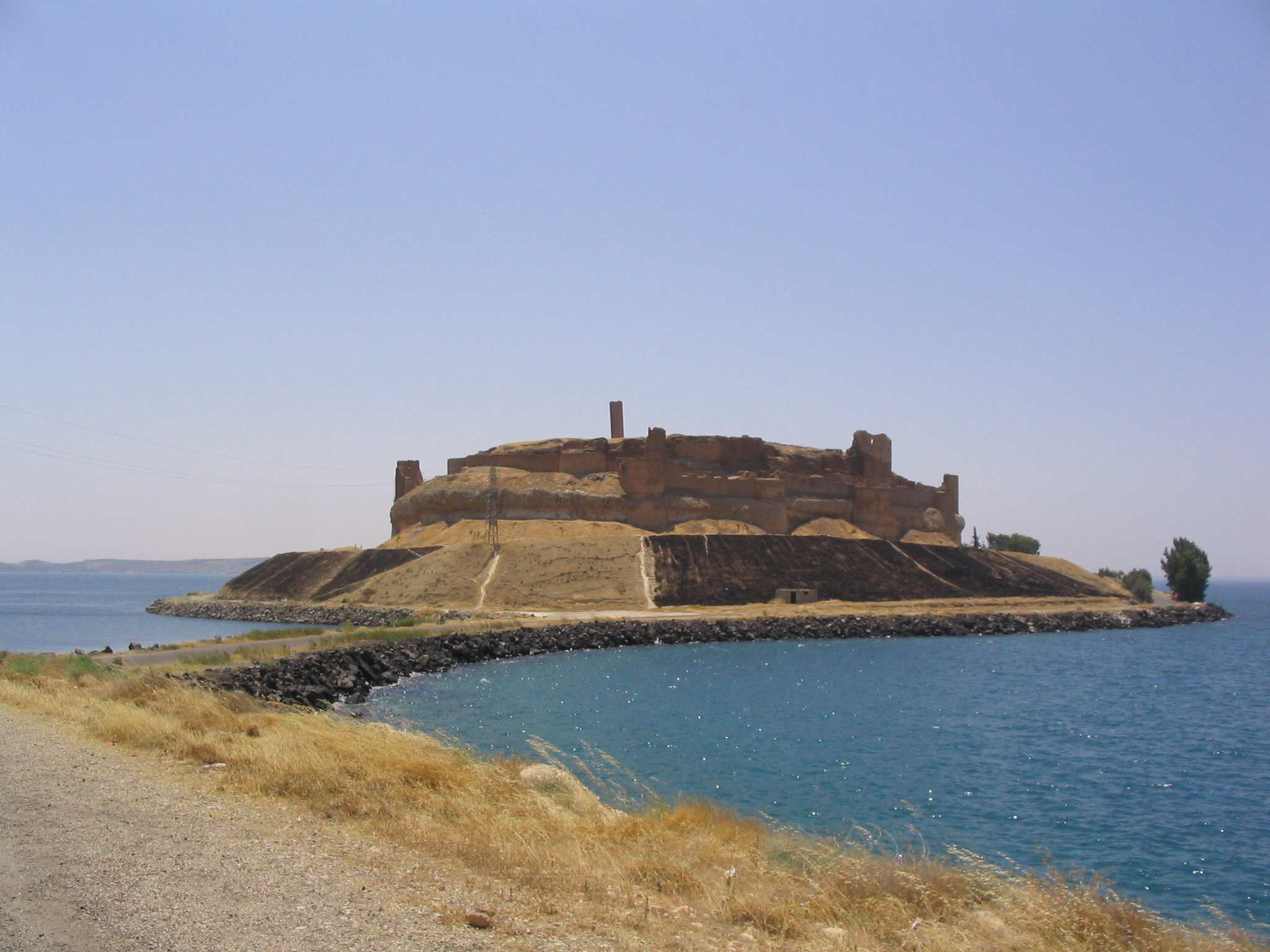
Qal'at Ja'bar from the north, surrounded by the waters of Lake Assad

- The castle of Qal'at Ja'bar, previously overlooking the Euphrates, but now an island in Lake Assad, lies close to Western Jaabar in the south of the subdistrict.

== Syrian civil war ==
By March 2013 Al-Jarniyah Subdistrict, with the rest of Raqqa countryside, had fallen into rebel hands.

During December 2016 the Syrian Democratic Forces drove ISIS out of most Al-Jarniyah Subdistrict. With the help of US special forces, Bir Shallal and nearby villages in the north-east of the nahiyah were taken over in mid December, soon followed by a corridor stretching to Wasta on Lake Assad which cut off the west of the nahiyah which was subsequently taken over. The largest town of the area, Mahmudli in the south west of the nahiyah, was taken over by the SDF at the start of 2017.
