= Eixample, Valencia =

Eixample l'Eixample
- District of Valencia
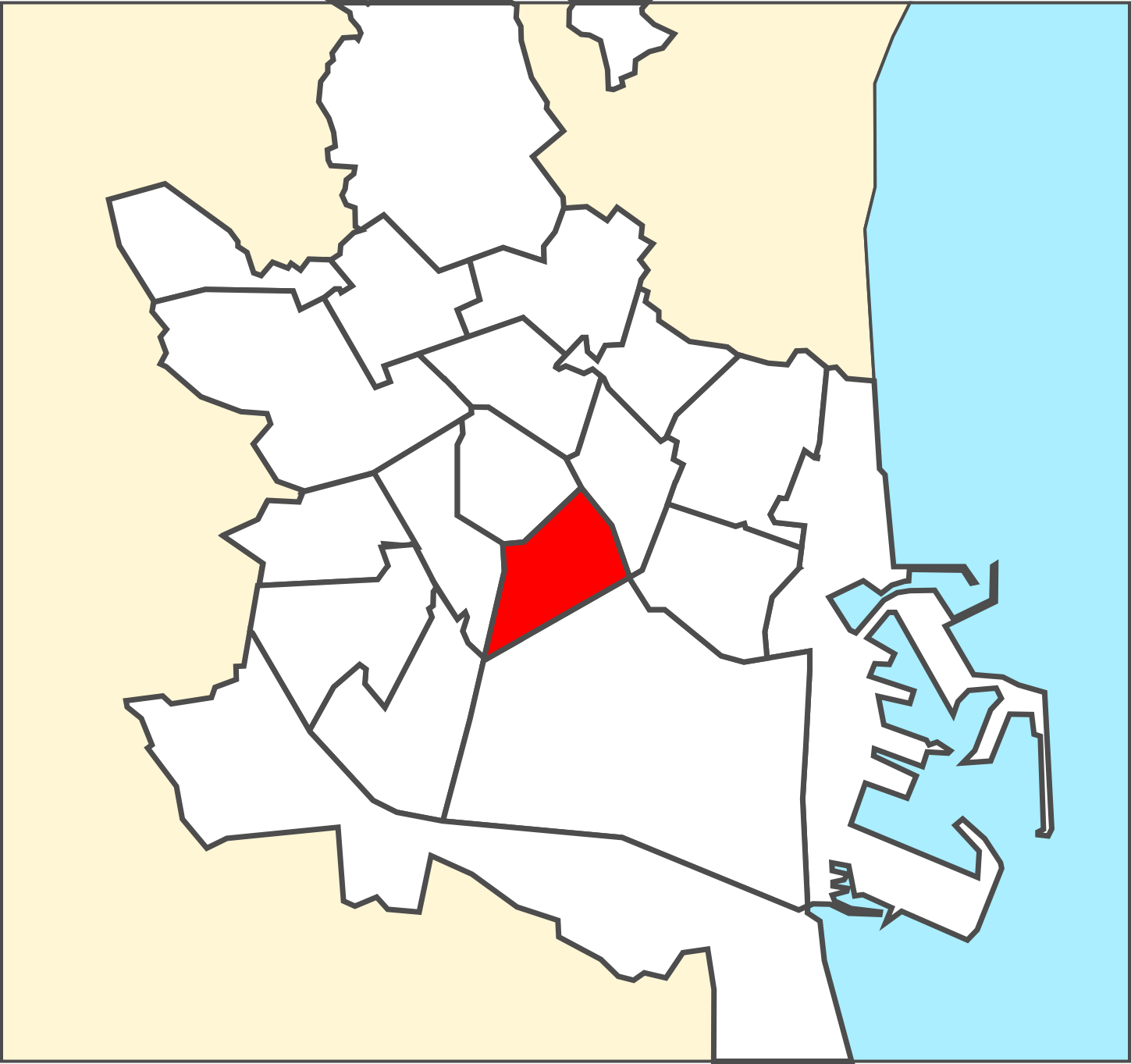
- Location of the Eixample within Valencia
- Interactive map of Eixample
- Coordinates: 39°27′53″N 0°22′12″W
- Country: Spain
- Autonomous community: Valencian Community
- Province: Valencia
- Comarca: Comarca de València
- Municipality: Valencia
- Neighbourhoods: List: Pla del Remei; Gran Via; Russafa

Area
  - Total: 1.733 km^{2} (0.669 sq mi)

Population (2024)
  - Total: 44,631
  - Density: 25,750/km^{2} (66,700/sq mi)

The Eixample (Valencian: [ejˈʃample]) or Ensanche (Spanish: [enˈsaɲtʃe]) is a district of Valencia, Spain between the Old City (Ciutat Vella), Quatre Carreres, Camins al Grau, Extramurs and El Pla del Real. This area takes in the city's most popular shopping street on carrer Colón, Marqués del Túria Avenue and Russafa. It is also the most important commercial area, where popular department stores and shops are located. Moreover, it is very close to important points like the Colón Market, the City Hall, Pau street, etc. It also has excellent public transport communication.

== Architecture and design ==
The Eixample is characterised by long straight streets, a strict grid pattern crossed by wide avenues, and square blocks with chamfered corners (named illes in Valencian, manzanas in Spanish).

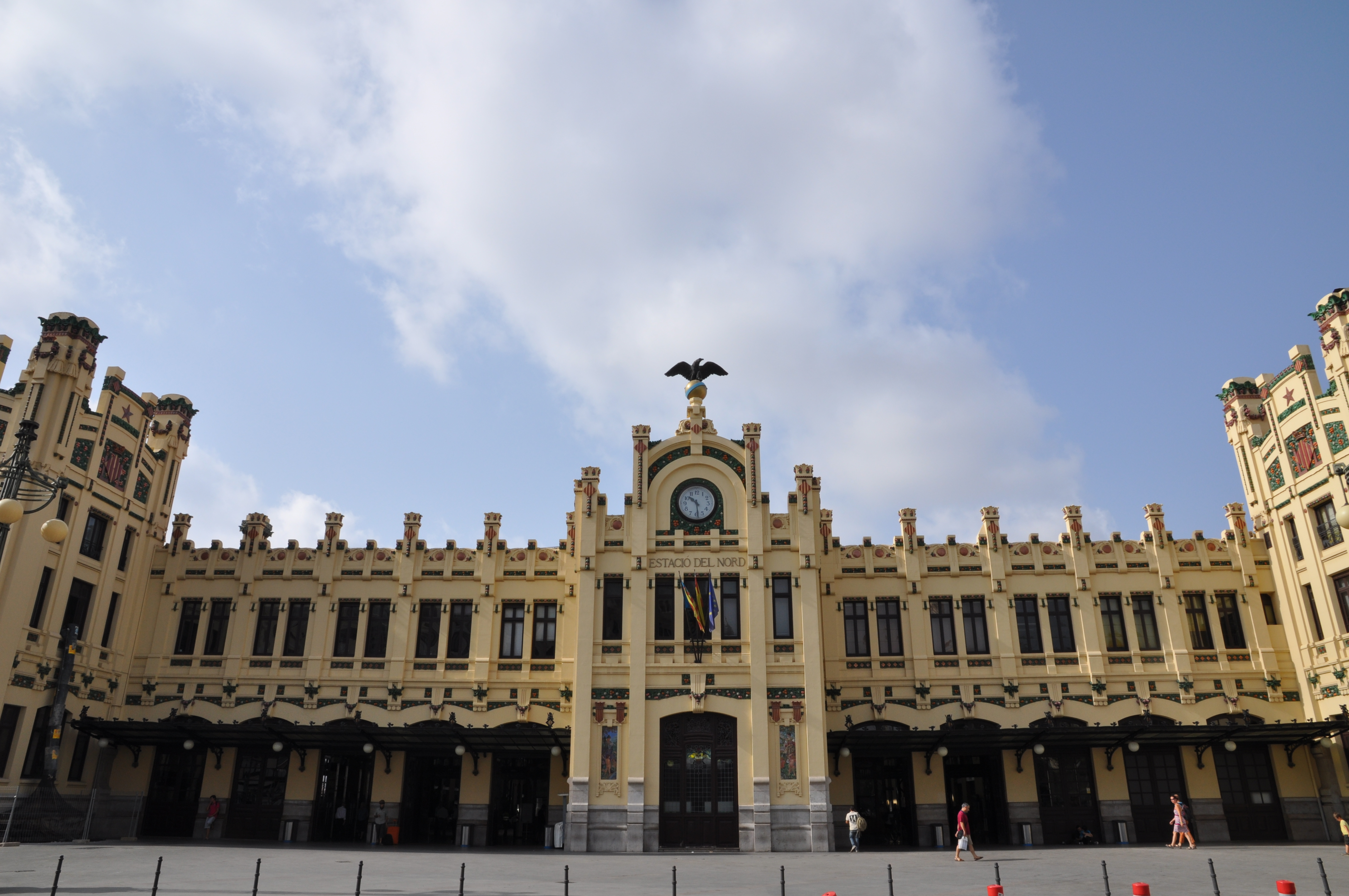
Facade of the North Station

The Bullring has been the centre of Valencia's bull fighting. It was built in 1841. It is a large, impressive structure in the style of a Roman Coliseum but employing Doric ornament. With only the ring itself measuring 52 m in diameter, it is much larger as a whole, with 4 levels of colonnades and balustrades. Access to the interior is via the Bullfighting Museum only. When there are no bull-fights the bullring hosts an occasional fair, concert or circus, and closes the rest of the time. The North Station (Valencian: Estació del Nord, Spanish: Estación del Norte) is the main railway station, 200m from the town hall and has connections with Metrovalencia lines 3 and 5, and the city bus network. It was built in 1917 with Neo-Gothic influence in the structure, it hosts an entire kaleidoscope of typically Valencian mosaics and ceramics on the themes of Valencian countryside, making it a glimpse into the local culture. It was declared Good of Cultural Heritage in 1987. The main railway station is built in Modernisme (the Spanish version of Art Nouveau) style.

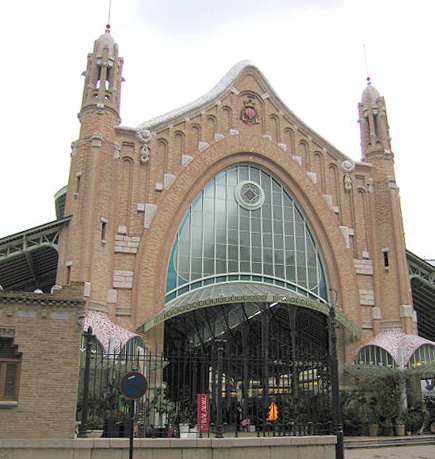
Colón Market

Mercat or Mercado de Colón is a market in Valencia. It features an open structure with high nave architecture and ceramic decorations depicting Valencian country life. Built in 1914, the market contains souvenir shops and cafes, and hosts regular concerts.

== Neighbourhoods ==
There are three administrative neighborhoods:

- Pla del Remei

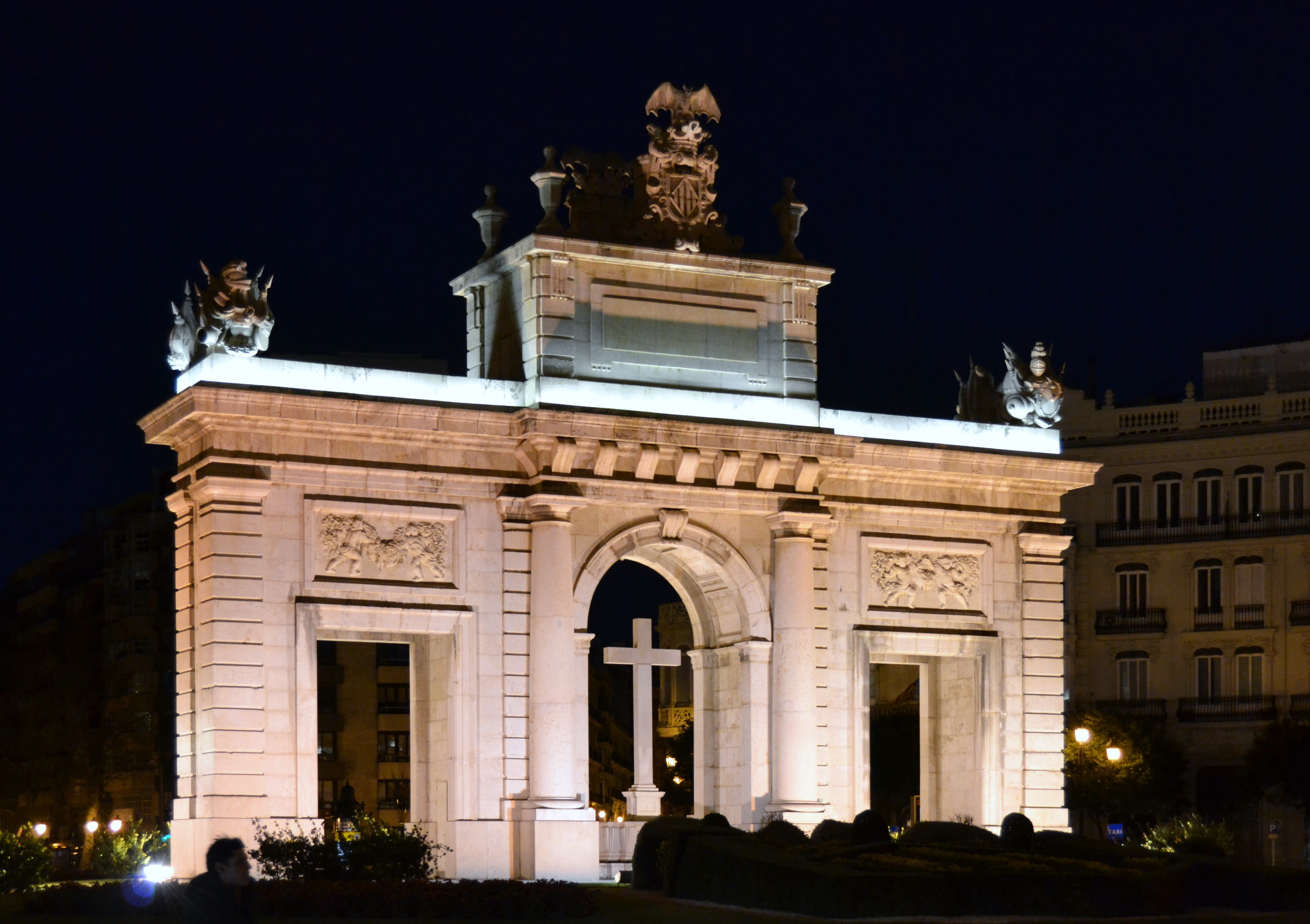
Porta de la Mar

Pla del Remei is a popular area to live in Valencia and a luxury location. Its proximity to the administrative centre of the city (the Town Hall), the Túria river and Colón. Colón is one of the main streets in the city centre. It is also the most important commercial area, where popular department stores and shops are located. Moreover, it is very close to important points like the Mercado de Colón, Pau street, etc. The Porta de la Mar square is a vital point in the Centre of Valencia. It is located between the River Túria and the La Glorieta gardens, near the Carrer Colón and very close to the Carrer de la Pau (Calle de la Paz)

- Gran Via

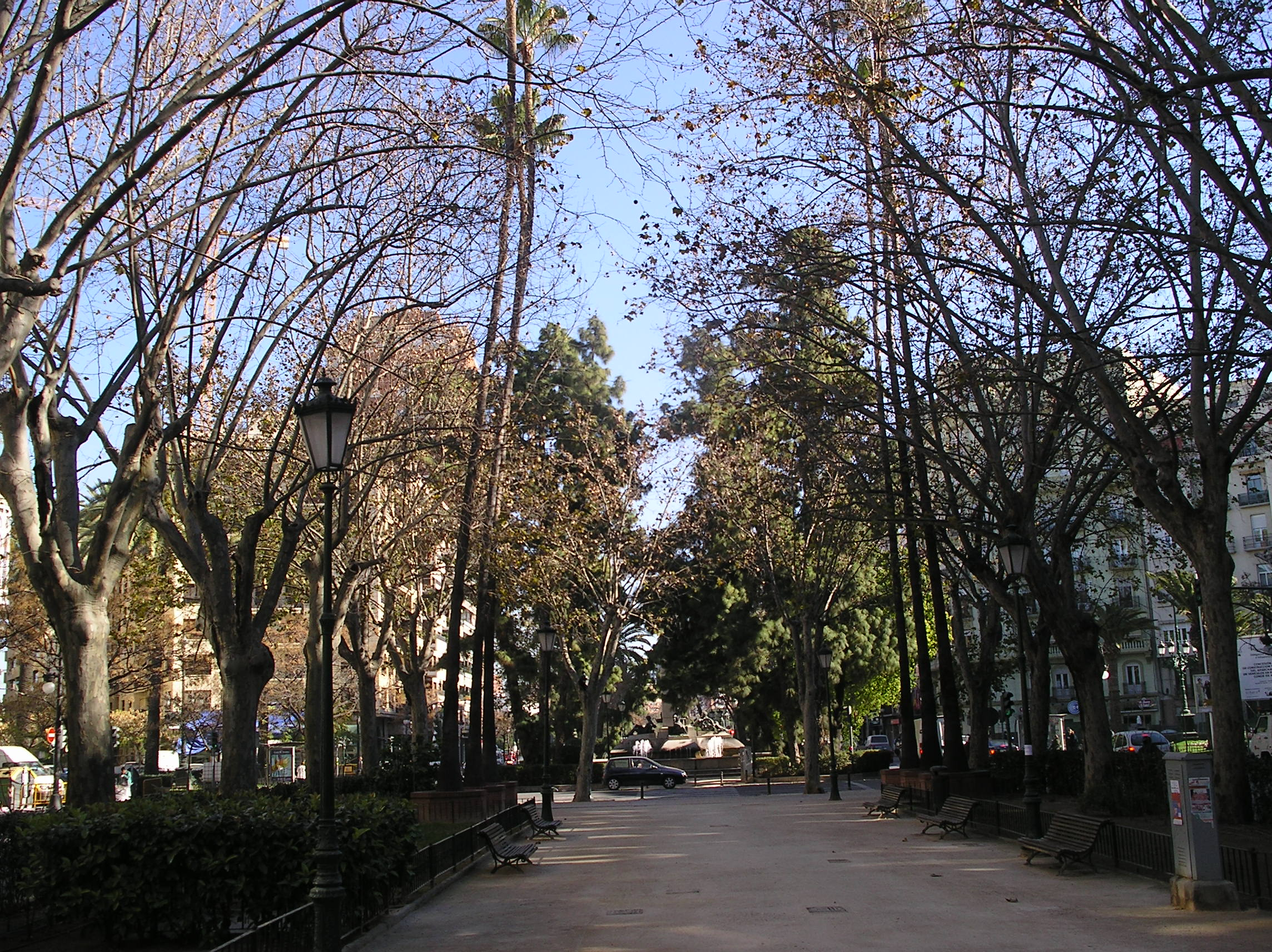
Gran Via Marqués del Túria

Gan Via Marqués del Túria is the most expensive residential area of Valencia. It is placed in the very centre of the city and offers numerous shops and services, including schools.

Cánovas is the center for social interactions. That is to say it is preferred by people who are not after the alternative or underground, who, after a week in the office, want to pass a noisy weekend in "normal pop" and surrounded by a general Valencian crowd dressed for the weekend nightlife. Cánovas is a lot more mainstream than Carmen. It is a vibrant and lively area located very close to the centre. It is very compact - most places are located on the main street (Calle Serranos), although there are also a few scattered between Gran Via Marqués del Túria and Avinguda del Regne de València. The main drag to the north of the circular Plaza or Plaça de Cánovas hosts a few vibrant disco-bars where you can dance until 4am with free entry. Salamanca Street to the south of the Plaza has a lower key pub life with international pubs and lounge cocktail bars. Cánovas nightlife offers some of the most typically Valencian places, as well as a more trendy or cosmopolitan selection. A good number of venues will play solely Spanish pop, also known as música española or, more derogatory by those who are too cool for it, "pachanga". It is basically soft happy rock of local origin. This will usually be mixed with the latest (and sometimes by far not so latest) foreign pop and commercial electronic dance that has been in charts. This music will attract a predominantly local public of mixed age.

- Russafa

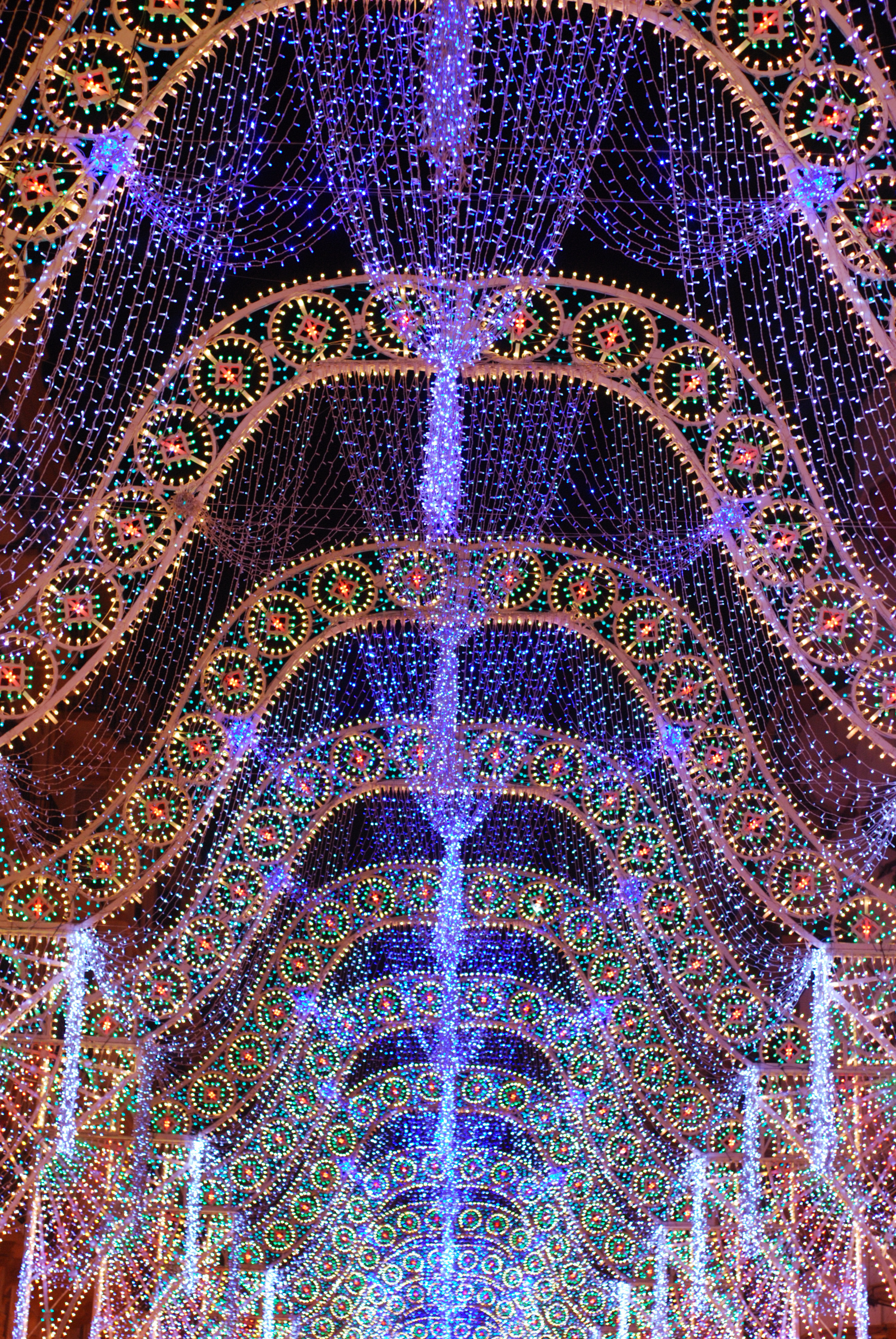
Street lighting in Carrer de Sueca (from junction with Literato Azorín), a small part of Russafa's Falles

An outgrowth settlement springing around a country estate built by order of Andalusi prince Ubayd Allah Abu Marwan (son to Umayyad emir 'Abd ar-Rahman I), Russafa was an independent town until the 1870s and today lies just five minutes outside the historic centre, the Barri del Carme (Ciutat Vella). The word comes from "رُصَّافَة" in the erstwhile native Iberian Arabic dialect, it means "firmly arrayed together" the way gardens are built as concrete enclosures containing plants, framed together. Having undergone a renaissance in recent years, it has become a hotbed of dining, shopping, and cultural activity, especially of the more alternative sort, so the type of people who helped revive El Carme not so long ago are now moving here to escape the tourists. And the resulting mix of young creatives, the older folks who've been here forever, the African immigrants down at the public telephone centres and the Chinese market vendors is one of the great things about the neighbourhood these days. Main church – historically Baroque, since it was built in the 15th century, but fairly restrained for all that - the Parròquia de Sant Valeri (or San Valero), and dubbed the “Cathedral of Russafa.”

Russafa, one of the old parts of the city, is located behind the North Station, and is particularly famous for being a meeting place for the most modern bohemian people. Many of the old houses and palaces have been rebuilt and adapted as bars or pubs, restaurants. Many of this music bars and pubs have the attraction of including live music performances (rock, jazz, blues...). Russafa has overtaken Carmen as the city's hippest area. It is a working-class, ethnically diverse quarter that is being colonised by young creatives – Valencia's version of Brixton and Camden in London. It is full of vintage clothes shops, bike shops, homeware stores which sells work by contemporary Valencian artist, art gallery/wine shop. Restaurants range from traditional tapas and bocadillos to oysters, South American restaurants, and fusion. The park on Plaza Manuel Granero is a green space in Russafa, where kids play in a Wendy house, on swings and slides, or kick a football around, while adults beef up their muscles on the machines in the open-air gym or take a beer in the dappled sunlight outside Bar El Parque.

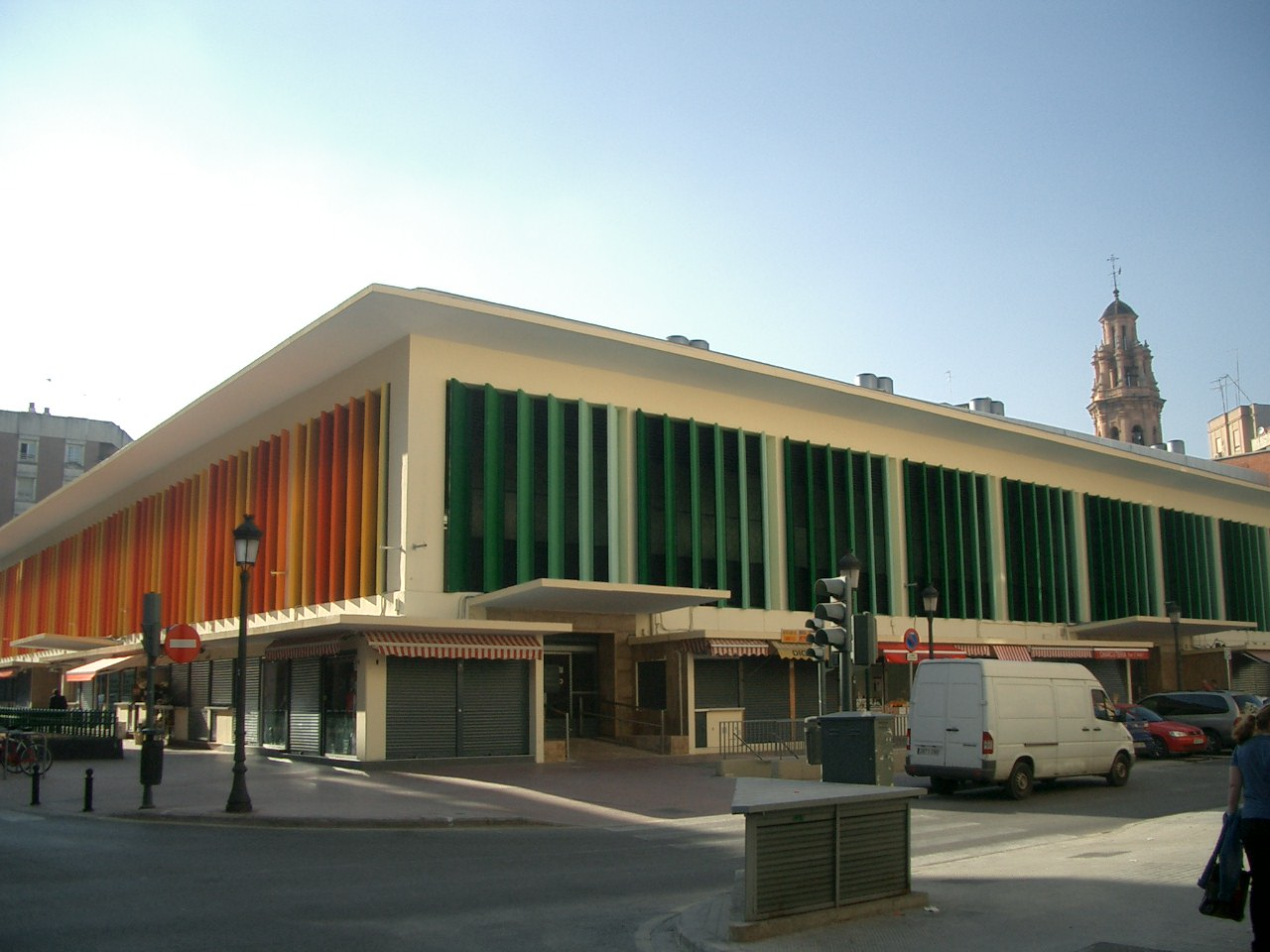
Russafa's Market

Valencia has over 800,000 inhabitants, of which some 25,000 live in Russafa.

The Mercat de Russafa (Russafa's market) is a point of economical and cultural life of this neighborhood.
