= Tabqa =

City in Syria

Tabqa ٱلطَّبْقَة
- City
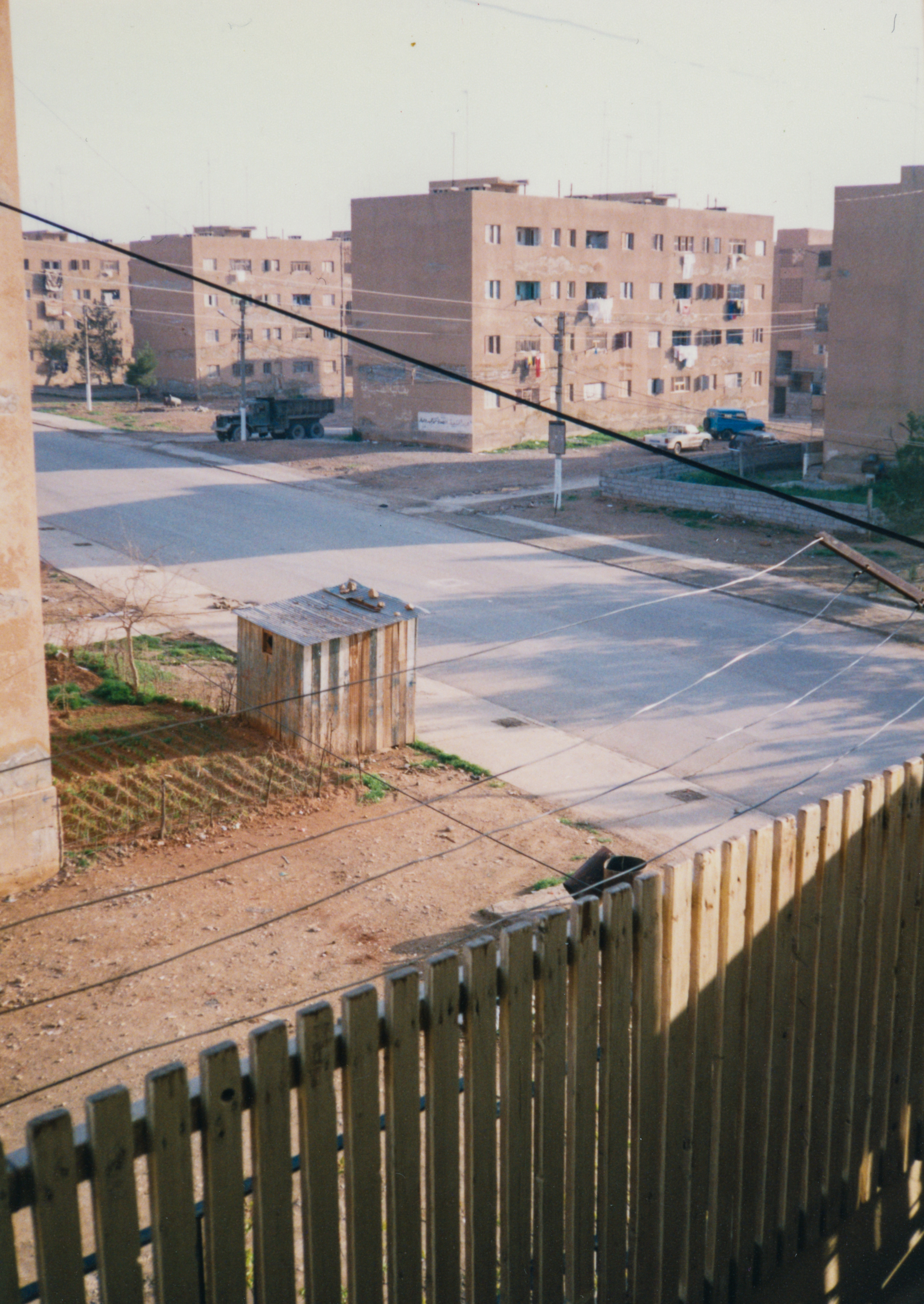
- Tabqa in 1995
- Interactive map of Tabqa
- Location in Syria
- Coordinates: 35°50′12″N 38°32′53″E
- Country: Syria
- Governorate: Raqqa
- District: Tabqa
- Subdistrict: Tabqa
- Elevation: 328 m (1,076 ft)

Population (2004 census)
  - Total: 69,425
- Time zone: UTC+3 (AST)

Tabqa (Arabic: ٱلطَّبْقَة, romanized: aṭ-Ṭabaqah), formerly Al-Thawrah, is a city in Raqqa Governorate, Syria, approximately 55 kilometres (34 mi) west of Raqqa. Until the 1960s it had been a relatively small settlement. The city had a population of 69,425 as of the 2004 census.

== Etymology ==
Since the fall of the Assad regime, the city has officially reverted to its original name, Tabqa. The name literally means "the layer" or "the stratum" in Arabic, and likely refers to the geographic or topographic features of the area, such as stepped terrain or layered rock formations along the Euphrates, where the city and dam are located.

Prior to the fall of the Assad regime and after the 1963 Syrian coup d'état, on 8 March 1967, the city was renamed al-Thawrah (Arabic: ٱلثَّوْرَة, romanized: ad-Ṭhawrah), meaning The Revolution, in honor of the 1963 Syrian coup d'état and the Ba'athist ideological vision.

== History ==
=== Syrian civil war ===
On 26 November 2012, during the Syrian civil war, a main route from Raqqa to Aleppo passing through Tabqa along the Euphrates was dotted with both government and Syrian rebel checkpoints. On 11 February 2013, Syrian opposition rebel groups including the jihadist al-Qaeda-linked al-Nusra Front and Liwa Owais al-Qorani took over the city. On 21 November, there was fierce fighting between government troops and rebels in the town, but by 25 November, the rebels were back in control.

In January 2014, The Islamic State took control of the city. During ISIL rule, the town's Catholic, Antiochian Orthodox Church and Assyrian Church of the East churches were turned into a parking garage, a weapons factory and a barn, with ISIL militants destroying all Christian symbols on the three churches. The Shia Al Zahraa' Mosque was destroyed and an Ismaili place of worship was turned into a children's training centre. In addition, high ranking IS members would reside in the city, to escape the bombardments on its capital Raqqa.

On 22 March 2017, the Syrian Democratic Forces began the Battle of Tabqa to retake the city, as the international coalition assisted by conducting airstrikes. SOHR reported that the airstrikes killed or injured more than 40 people, while the BBC reported 27 killed and 40 wounded. On May 10, 2017, the SDF successfully recaptured the city, during which an estimated 40% of the buildings were either damaged or destroyed.

In early January 2026, the Syrian transitional government launched the 2026 northeastern Syria offensive to take control of territories under the control of the Syrian Democratic Forces (SDF). In the early morning of 18 January 2026, the Syrian Armed Forces announced the capture of the city from the SDF, who had held the city since 2017.

== Demographics ==
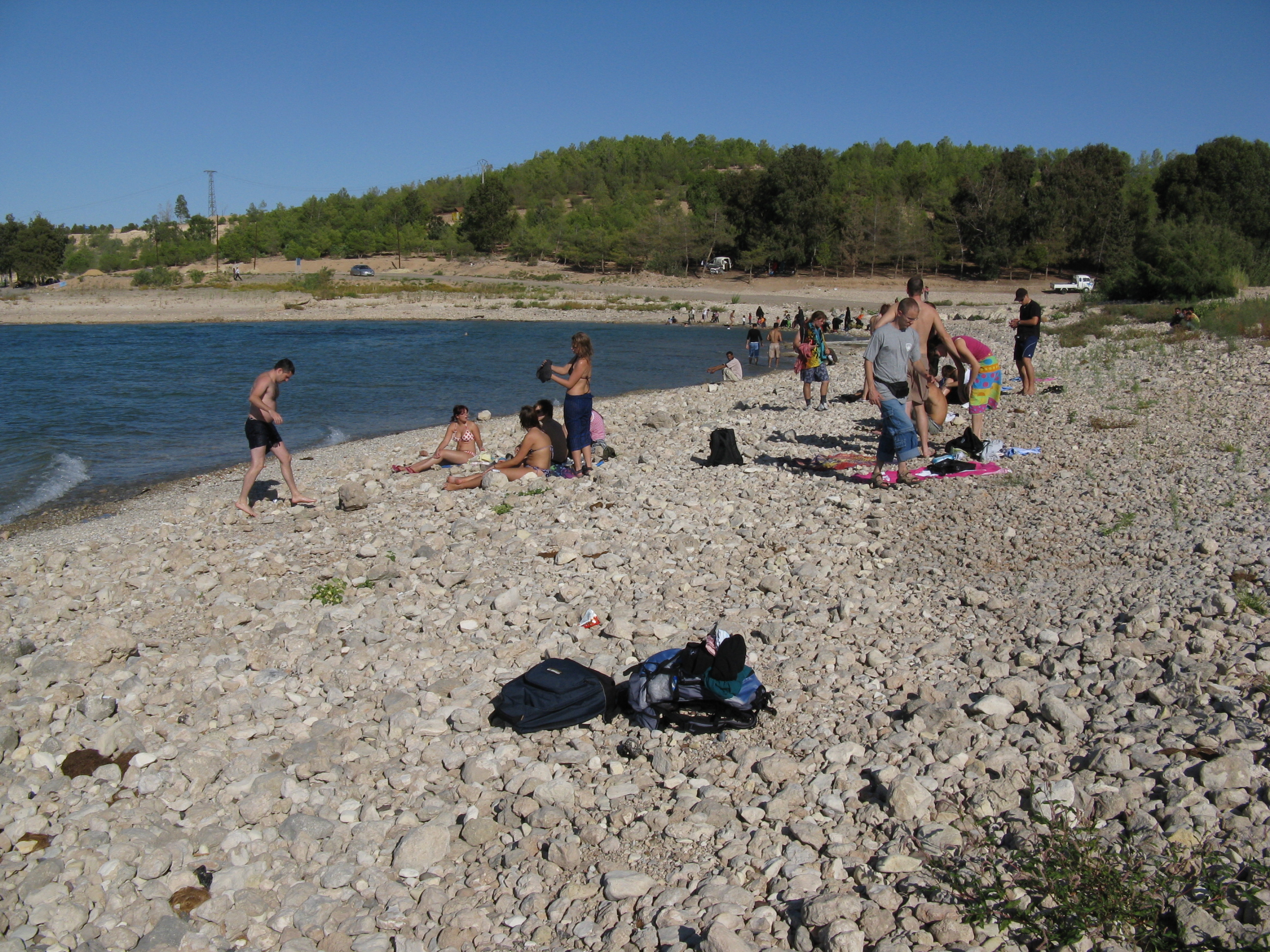
Euphrates Lake beach.

Prior to the Syrian civil war, the majority of the city's inhabitants were Sunni Arabs, with Kurdish, Armenian, Assyrian as well as Ismaili and Shiite Arab minorities.

The Assyrian minority consisted of around 1,000 people, with about half belonging to the Assyrian Church of the East, originating from the Khabour River villages, and the other half being Syriac Orthodox Christians, along with a few Chaldean Catholic, Syriac Catholic and Protestant families. Since the civil war, the Christian population has been slowly declining.

== Geography ==
Tabqa is the administrative centre of Tabqa Subdistrict and the Tabqa District.

The Tabqa Dam and Euphrates Lake on the Euphrates river, an important energy source for Syria, are near the town.

=== Climate ===
Climate data for Tabqa
| Month | Jan | Feb | Mar | Apr | May | Jun | Jul | Aug | Sep | Oct | Nov | Dec | Year |
|---|---|---|---|---|---|---|---|---|---|---|---|---|---|
| Mean daily maximum °C (°F) | 11.1 (52.0) | 13.8 (56.8) | 18.5 (65.3) | 24.2 (75.6) | 30.3 (86.5) | 35.1 (95.2) | 37.7 (99.9) | 37.7 (99.9) | 34.2 (93.6) | 27.9 (82.2) | 20.0 (68.0) | 12.7 (54.9) | 25.3 (77.5) |
| Daily mean °C (°F) | 6.0 (42.8) | 8.0 (46.4) | 11.9 (53.4) | 16.8 (62.2) | 22.2 (72.0) | 26.6 (79.9) | 29.0 (84.2) | 29.0 (84.2) | 25.4 (77.7) | 19.6 (67.3) | 12.8 (55.0) | 7.5 (45.5) | 17.9 (64.2) |
| Mean daily minimum °C (°F) | 1.0 (33.8) | 2.2 (36.0) | 5.4 (41.7) | 9.4 (48.9) | 14.2 (57.6) | 18.2 (64.8) | 20.4 (68.7) | 20.4 (68.7) | 16.6 (61.9) | 11.3 (52.3) | 5.7 (42.3) | 2.3 (36.1) | 10.6 (51.1) |
| Average precipitation mm (inches) | 37 (1.5) | 24 (0.9) | 34 (1.3) | 25 (1.0) | 15 (0.6) | 0 (0) | 0 (0) | 0 (0) | 1 (0.0) | 10 (0.4) | 18 (0.7) | 32 (1.3) | 196 (7.7) |
Source: Climate-Data.org

== See also ==
- Battle of Tabqa Airbase
- Battle of Tabqa
