= Tabqa Subdistrict =

Tabqa Subdistrict ناحية الطبقة
- Subdistrict
- Location of Tabqa Subdistrict within Raqqa Governorate

- Location in Syria
- Coordinates (Tabqa): 35.84°N 38.55°E
- Country: Syria
- Governorate: Raqqa
- District: Al-Tabqah District
- Seat: Tabqa

Population (2004)
  - Total: 69,425
- Geocode: SY110300

Tabqa Subdistrict or Tabqa Nahiyah (Arabic: ناحية الطبقة) is a Syrian Nahiyah (Subdistrict) located in Tabqa District in Raqqa. According to the Syria Central Bureau of Statistics (CBS), Tabqa Subdistrict had a population of 69,425 in the 2004 census.
