= Tabqa District =

Tabqa District منطقة الطبقة
- District
- Location of Tabqa District within Raqqa Governorate

- Location in Syria
- Coordinates (Tabqa): 35.8367°N 38.5481°E
- Country: Syria
- Governorate: Raqqa
- Seat: Tabqa
- Subdistricts: 3 nawāḥī

Area
  - Total: 5,464.68 km^{2} (2,109.92 sq mi)

Population (2004)
  - Total: 159,840
  - Density: 29.250/km^{2} (75.756/sq mi)
- Geocode: SY1103

Tabqa District (Arabic: منطقة الطبقة, romanized: Manṭiqat Aṯ Ṭabaqah) is a district of the Raqqa Governorate in northern Syria. The administrative centre is the city of Tabqa. At the 2004 census, the district had a population of 159,840.

Subdistricts of Tabqa District

The administrative center of Tabqa Subdistrict shown above is the city of Tabqa.

The administrative center of Al Mansura Subdistrict shown above is the city of Al-Mansurah.

The administrative center of Al-Jarniyah Subdistrict shown above is the city of Al-Jarniyah.

== Sub-districts ==
The district of Tabqa is divided into three subdistricts or nawāḥī (population as of 2004):

- Tabqa Subdistrict (ناحية الطبقة): population 69,425.
- Al-Mansurah Subdistrict (ناحية المنصورة): population 58,727
- Al-Jarniyah Subdistrict (ناحية الجرنية): population 31,786.
