= 2019 Turkish offensive into northeastern Syria =

Operation Peace Spring

Operation Peace Spring
- Part of the Rojava conflict, Turkish involvement in the Syrian Civil War, and the Kurdish–Turkish conflict (2015–present)
- Turkish and Turkish-backed opposition control SDF control For a more detailed, up-to-date, interactive map, see here.
Date	Main combat phase: 9–17 October 2019 (1 week and 1 day); Post-ceasefire operations: 18 October – 25 November 2019 (1 month and 1 week)
Location	Aleppo, Hasakah, and Raqqa governorates, Syria
Result	Turkish and SNA victory: 120-hour (5-day) ceasefire, announced by the US and Turkey on 17 October 2019, was partially rejected by the SDF, later on 22 October 2019, Russia and Turkey signed memorandum of understanding, ceasefire extended by 150 hours, and later made permanent
Territorial changes	Turkish Armed Forces, Syrian National Army and their allies capture an area of 4,820 square kilometres (1,860 sq mi), with 600 settlements, including Ras al-Ayn, Tell Abyad, Manajir, Suluk, Mabrouka and cut the M4 highway.; Syrian Army reinforcements move through Raqqa, Manbij, Al-Tabqah, Kobani, Ayn Issa and Tell Tamer, to be stationed along the Turkish border.; U.S. Armed Forces completely withdraw from Aleppo and Raqqa governorates and partially withdraw from Al-Hasakah Governorate; remain in Deir ez-Zor Governorate of Syria.

Belligerents
Turkey; Syrian Interim Government	Autonomous Administration of North and East Syria; International Freedom Battalion; Syrian Arab Republic (from 13 October 2019)

Commanders and leaders
Hulusi Akar (Minister of National Defence); Gen. Yaşar Güler (Chief of the General Staff); Brig. Gen. İdris Acartürk (7th Commando Brigade Commander); Hakan Fidan (MİT Chief); Maj. Gen. Salim Idris (Minister of Defence); Maj. Gen. Sayf Bulad (Hamza Division Commander); Lt. Abdullah Halawa (Hamza Division Commander); Abu Hatem Shaqra (Leader of Ahrar al-Sharqiya); Abu Hafs Al-Gharbi † (Commander of Ahrar Al-Sharqiyah)	Mazloum Abdi (Commander-in-Chief of Syrian Democratic Forces); Riad Khamis al-Khalaf (Tal Abyad Military Council Commander); Imad Meno (Serê Kaniyê Military Council Commander); Tolhildan Zagros † (HAT commander) (Syria) Maj. Gen. Sharif Ahmed (WIA) (Hasakah Province commander) (Syria) Brig. Gen. Aqil Juma'a (106th Brigade commander) (Syria) Col. Munif Mansour (WIA) (79th Battalion commander)

Units involved
See order of battle	See order of battle

Strength
(Turkey) 15,000; 14,000	Unknown c. 4,000–10,000

Casualties and losses
Per SOHR: 355 killed 11 killed Per Turkey: 251 killed, 760 wounded, 1 missing 12 killed (1 non-combat),^{[a]} 164 wounded	Per SOHR: 445 killed 29 killed Per SDF: 508 killed, 1,547 wounded, 73 captured (Syria) 25 killed Per Turkey: 1,313 killed or captured 1 Humvee captured
- 146 civilians killed in Syria by TAF and SNA and 1 civilian killed in Syria by SDF (per SOHR); 73 civilians killed in Syria by SDF (per Turkey); 522 civilians killed in Syria by Turkey (per SDF); 22 civilians killed in Turkey by SDF shelling (per Turkey); 300,000+ civilians displaced (per SOHR)
- ^{a} Two additional Turkish soldiers were killed in the area of Operation Olive Branch in northwestern Syria, which are counted in the toll provided by some media outlets.

Operation Peace Spring (Turkish: Barış Pınarı Harekâtı) was a joint operation by the Turkish Armed Forces (TAF) and the Syrian National Army (SNA) against the Syrian Democratic Forces (SDF), later involving the Syrian Arab Army (SAA), in northeastern Syria.

On 6 October 2019, the Trump administration ordered American troops to withdraw from northeastern Syria, where the United States had been supporting its Kurdish allies. The military operation began on 9 October 2019 when the Turkish Air Force launched airstrikes on border towns. The conflict resulted in the displacement of over 300,000 people and caused the death of more than 70 civilians in Syria and 20 civilians in Turkey. Human rights violations were also reported. Amnesty International stated that it had gathered evidence of war crimes and other violations committed by Turkey and Turkish-backed Syrian forces who were said to "have displayed a shameful disregard for civilian life, carrying out serious violations and war crimes, including summary killings and unlawful attacks that have killed and injured civilians".

According to Turkish President Recep Tayyip Erdoğan, the operation was intended to expel the SDF—designated as a terrorist organization by Turkey "due to its ties with the Kurdistan Workers Party (PKK)", but considered an ally against ISIL by the Combined Joint Task Force – Operation Inherent Resolve—from the border region as well as to create a 30 km-deep (20 mi) "safe zone" in Northern Syria where some of the 3.6 million Syrian refugees in Turkey would resettle. As the proposed settlement zone was heavily Kurdish demographically, this intention was criticized as an attempt at ethnic cleansing, a criticism rejected by the Turkish government who claimed they intended to "correct" the demographics that it alleged had been changed by the SDF.

The Turkish operation was met with mixed responses from the international community, including condemnations as well as support for the operation for the settlement of refugees in Northern Syria. Although Turkey claimed self-defense, according to international law experts it was an illegal use of force. While originally acknowledging Turkey's "right to defend itself", on 15 October, Russia hardened its position against the operation and deployed troops. Ten European nations and Canada imposed an arms embargo on Turkey, while the U.S. imposed sanctions on Turkish ministries and senior government officials in response to the offensive in Syria. The Assad-led Syrian government initially criticized the SDF for the Turkish offensive, accusing it of separatism and not reconciling with the government, while at the same time also condemning the foreign invasion of Syrian territory. However, a few days later, the SDF reached an agreement with the Syrian government allowing the Syrian Army to enter the SDF-held towns of Manbij and Kobanî in an attempt to defend the towns from the Turkish offensive. Shortly thereafter, Syrian state broadcaster SANA announced that Syrian Army troops had started to deploy to the country's north. Turkey and the SNA launched an offensive to capture Manbij on the same day.

On 17 October 2019, U.S. Vice President Mike Pence announced that the U.S. and Turkey had agreed on a deal in which Turkey would agree to a five-day ceasefire in Syria in return for a complete withdrawal by the SDF from its positions on the Syria-Turkey border. On 22 October 2019, Russian President Vladimir Putin and Turkish President Recep Tayyip Erdoğan reached a deal to extend the ceasefire by 150 additional hours if the SDF would move 30 kilometers away from the border, as well as from Tal Rifaat and Manbij. The terms of the deal also included joint Russian–Turkish patrols 10 kilometers into Syria from the border, except in the city of Qamishli. The new ceasefire started at 12pm local time on 23 October. The captured area remained part of the Turkish occupation of northern Syria.

== Background ==
=== Turkish motives ===
Deaths toll in Turkey provinces north of the Syria–Turkey wall January 2018 – September 2019, before 9 October 2019 offensive.
Region	North of	Turkish Forces	Civilians	PKK members*
Mardin	Syria	7	5	25
Şanlıurfa	Syria	1	0	2
Şırnak	Syria 30% Iraq 70%	26	6	119
*It is not documented if "PKK members" individuals are affiliated with the PKK or SDF/YPG.

Turkey has complained about a supposed presence of PKK-related forces at its southern border since 2012, when the first YPG pockets appeared during the Syrian Civil War. Following the 2014 Siege of Kobanî and the expansion of YPG/SDF forces and administration, Erdoğan's government considered the force a national security threat. The 2013–2015 peace process collapsed in July 2015, resulting in a war between PKK and Turkish forces. Like other regions in southeast Turkey, regions north of the border with Syria have seen numerous PKK-related deaths. According to a Crisis Group death toll analysis based upon Turkey government and Turkish media publications, the border regions north of SDF-controlled areas had 8 Turkey security forces and 5 civilians killed in PKK-related violence in 2018 and 2019 prior to the offensive. The Şırnak region had 26 security forces and 6 civilian deaths over the same period. Crisis Group did not specify if "PKK-related" deaths are linked to Syria's YPG and SDF, or from Turkey or Iraqi PKK.

Recent increase in jobless rate and electoral collaboration of opposition parties lead to significant AKP defeats in the 2019 Istanbul mayoral election, signaling difficulties for the leadership party. Military operations are known to boost nationalism and Turkey executive's popularity. It is also seen as an effective way to break apart opposition alliances, between pro-Kurdish and pro-peace representatives actively criminalized by the government, and other opposition parties who are faced with the dilemma of betraying the informal political alliance in order to showcast popular patriotism. Moreover, another driver for the Turkish operation into Syria is the domestic politics involving the 3.6 million Syrian refugees residing in Turkey—the highest number of refugees hosted by any country—which has led to increasing public dissatisfaction and therefore public support and pressure for intervention. The negative sentiment against refugees among the Turkish electorate allows Erdogan and his AKP to benefit from moving refugees back to Syria. According to CrisisGroup analysis, this political strategy has cost AKP half of its conservative Kurds' supports since 2015.

=== Immediate context rebuff ===
Syrian Democratic Forces remove fortifications that were identified as a concern to Turkey in support of the Northern Syria Buffer Zone agreement in northeast Syria, 29 September 2019.

Turkey and the United States struck a deal in August 2019 after months of Turkish threats to unilaterally invade northern Syria. The United States viewed the Syrian Democratic Forces as one of its key allies in the military intervention against ISIL in Syria, while Turkey viewed the group as an extension of the Kurdistan Workers Party (PKK), which it considers a terrorist group. The agreement established the Northern Syria Buffer Zone, which aimed to reduce tensions by addressing Turkey's security concerns with monitoring and joint patrols, while still allowing the NES to retain control over the areas that it had under its control at that time. The agreement was received favorably by the U.S. and SDF, but Turkey was generally dissatisfied with it. Turkey's dissatisfaction led to numerous Turkish efforts to expand the area covered by the buffer zone, secure Turkish control over parts of it, or relocate millions of refugees into the zone, with all of these efforts failing in the face of firm SDF resistance and American ambivalence.

Despite the official start of U.S.-Turkish ground patrols, the dismantling of SDF fortifications, and the withdrawal of YPG units from parts of the buffer zone, tensions continued to rise as Turkey levied yet more demands on the SDF—all of which the SDF denied, as they felt they had accepted a harsh compromise by permitting Turkish troops to take part in joint patrols with their American counterparts in northern Syria. Turkey's dissatisfaction with the status quo of the agreement grew into open hostility, with the Turkish president openly posing an ultimatum against the SDF. The ultimatum was ignored by the group and Turkey declared its "deadline" to have expired at the start of October that same year.

== Prelude ==
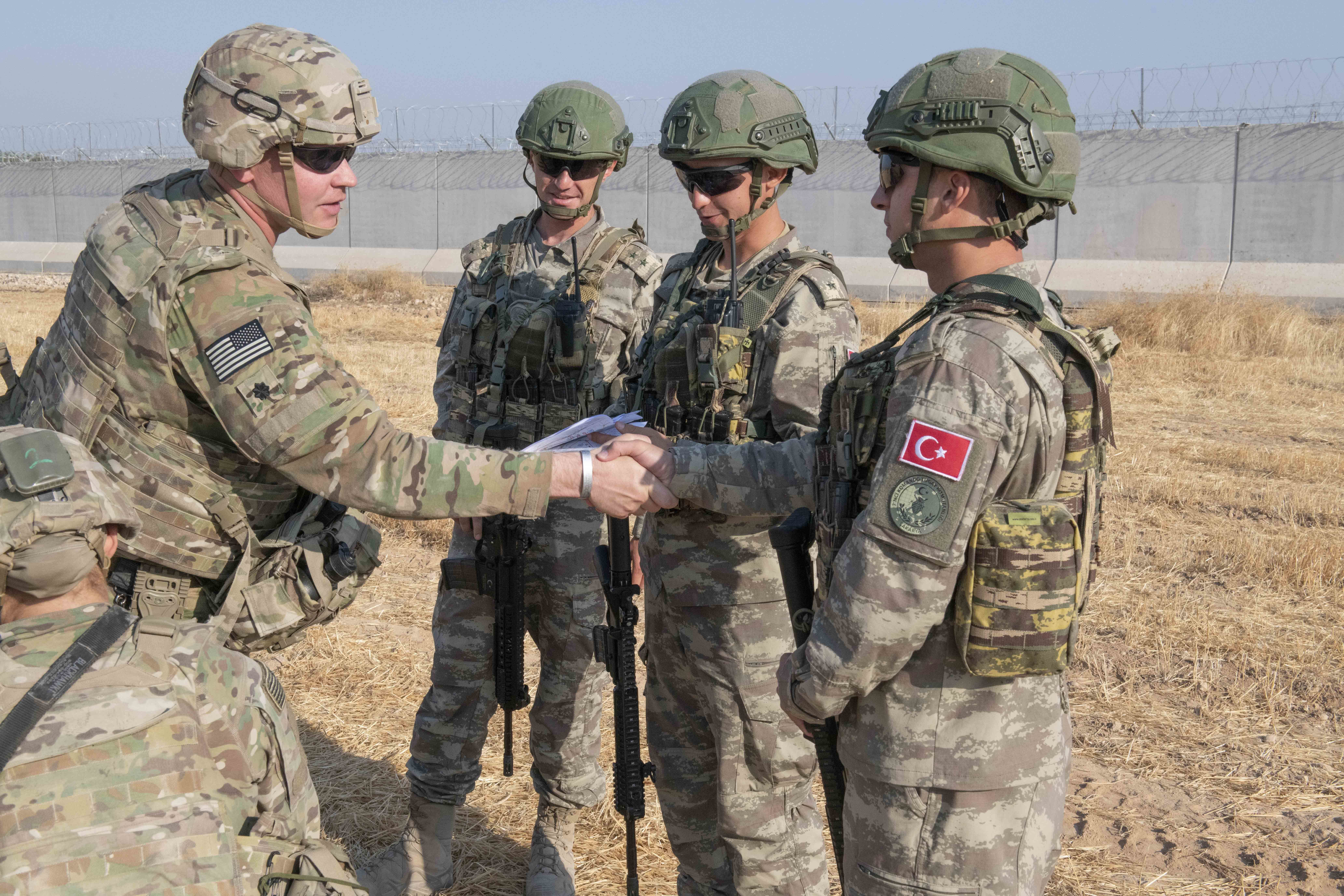
U.S. and Turkish troops rendezvous for a joint patrol in the Northern Syria Buffer Zone, 4 October 2019.

Preparations for the offensive began in July 2019, with the final preparation in October starting with the withdrawal of American forces from positions near the Turkish border. This withdrawal followed a phone call between Turkish President Recep Tayyip Erdoğan and United States President Donald Trump, wherein Erdoğan informed President Trump that Turkey would "soon" be carrying out a planned military offensive into Kurdish-administered northern Syria against SDF-held areas east of the Euphrates river. While the U.S. government stated it did not support the Turkish-led offensive, the White House also announced on 6 October 2019 that it would not interfere, and would withdraw all personnel in the area to avoid a potential U.S.-Turkish standoff; U.S. Secretary of State Mike Pompeo denied that this amounted to giving Turkish forces a "green light" to attack the SDF while a spokesman for the SDF called the U.S. withdrawal a betrayal. The US also reportedly cut off aid to the SDF in order to avoid arming them against a NATO ally.

On 8 October 2019, the Turkish military reportedly bombed a convoy of weapons vehicles heading from Iraq into Syria destined for the SDF. However the SDF did not retaliate and no casualties were reported as a result of the air strike. On the same day Russian special forces opened a crossing on the Euphrates river between areas held by the Syrian Government and SDF in the Deir ez-Zor Governorate. While the SDF stated that the Syrian military was preparing to enter the city of Manbij in northeastern Aleppo, the Syrian government responded by saying the build up of the Syrian military near Manbij was being done in order to prevent the Turkish military from entering the city. On the same day, Turkish forces shelled Ras al-Ayn and fired machine guns in the vicinity of the city.

== Operation timeline ==
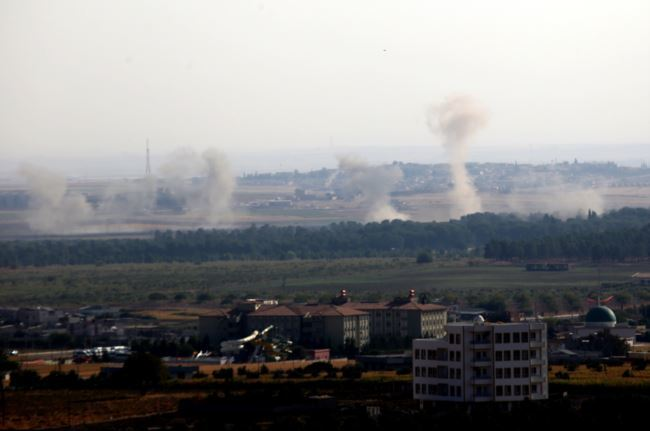
Ras al-Ayn bombing on 10 October 2019.

=== 9 October 2019 ===
The operation began on 9 October 2019, with Turkish airstrikes and howitzers targeting the SDF-held towns of Tell Abyad, Ras al-Ayn where thousands of people were reported to have fled the town, Ayn Issa and Qamishli. The start of the incursion was symbolic, as it was the 21st anniversary of the PKK leader Abdullah Öcalan's expulsion from Syria in 1998 by the government of Hafez al-Assad.

In response to the cross-border shelling, SDF's spokesman stated that Turkey was targeting civilians. Six rockets were later launched at the Turkish city of Nusaybin as a response by the YPG, and two reportedly hit the Turkish town Ceylanpınar. The SDF also announced in response to the start of the Turkish operation they would be halting anti-ISIL operations, and that two civilians had been killed. In response to the airstrikes, the SDF called upon the United States to establish a no-fly zone over northern Syria.

During the day, under pressure from Congressmen and public opinion, Trump sent a letter to Erdoğan urging him to come to an agreement with General Mazloum and avoid any further conflict. Enclosed within the letter was a copy of a letter written by the General detailing concessions the General would be willing to make. Trump also threatened economic retaliation, stating "I don't want to be responsible for destroying the Turkish economy." According to official sources, Erdoğan took offense to the letter, reportedly throwing it in the trash. The White House released the letter to the press on 16 October, receiving wide ridicule.

==== Ground offensive ====
By the end of the day, the Turkish military announced that the ground phase of the operation had begun from three points including Tell Abyad.

=== 10 October 2019 ===
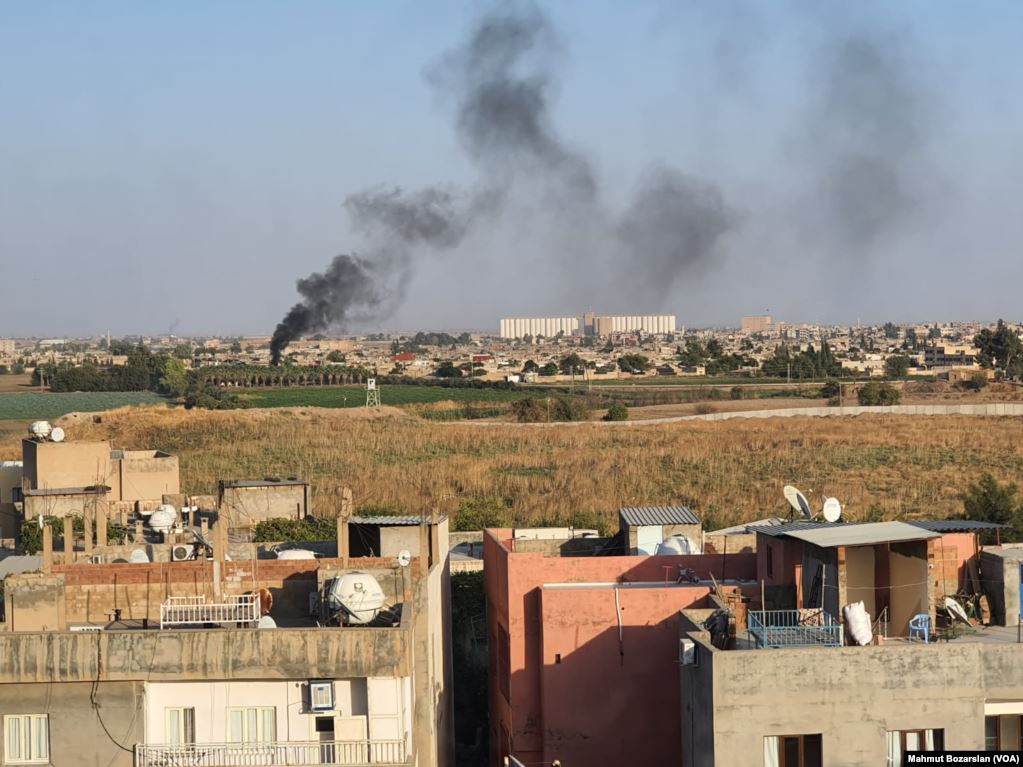
Smoke rising above Qamishli on 10 October 2019

Before dawn on the morning of 10 October 2019, the Turkish military officially began the ground offensive against the SDF; they also announced they had hit 181 targets in northern Syria, and 14,000 rebels backed by Turkey, including Ahrar al-Sharqiya rebel group, Sultan Murad Division, and Hamza Division, are also taking part in the Turkish-led offensive. According to a research paper published this October by the pro-government Turkish think tank SETA, "Out of the 28 factions [in the Syrian National Army], 21 were previously supported by the United States, three of them via the Pentagon’s program to combat DAESH. Eighteen of these factions were supplied by the CIA via the MOM Operations Room in Turkey, a joint intelligence operation room of the 'Friends of Syria' to support the armed opposition. Fourteen factions of the 28 were also recipients of the U.S.-supplied TOW anti-tank guided missiles."

The SDF said they repelled a Turkish advance into Tell Abyad. Later during the day, clashes reportedly broke out between the SDF and Turkish-aligned forces near al-Bab. Turkish-led forces made advances around the area of Tell Abyad and captured the villages of Tabatin and Al-Mushrifah. By nightfall Turkish Armed Forces declared control of 11 villages. As fighting went on around Tell Abyad, the Syrian National Army announced it captured the villages of Mishrifah, Al-Hawi, Barzan, Haj Ali and a farm east of the city. During Turkish air strikes during the fighting, SDF stated that the Turkish air force hit a prison that was holding captured ISIL fighters. Turkish media reported in the late evening that 174 SDF fighters were killed, wounded or captured.

Turkish President Recep Tayyip Erdoğan stated that day that 109 SDF fighters had been killed in the operation as well as an unspecified number of fighters wounded and captured. In a speech to lawmakers from Erdoğan's AKP, the Turkish president also threatened to flood Europe with 3.6 million refugees if European nations continued to criticize the military operation, in particular if they labelled it an invasion.

70,000 people fled from border towns in the SDF following Turkish bombardment.

According to Turkey's Ministry of National Defence, one Turkish soldier was killed by the YPG.

=== 11 October 2019 ===
NATO Secretary General Jens Stoltenberg meets with Turkish President Recep Tayyip Erdoğan.

Senior Department of Defense officials brief Pentagon reporters, 11 October 2019.

Joint press conference by NATO Secretary General and Turkish minister of foreign affairs Mevlüt Çavuşoğlu, 11 October 2019.

Two journalists were wounded in Nusaybin, when the building they were filming from came under fire from Qamishli across the border by SDF fighters. The incident was broadcast live on Turkish TV channels, according to Turkish sources.

Three civilians were killed in Suruc by SDF shelling. In response to the attack, Turkey shelled YPG positions in Kobani, across the border from Suruç. Eight more civilians were killed later in the day in Nusaybin and 35 were injured by SDF mortar attack, raising the total civilians killed by SDF shelling in Turkey to 18, according to Turkish sources.

Seven civilians were killed in Syria by Turkish forces in the Tal Abyad area including three killed by Turkish snipers according to SOHR.

As reported on this day, according to the Turkish Ministry of National Defence, a total of 399 SDF fighters were killed, captured or wounded since the start of the Turkish military operation.

The Syrian National Army stated to have taken the village of Halawa which is southeast of Tell Abyad. TAF and SNA announced the capture of Tell Halaf later in the day and released a video from inside the town.

In the city of Qamishli, a suspected ISIL car bomb killed five civilians, while a reported Turkish artillery strike hit a nearby prison, and five suspected ISIL members, previously detained in SDF custody, escaped according to SDF.

In the city of Kobanî, the area immediately around a U.S. special forces base experienced heavy shelling by Turkish artillery; the U.S. troops did not retaliate, but withdrew after the shelling ended. Turkey responded by denying that it targeted the U.S. base, instead stating that it had fired upon SDF positions. The Pentagon further raised concerns that the Turkish Army deliberately "bracketed" US Forces stationed in Kobanî with artillery fire. According to Turkish Defense Minister, the mortar attack targeting the town of Suruç earlier in the day was deliberately launched 1000 meters from the US base in Kobanî by SDF to avoid Turkish retaliation and the attack was in response.

The BBC reported that 100,000 people have fled their homes in northern Syria. The Kurdish Red Crescent (Heyva Sor) said there had been 11 confirmed civilian deaths so far. Turkey's military confirmed a soldier's death, and said three others had been wounded.

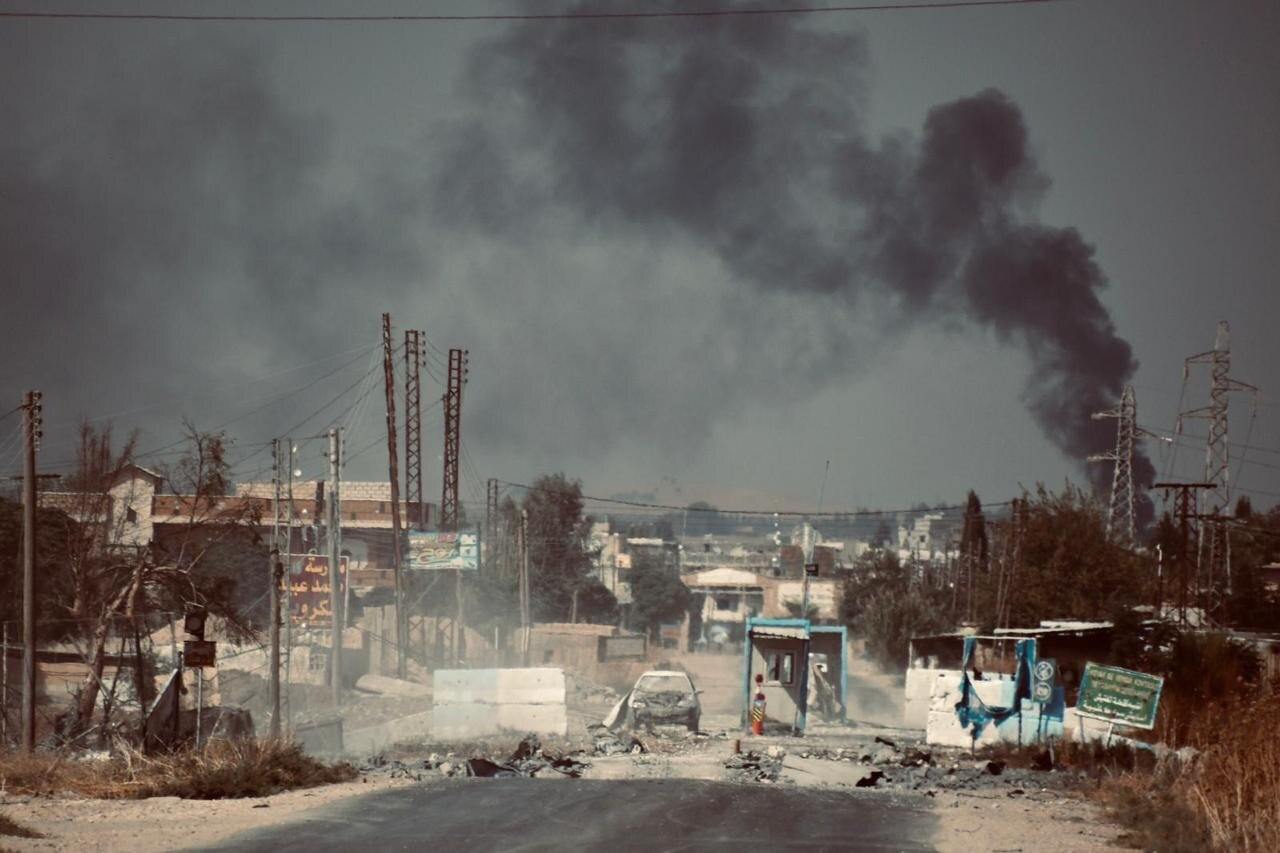
A checkpoint, abandoned by the SDF outside of Ras al-Ayn on 11 October

Turkey's Ministry of National Defence announced that three more soldiers had been killed by the YPG, two of which were killed in a mortar attack on a Turkish military base in a Turkish-occupied part of Syria. This brought the total number of Turkish soldiers killed in the operation to four. The SOHR reported that the actual number of Turkish soldiers killed in the operation was six. Later in the day, the SOHR reported that at least 12 Turkish border guards were either killed or wounded in a confrontation with the SDF in Kobanî.

=== 12 October 2019 ===
Turkish Armed Forces and Syrian National Army said they reached the M4 highway, 32 km (20 mi) deep into Syrian territory and effectively cutting the supply line between Manbij and Qamishli. SNA also said they captured 18 villages close to M4 highway in eastern Raqqah.

Turkish interior minister Süleyman Soylu announced that nearly 300 mortar shells had been fired at Mardin Province by the SDF since the start of the operation.

Around 12:00 (UTC+03:00), the TAF and SNA stated they had captured Ras al-Ayn, but the SDF denied that Turkey had taken control of the city.

Turkish-backed members of Islamist militia Ahrar al-Sharqiya executed Hevrin Khalaf, Secretary General of the Future Syria Party. Nine civilians, including Khalaf, were executed by the Ahrar al-Sharqiya fighters at a roadblock on the M4 highway south of Tal Abyad. Turkish news source Yeni Safak reported that Khalaf was "neutralized" in a "successful operation" against a politician affiliated with a "terrorist" organization. Her execution was widely described by Western sources as a war crime under international law. A spokesman for Ahrar al-Sharqiya meanwhile announced that she was killed for being "an agent for U.S. intelligence".

A Bellingcat video solidly traces the killings to rebels backed by Turkey Ahrar al-Sharqiya.

=== 13 October 2019 ===
Video from Voice of America Turkish service shows a residential building hit by a mortar shell in the southeastern Turkish city of Akcakale, near the Syria–Turkey border, 13 October

Battle of Tell Abyad, 9–13 October

SNA advances in Tell Abyad area

Turkish Armed Forces and Syrian National Army announced the capture of the town of Suluk, located in Tell Abyad District, in the early morning. The SOHR confirmed that the Turkish forces and SNA had taken full control of Suluk, and clashes were nearing towards Ayn Issa. The SOHR also reported that pro-Turkish forces had targeted an ambulance in the Tell Abyad area which remains missing.

The SOHR also reported that the SDF was able to regain almost all control over the contested city of Ras al-Ayn after a counterattack.

==== Tell Abyad captured and M4 highway cut by Turkey and SNA ====
Turkish Armed Forces and Syrian National Army announced in the afternoon they had captured the center of Tell Abyad. Turkish Armed Forces and Syrian National Army fully captured Tall Abyad late in the afternoon according to the SOHR. Turkish Armed Forces and Syrian National Army also cut the M4 highway according to SOHR. Turkish sources also reported that SDF shelling towards Jarablus had killed 2 Syrian civilians.

In light of the pro-Turkish forces advance on Ayn Issa, the SDF stated that 785 ISIL-linked people had escaped from a detention camp in the area, SDF also stated the escapees received assistance of the pro-Turkish forces and Turkish airstrikes. In contrast, Turkey stated that the SDF released ISIL prisoners at the Tell Abyad prison before the arrival of Turkish forces. This statement was supported by U.S. President Donald Trump, but opposed by senior U.S. officials who stated that Turkish-backed Free Syrian Army (FSA) forces were the ones freeing ISIL prisoners.

United States Secretary of Defense Mark Esper said that US was planning to evacuate all 1,000 remaining soldiers from northern Syria. US also informed SDF of its intention to withdraw from military bases in Manbij and Kobanî and had already evacuated from Ayn Issa according to SOHR and The Washington Post.

==== Syrian government–SDF deal ====
Shortly after the capture of Tall Abyad by Turkey and SNA, a deal between the Syrian government and SDF was reached whereby the Syrian Army would be allowed to enter the towns of Kobanî and Manbij in order to deter a possible Turkish military offensive in those areas.

Later an advisor to leader of AKP Recep Tayyip Erdoğan, Yasin Aktay, said there could be conflict between the two armies, if the Syrian government tries to enter northeastern Syria.

SDF commander-in-chief Mazloum Abdi said he was willing to ally with the Syrian government for the sake of saving the Kurdish population in Northern Syria from what he called a genocide.

=== 14 October 2019 ===
Russian and Syrian forces were reported to have been deployed at the front line between areas controlled by the Manbij Military Council and Euphrates Shield groups respectively, with further deployments to take place along the Syrian-Turkish border. In addition, the SOHR reported that the U.S. forces in the region were attempting to hinder the Russian and Syrian deployments in the region.

The SOHR reported that violent clashes had continued in Ras Al-Ayn and its countryside at the border strip, where the Turkish forces were attempting to encircle the city completely and to cut off the road between Ras Al-Ayn and Tal Tamr, under a cover of artillery shelling and airstrikes with the purpose of taking control of the city by 15 October. Turkish aerial and ground bombardment were reported to have occurred in the border town Al-Darbasiyyah targeting civilian houses which caused 4 reported injuries of medical personnel as per the SOHR.

Turkish President Recep Tayyip Erdoğan told a press conference that Turkey had received a positive response from Russia on Kobani and that Turkey was at the execution phase of its Manbij decision. Turkish Armed forces deployed additional troops to Manbij frontline as of the previous night according to Turkish sources. Turkish Minister of National Defence Hulusi Akar said that Tal Abyad and Ras al-Ayn were under Turkish control and that works were ongoing for the whole region.

The Syrian Army reportedly deployed to the town of Al-Thawrah, as well as Ayn Issa, Tell Tamer and as close as 6 km from the Syria–Turkey border. It also took over the 93rd Brigade Headquarters just south of Ayn Issa, as well as Al-Jarniyah to the east of the Euphrates. The Syrian Army further reported taking control of the Tabqa Dam. The Syrian flag was reportedly raised for the first time in years in several towns and villages in the Al-Hasakah Governorate, such as the city of Al-Yaarubiyah.

Jarabulus Military Council was reportedly to have targeted a vehicle south of Jarabulus by a guided missile leaving 2 persons dead in conjunction with an assassination that targeted members of Turkey-loyal factions south of Azaz.

Turkish Armed Forces and Syrian National Army launched a military operation to capture Manbij in the late afternoon. Turkish Armed Forces and Syrian National Army captured 3 villages in the Manbij countryside shortly after the launch of the operation according to Turkish sources. At the same time, Syrian state media stated that the Syrian Army had started entering the town.

==== Announcement of total U.S. withdrawal from north Syria ====
Later in the day, U.S. President Donald Trump announced that all U.S. personnel would withdraw from Syria except those in Al-Tanf base.

=== 15 October 2019 ===
SNA advances in the Manbij area

The SOHR reported that a counterattack was carried out by the SDF in the outskirts and western countryside of Ras al-Ayn city, and managed to achieve an advancement in the area recovering 3 areas lost previously.

2 civilians were killed and 12 were wounded in Kızıltepe, Turkey after an SDF mortar attack according to Turkish sources.

Turkish President Erdoğan, speaking at the Turkic Council in Baku, said: "We are now announcing the establishment of a safe area 444 km from west to east and 32 km from north to south, to which the refugees in our country will return." President Erdoğan also said a total of 1,000 square kilometres (390 sq mi) had been captured by TAF and SNA since the start of the operation. President Erdoğan also said a Turkish soldier was killed in Manbij by Syrian Army artillery fire and that there was an intense retaliatory fire for the attack which made the regime pay a heavy price.

Syrian Army forces started entering the town of Manbij according to SOHR, but were blocked by US troops when trying to enter Kobani according to SOHR, which resulted in the convoy's return to Manbij. Syrian Army forces also entered Al-Thawrah according to Syrian government media. Later, Erdoğan told that Syrian Government troops entering Manbij is "not negative" and adding "as long as terrorists in the area are cleaned".

=== 16 October 2019 ===
Villages around the M4 in Jazira province were reportedly shelled by the TAF at dawn while shelling and clashes had caused power outages and a water shortage in the city of Al-Hasakah, the latter of which returned after 5 days since it had been cut off, as per a SOHR report. The SOHR also reported that clashes continued to the west of Ayn Issa as the SDF attempted to launch a counterattack where they were able to successfully regain 2 locations. Clashes had also broken out within the SDF-controlled camp in Ayn Issa between families of ISIL members and displaced civilians which resulted in 2 deaths, as per the SOHR report.

Heavy shelling and airstrikes by the TAF were reported in Ras al-Ayn with heavy fighting on the ground according to SOHR. The SOHR further reported that Turkish forces and allied factions had launched a wide scale offensive and managed to advance into parts of the Ras al-Ayn city. Turkish President Erdoğan announced that Turkey controlled over 1200 square kilometers area since start of the operation.

The Russian military deployed near Kobani on 16 October in the afternoon after crossing Qara Cossack bridge from Manbij to the east of Euphrates according to SOHR. The SOHR also reported that the Syrian Army had completed its deployment in Ayn Issa, north of Raqqa. The Syrian Army also reportedly entered the city of Kobanî at nightfall. This was precipitated by the sudden advance of the Syrian National Army towards the Kurdish-held border city.

==== U.S. army withdrawal from its military bases ====
US forces withdrew and destroyed its former air base, south of Kobanî. The airbase was the largest U.S. base in Syria, capable of landing C-130 as well as C-17 heavy transport planes.

=== 17 October 2019 ===
TAF and SNA forces completely besieged and captured half of Ras al-Ayn after getting around the town and cutting off the roads leading to it amid heavy clashes according to SOHR.

Turkish Interior Minister Süleyman Soylu stated that over 980 mortar shells and rockets were launched at Turkey by SDF since the start of the operation killing 20 civilians.

==== 120-hour ceasefire ====
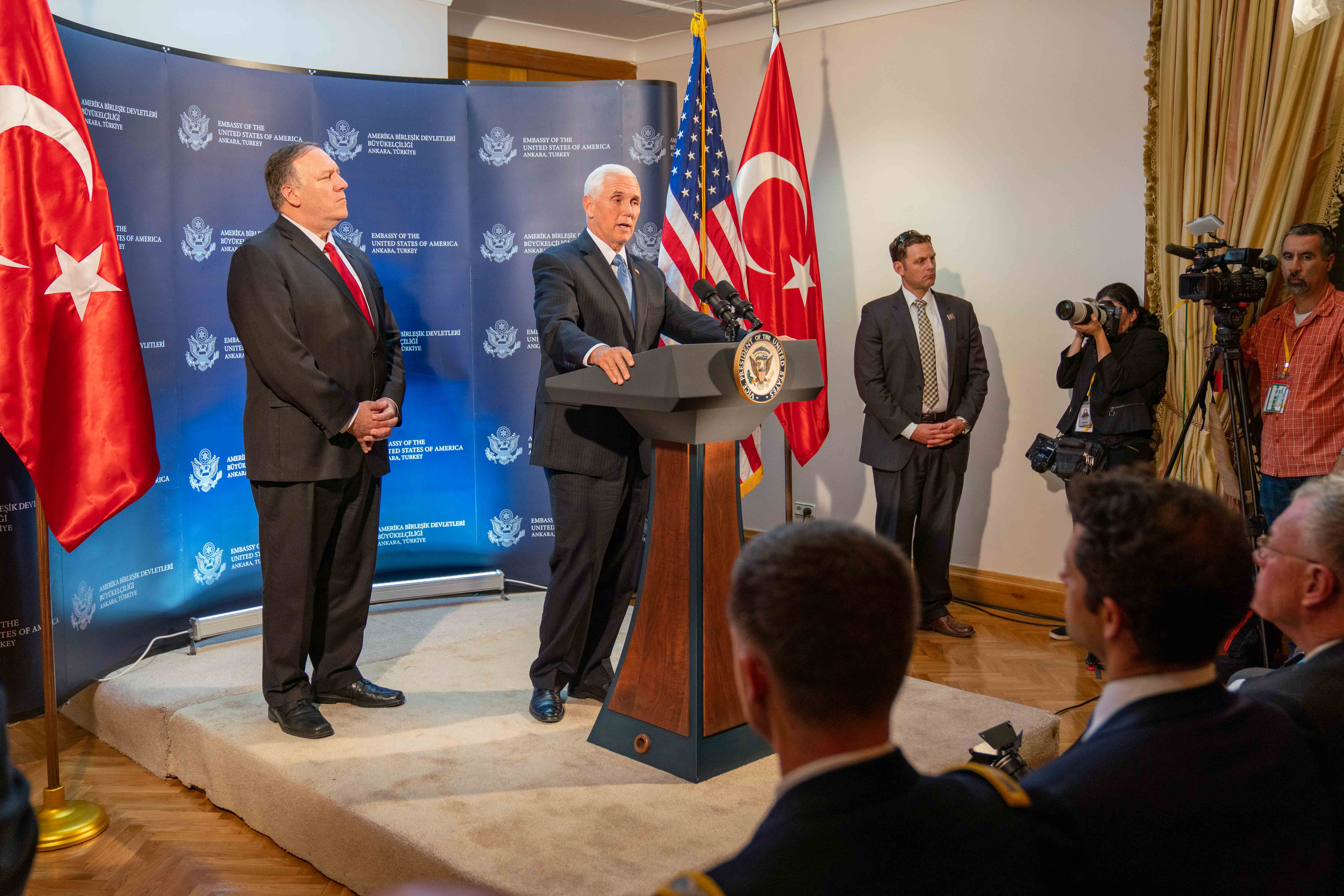
Vice President Mike Pence and U.S. Secretary of State Mike Pompeo at a joint press conference in Ankara on 17 October 2019

On 17 October 2019, US Vice President Mike Pence and Turkish President Recep Tayyip Erdoğan reached a deal to implement a 120-hour cease-fire for Turkey's operation in northern Syria to allow SDF to withdraw from a designated safe zone, spanning from the Turkey-Syria border to 20 miles (32 km) south. Mike Pence stated that once the military operation completely stops all sanctions imposed on Turkey by the United States would be lifted and there would be no further sanctions. According to a US statement, the safe zone would be "primarily enforced by the Turkish Armed Forces". This ceasefire deal was described as another US betrayal of the Kurds and a Kurdish surrender to Turkey by several US commentators and officials.

Turkish Foreign Minister Mevlüt Çavuşoğlu stated that it was not a ceasefire but a temporary pause to allow SDF to withdraw from the designated safe zone, after which if completed the operation would end and if not the operation would continue. The SDF commander Mazloum Abdi said that they accepted the ceasefire agreement only in the area between Tall Abyad and Ras al-Ayn.

The Syrian Kurdish politician Salih Muslim stated that "Our people did not want this war. We welcome the ceasefire, but we will defend ourselves in the event of any attack ... Ceasefire is one thing and surrender is another thing, and we are ready to defend ourselves. We will not accept the occupation of northern Syria."

=== During the ceasefire ===
==== 18 October 2019 ====
Cautious calm prevailed at the east of Euphrates on 18 October according to SOHR with minor clashes in besieged Ras al-Ayn. The SDF claimed that Turkey was violating the ceasefire and of shelling civilian areas of Ras al-Ayn. An unnamed US official said the following day that Turkish backed forces had violated the ceasefire, and the SDF had stopped fighting.

Turkey announced it aimed to establish 12 "observation posts" in its safe zone, with President Erdoğan stating that Turkey will respond if the Syrian government "makes a mistake".

==== 19 October 2019 ====
SDF had not withdrawn from any positions east of Euphrates despite the passage of 37 hours of the US-Turkish agreement to suspend the Turkish military operation for 120 hours according to SOHR. SOHR also reported that since the start of the operation, Turkish Armed Forces and allies had captured an area of 2,419 square kilometres (934 sq mi). Both sides claimed that the other side was violating the ceasefire. The SDF stated that Turkish forces prevented medical aid from reaching Ras al-Ain, a claim backed by SOHR. Unnamed US officials said the "ceasefire is not holding". In the afternoon the SDF said an aid convoy had been let through, after having been prevented from entering the town since Thursday.

==== 20 October 2019 ====
===== SDF withdraws from Ras al-Ayn =====
Battle of Ras al-Ayn, 9–20 October

SNA advances in Ras al-Ayn area

A Turkish soldier was killed by a mortar attack near Tal Abyad due to violations of YPG according to Turkish Defense Ministry, whilst the SDF stated that 16 fighters had been killed by Turkish forces. SDF fully withdrew from Ras al-Ayn alongside the aid convoy per SOHR. Both sides claimed that the other side made ceasefire violations.

===== Continued U.S. withdrawal =====
US forces withdrew from their airbase near Sarrin as well as their airbase near Tell Beydar and destroyed it per SOHR. US forces had completely withdrew from the countrysides of Aleppo and Raqqa per SDC as well. In the largest ground move to date, a United States convoy of almost 500 personnel moved eastward through northern Syria towards the border of Iraq. As they withdrew, locals threw rotten produce and shouted insults at them, demonstrating a sense of betrayal among the populace.

U.S. President Donald Trump favored leaving a contingent of 200–300 US troops in Deir ez-Zur countryside of eastern Syria where majority of the country's oil fields are located per NYT and WSJ. The SDF, however, stated that "The fields have stayed in our hands. We have an agreement with the [Syrian] regime to give them some of our positions along the Turkish border, but we have not negotiated with them on the oil fields yet. There will probably be a version of joint control and revenue sharing with the regime from these fields. I don’t know if Trump understands this."

==== 21 October 2019 ====
The SOHR reported continued ceasefire violations despite the withdrawal of the SDF from Ras al-Ayn. Per SOHR, Turkish drone strikes had targeted a vehicle carrying 4 members of the SDF near Ain Issa, resulting in the death of all fighters. The Abu Rasin area, east of Ras al-Ayn also experienced heavy clashes and shelling by Turkey as per SOHR.

On the aftermath of the SDF withdrawal from the Ras al-Ayn, there were widespread accounts of looting, theft, burning of houses and kidnappings by the pro-Turkish forces with documented examples of members of the Hamza Division per to the SOHR.

The SOHR reported a US withdrawal from northern Syria with a military convoy passing through Simalka border into Iraq at midnight.

==== 22 October 2019 ====
Russian Defense Minister Sergei Shoigu has stated that Russia would need to deploy additional troops and equipment to Syria to patrol the border. As the deadline of the US-brokered 120-hour ceasefire agreement was nearing, Shoigu further stated that the US had less than two hours to comply with the agreement (i.e., removing the sanctions against Turkey) and suggested that the US forces had until the end of the 120-hour period to withdraw from Syria.

According to Syrian state news channel Al-Ekhbaria, Syrian President Assad has told Russian President Putin that his government rejects the occupation of Syria's lands under any pretext in a phone call today. In a reference to the SDF during his visit to the war zone near Al-Habeet in Idlib, the Syrian President Assad stated that "We said we are ready to support any group that takes up popular resistance against Erdogan and Turkey. This is not a political decision, we have not made a political decision, this is a constitutional duty and this is a national duty. If we don't do this, we don't deserve the homeland."

U.S. senator Mitch McConnell introduced a resolution in opposition to President Trump's withdrawal from Syria.

Jim Jeffrey, US special envoy for Syria and the global coalition against ISIL, said that he was not consulted or advised in advance about the withdrawal of the US from Syria.

===== Russian–Turkish memorandum =====
Turkish and Turkish-backed opposition control SDF control Syrian Army control SDF control with SAA border presence For a more detailed, up-to-date, interactive map, see here.

On 22 October 2019, Russian President Vladimir Putin and Turkish President Recep Tayyip Erdoğan met in Sochi and reached an agreement about the situation in Syria. They subsequently released a 10-point memorandum detailing the provisions of the agreement.

In the agreement, the established status quo of the Operation Peace Spring area, covering Tell Abyad and Ras Al Ayn with a depth of 32 kilometers from the border, will be maintained. Starting from 12.00 noon on 23 October, Russian military police and Syrian border guards would enter the Syrian border territory outside the Operation Peace Spring area to facilitate the removal of the YPG in the area with a depth of 30 kilometers from the border, which would be finalized within 150 hours. Hereafter, joint Russian–Turkish patrols would start to the west and east of the Operation Peace Spring area to a depth of 10 kilometers from the border, excluding Qamishli city. The YPG would be removed from both Manbij and Tal Rifat.

Russian President Putin informed Syrian President Assad about the provisions of the deal in a phone call. The Russian government announced that Assad voiced his support for the agreement and was ready to deploy the Syrian border guards in line with the agreement.

==== 23 October 2019 ====
President Trump announced that there was a 'permanent' ceasefire in the region and sanctions on Turkey would therefore be lifted, but he also added that the word 'permanent' is questionable for that part of the world. US lawmakers publicly criticized Trump's decision to lift the sanctions.

Dmitry Peskov, the Russian presidential press secretary, urged the Kurdish forces to withdraw from Syria's border namely because the Syrian border guards and Russian military police would have to step back otherwise, adding that the remaining Kurdish units would be 'steamrolled' by the Turkish military. Peskov further stated that the United States had both betrayed and abandoned the Kurds despite being their closest ally in recent years.

As Newsweek first reported, it's stated that the United States is considering and preparing to deploy tanks and troops to defend the oil in eastern Syria. Even though the stated purpose is preventing ISIL from regaining the oil fields, the effort is just as likely an attempt to block Syria and Russia.

==== 24 October 2019 ====
Syria's state news agency SANA reported that Turkish troops and allied fighters attacked Syrian army positions outside Tal Tamr, resulting in several Syrian casualties as they fought back, and clashed with Kurdish-led fighters. The SOHR also confirmed clashes between the SDF and the Syrian National Army near Tal Tamr. The Kurdish-led SDF said that three of its troops were killed during the fighting with the Syrian National Army.

Russia carried out several airstrikes in the Syrian rebel-held territory, targeting the Idlib, Hama, and Latakia provinces among comments by analysts that Idlib, the remaining Turkey-supported rebel stronghold, was the Syrian government's next target.

During the NATO meeting, Germany's Defense Minister Annegret Kramp-Karrenbauer had presented a proposal for an internationally monitored security zone in northeast Syria to be mandated by the United Nations. The following day, the Russian Foreign Minister Sergey Lavrov rejected the idea of a NATO-controlled security zone in Syria. On 26 October, the Turkish Foreign Minister Mevlut Cavusoglu also rejected the German plan for an international security zone and said that the proposal was not realistic.

==== 25 October 2019 ====
US Defense Secretary Mark Esper said the United States would send troops, including 'mechanized' forces, to defend the oil in eastern Syria to keep it from ISIL. It was unclear whether the Kurds would welcome the Americans again in the aftermath of the US withdrawal, as Syrian Kurdish leader Ilham Ahmed commented earlier on 24 October that "If the U.S. presence in the area is not going to benefit us when it comes to stability, security, and [stopping] the genocide and ethnic cleansing, they won’t be welcomed."

The Russian Defense Ministry announced that around 300 Russian military police have arrived in Syria. The military police, from the Russian region of Chechnya, would patrol the border region and help with the withdrawal of the Kurdish forces from the border region.

==== 26 October 2019 ====
The Turkish President Erdogan said that "If this area is not cleared from terrorists at the end of the 150 hours, then we will handle the situation by ourselves and will do all the cleansing work." The Turkish president also criticized the European Union of lying to provide the 6 billion euros to help house and feed around 3.6 million Syrian refugees residing in Turkey, while stating that the EU only provided half of the promised amount and adding that Turkey has spent around 40 billion euros. He warned that Turkey will open its border for the refugees to go to Europe if European countries failed to provide more financial support for the return of the refugees to Syria.

A U.S. military convoy drove south of Qamishli heading towards the oil fields in Deir el-Zour. The SOHR also reported the convoy when it earlier arrived from Iraq. Major General Igor Konashenkov, the Russian Defense Ministry spokesman, characterized the US actions to send armored vehicles and combat troops to protect the oil in eastern Syria as 'banditry'. The Russian Foreign Minister Sergei Lavrov spoke with the US Secretary of State Mike Pompeo about Syria, with the Russian side emphasizing the sovereignty and territorial integrity of Syria according to the Russian public statement.

A large convoy of Syrian government troops was deployed to eight villages at the Ras al-Ayn area along the M4 highway and close to the Syrian–Turkish border.

Casualties were reported after clashes in Tal Tamr and Ras al-Ayn, nine dead among the pro-Turkish forces and six dead among the SDF.

==== 27 October 2019 ====
The SDF released a statement saying: "The SDF is redeploying to new positions away from the Turkish–Syrian border across northeast Syria in accordance with the terms of the agreement in order to stop the bloodshed and to protect the inhabitants of the region from Turkish attacks."

==== 29 October 2019 ====
The SOHR reported reoccurring clashes between joint Syrian–SDF forces and Turkish-led forces in the area between Tal Tamr and Ras al-Ayn. During the clashes along the border, Turkish forces reportedly killed 6 Syrian soldiers near Ras al-Ayn. Meantime, Turkish Ministry of National Defense announced that they have captured 18 persons who stated to be Syrian government forces.

Russian Defense Minister Sergei Shoigu announced that the Kurdish-led armed forces had withdrawn from the safe zone along the Syria–Turkey border.

== Post-ceasefire activity ==
=== Diplomatic relations ===
In a press statement addressed to the SDF, the Syrian Defense Ministry announced that they would accept any unit who is willing to join the Syrian military in a joint effort to battle invading Turkish troops and the Turkish-supported Syrian rebels, and offered reconciliation to those not needed for security. The Syrian Interior Ministry offered civil services across the northeast, as they described the difficult living conditions due to the Turkish-led incursion. They also offered to integrate the Asayesh security forces of the SDF into the government's internal security agency. The Syrian Education Ministry offered to support the children, as they described that children are deprived of schooling due to the unrest.

In response, the SDF said that they appreciated the efforts to unify Syria's defense and repel the Turkish aggression but also stated: "Our position was clear from the beginning, wherein uniting the ranks should begin from a political settlement that recognizes and preserves the exclusivity of the SDF and its structure, and creates a sound mechanism for restructuring the Syrian military establishment as an overarching framework for unifying efforts."

=== Situation around the safe zone ===
On 31 October, the Turkish President Erdogan announced that the joint Turkish-Russian patrols in northeast Syria would begin on Friday. On 1 November 2019, Turkish and Russian forces began their joint patrols.

Since the ceasefire, there have been intermittent clashes between Syrian government troops and Turkish-backed forces around Ras al-Ain and Tal Tamr. Turkey returned 18 Syrian government soldiers who were captured by Turkish-backed Syrian fighters south of Ras al-Ayn amidst growing tensions between Syria and Turkey. The Turkish Defense Ministry announced the handover on 1 November.

==== 31 October 2019 ====
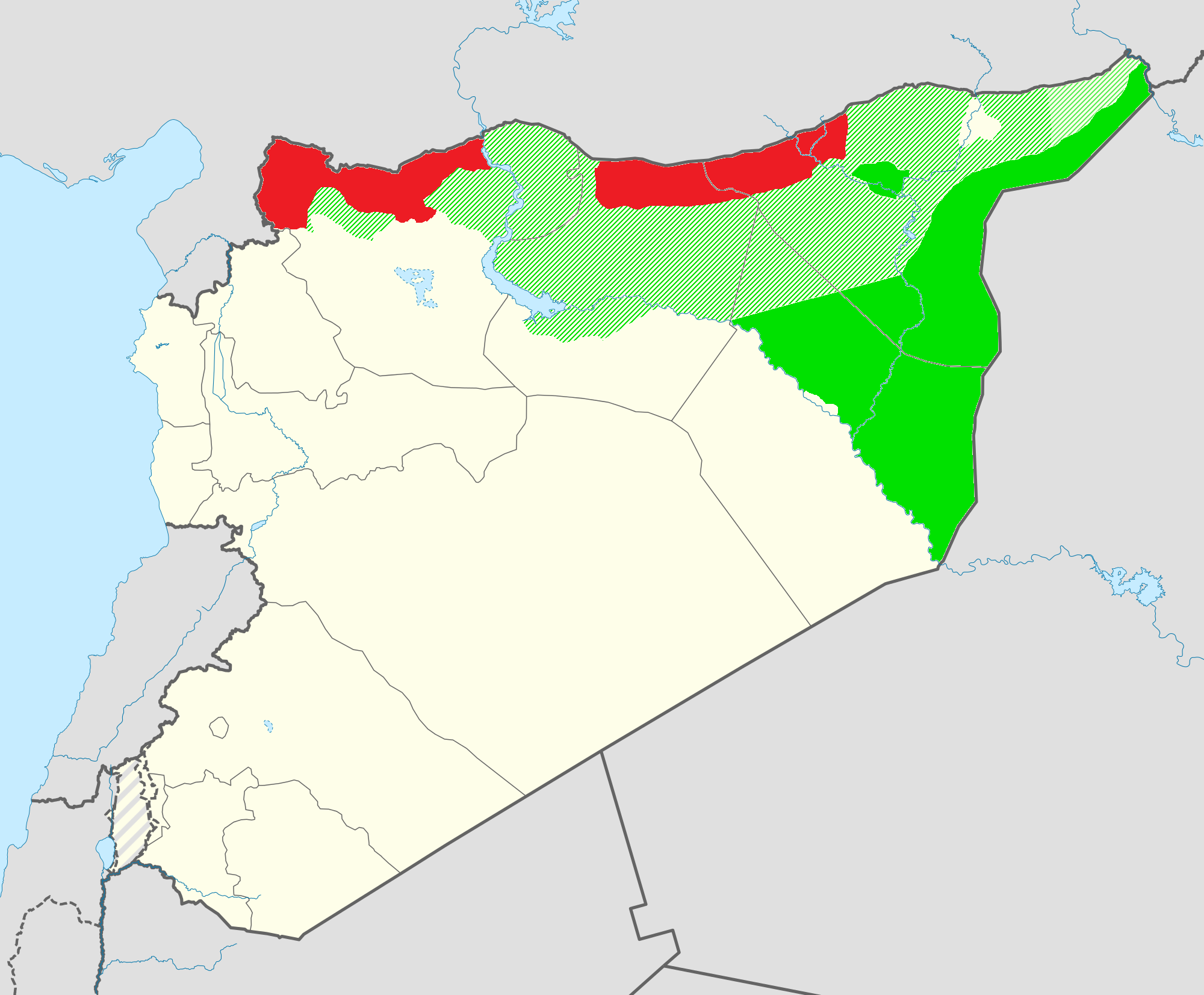
SDF-controlled territory (green) and Turkish-controlled territory (red) in October 2019

The SNA shelled the village of Tal-al ward resulting in the deaths of 2 civilians and injuring an additional 5. Small skirmishes occurred in the western side of Tal Al-ward between forces of the SAA, SDF and SNA. The SAA withdrew from the villages of Temir, Zirgan and Dirbesiye following bombardment from the SNA. The SDF bombarded the villages of Azizia and Jamiliyyeh, which caused the 2 military vehicles of the SNA to be destroyed. 3 people were killed and 4 injured from the shelling.

According to pro-SDF media US reinforcements arrived at Sarin Base including 17 armored vehicles and 82 trucks. Nevertheless, the base was captured by Russian forces on 17 November.

The SDF began a counter-offensive around Tall Tamr.

November 2019 Syria bombings: On 2 November, a car bomb attack killed at least 13 civilians in Tell Abyad, 2 weeks after its capture from SDF. Turkey and SNA accused the SDF as responsible for the attack. The SDF responded in a press statement stating: "We believe this is the work of the Turkish state and their intelligence and mercenaries to frighten and terrorize the local people".

==== 1 November 2019 ====
The SNA attempted to enter the vicinity of Tell Tamer. Firefights between the SDF and SNA occurred in the villages of Anek al-Hawa, Tal Muhammad, Khirbet Jammu and Mahmudiya. The SDF claims it has made advances into the villages of Mahmudiya and Khirbet Jammu.

==== 6 November 2019 ====
The SNA launched an offensive north of Ayn Issa, shelling SDF positions. The SDF and SNA clashed in villages of Mahmudiyyeh, Soda, Arisha, Abu Rasin, al-Qantra area as well as other areas on the outskirts of Ayn Issa north of al-Raqqah city as well as the exchange of shelling between the SDF and SNA. Clashes also occurred in the village of Aneeq Al-Hawa of Abu Rasin town as well as Manajir town south of Ras Al-Ayn.

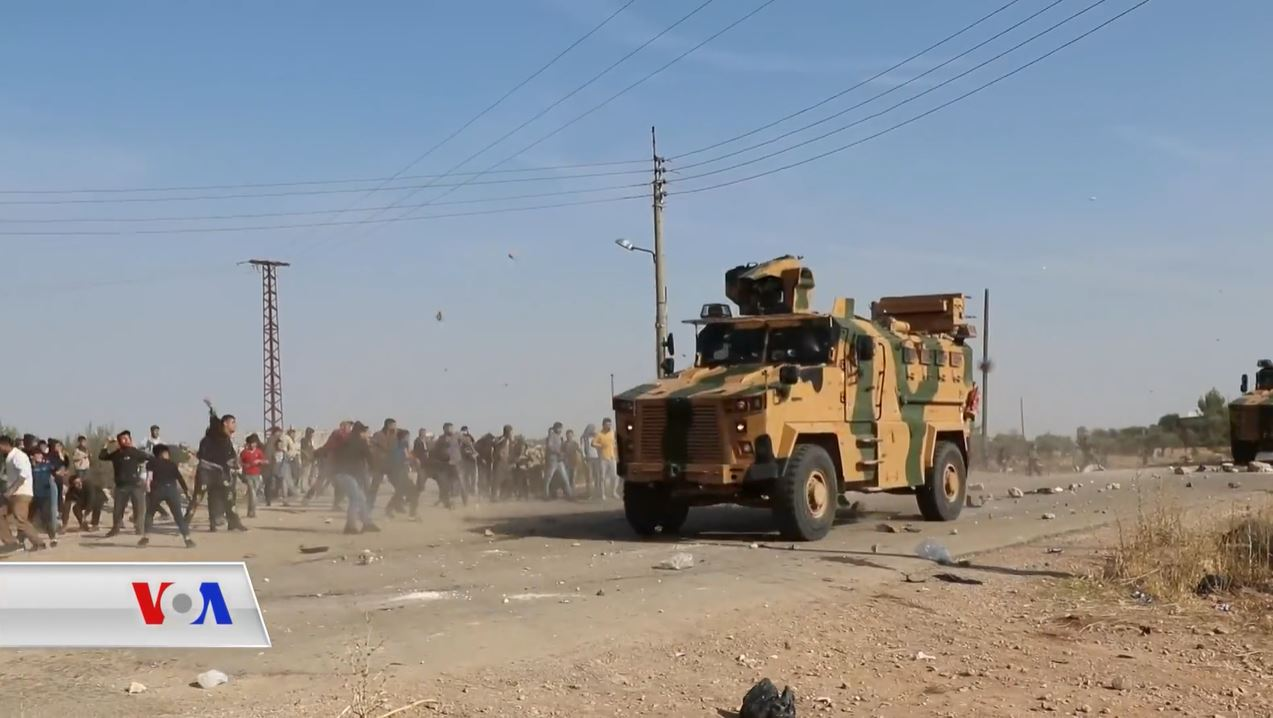
Civilians throwing rocks at a Turkish Kirpi MRAP in Kobanî, 5 November 2019

==== 8 November 2019 ====
Protests occurred in Northern Syria against joint Turkish/Russian patrol protesters threw rocks and shoes at armored vehicles. Turkish patrols responded with tear gas. One protester was run over during the protest and died shortly after.

==== 11 November 2019 ====
A car bomb south of Tell Abyad killed 8 civilians and wounded over 13. Turkey claimed that the YPG was responsible for the attack.

==== 16 November 2019 ====
A car bomb in Al-Bab, targeting its bus terminal, killed 19 people, including 13 civilians. Additional 30 persons were wounded. Turkish Ministry of National Defense said that YPG and PKK was responsible for the attack. No group has claimed responsibility for the attack.

Turkish Ministry of National Defense said that the Turkish Army had defused over 988 IEDs and 442 mines, which were placed by the YPG, since the start of the operation.

The SDF made advances into the northern countryside of Tal Tamr town in the area leading to Abu Rasin, capturing positions and points north of Tal Tamr, the TAF responded with drone strikes on SDF positions.

==== 17 November 2019 ====
Russian forces entered the abandoned US base near Sarrin and seized control of it. Video footage of the abandoned US base was shared by Russian forces who entered the base showing abandoned US equipment.

==== 18 November 2019 ====
According to a pro-opposition media source, an SNA commander, Abu Hafs Al-Gharbi was killed in clashes with the SDF.

==== Ayn Issa clashes ====
Clashes occurred between SNA and SDF on 20 November around the SDF controlled Ayn Issa, clashes resulted in the death of 8 SNA Fighters and 4 SDF fighters in the first day of clashes. According to pro-SDF media SNA attacked villages around Ayn Issa with rockets, UAVs and heavy weapons, as well as the positions in Tell Tamer. As a result of fighting in Ayn Issa, guards of Ayn Issa refugee camp – home to ISIS families, left their posts to fight the SNA and several ISIS families managed to escape as a result. Later in the same day SDF launched an offensive to retake Shrekrak silos from the SNA, SDF shelled SNA positions and the SNA shelled the surrounding villages controlled by SDF. The SNA continued to advance towards Ayn Issa, which resulted in 13 SNA fighters dying and 6 fighters dying among the SDF. SDF managed to regain full control of Ayn Issa and its surroundings after heavy clashes and a counter attack. Russian Planes flew over Ayn Issa after the failed offensive.

==== 23 November 2019 ====
A car bomb went off in Tell Abyad, killing 9 and wounding 20 civilians.

==== 24 November 2019 ====
The SDF captured villages near Ayn Issa, after failed SNA offensive near Ayn Issa. 21 SNA fighters were killed in the fighting. SDF casualties are unknown.

== War crimes ==
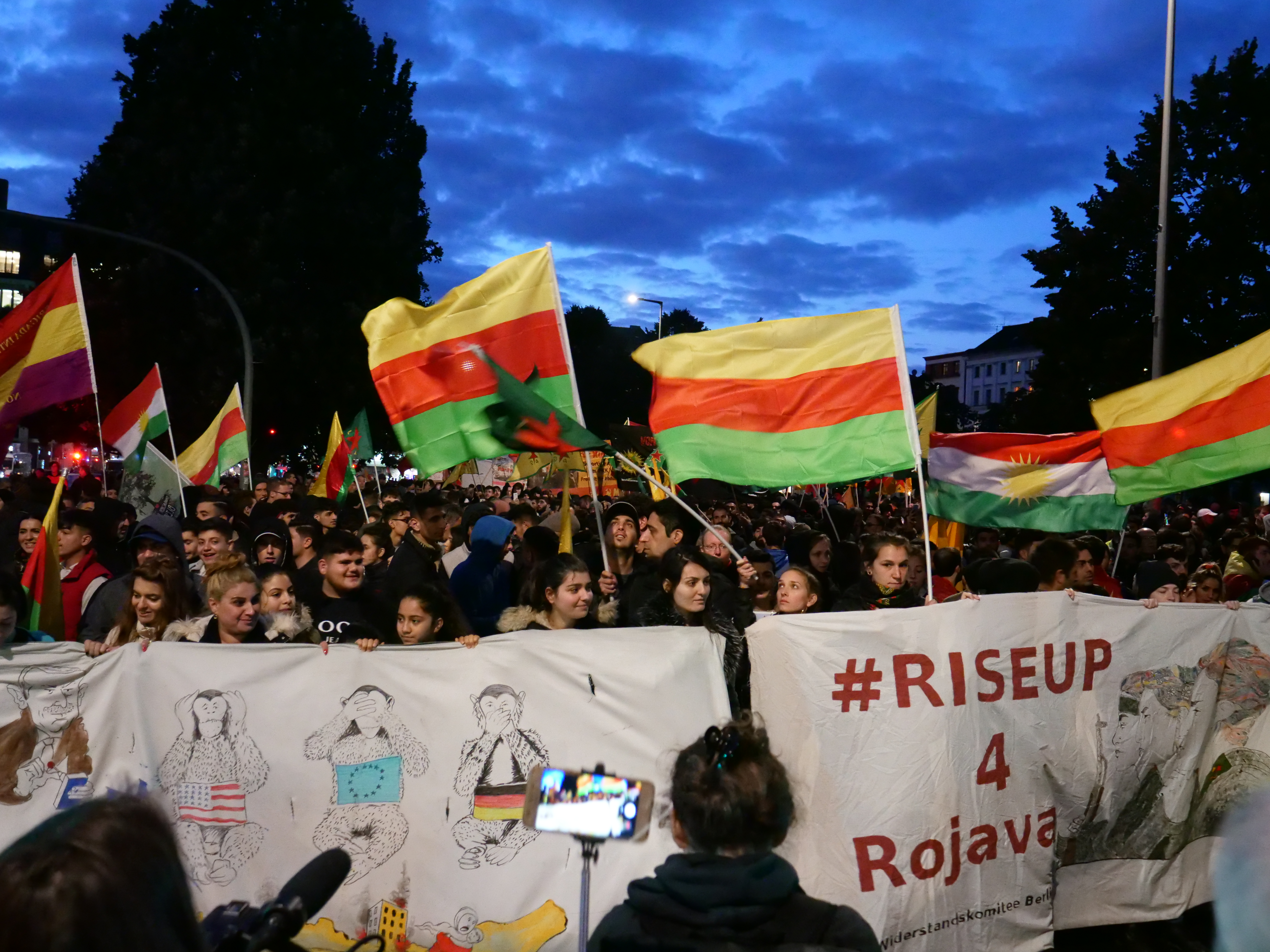
Protest against Turkey's military offensive on 10 October 2019

In October 2019, Syrian Kurdish authorities and doctors reported a number of patients with severe burns seemingly caused by a chemical weapon, accusing Turkey of employing the chemical white phosphorus to target people. Hamish de Bretton-Gordon, a former commander of the UK's chemical, biological, radiological and nuclear regiment, said of wounds he had been shown pictures of, "the most likely culprit is white phosphorus". Syrian Kurdish authorities also accused Turkey of using napalm.

The Organisation for the Prohibition of Chemical Weapons (OPCW) stated that it was aware of the situation and collecting information over the reported use of chemical weapons but cautioned that it had not yet determined the credibility of the allegations. However, the OPCW did not launch an investigation into the alleged use of white phosphorus, stating that the issue falls outside its remit as white phosphorus injuries are produced by thermal rather than chemical properties. It remarked that "White phosphorus is commonly used in military operations to produce smoke or provide illumination. When white phosphorus is used as smoke, illumination or as an incendiary weapon, its use does not fall under the purview of the Chemical Weapons Convention".

Amnesty International stated that it had gathered evidence of war crimes and other violations committed by Turkish and Turkey-backed Syrian forces who are said to "have displayed a shameful disregard for civilian life, carrying out serious violations and war crimes, including summary killings and unlawful attacks that have killed and injured civilians".

In Autumn 2019, video footage and photographs emerged in which Turkish-allied Syrian rebel forces were seen apparently committing executions and other war crimes; the Syrian National Army condemned these acts and the Turkish government said it was investigating. Jim Jeffrey, the US envoy for Syria and the global coalition against ISIL, has stated in a hearing before the US Senate Foreign Relations Committee that they have seen several incidents which they consider war crimes committed by the Turkish-supported Syrian opposition forces, and characterized these groups as very dangerous and even extremist in some cases. In a US House Foreign Affairs Committee hearing, he stated that they have reached out to the Turkish government to discuss the war crimes committed by the Turkish-supported opposition.

Hevrin Khalaf, a Syrian Kurdish political leader, and other people, was summarily executed by the armed faction Ahrar al-Sharqiya. UN human rights spokesman Rupert Colville stated that "Turkey could be deemed responsible as a State for violations committed by their affiliated armed groups, as long as Turkey exercises effective control over these groups, or the operations in the course of which those violations occurred. [...] we urge the Turkish authorities to immediately launch an impartial, transparent and independent investigation into both incidents, and to apprehend those responsible, some of whom should be easily identifiable from the video footage they themselves shared on social media." According to Committee on Violations under the Ministry of Defence of Syrian Interim Government, the perpetrators were detained and sent to the military judiciary. Turkish Foreign Minister Mevlut Cavusoglu has responded that Turkey will investigate any allegation of human rights violations in the region and will not tolerate any human rights violation.

Members of the pro-Turkish Levant Front also evicted Christians from their homes in Tell Abyad, though left the local Kurds mostly alone.

In March 2024, a car explosion in the Syrian town of Azaz near the Turkish border resulted in the deaths of 7 individuals and the injury of thirty others during a crowded market time. Suspicions for the attack point towards Kurdish-led YPG or Assad loyalist factions, with no immediate claim of responsibility.

=== Reports by the Syrian Observatory for Human Rights ===
According to the Syrian Observatory for Human Rights (SOHR), Turkish backed forces have looted countless homes in Ras al-Ayn and Tal Abyad have engaged in theft of property, physical, and verbal abuse, kidnappings of civilians for ransom and abuse against the citizens who did not flee. According to the report some civilians, unable to flee, paid smugglers $300 in order to be delivered to the nearest point of the Autonomous Administration areas (Rojava) at which point they were handed over to Turkish intelligence as members of the SDF after their money was taken from them.

A report by SOHR states that Turkish backed factions began demolishing houses in Kormazat villages of local Kurds who fled from fighting as well as members of the SDF from Tal Abyad, as well as taking barley in Abu Julud village in Mabrukah area in the western countryside of Ras Al-Ayn.

=== Population displacement ===
SOHR states that the number of displaced people exceeds 300,000 amid the humanitarian crisis and conflict. People have fled towards the autonomous Kurdish region within the border of Iraq.

Ibrahim Kalin, a Turkish presidential spokesman, has stated that they do not want Syrian government or Kurdish forces in the Syrian border areas but intend Turkey to oversee the region. He further said that Turkey intends to resettle up to 2 million Syrian refugees, currently in Turkey, who will not go back if these areas are under the control of either of these forces.

In response to European criticism, Turkish President Erdoğan warned that Turkey would "open the gates" for 3.6 million refugees who are currently in Turkey to go to Europe if its military operation is called an invasion. This comes under the context that Europe has employed foreign countries such as Turkey to serve as border guards, in a policy of border externalization.

Amnesty International remarked that Turkey "has borne a disproportionate responsibility" hosting 3.6 million refugees from Syria while European countries "have largely devoted their energies to keeping people seeking asylum from their territories" including not resettling the refugees residing in Turkey, the tensions between Turkish citizens and Syrian refugees are rising, and the decline in Turkish public support for refugees has led to an expression in policies where the Turkish government aims to resettle its Syrian refugee population in a demilitarized safe zone with the 2019 military operation as the latest development.

Amnesty International has reported that Turkey is illegally and forcibly deporting its Syrian refugees back to Syria while portraying the returns as voluntary. Hami Aksoy, a Turkish Foreign Ministry spokesman, stated that Turkey rejects Amnesty International's statements about the forceful repatriation and underscores that Turkey is conducting the safe and voluntary return of Syrians.

There are fears of ethnic cleansing of the Kurds from the region.

Jens Laerke, spokesman for the United Nations Office for the Coordination of Humanitarian Affairs said that 94,000 civilians have returned to their homes, while 100,000 are still displaced.

=== ISIL prisoners ===
There are concerns about a possible resurgence of the Islamic State (ISIL) in the region, as the Kurdish-led Syrian Democratic Forces (SDF)—who conducted counter-terrorism operations against ISIL and held the ISIL captives in the region—fight against the Turkish-led offensive and thus could lose control over the detainees. There are at least 10,000 ISIL prisoners and more than 100,000 ISIL family members and other displaced persons in several camps across northeastern Syria. A number of the ISIL detainees are foreign fighters, but their status have become increasingly uncertain due to the Turkish offensive as their own countries refuse to take them. As the threat of ISIL emerged as consequence, European countries have been criticized for failing to act by taking back their nationals, while the situation deteriorates. When asked about the situation after the US withdrawal from Syria, US President Donald Trump dismissed the threat of ISIL, remarking that "they're going to be escaping to Europe".

Îlham Ehmed, a Syrian Kurdish official, stated that the SDF felt betrayed by their American allies for "exposing us to an invasion by Turkish troops who aim to destroy us", remarking that they do not have the resources to both defend against the Turkish attacks and maintain security over the ISIL captives. Nevertheless, as stated by Jim Jeffrey, the US special envoy for Syria and the global coalition against ISIL, on 23 October, almost all of the prisons that the SDF were guarding are still secured and the SDF still have people there. The SDF commander Mazloum Abdi said, on 21 October, that there aren't any prisons in the Turkish-occupied areas and that all prisoners from those areas have been moved to prisons under their control.

As a consequence of the US withdrawal and the Turkish offensive, the SDF will be more restricted in time and resources to help the United States in the fight against ISIL, as it is also focused on the threat from the Turkish forces and the preservation of its autonomy against Syria and Russia.

According to Turkish sources, the SDF freed ISIL prisoners from a prison in Tal Abyad before Turkish forces could arrive. Other US officials, however, refuted the accusations, which they called baseless and false. They stated that the SDF are still defending their bases and are relocating ISIL detainees to facilities further south. They also reported that the Syrian National Army is purposefully releasing ISIL prisoners, previously held by the SDF before their territory was captured.

At least 750 ISIL affiliates were reported by the SDF to have escaped from a displacement camp in Ayn Issa after Turkish bombing on 13 October 2019. On 23 October, Jim Jeffrey stated that over 100 prisoners of ISIL have escaped and that they do not know where the escapees are.

On 18 October, Turkish Ministry of National Defense claimed that YPG had freed over 800 ISIL prisoners in Tal Abyad.

On 19 November, the Defense Department inspector general released a report finding that the American withdrawal and subsequent Turkish incursion allowed ISIL to "reconstitute capabilities and resources within Syria and strengthen its ability to plan attacks abroad".

== Reactions ==
International reactions to Turkey's 2019 operation in northern Syria at a glance. See Reactions to the 2019 Turkish offensive into north-eastern Syria for citations or more information.

=== Domestic Turkish reaction ===
The Turkish offensive initially enjoyed support from party leaders across the political spectrum, with the support of three major opposition parties, but not the Peoples' Democratic Party (HDP). Opposition newsrooms and opposition parties were largely supportive of the operation. However, as time progressed, the Turkish opposition began criticizing the governmental strategy. Opposition Republican People's Party leader Kemal Kılıçdaroğlu blamed the government's "adventurous foreign policy", stating that "If I do not respect the territorial integrity of another government, I will make enemies. Today we have made all the world as our enemies." Meanwhile, opposition İyi Party leader Meral Akşener urged the government to dialogue with Assad in order to make peace while criticizing President Erdoğan for his silence on U.S. sanctions.

According to a research by Metropoll, the amount of support to the operation was at 79 percent, while Operation Olive Branch had 71 percent support according to the poll before.

==== Detainments in Turkey ====
Turkish police detained more than 120 online critics of the Turkish operation for spreading "terrorist propaganda". Turkish prosecutors opened investigations against MPs Sezai Temelli and Pervin Buldan, co-leaders of the pro-Kurdish HDP party. Turkey detained at least 151 members of the HDP, including district officials, and at least 4 HDP mayors for reported links to the PKK, which Turkey considers to be a terrorist group. Turkish authorities have also detained web editor of opposition BirGün newspaper (who was later released) and managing editor of the online news portal Diken.

The government launched a domestic campaign to eradicate dissenting opinions from media, social media, streets actions or any civil parties opposing the military operation. On 10 October, Turkey's broadcasting regulatory body RTÜK warned media that "any broadcasting that may negatively impact the morale and motivation of the soldiers or may mislead citizens through incomplete, falsified or partial information that serves the aims of terror". Social media dissidents, journalists, protesters have been criticized of "terrorism" and harassed via criminal investigation, arbitrary detention and travel bans. Dissidents face lengthy prison sentences if found guilty.

==== Controversy in Northern Cyprus ====
On 12 October President of Northern Cyprus, Mustafa Akıncı made "anti-war" remarks in response to the operation, in which, although defending the right of Turkey to defend itself, said that in all wars there will be much bloodshed. Erdoğan as well as VP Fuat Oktay condemned Akıncı's statement. While Prime Minister of Northern Cyprus, Ersin Tatar's National Unity Party attempted to get a resolution through the legislature that condemned Akıncı, and called for his resignation for his statement. Akıncı also received a slew of death threats, and filed a complaint on 17 October to the police. Erdoğan said that Akıncı's legitimacy is thanks to Turkey, and should therefore support Turkey. Akıncı rebuked Erdogan, stating "There is only one authority decides how to get to this office, it's the Turkish Cypriot people".

=== Sanctions and suspension of arms sales ===
==== European Union ====
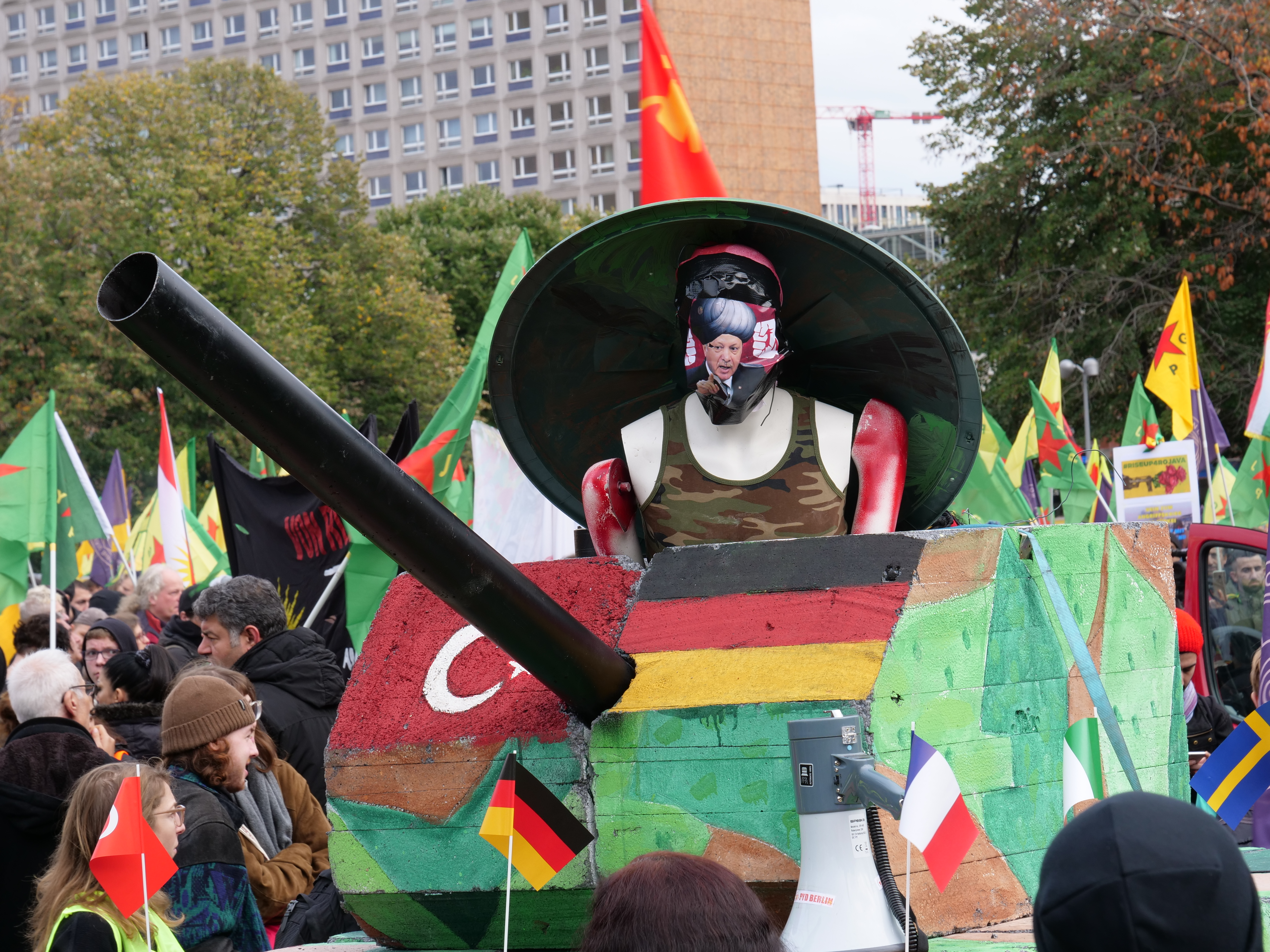
Protest in Berlin against Turkey's military offensive and European arms exports to Turkey

On 10 October, a large majority of Dutch MPs backed the introduction of sanctions against Turkey. France, Germany, the Netherlands, Austria, Finland, Sweden, Spain, Italy, and Norway implemented export restrictions on arms exports to Turkey. France as well as Sweden expressed their intention to back an EU-wide weapons embargo on the nation, with discussions in the European Union on possible union-wide sanctions on Turkey beginning on the 13th. Italy, formerly Turkey's largest arms supplier, later joined the arms embargo against Turkey.

On 14 October, all EU countries agreed to stop selling arms to Turkey, but stopped short of an official union-wide arms embargo. The EU also issued a press release condemning "...Turkeyʼs unilateral military action in North East Syria which causes unacceptable human suffering, undermines the fight against Daʼesh and threatens heavily European security."

==== United States ====
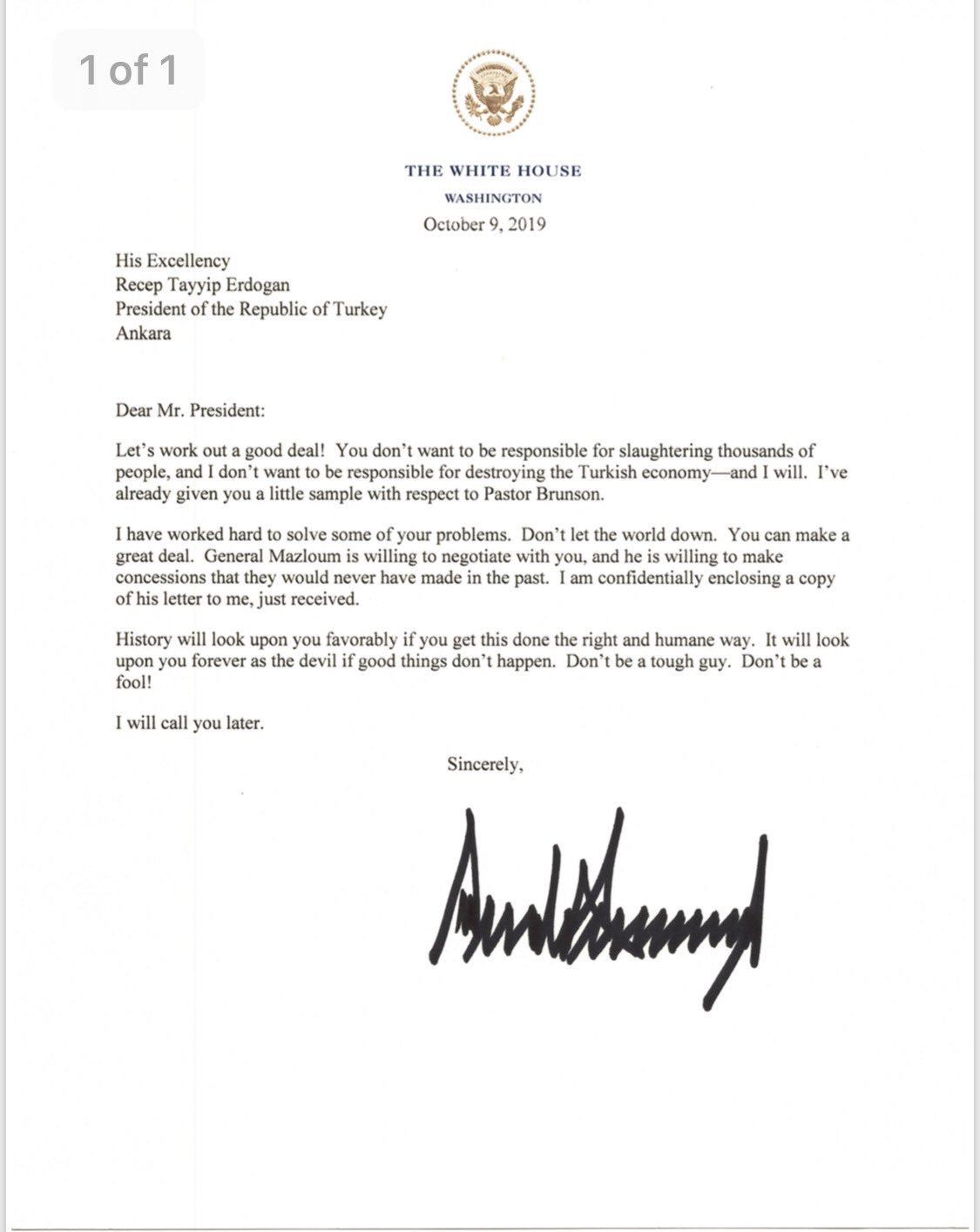
Letter dated 9 October from Donald Trump to Recep Tayyip Erdoğan, leaked to US media on the 16th. On 18 October, Erdoğan told reporters that the language of the letter was a big insult, they weren't going to forget it, and they would have some sort of redress when the time comes.

Trump said he was working with congressional leaders, including the Democratic opposition, to impose "powerful" economic sanctions against Turkey for its cross-border attacks in north-eastern Syria. Senator Lindsey Graham warned that he would "introduce bipartisan sanctions against Turkey if they invade Syria". He said he would also "call for their suspension from NATO if they attack Kurdish forces who assisted the United States in the destruction of the ISIS Caliphate". Bipartisan legislation has been introduced in the Senate to sanction Turkey, as well as in the House of Representatives.

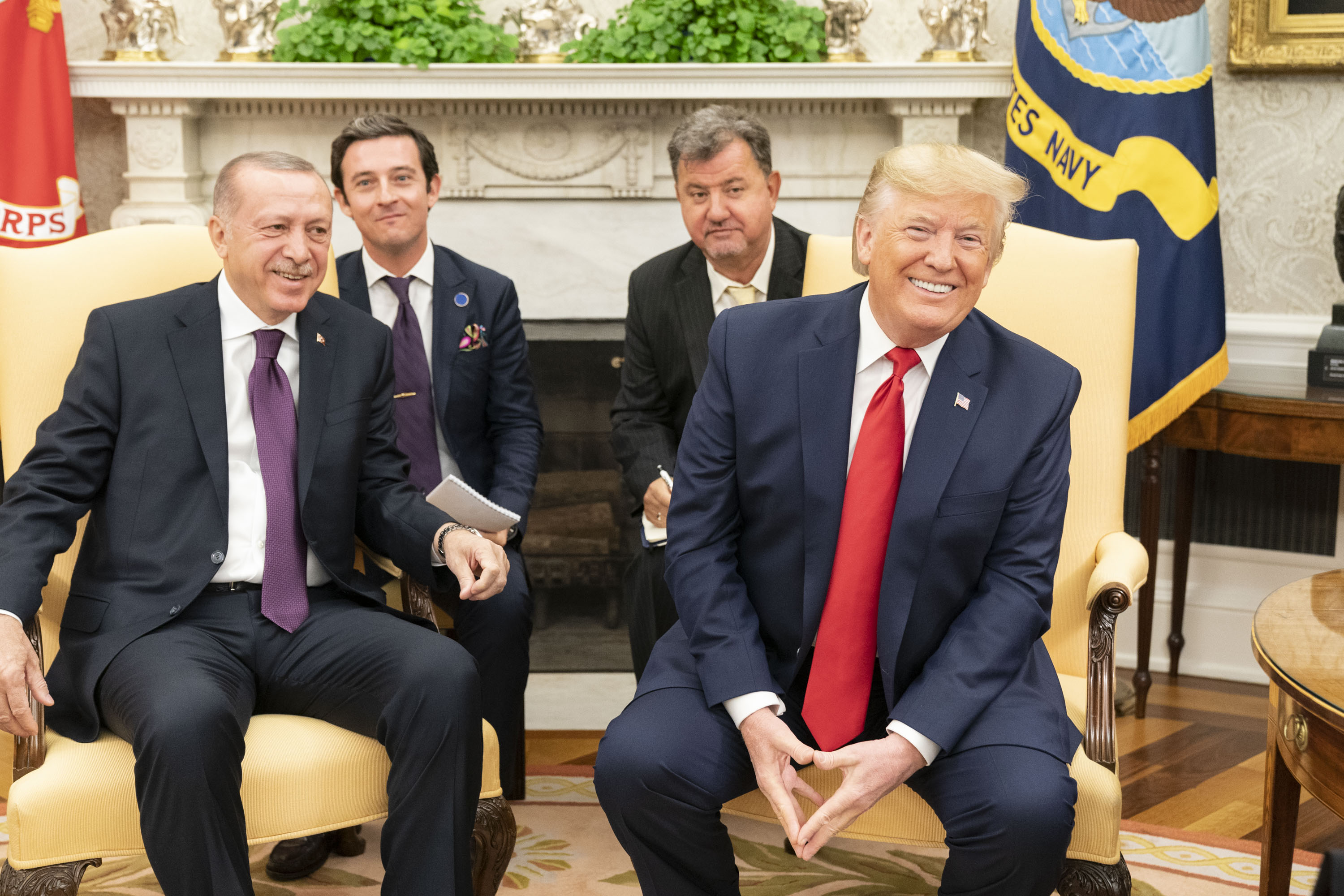
President Donald Trump meets with Turkish President Recep Tayyip Erdoğan in the Oval Office of the White House, 13 November 2019

On 14 October, the U.S. government declared sanctions against the Turkish ministries of defense, interior and energy. The U.S. statement delivered by Treasury Secretary Steven Mnuchin and Vice President Mike Pence denounced the Turkish government for "endangering innocent civilians, and destabilizing the region, including undermining the campaign to defeat ISIS", said that the U.S. had not given a "green light" to a full-on Turkish invasion, and warned that sanctions would continue and worsen "until Turkey embraces an immediate ceasefire". On the same day, U.S. President Donald Trump demanded a ceasefire from Turkey in a conversation with Turkish President Erdoğan, froze negotiations on a $100bn US-Turkey trade deal, and imposed sanctions on Turkish government officials.

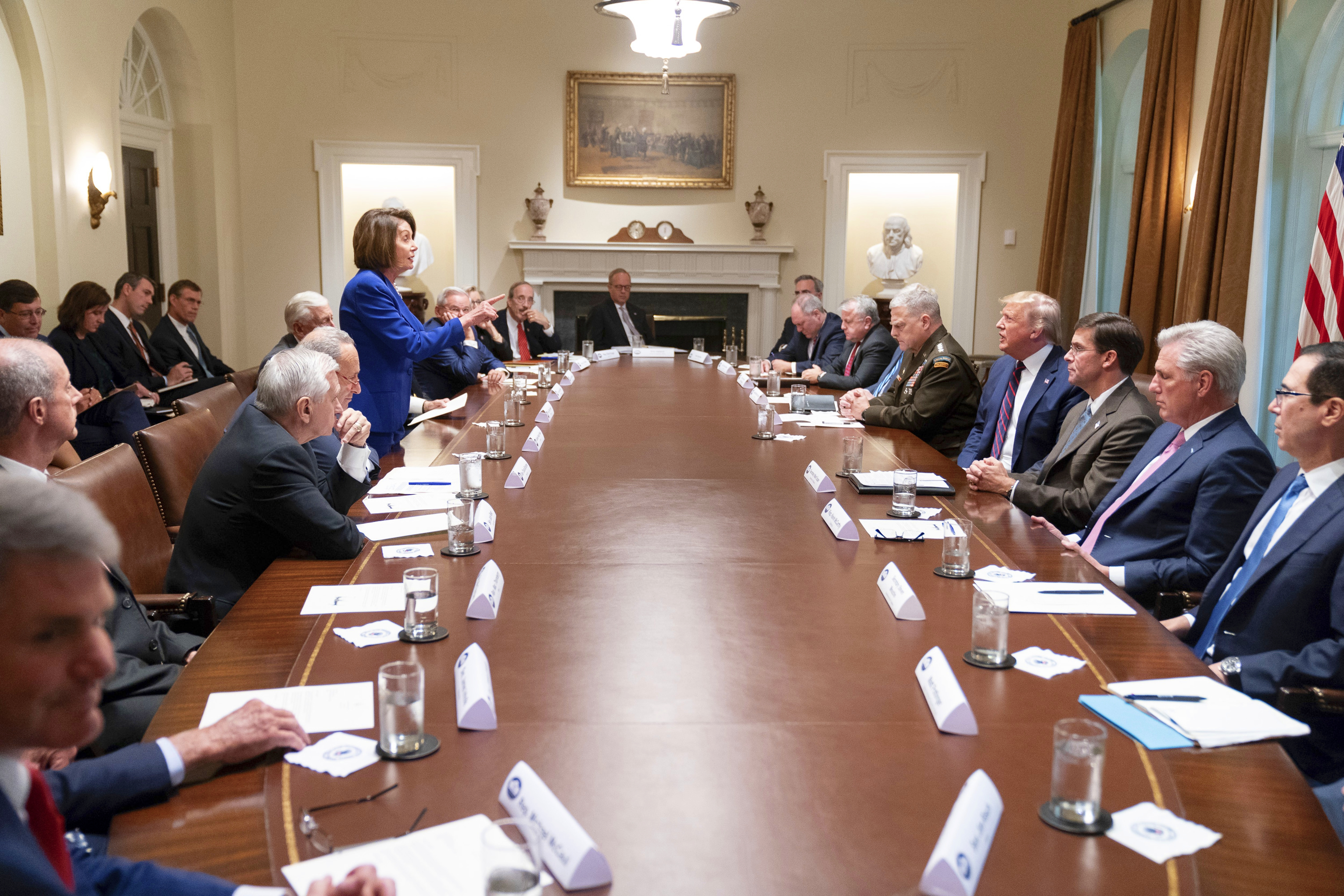
U.S. House Speaker Nancy Pelosi confronts Donald Trump about U.S. withdrawal at a meeting in the White House on 16 October 2019.

On 16 October, the United States House of Representatives, in a rare bipartisan vote of 354 to 60, "condemned" President Trump's withdrawal of U.S. troops from Syria, for, in the view of both parties, "abandoning U.S. allies, undermining the struggle against ISIS, and spurring a humanitarian catastrophe".

On 17 October, after reaching a ceasefire agreement with Turkish President Recep Tayyip Erdoğan, US Vice President Mike Pence announced that all sanctions imposed on Turkey by the United States would be lifted and there would be no further sanctions once a permanent ceasefire was reached in the operation.

On 29 October 2019, the U.S. House of Representatives voted 405–11 to recognize the Armenian genocide, as a result of Turkey's invasion of Syria. However, the motion was blocked in the Senate by South Carolina Republican Senator Lindsey Graham, following a request from the White House. On 12 December 2019, the Senate unanimously passed a resolution recognizing the Armenian genocide, after it had been previously blocked by three different Republican Senators (Lindsey Graham of South Carolina, David Perdue of Georgia and Kevin Cramer of North Dakota) at the request of the White House.

Likewise, Trump's sudden pullout of US forces in Syria was also criticized by many, including former US military personnel, as a "serious betrayal to the Kurds" as well as a "catastrophic blow to US credibility as an ally and Washington's standing on the world stage", with one journalist stating that "this is one of the worst US foreign policy disasters since the Iraq War". On 19 November, the US Defense Department inspector general released a report finding that the American withdrawal and subsequent Turkish incursion allowed ISIL to "reconstitute capabilities and resources within Syria and strengthen its ability to plan attacks abroad". However, James Jeffrey, the US special envoy to Syria, said he had concealed the true number of US troops from the Trump administration, while praising Trump's decision to withdraw troops. “When the situation in northeast Syria had been fairly stable after we defeated ISIS, [Trump] was inclined to pull out. In each case, we then decided to come up with five better arguments for why we needed to stay. And we succeeded both times.” It ended with U.S. forces still operating in Syria, denying Russia and the Syrian regime territory and preventing remnants of ISIS from regrouping. He also noted that no one in Washington had ever offered the Kurdish forces (People's Defense Units) assurances against NATO ally Turkey.

=== Media coverage ===
In Turkey, authorities such as the Chief Prosecutor's Office of Istanbul have been criticized of censoring critical reports of the Turkish offensive into Syria through detaining or harassing journalists in an attempt to "intimidate the media into silence". Furthermore, Turkish President Erdoğan has written op-eds about the Turkish offensive, which has been characterized as propagandist in nature.

Much of western media's coverage and commentary of the U.S.'s role in the conflict emphasized President Donald Trump's "strategic blunder" that led to the Turkish offensive, particularly his upending of the U.S.'s general alliance with the Syrian Kurds, the withdrawal process of U.S. ground forces, and the greater geopolitical and humanitarian impact of the offensive.

ABC News was criticized for incorrectly portraying footage from a Kentucky gun range as footage of Turkish forces bombing Syrian territory in early October. This portrayal of the incident in the video was quickly debunked. The news network has since issued an apology for their mistake.

== Aftermath ==
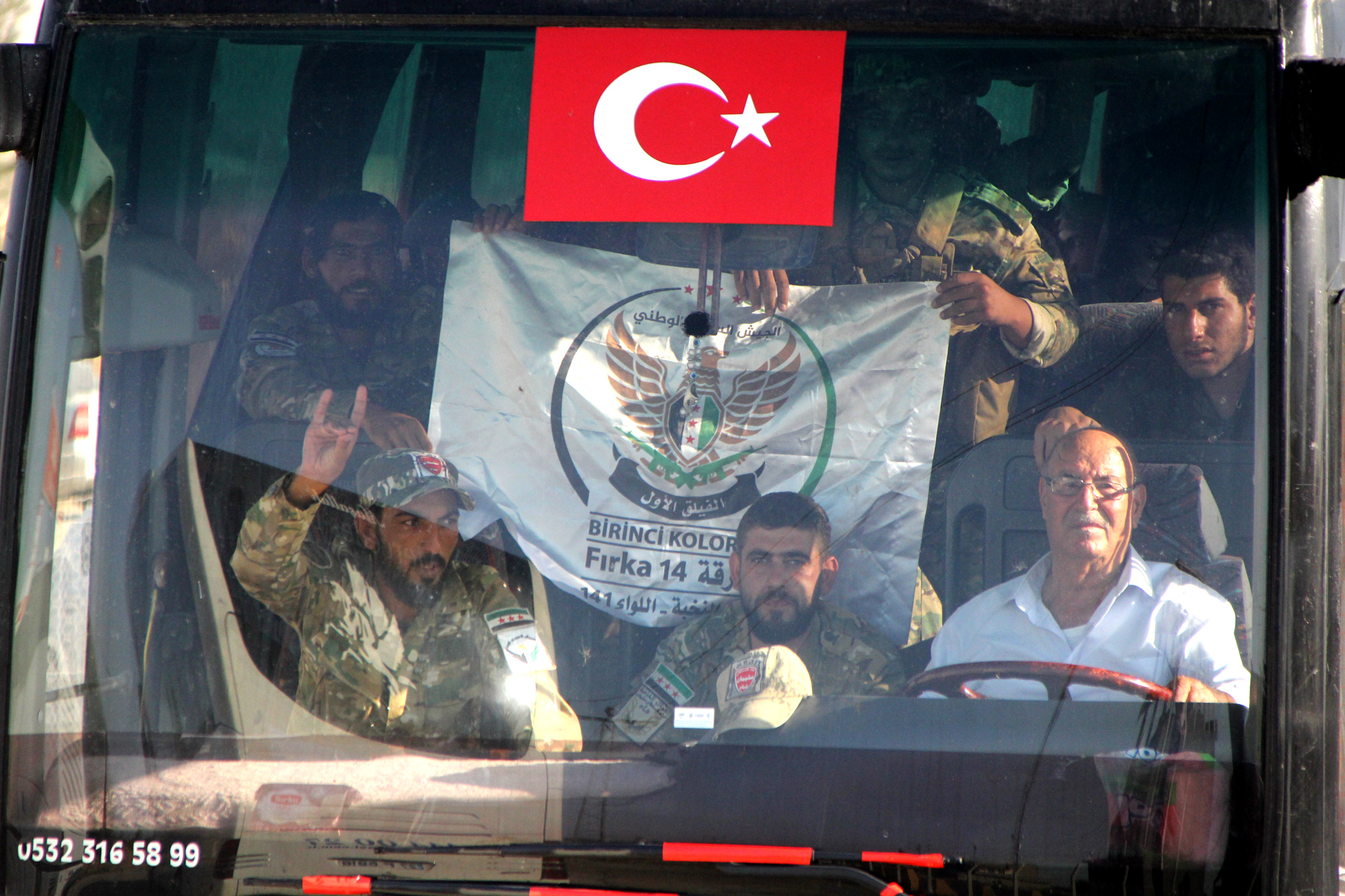
Rebels of the Liwa Sultan Suleyman Shah, a Turkmen group in the Syrian National Army, transported from Azaz to Akçakale during the Turkish offensive (12 October 2019). One of them makes the Grey Wolves sign (left).

In October 2019, in response to the Turkish offensive, Russia arranged for negotiations between the Syrian government in Damascus and the Kurdish-led forces. Mazloum Abdi, the Syrian Kurdish commander-in-chief, announced that they were ready to partner with Vladimir Putin (Russia) and Bashar al-Assad (Syria), stating that "We know that we would have to make painful compromises with Moscow and Bashar al-Assad if we go down the road of working with them. But if we have to choose between compromises and the genocide of our people, we will surely choose life for our people." The details of the agreement is unknown, but there are reports that suggest that the SDF will be incorporated into the Syrian Armed Forces and that northeastern Syria will come under direct rule of the Syrian government in Damascus. According to Syrian Kurdish officials, the deal allows Syrian government forces to take over security in some border areas, but their own administration would maintain control of local institutions.

The prospects for Kurdish autonomy in the region was severely diminished, because the Kurds were exposed to the Turkish-led offensive by the US withdrawal and the Russia-backed Syrian government forces under Assad—whose commonality is enmity towards Turkey and Sunni rebel militias—regained their foothold in northeast Syria after the Kurds had to seek their help. In regards to the United States and the situation, Mazloum Abdi stated that "We are disappointed and frustrated by the current crisis. Our people are under attack, and their safety is our paramount concern. Two questions remain: How can we best protect our people? And is the United States still our ally?" A deep sense of betrayal by their once American allies has come to be felt among the Syrian Kurdish populace.

As announced by Russia's Ministry of Defense on 15 October, Russian forces have started to patrol the region along the line of contact between Turkish and Syrian forces, indicating that Russia is filling the security vacuum from the sudden US withdrawal. Video footage shows Russian soldiers and journalists touring a base that the US left behind. Alexander Lavrentiev, Russia's special envoy on Syria, warned that the Turkish offensive into Syria is unacceptable and stated that Russia is seeking to prevent conflict between Turkish and Syrian troops.

Several US lawmakers have criticized the abandonment of their Kurdish allies, remarking that it undermines US credibility as an ally while benefiting Russia, Iran, and the Syrian regime of Assad. Meanwhile, several commentators in Moscow have stated that the situation is not in the immediate Russian interests, as the Turkish intervention in Syria clashes with Russia's backing of the Syrian government in the region, but it may provide opportunities for Russia as mediator as the US withdraws from Syria. Commentators have remarked that, since the US withdrawal, Russia has cemented its status as the key power broker in the Middle East.

Due to the situation in Syria, there are signs of a schism between Turkey and other NATO members, in which NATO is seen as effectively "powerless" to manage the situation and the Turkish government is aware that NATO does not hold much leverage. Furthermore, US President Trump, as well as US military and diplomatic officials, has cited the NATO membership of Turkey as a key reason that the United States can not be involved in the conflict between the Turkish and Syrian Kurdish forces. Meanwhile, due to Turkey's strategic position between Europe and the Middle East, the NATO alliance members are in a situation where they have limited themselves to relatively muted criticism.

The U.S. is reviewing the potential withdrawal of its nuclear weapons from Incirlik airbase under NATO's nuclear sharing as a result of the Turkish offensive per NYT. Republican senator Lindsey Graham and Democratic representative Eric Swalwell have called for possibly suspending Turkey's membership in NATO.

On 9 December, Russian troops entered Raqqa and began distributing humanitarian aid.

=== Turkish actions ===
Erdogan stated that Turkey was ready to resettle the Syrian refugees in the northern area that Turkey had invaded, and that Turkey would pay for it if necessary. On 9 December 2019, various local accounts indicated that Turkey was moving Syrian refugees into its zone of operations in Northern Syria for the first time. Erdogan said that Turkey was working to settle one million people in the cities of Tal Abyad and Ras Al-Ain in northern Syria. This has led to fears of population change.

Russia said it would pledge to remove Turkish forces from a key highway in northern Syria, and replace them with Russian forces to maintain stability. Meanwhile, Turkey began to appoint mayors in several northern Syrian towns.

It was reported that the Russian and Turkish armies had made a deal whereby electricity would be supplied to Tal Abyad by Russia's allies, the Syrian Democratic Forces (SDF); while water would be supplied by the Alouk water station that is controlled by Turkish forces. This deal was mainly facilitated by Russian military officials.

It appeared that Turkey was withdrawing all of its forces away from the al-Shirkark silos, which hold important supplies of wheat, this seemed to be a result of Russian mediation.

Russian and Turkish forces are continuing their joint patrols. Questions remained about how much control Turkey has over its proxies, such as the Free Syrian Army.

=== Syrian and AANES actions ===
Some reports stated that Bashar Assad was favorable towards Russia's efforts to restore calm and to stabilize the situation in Syria.

Meanwhile, various Kurdish faction that were historical rivals began to meet in order to work together more. Their stated reason was to stand together against Russia and Turkey more strongly if needed. The Russian government has informed the Kurdish factions that they should reconcile and come up with a unified set of demands to clarify to Russia. Various Kurdish factions blamed each other and their council for lack of progress.

Mustafa Bali, head of the Syrian Democratic Forces (SDF) said there were some agreements on the ground with the Syrian government, for Syrian forces to be deployed along the border. Russian military officials forged agreements between Syria, Turkey and SDF for areas to be patrolled by each side.

The national Syrian government sent representatives to northeast Syria to meet with local groups there in order to address their concerns and to emphasize unity and combined effort to address problems. A meeting occurred in Qamishli city, in northeast Syria, that included Syrian national officials, and delegates from Kurdish, Arab, and Syrian figures and forces. The delegates emphasized their desire to help to protect Syria as a whole.

At a panel discussion on the conflict in December 2019, several experts said the conflict was slowly moving towards resolution. One expert said that the "Astana" diplomatic process, involving Turkey, Russia, and Iran, was having some positive results. Experts also said that Bashar Assad had made progress in restoring rule by local councils in areas affected by the conflict.

Russia said it would pledge to remove Turkish forces from a key highway in northern Syria, and replace them with Russian forces to maintain stability. Meanwhile, Turkey began to appoint mayors in several northern Syrian towns.

On 9 December 2019, various local accounts indicated that Turkey was moving Syrian refugees into its zone of operations in northern Syria for the first time. Erdogan said that Turkey was working to settle one million people in the cities of Tal Abyad and Ras Al-Ain in northern Syria, leading to fears of population changes.

=== Diplomacy with NATO member nations ===
At the NATO summit in London in December 2019, President Emmanuel Macron of France highlighted major differences with Turkey over the definition of terrorism, and said there was little chance this aspect of the conflict could be resolved positively. Macron criticized Turkey strongly for fighting against groups who had been allied with France and the West in fighting terrorism.

Numerous issues in resolving the conflict emerged at the NATO summit in London. Turkey proposed a safe zone where Syrian refugees could be relocated, but this idea did not receive support from all parties. One professed "exclusive" press report claimed that prior to the NATO Summit, there was a meeting at 10 Downing Street of the leaders of France, the UK, Germany and Turkey. One key point that emerged that the Western countries insisted that refugees could only be relocated voluntarily. Meanwhile, there were concerns in NATO about Turkey's growing closeness with Russia.

Erdogan claimed that a four-way summit on Syria was scheduled to occur in Turkey in February 2020, to include Turkey, Germany, the UK and France.

=== Diplomacy with nations outside NATO ===
At a meeting in Damascus, Russian and Syrian officials clearly stated their support for Syria regaining control over all of its territory. The United Arab Emirates also expressed official support for Assad.

A new round of meetings for the Astana summit process took place in the Kazakh capital Nur Sultan. The meeting includes Russia, Syria, Turkey and Iran.

== See also ==
- List of invasions in the 21st century
- Operation Olive Branch
- Operation Euphrates Shield
- Eastern Syria Insurgency
- Syrian–Turkish border clashes during the Syrian Civil War
- Timeline of the Syrian Civil War
