= Reactions to the 2019 Turkish offensive into north-eastern Syria =

The following is a list of reactions to the 2019 Turkish offensive into north-eastern Syria.

== Reactions in Turkey ==
A day prior to the operation, all Turkish opposition parties except the Peoples' Democratic Party (HDP) voted to extend the military's mandate on Syria. Opposition party leaders Meral Akşener (Good Party), Kemal Kılıçdaroğlu (Republican People's Party), and Temel Karamollaoğlu (Felicity Party), as well as the junior government partner, Nationalist Movement Party leader Devlet Bahçeli, expressed their support for the military operation. Akşener, Kılıçdaroğlu, and Bahçeli were directly informed of the operation by Turkish President Recep Erdoğan immediately after its launch. On 14 October, Turkish Minister of National Defence Hulusi Akar visited the opposition parties and informed them about the ongoing operation.

After the start of the operation, the opposition CHP began to criticize its implementation. A CHP spokesman lambasted Erdogan for "driving [Turkey] to the Middle East swamp" while CHP leader Kemal Kılıçdaroğlu criticized the government for uniting the world against it with an "adventurous foreign policy."

Meanwhile, on 15 October Good Party leader Meral Akşener urged the government to make peace with Syria through dialogue with Bashar al-Assad.

The HDP condemned the operation from the start, calling it an "extremely dangerous and wrong step" and stating that "Turkey is being dragged into a dangerous and deep trap".

Erdoğan rejected international criticism and said referring to the Saudi Arabian-led intervention in Yemen: "Let me start with Saudi Arabia. Look in the mirror first. ... Did tens of thousands of people not die in Yemen?" He also called Egypt's President Abdel Fattah el-Sisi a "democracy killer" after the Egyptian Foreign Ministry called the offensive an "invasion."

=== Religious communities and organisations ===
- Turkey's Jewish Community announced its support to the operation on a Twitter post. They stated: "We wish success in the fight against terror towards our state and our glorious army".
- The Grand Lodge of Free and Accepted Masons of Turkey said: "As The Grand Lodge of Free and Accepted Masons of Turkey, we wish that the Turkish Armed Forces will be successful in the Operation Peace Spring in north-eastern Syria, against the terrorist elements that threaten the survival of our country. And we hope that our hero soldiers will return to our country successfully." in a written statement.
- On 20 October 2019, representatives of the Syriac Catholic Foundation, Syriac Catholic Church, Syriac Orthodox Church, Fener Greek Orthodox Patriarchate, Armenian Patriarchate of Turkey, Chaldean Catholic community, and the Jewish community gathered in Mor Hananyo Monastery in a religious ceremony to support Operation Peace Spring.

== Reactions in Syria ==
- Syria The Syrian government strongly condemned the Turkish attack, dubbing it a "disgraceful breach of international law and UN resolutions that respect Syria’s sovereignty and territorial integrity".
- A Syrian Democratic Forces spokesman told Al-Jazeera regarding the offensive, "Threats made by Turkey to attack the area is not something new, they have constantly done it for years. We as Syrian Democratic Forces take the matter into account and are fully prepared to fiercely respond to any imminent attack on Syrian soil."
  - The Northern Democratic Brigade denounced the invasion as an attempt by Turkey to establish the "terrorist" Muslim Brotherhood as a ruling force in northern Syria.
- Syrian opposition
    - The Syrian Turkmen Assembly stated: "As a result of the extermination and exile movement of the terrorist organization, the Turkmen presence in the east of the Euphrates had suffered a severe wound." The statement also underlined that the operation was a "mandatory and legitimate intervention".
  - Ha'yat Tahrir al-Sham's leader, Ahmed al-Sharaa had previously stated prior to the start of the offensive that he would support a Turkish military operation in northern Syria against the Kurdistan Workers Party (PKK), and that they were enemies of the Syrian revolution. However, HTS fighters have said they are concerned that the operation could enable the release of Islamic State of Iraq and the Levant fighters and their families from SDF detention camps and prisons, and that they would flee to HTS-held areas in Idlib and carry out attacks.
  - Influential jihadist cleric Abu Anas al-Masri, based in Idlib Governorate, argued that the Turkish operation was to the overall benefit of the rebels in Idlib, because it would take Turkey's attention away from the region, weaken American influence in the Middle East, and result in two anti-jihadist factions (Turkey and the SDF) harming each other. He objected to rebels in Idlib assisting the offensive, as he views Erdogan as an apostate and an enemy of the Syrian people.

=== Religious communities and organisations ===
- Melkite Greek Catholic Archeparchy of Aleppo – Jean-Clément Jeanbart, the Greek-Melkite Archbishop of Aleppo, said that the Turkish offensive is "another source of violence we would rather have done without." Jeanbart said this is concerning because it will in fact lead to the creation of an extraterritorial pocket within another nation.

== International reactions ==
=== Supranational ===
- Arab League – Secretary-General Ahmed Aboul Gheit called the offensive a "blatant violation of Syria's sovereignty". The Arab League met in Cairo on 12 October 2019 to discuss Turkey's actions. Upon meeting, its member states voted to condemn the Turkish offensive, dubbing it both an 'invasion' and an 'aggression' against an Arab state, adding that the organization saw it as a violation of international law, which they deemed ought to attract international rejection.
- European Union – On 8 October 2019, European Commissioner for migration Dimitris Avramopoulos said that "the European Union remains committed to the unity, sovereignty and territorial integrity of the Syrian state". High Representative Federica Mogherini issued a declaration on behalf of the EU on 9 October 2019 stating that "In light of the Turkish military operation in north-east Syria, the EU reaffirms that a sustainable solution to the Syrian conflict cannot be achieved militarily. The EU calls upon Turkey to cease the unilateral military action." President of the European Council Donald Tusk reprimanded Turkish President Tayyip Erdogan for threatening to send millions of Syrian refugees to Europe and blasted the Turkish operation in northern Syria as destabilizing the region, which should halt. On the 11th, the EU began discussing on possible sanctions and arms embargoes of Turkey. On 14 October, EU member states unanimously adopted a resolution which "condemned in strong terms" the Turkish military offensive and committed to curb weapons exports to Turkey by committing to "strong national export positions", but stopped short of enforcing a mandatory EU-wide weapons embargo on Turkey, so as to "avoid placing an EU framework on NATO members".
- NATO – Secretary General Jens Stoltenberg said that Turkey is "at the forefront of the crisis and has legitimate security concerns", having suffered terrorist attacks and hosting millions of refugees. He added that NATO was informed by Turkish authorities about the ongoing operations in Northern Syria. He further stated that it was "important to avoid actions that may further destabilise the region, escalate tensions, and cause more human suffering." He called on Turkey to "act with restraint" and said that the gains made against ISIS should not be jeopardized.
- Turkic Council – In a joint declaration by its 5-member (Azerbaijan, Kazakhstan, Kyrgyzstan, Turkey, Uzbekistan) and 2 observer states (Hungary and Turkmenistan), Turkic Council voiced a strong support to the operation. "The leaders express their hope and belief that Turkey’s Operation Peace Spring will contribute to fighting terrorism, ensuring territorial integrity of Syria, liberating local Syrians from the oppression of terrorists and creating conditions for the safe and voluntary return of displaced Syrians to their homeland" was said in the declaration on the 7th summit of Turkic Council.
- United Nations – The UN cautioned regarding the offensive calling for the protection of civilians. Panos Moumtzis, the UN's Regional Humanitarian Coordinator for Syria, commented saying "Any (military) operation that takes place at the moment has to take into account to ensure that we don’t see any further displacement." António Guterres, Secretary-General of the UN expressed his "deep concern" at the spiralling violence in Syria a day after Turkey launched an offensive in Kurdish-controlled areas. He said any solution to the conflict needed to respect the sovereignty of the territory and the unity of Syria.
  - United Nations Security Council: Russia and the United States vetoed a statement introduced by five European countries (Belgium, France, Germany, Poland and the United Kingdom) condemning Turkey's actions in Syria during a closed-door meeting. The statement has also called on Turkey "to cease the unilateral military action", claiming that the operation threatens progress against the Islamic State.

=== UN-member states ===
International reactions to Turkey's 2019 operation in northern Syria.; Turkey; Condemned and implemented sanctions or export restrictions; Condemned or rejected; Urged Turkey to halt or 'show restraint'; Supported; Vocal neutrality, ambiguous statement or general concern

- Algeria – Algeria expressed its rejection to the Turkish military operation in northern Syria and reaffirmed its "full" support for the sovereignty and territorial integrity of Syria.
- Armenia – The Ministry of Foreign Affairs has published a statement which condemns "the military invasion by Turkey in north-east Syria, which would lead to deterioration of regional security, losses among civilians, mass displacement and eventually to a new humanitarian crisis. The plight of ethnic and religious minorities is of particular concern. This military invasion also creates an imminent threat of identity based grave and massive violations of human rights". Prime Minister Nikol Pashinyan said during Cabinet meeting, that Armenia condemns the invasion of the Turkish armed forces in Syria.
- Austria - Despite initially avoiding to make a statement on the offensive, Austria decided to back an arms embargo against Turkey on 14 October, following the adoption of the EU's common position.
- Australia – Prime Minister Scott Morrison stated that he was concerned for the safety of the Kurds living in the region and also feared that the offensive could result in a resurgence of ISIS. He condemned Turkey for the invasion.
- Azerbaijan – The Ministry of Foreign Affairs stated on a written statement that 2019 Turkish offensive into north-eastern Syria will serve to eliminate perceived the terror risks by the Azerbaijan government, return of refugees to their homes, solution of the humanitarian problems and providing peace and stability within the territorial integrity of Syria.
- Bahrain – The Ministry of Foreign Affairs of the Kingdom of Bahrain strongly condemned the military attack by Turkey on areas in northeast of Syria.
- Belgium – The Belgian government condemned the Turkish military operation and called on Turkey to halt it immediately. It further added that it saw the Turkish military intervention as threatening the 'fragile political process' in Syria, as well as regional stability. Belgium later decided to implement an arms embargo against Turkey.
- Bulgaria – Bulgarian Prime Minister Boyko Borisov initially urged Brussels to stop its criticism of Turkey, adding that "Bulgaria's relations with Turkey are good-neighbourly." Several days later on October 15, Bulgaria called for an end to the operation in favour of a diplomatic solution.
- Canada – On 9 October 2019, Canadian Minister of Foreign Affairs Chrystia Freeland stated on Twitter that Canada "firmly condemns Turkey’s military incursion into Syria today." Later, Canada suspended new arms sales to Turkey.
- China – China's Foreign Ministry spokesperson stated that China held "Syria's sovereignty, independence and territorial integrity must be respected and upheld", noted that several sides had "expressed concerns" over Turkey's military operation and urged Turkey to "exercise restraint".
- Cuba – Cuba's ambassador in Damascus condemned the Turkish offensive, stating that his country opposes "any aggression which targets sovereignty, independence and territorial integrity of Syria".
- Cyprus – The Cypriot Ministry of Foreign Affairs strongly condemned the invasion of Syria, stating that it is a "gross violation of international law" and urged from Turkey to immediately cease all military activities.
- Czech Republic – Czech Foreign Minister Tomáš Petříček stated his opposition to the Turkish operation and argued that it would worsen the situation of civilians and refugees. The Czech Republic later implemented export restrictions on Turkey by ordering the suspension of all export licenses for all military products destined for the nation.
- Denmark – Minister of Foreign Affairs Jeppe Kofod tweeted that he is "deeply concerned about" the situation and believed the offensive to be "a regrettable and wrong decision" on Turkey's part, fearing that it could "have serious consequences for civilians and the fight against ISIL." On 10 October, Denmark condemned the operation.
- Egypt – Egypt's Foreign Ministry condemned Turkey's offensive. It also called for the UN Security Council to halt "any attempts to occupy Syrian territories" or "change the demographics in northern Syria". In addition, it called for an emergency meeting of the Arab League.
- Estonia – Foreign Minister Urmas Reinsalu stated that all diplomatic channels must be used to influence Turkey on finding a political solution.
- Finland – Finland condemned Turkey's attack on Syria and froze arms export licenses to Turkey.
- France – Foreign Minister Jean-Yves Le Drian condemned the unilateral Turkish operation in northeast Syria on 9 October 2019, and declared "is jeopardising the anti-Islamic State coalition’s security and humanitarian efforts and is a risk for the security of Europeans. It has to end". France and Britain call for Security council meeting. French President Emmanuel Macron warned that Turkey would be responsible for helping Islamic State to re-establish a Caliphate in Syria as he called on Turkey to stop its military offensive against Kurdish forces the north of Syria. France later implemented export restrictions on arms exports to Turkey and expressed its intention to back an EU-wide weapons embargo on the nation.
- Georgia – Georgian Foreign Minister David Zalkaliani declared, "We recognize the interest of our strategic partner Turkey in ensuring a secure environment along its borders. At the same time, we are interested in reaching an agreement between our two main strategic partners—Turkey and the United States—as this will largely provide security in the region."
- Germany – Minister for Foreign Affairs Heiko Maas condemned the offensive "in the strongest possible terms" and warned that the offensive would cause more destabilization in the region and could cause ISIS to grow. Germany has banned weapons exports to Turkey in response to the invasion
- Greece – Minister for Foreign Affairs Nikos Dendias condemned Turkey's invasion of Syria, stating that "Turkey is making a big mistake". Furthermore, about Turkey's plans for the creation of a safe zone in Northern Syria for the immigrants to be resettled, at the expense of the local Kurdish population he stated that it "is illegal since the resettlement of immigrants must comply with some basic principles: to be voluntary and dignified. [...] Therefore, what Turkey does, goes against human rights". Also, the United Nations Regional Humanitarian Coordinator for the Syrian Crisis, Panos Moumtzis from Greece, correlated the Turkish offensive against the Kurds, with the Srebrenica genocide, prompting strong reactions from Ankara.
- Hungary – Hungary vetoed an attempt by the EU member states to unanimously issue a warning against the operation citing "countries have rights to protect their borders". However, Hungary finally accepted the EU declaration condemning the Turkish military intervention in Syria, which was later explained by Hungarian Minister of Foreign Affairs Péter Szijjártó as a move to "not disrupt the unity of the Visegrád Group". Later, Hungarian FM Szijjártó announced its support and commitment for Turkey's plans to "resettle 4 million refugees living in Turkey to their home country". Szijjártó concluded in support that "the Syrian offensive is a Hungarian national interest", Hungary has promised to smooth Turkey-European Union integration and resume talks when in charge.
- Iceland – Iceland strongly condemned 'the Turkish move against Kurds' and called on Turkey to end the operation.
- India – India condemned Turkey for its unilateral military move, claiming it would undermine regional stability and the fight against terrorism. India also called upon Turkey to exercise restraint and respect the sovereignty and territorial integrity of Syria.
- Iran – Foreign minister Mohammad Javad Zarif has voiced opposition to the offensive viewing it as a violation of Syria's sovereignty. However regarding the US withdrawal from Syria Zarif commented saying the US was an "irrelevant occupier in Syria", and said that Iran would be willing to mediate tensions between Syria and Turkey. In addition, Iran's parliamentary speaker Ali Larijani cancelled his scheduled trip to Turkey.
- Iraq – President Barham Salih condemned the operation, stating that "Turkey’s military incursion into Syria is a grave escalation; will cause untold humanitarian suffering, empower terrorist groups. The world must unite to avert a catastrophe, promote political resolution to the rights of all Syrians, including Kurds, to peace, dignity & security".
- Ireland – Ireland stated that unilateral military action cannot be condoned and was deeply troubled by the Turkish operation.
- Israel – Prime Minister Benjamin Netanyahu condemned the operation and warned against ethnic cleansing of Kurds by Turkey and its proxies, and stated that "Israel is prepared to extend humanitarian assistance to the gallant Kurdish people."
- Italy – Prime Minister Giuseppe Conte stated that the offensive puts the region's civilians and stability in jeopardy. Italian Foreign Minister Luigi Di Maio condemned the operation, declaring that the offensive against Kurdish forces in Syria is "unacceptable" and calling for an immediate end to the fighting. Italy joined an arms embargo against Turkey, despite previously being Turkey's primary EU weapons supplier.
- Japan – Foreign minister, Toshimitsu Motegi, said in a statement: "Japan is deeply concerned that the latest military operation would make the settlement of Syrian crisis more difficult and cause further deterioration of the humanitarian situation. Japan once again underscores its position that the Syrian crisis cannot be solved by any military means."
- Jordan – Jordan urged Turkey to halt the offensive and to solve all issues diplomatically. Jordan's Foreign Minister later stated that the Kingdom condemned what he termed the 'Turkish aggression on Syria'.
- Kuwait – Kuwait stated that it was concerned about how the offensive might negatively affect the peacefulness and stability of the region and called for restraint.
- Latvia – Latvian Foreign Minister Edgars Rinkēvičs described the operation as 'disturbing' and urged Turkey to cease its operation to pursue a political solution.
- Lebanon – Lebanon condemned the operation and called on Turkey to rethink its move.
- Libya – Libya's UN-recognized government refused to sign an Arab League memorandum condemning the military operation in Syria along with Qatar.
- Liechtenstein – As a response to the Turkish offensive, Liechtenstein stated that 'unchecked interpretations' of Article 51 of the United Nations undermined security and peace.
- Lithuania – Lithuanian Foreign Minister Linas Linkevicius described the operation as 'worrying' and urged Turkey to find a political solution.
- Luxembourg – Luxembourg condemned the operation and called on Turkey to cease its actions.
- Netherlands – Minister of Foreign Affairs Stef Blok tweeted that Turkey should not "follow the path it has chosen", noting that "[t]he operation can trigger new refugee flows and harm the fight against IS and stability in the region." On 10 October, a large majority of Dutch MPs backed the introduction of sanctions against Turkey.
- New Zealand – New Zealand stated that they were deeply concerned by the situation and that Turkey's offensive caused further instability and aggravated the humanitarian situation in North-east Syria. Moreover, both parties were urged to show restraint.
- Norway – Norway called on Turkey to end the operation and to respect international law As a precautionary measure, Norway suspended all new deliveries of military hardware to Turkey, a fellow member of NATO, making this the first such action by an alliance country. Norwegian Foreign Minister Ine Eriksen Søreide also said that Norway is also reviewing all valid licenses for military and multi-use military export licenses in Turkey.
- Pakistan – Spokesman for Foreign Ministry has welcomed the operation, and said "We appreciate Turkey’s positive role in finding a viable political solution to the conflict in Syria. We also acknowledge Turkey’s humanitarian efforts by graciously hosting over 3.5 million Syrian refugees. We recognize Turkey’s legitimate security concerns in the region." Also added that Pakistan and Turkey were "a victim of terrorism". On 11 October, Prime Minister Imran Khan telephoned Turkish President Recep Tayyip Erdogan to express solidarity and support for Turkey its ongoing military operation in Syria during the conversation Khan told the Turkish president that "Pakistan fully understands Turkey’s concerns relating to terrorism" a statement issued by the Prime Minister's Office.
- Palestine - Fatah official Mohammad Dahlan condemned the operation, saying "with the most powerful words, we condemn the Turkish military invasion into the brotherly Arab land of Syria under false pretexts."
- Poland – Poland stated that they hoped the operation would end as soon as possible and feared that the operation would deteriorate the humanitarian situation in the region. Poland later also noted that it saw any attempts at a demographic change as unacceptable and urged Turkey to cease the offensive.
- Qatar – Qatar announced its support on Turkish military operation.
- Russia – President Vladimir Putin initially expressed comparative neutrality, stating that Turkey has a right to defend itself, but called upon foreign militaries with what he described as an illegal presence in Syria to leave. On 15 October, Putin declared a much harsher stance, denouncing the Turkish invasion as 'unacceptable' and deploying Russian troops to the frontline. On 13 November, Russian Foreign Minister Sergey Lavrov said that US pushed Gulf countries to finance the creation of a quasi-state on the Eastern Euphrates.
- San Marino – At the 141st Assembly of the Inter-Parliamentary Union in Belgrade, San Marino voted for the French proposal urging for an end to the offensive.
- Saudi Arabia – The government of Saudi Arabia condemned Turkey's actions in a statement, saying that the operation "has negative repercussions on the security and stability of the region". The Saudi foreign ministry also claimed that the offensive is a violation of Syria's unity, independence and sovereignty.
- Slovenia – Slovenia stated that it is deeply concerned and urged Turkey cease the operation and to find a political solution.
- Sweden – Sweden stated that the Turkish operation was a threat to the region and the Kurdish efforts against ISIS. On 10 October, Sweden condemned the Turkish offensive as a violation of international law and as destabilizing the situation on the ground, risking grave humanitarian consequences and calling on the UN Security Council to handle the issue. Sweden later implemented an arms export embargo on Turkey and stated its plan to push for an EU-wide weapons embargo as well.
- Switzerland – Switzerland condemned the Turkish intervention and called their actions as violation of international law.
- Spain - Despite initial hesitation, Spain decided to back an arms embargo on Turkey on 14 October.
- Tunisia – Tunisia has called for "an immediate halt to Turkey's military operations in northeast Syria to prevent further bloodshed and protect the sovereignty, unity and territorial integrity of Syria."
- Ukraine – Ukraine's Foreign ministry stated that it was following the developments in Northeast Syria and urged Turkey to "adopt the decisions that will contribute to resolving the security and humanitarian problems within the international legal framework".
- United Arab Emirates – The United Arab Emirates stated that it condemns the Turkish interference and offensive in Syria in the strongest terms.
- United Kingdom – In a telephone call with US President Donald Trump, Prime Minister Boris Johnson described the offensive as an "invasion" and expressed "serious concern". Foreign Secretary Dominic Raab said: "I have serious concerns about the unilateral military action that Turkey has taken. This risks destabilising the region, exacerbating humanitarian suffering, and undermining the progress made against Daesh which should be our collective focus." The UK's government later decided to cancel all export licenses for military equipment, as well as to suspend the issuing of new export licenses, until such a time as the arms export policy vis-a-vis Turkey underwent a "review".
- United States – President Donald Trump stated that "the United States does not endorse this attack and has made it clear to Turkey that this operation is a bad idea." Trump has threatened to devastate the economy of Turkey if they do "anything that I, in my great and unmatched wisdom, consider to be off limits". However, Trump defended his decision to withdraw American troops, arguing that the Kurds "didn't help us in the Second World War, they didn't help us with Normandy as an example". Trump also stated: "Alliances are very easy. But our alliances have taken advantage of us". Secretary of State Mike Pompeo denied that the United States had given a 'green light' for Turkey to attack the Kurds. However, Pompeo defended the Turkish military action, stating that Turkey has a "legitimate security concern" with "a terrorist threat to their south". Senator Lindsey Graham warned that he would "introduce bipartisan sanctions against Turkey if they invade Syria". He said he would also "call for their suspension from NATO if they attack Kurdish forces who assisted the United States in the destruction of the ISIS Caliphate". Bipartisan legislation has been introduced in the Senate to sanction Turkey, as well as in the House of Representatives. Late on the 14th, the US government declared "very strong" sanctions against the Turkish ministries of defense, interior and energy, a move that US Treasury Secretary Mnuchin said would have a "severe" impact on the Turkish economy. The US statement delivered by Mnuchin and Vice President Pence denounced the Turkish government for "endangering innocent civilians, and destabilizing the region, including undermining the campaign to defeat ISIS", said that the US had given no "green light" to a full-on Turkish invasion, and warned that sanctions would continue and worsen until Turkey embraces an immediate ceasefire". On Monday, it was reported by The New York Times and The Guardian that NATO officials were discussing a unilateral removal of the US nuclear arsenal stationed at Incirlik.

=== De facto states ===
- Northern Cyprus – The President of Northern Cyprus, Mustafa Akıncı, opposed Turkey's operation in Syria, stating that "Although Turkey's intervention at the time was what we called the 'Peace Operation,' it was a war in which blood was shed. And now, even though we call it the 'Peace Spring,' it is not spilling water, but blood. That is why my biggest wish is for dialogue and diplomacy to be initiated as soon as possible." drawing condemnation from both the Turkey's President Tayyip Erdogan and Vice President Fuat Oktay, with the later stating that: "I condemn Akıncı who ignores the fact that Operation Peace Spring is taking place against the bloody terrorist organization PKK/PYD for the stability of region." On the other hand, the Prime Minister of Northern Cyprus Ersin Tatar has showed his support on the operation and said that Cypriot Turks are always on Turkey's side. On 17 October, Foreign Minister and Deputy Prime Minister Kudret Özersay said: "I want to stress once again that my government and nation fully and completely back the Republic of Turkey and its nation on their rightful fight against terrorism. No one doubts that".

=== Regional governments ===
- Flanders – Minister-President Jan Jambon called for Europe to sanction Turkey.
- Kurdistan Region – The autonomous Kurdistan Region of Iraq expressed deep concern and called upon Turkey to "avoid any initiative that would undermine the progress made against ISIS". On 8 October 2019, after a meeting between the KRG's President Nechirvan Barzani and Russia's foreign minister Sergey Lavrov, Barzani called upon Russia to intervene to prevent Turkish forces from entering SDF held areas. However, later in November 2019, Barzani stated that in his view Turkey has no issue with Syrian Kurds but rather only with the PKK.
- Scotland – The First Minister of Scotland, Nicola Sturgeon expressed concerns in the Scottish Parliament saying "I say very clearly and strongly that I and the Scottish Government are deeply concerned about and are strongly opposed to Turkey’s unilateral military action in northern Syria."

=== Organizations ===
- Amnesty International – A statement released by Amnesty International said that military offensive by Turkey in northeast Syria risks devastating humanitarian consequences and a further destabilization of the region. Hostilities will impact & restrict access to humanitarian aid pushing the civilian population to the brink, and criticism of Turkey's military operations and targeting of journalists and social media users with threats of detention and criminal prosecutions is unacceptable. This crackdown violates Turkey's obligations under international human right law.
- Genocide Watch, member and current Coordinator of the Alliance Against Genocide, renewed a genocide alert as all the stages of the genocidal process identified by Gregory Stanton are far advanced, and it stated that Turkey is planning genocide and crimes against humanity in Northeastern Syria. It also noted that 100,000 Christians live in the area that Turkey will invade and Turkey and its predecessor, the Ottoman Empire, have a century old history of genocide against Christians.
- Human Rights Watch – Kenneth Roth, Executive Director at Human Rights Watch said that Turkey and its allies have previously unlawfully killed, arbitrarily arrested, and wrongfully displaced civilians. This military operation risks repeating these abuses unless they take steps now. A report by HRW also stated that Turkey's plan to create a 32-kilometer "safe zone" in Syria where it could relocate one million Syrian refugees is woefully misguided, dangerous and bound to fail. Turkey's military operations in northeast Syria could also displace civilians currently living there and put in danger any refugees moved into the zone.
- International Rescue Committee – IRC stated that it is deeply concerned about the lives of the 2 million civilians at risk - many of whom have already survived ISIS brutality and multiple displacements. A military offensive by Turkey could displace 300,000 people and sever life-saving humanitarian services, including the IRC's. Even a limited military initiative could see 60,000 displaced, the majority of whom were already in dire humanitarian need.
- Médecins Sans Frontières – Robert Onus, MSF Emergency Manager for Syria said "This escalation can only exacerbate the trauma that the people of Syria have already endured through years of war and of living in precarious conditions." The Turkish military campaign in northeast Syria has displaced civilians and led to the closure of some main hospitals there, including a main MSF-supported hospital in the Syrian border town of Tell Abyad, the medical charity Doctors Without Borders (MSF) said.

=== Financial markets ===
The Turkish lira weakened to 5.88 against dollar on 10 October as investors fretted about negative international reaction to the offensive. Turkey's BIST100 Index was down 0.64% On 14 October, BIST100 Index was down by 5 percent. Although on 15 October, Turkish lira raised against dollar and BIST100 gained 1.71% after Trump administration announced sanctions on Turkey. Analysts describe the sanctions as "relatively light" and "window dressing". The Turkish lira firmed to 5.75 against the dollar on 18 October after the ceasefire deal with the US where as BIST100 Index was up 3.82%.

On the other hand, Brent crude was up 22 cents at $58.44 a barrel, and U.S. West Texas Intermediate crude was at $52.59, down 4 cents.
