= Tal-al ward =

Village in Syria

Tal-Al ward is a small village in Syria, that has seen fighting in the Syrian Civil War and Turkish Offensive into North-East Syria.
