= 2019 Turkish offensive into north-eastern Syria order of battle =

This is the order of battle for the 2019 Turkish offensive into north-eastern Syria, codenamed "Operation Peace Spring" by Turkey. The pro-Turkish forces, including the Syrian National Army, are opposed by the armed forces of the NES, including the Syrian Democratic Forces.

== Turkey and allied forces ==
- Turkey
  - Turkish Armed Forces
    - Air Force
    - Land Forces
      - 1st Army
        - 7th Commando Brigade
      - 2nd Army
        - 6th Corps
          - 5th Armored Brigade
          - 11th Commando Brigade
        - 8th Corps
          - 4th Commando Brigade
  - General Directorate of Security
    - Police Special Operation Department
  - National Intelligence Organization (MİT)
- Syrian Interim Government
  - Syrian National Army
    - First Legion
      - Ahrar al-Sharqiya
        - Badr Martyrs' Battalion
      - Jaysh al-Nukhba
        - Azadî Battalion
      - Sultan Suleiman Shah Brigade
      - 20th Division
      - Jaysh al-Sharqiya
    - Second Legion
      - Sultan Murad Division
      - (Syrian opposition) Hamza Division
        - Kurdish Falcons Brigade
      - Al-Moutasem Brigade
        - Men of War Brigade
      - Jaysh al-Islam
    - Third Legion
      - (Syrian opposition) Levant Front
        - Northern Storm Brigade
      - (Syrian opposition) Glory Corps
        - Nour al-Din al-Zenki Movement remnants
      - Force 55
    - Fourth Legion
      - Sham Legion
    - Fifth Legion
      - Ahrar al-Sham
      - Jaysh al-Ahrar
      - (Syrian opposition) Suqour al-Sham Brigades
    - Other SNA factions
      - (Syrian opposition) Jaysh al-Nasr
      - Anwar al-Hak Brigade
      - Mimati battalion

== SDF and allied forces ==
- Rojava (Autonomous Administration of North and East Syria)
  - Syrian Democratic Forces (SDF)
    - People's Protection Units (YPG)
    - Women's Protection Units (YPJ)
    - Syriac Military Council (MFS)
      - Bethnahrain Women's Protection Forces
    - Northern Democratic Brigade
    - Martyr Nubar Ozanyan Brigade
    - Assyrian Forces
      - Khabour Guards
    - SDF military councils
      - Serê Kaniyê Military Council
        - Liwa al-Tahrir
        - Army of Revolutionaries‌
          - Kurdish Front
        - Thuwar Tal Abyad
        - Annaba Clan Volunteers
      - Manbij Military Council
      - Jarabulus Military Council
      - Tal Abyad Military Council
      - Qamishli Military Council
      - Raqqa Military Council
      - Hasakah Military Council
      - Al-Shaddadi Military Council
    - Military Discipline Units
  - Rojava security forces
    - Civilian Defense Force (HPC)
    - Self-Defence Forces (HXP)
    - Anti-Terror Forces (HAT)

[...] the Syrian regime's military deployments to northeast Syria have largely relied on sending one or two battalions from nearly two dozen divisions and regiments. [...] In all likelihood, this is driven by a combination of two factors: there are few to no full brigades available to deploy at this time [and] the SAA overwhelming deploys units within specific geographic boundaries.

— Gregory Waters, Middle East Institute researcher
- Syria (Ba'athist regime)
  - Syrian Arab Armed Forces
    - Syrian Army
      - Manbij Front
        - Republican Guard
          - 104th Brigade
          - 106th Brigade
          - 100th Artillery Regiment
      - 1st Division
          - 68th Brigade
            - 282nd Battalion
      - Kobani Front
        - Republican Guard
          - 30th Division
          - 105th Brigade
        - 1st Division
          - 57th Brigade
            - 846th Battalion
        - Border Guards
          - 12th Regiment
      - Ain Issa/Raqqa Front
        - 5th Corps
          - 5th Brigade
          - 7th Brigade
            - 3rd Battalion
          - 148th Regiment
            - 2nd Battalion
          - 103rd Artillery
        - Republican Guard
          - 104th Brigade
            - 476th Battalion
      - Ras al-Ayn/Tel Tamar Front
        - 17th Division
          - 54th Regiment
            - 23rd Battalion
            - 79th Battalion
          - 121st Artillery Regiment
          - 123rd Artillery Regiment
        - 3rd Division
          - 20th Brigade
            - 38th Battalion
        - 10th Division
          - 62nd Brigade
      - Northeast Hasakah Front
        - Border Guards
          - 5th Regiment

Note: The pro-Syrian government National Defence Forces have an active branch in al-Hasakah Governorate, but have refused to fight alongside the SDF against Turkish-led forces. This is motivated by animosity of local NDF troops toward the SDF, as well as internal leadership disputes that have paralyzed al-Hasakah's NDF. In addition, the General Intelligence Branch 330 is known to be active in northern Syria.

Allied armed groups:

- International Freedom Battalion (IFB)
  - Marxist–Leninist Communist Party (MLKP)
    - Martyr Serkan Battalion
  - United Freedom Forces
    - Marxist–Leninist Armed Propaganda Unit (MLSPB)
    - Revolutionary Communard Party/United Freedom Forces (DKP/BÖG)
  - Revolutionary Communard Party/Birlik (DKP/Birlik)
  - Maoist Communist Party (MKP)
  - Communist Party of Turkey/Marxist–Leninist (TKP-ML)
    - Turkey Workers and Peasants Liberation Army (TİKKO)
  - Communist Labour Party of Turkey/Leninist (TKEP/L)
  - Tekoşîna Anarşîst
