= 2019 Istanbul mayoral election =

Two mayoral elections were held in Istanbul in 2019. The first on 31 March 2019 and the second on 23 June 2019.

- March 2019 Istanbul mayoral election
- June 2019 Istanbul mayoral election
