= Diken (newspaper) =

Independent Turkish news site

- Type: News site
- Format: Online
- Owner(s): Keskin Kalem Yayıncılık ve Tic. A.Ş.
- Publisher: Keskin Kalem Yayıncılık ve Tic. A.Ş.
- Editor-in-chief: Erdal Güven
- Founded: 27 January 2014
- Language: Turkish
- Website: http://www.diken.com.tr/ diken.com.tr

Diken is an online Turkish news site edited by Erdal Güven. The site was first launched on 27 January 2014. Its founder Harun Simavi is the grandson of Sedat Simavi.

Simavi described Diken's mission thus: "To be a thorn in the media that's asked to portray our country as a rose garden, and to defend our democracy, basic freedoms, and secularism. And while carrying out this mission, to bring the profession of journalism the dignity and honor that it deserves."

Contributing writers at the newspaper include Murat Sevinç, Levent Gültekin, Hürrem Sönmez, Mustafa Dağıstanlı, Azime Acar, Yaman Akdeniz, Dağhan Irak, İhsan Dağı, Bahadır Kaynak

== Awards ==
- 2014 Yeşil Düşünce Derneği Interactivists of the Year Awards - Internet Newspaper of the Year
- 2021 - Sedat Simavi Journalism, News of the Year
