= Abyad =

Abyad, also transliterated abiad, is an Arabic word meaning 'white'. It may refer to:

== Places ==
- Abu al Abyad (formerly Abu al Jirab), an island of the United Arab Emirates
- Hajar Abyad, a village in northern Syria
- Jeb Abyad-Byud, a Syrian village
- An Nīl al Abyaḑ, the Arabic name of the White Nile, river in Africa
- An Nil al Abyad, the Arabic name of the Sudan state of White Nile
- Ras al-Abyad/Ras ben Sakka, a cape in Tunisia, the northernmost point of the African continent
- Tell Abyad, a town in northern Syria
  - Tell Abyad District, in Syria with Tell Abyad as its administrative centre
  - Tell Abyad Subdistrict, in Syria with Tell Abyad as its administrative centre
- Tell Sabi Abyad, an archaeological site in northern Syria
- Wadi al-Abyad or al-Ubayyid, a wadi (valley) in Iraq
- Wadi Al Abyadh, a valley in Oman

== Tell Abyad-related military events ==
- Battle of Tell Abyad (2013)
- Tell Abyad offensive (2015)
- Battle of Tell Abyad (2016)
- Battle of Tell Abyad (2019)

== Other ==
- Abyad wa Aswad (lit. 'Black and White'), an Arabic political culture magazine published in Damascus

== See also ==
- White Mosque (disambiguation) (Arabic: Masjid al-Abyad)
