= Suluk =

Suluk may refer to:

- Su'luk, an Arabic brigand-poet
- Something of, from, or related to Sulu
  - Suluk language, or Tausug language, an Austronesian language spoken by the Suluk people
  - Suluk people, or Tausūg people, an ethnic group of the Philippines, Malaysia and Indonesia

== Places ==
- Suluk, Syria, a town in Raqqa Governorate, Syria
- Solok, a city in West Sumatra, Indonesia
- Suluq, a town in Benghazi District, Libya

== People ==
- Suluk (Türgesh khagan) (died 738), Turkic tribe leader
- Suluk Mehmed Reis, or Mahomet Sirocco (1525–1571), Ottoman Bey of Alexandria
- Thomas Suluk (born 1950), Canadian politician
- Donald Suluk (born c. 1925), Inuit religious figure

== Other uses ==
- Suluk Subdistrict, a subdistrict in Raqqa Governorate, Syria
- Houtat Sulūk, a canyon in Raqqa Governorate, Syria
- Trechus suluk, a species of ground beetle
