= Timeline of the Syrian civil war (September–December 2012) =

The following is a timeline of the Syrian civil war from September to December 2012. Information about aggregated casualty counts is found at Casualties of the Syrian Civil War.

== September 2012 ==
=== 3 September ===
- By the end of the day, the LCC reported over 250 people had been killed, over 60 in the Aleppo province and over 60 in the Daraa province due to bombardment by warplanes.

=== 4 September ===
- By the end of the day, the LCC reported 155 people were killed, including 80 in the Damascus suburbs.

=== 5 September ===
- Syrian activists reported heavy fighting between Rebel forces and the Syrian Army in Aleppo multiple suburbs of Damascus. The Syrian Observatory for Human Rights said 6 bodies had been found in Tadamon showing signs of having been tortured.
- The LCC reported that 260 people were killed by the end of the day, including 115 in Aleppo and 67 in the Damascus suburbs.

=== 6 September ===
- 159 people were killed by the end of the day, according to the LCC, including 88 in the Damascus suburbs.
- The Syrian Army recaptured the town of Tell Shihab from rebels.

=== 7 September ===
- By evening the LCC reported that 140 people were killed, including 44 in the Damascus suburbs and 28 in Aleppo.

Iraqi security and medical officials said a 4-year-old girl was killed, and 4 others injured, in the Iraqi town of al-Qaim, by mortar fire from Abu Kamal, just across the Syrian border. The anti-government Syrian Observatory for Human Rights said Albu Kamal had been being shelled that day.

=== 8 September ===
- The LCC reported 178 people killed across Syria, including 89 in Aleppo.
- On 9 September, The LCC reported 160 killed across Syria, including 40 in the Damascus suburbs.

=== 9 September ===
- A car bomb exploded at the Saad al-Ansari district of Aleppo, targeting al-Hayat hospital near the 7 April Stadium. 32 were killed and at least 64 people were injured as a result of the blast.

=== 11 September ===
- By the end of the day the LCC reported 130 people killed, including 43 in Aleppo and 34 in the Damascus suburbs.

=== 12 September ===
- By the end of the day the LCC reported 173 people killed, including 67 in Aleppo.

=== 13 September ===
- At least 11 people were killed in an airstrike in Aleppo. New UN envoy Lakhdar Brahimi arrives in Damascus.
- By the end of the day the LCC reported 165 people were killed, including 57 in the Damascus suburbs. Al Qaeda urged all Islamists to support the rebellion against the Syrian government.

=== 14 September ===
- Eight Syrians were arrested by the Lebanese Army while travelling in a truck containing a large quantity of weapons.
- Yousef Assad, a high ranking Syrian Air Force officer and relative of Syrian President Bashar al-Assad, announced his defection to the opposition with an online video.
- By the end of the day the LCC reported 165 people killed across Syria, including 66 in the Damascus suburbs.

=== 15 September ===
- By the end of the day the LCC reported 164 civilians killed across Syria, including 67 in the Damascus suburbs.

=== 16 September ===
- A German Der Spiegel reported that Syria has tested ordnance capable of carrying chemical weapons in desert near Aleppo at the end of August.
- Iran's Revolutionary Guards commander Mohammad Ali Jafari admits that Iran's elite forces are operating in Syria.
- The LCC reported 167 civilians killed, including 60 in the Damascus suburbs and 50 in Aleppo.

=== 17 September ===
- By the end of the day the LCC reported 147 civilians killed, including 50 in the Damascus suburbs.

=== 18 September ===
- By the end of the day the LCC reported 160 civilians killed, including 67 in the Damascus suburbs.

=== 19 September ===
- Opposition forces seized a border crossing between Syria and Turkey in Tal Abyad District, Raqqa Governorate.
- By the end of the day the LCC reported 150 civilians killed, including 72 in the Damascus suburbs.

=== 20 September ===
- By the end of the day, over 250 civilians were killed, including over 71 in Raqqa when a warplane bombed a petrol station, according to the LCC.
- A Syrian Airbus A320 collides with a Syrian Mil Mi-17 helicopter which results in the helicopter crashes and the tail of the passengerplane being damaged.

=== 21 September ===
- 98 civilians were reported dead; including 34 in the Damascus Countryside. 17 rebels were slain; with 5 dead in Aleppo including a battalion leader. 32 Syrian soldiers were killed; including a colonel; according to SOHR.
- By evening 117 civilians were killed, including 48 in the Damascus suburbs, according to LCC.
- A Syrian Air Force jet was reported shot down over the northern Syrian town of Atarib in the Idlib province.

=== 22 September ===
- Activists reported that over 180 people were killed in Syria, mostly in the Damascus suburbs and Aleppo. Col. Riad al-Asaad announced on video that the FSA had moved its command centre into an undisclosed location inside Syrian territory from Turkey in light of rebel gains. Andrew Simmons, reporting for Al Jazeera in Akcakale, stated that the FSA is still dependent on Turkish supply lines and that rebels have only taken territory 5 km deep into Syria.
- By the end of the day the LCC reported that 220 civilians were killed, including 66 in the Damascus suburbs.

=== 23 September ===
- Nearly 80 percent of towns and villages along the Turkish border are outside the control of Damascus, according to the Syrian Observatory for Human Rights.
- By evening 85 civilians were killed, including 22 in the Damascus suburbs, according to the LCC.

=== 24 September ===
- By the end of the day the LCC reported that 123 civilians were killed, including 42 in Aleppo and 37 in the Damascus suburbs.

=== 25 September ===
- By evening the end of the day the LCC reported that 148 civilians were killed, including 44 in the Damascus suburbs.

=== 26 September ===
- 26 September was the single bloodiest day since the beginning of the uprising, up to this point. SOHR reported over 300 deaths; similarly LCC reported over 300 civilian deaths, including 162 in the Damascus suburbs, among which were 107 in a massacre in Thiabieh.
- The Press TV correspondent Maya Nasser was killed by sniper fire while covering from the scene of twin bomb blasts in Damascus.

=== 27 September ===
Virtual warfare took part in Syria when Syria military send text messages to rebels: "Game over."

- By the end of the day the LCC reported 133 civilians killed, including 35 in the Damascus suburbs.
- SOHR reported the deaths of 108 civilians (including at least 11 children), 14 rebels & 35 soldiers.
- A Kurdish fighter was killed in clashes between the Kurdish Popular Defence Committees & rebels of the Salah al-Din battalion in Hama.

=== 28 September ===
- The United Nations Human Rights Council condemns Syria and extends war crimes inquiry.
- Russia, China and Cuba vote against Arab resolution.
- According to FSA they launch "decisive battle" in Aleppo.
- The LCC reported 167 civilians killed, including 57 in Aleppo.

=== 29 September ===
- The LCC reported 126 civilians killed by evening, including 64 in the Damascus suburbs.

=== 30 September ===
- A militant group fighting President Bashar al-Assad's forces in Syria said in a video posted online on Sunday it had captured five Yemeni army officers sent by their government to help quell the Syrian uprising.
- By the end of the day 154 civilians were killed, including 76 in the Damascus suburbs.

== October 2012 ==
=== 1 October ===
- At least 164 people were killed by the end of the day, including 12 children, according to the opposition Local Coordination Committees. More than 30 of these deaths occurred due to aerial shelling by government forces. 42 people were killed in Idlib, including 30 who were killed in a reported massacre in the town of Salqin, the LCC said. 51 were also killed in and around the capital city of Damascus.

=== 2 October ===
- The LCC reported that 160 civilians were killed by the end of the day, including 54 in the Damascus suburbs.
- A Hezbollah commander, Ali Hussein Nasif, and several other fighters were killed in Syria when opposition forces ambushed their convoy near al-Qusayr. This was confirmed by the group.

=== 3 October ===
- In Aleppo, three suicide car bombs exploded killing 40 and injuring at least 122 people.
- A Syrian mortar bomb killed 5 Turkish civilians in the Akçakale district; Turkey responded with counter-battery fire.
- The LCC reported over 200 civilians killed by the end of the day, including 67 in the Damascus suburbs.

=== 4 October ===
- By the end of the day the LCC reported 120 civilians killed, including 52 in the Damascus suburbs.
- Turkey's parliament approved further military action against Syria after a second artillery exchange across the border.

=== 5 October ===
- Syrian rebels say they captured an air defense base with a cache of missiles outside Damascus. Included what appeared to be part of a surface-air-missile. It is unlikely that rebels have the ability to fire the missile but they might be able to use the explosives to make improvised bombs.
- Turkey moved tanks and anti-aircraft artillery into Akçakale after a third Syrian mortar attack across the border.
- The LCC reported 127 civilians killed, including 36 in Aleppo and 28 in the Damascus suburbs.

=== 6 October ===
- Turkey and Syria exchanged artillery fire across the border for the fourth time.
- Syrian rebels captured the village of Khirbet al-Joz, Jisr al-Shughur District, close to the border with Turkey. The government death toll was significantly higher than that of the rebels'. 40 Army soldiers and 9 rebels were killed.
- The LCC reported 95 civilians and 10 FSA soldiers killed, including 31 people in the Damascus suburbs.

=== 7 October ===
- Syria and Turkey exchanged artillery fire for the fifth consecutive day after Syrian mortar bombs hit a grain plant in Akçakale and an uninhabited area of Altınözü.
- A cousin to Bashar al-Assad, Housam al-Assad has reported been taken hostage by FSA.
- Syrian scholar and political writer Mohammad Nemr al-Madani was killed under torture while in detention at the state security's Branch 215 in Damascus. A former media aide to President Assad said that the president was planning to flee to Russia "after the regime collapses."
- LCC reported 121 civilians killed, including 62 in the Damascus suburbs.
- SOHR reported the deaths of over 93 civilians, at least 41 of which were slain in the Damascus Suburbs. 31 rebels were killed, more than 10 in Homs. 39 soldiers were killed.

=== 8 October ===
- Turkey and Syria exchanged artillery fire for the sixth consecutive day after a Syrian shell landed in Altınözü district.
- LCC reported that 170 civilians were killed by the end of the day, including 40 in Aleppo and 37 in a mass execution in Maarat al Numaan, Idlib.

=== 9 October ===
- Rebels seized the strategic town of Maarrat al-Nu'man, situated on a highway linking Aleppo to Damascus.
- LCC reported that 197 civilians were killed by the end of the day, including 65 in the Damascus suburbs and 53 in Aleppo.

=== 10 October ===
- Rebel forces halted a Syrian Army attempt to recapture the strategic town of Maarrat al-Nu'man. At least 30 rebels and scores of Syrian government forces died in the fighting. Rebels advanced in other areas, taking over 10 towns and villages in the North. Rebels claimed to fully control territory from the Turkish border to 10–20 km inside Syria.
- Turkish Air Force F-16s intercepted a Syrian Air Airbus A320, flight RB442 from Moscow to Damascus, in Turkish airspace and forced it to land at Esenboğa International Airport, suspecting it was carrying Russian-made weapons. Inspectors confiscated military communications equipment and items "thought to be missile parts".
- The LCC reported that by the end of the day 197 civilians were killed.

=== 11 October ===
- 260 people were killed throughout Syria.
- The Syrian military suffered the most casualties since the start of the uprising, with a death toll of 92 soldiers.
- Syrian Revolution General Commission claims that they have destroyed 61 government helicopters and aircraft. The heaviest losses were in August and the majority were destroyed while on the ground during rebel raids.

=== 12 October ===
- By the end of the day over 100 civilians were killed, including 40 in Aleppo.

=== 13 October ===
- By the end of the day the LCC reported 143 civilians killed, including 48 from the Damascus suburbs.

=== 14 October ===
- Government forces have been accused by Human Rights Watch of using Russian-made cluster bombs. They have used such weapons in the past but they are now using them over populated areas and near key battlefields.
- Turkey closes its air space to Syrian civilian flights in response to similar move by Syrian government.
- FSA captured historical town of Azmarin (Coordinates: 36°03′23″N 36°24′02″E) in 3-day battle.
- By the end of the day the LCC reported 220 civilians killed, of which 140 were in the Damascus suburbs, including over 100 bodies found in the local hospital between Moadimya and Darraya.

=== 15 October ===
- The LCC reported 100 civilians killed, including 34 in the Damascus suburbs.

=== 16 October ===
- By the end of the day the LCC reported 134 civilians killed, including 33 in the Damascus suburbs.

=== 17 October ===
- By the end of the day the LCC reported 155 civilians killed, including 48 in the Damascus suburbs.

=== 18 October ===
- Syrian Army jets destroyed two residential buildings and a mosque in the rebel-held town of Maarrat al-Nu'man, According to local Rescue workers the airstrikes had killed at least 44 people.
- The LCC reported 230 civilians killed by the end of the day, including over 53 from Idlib when the Syrian army shelled a mosque in Maarat al Numaan, and 69 in the Damascus suburbs.

=== 19 October ===
- The LCC reported 245 civilians killed, including 86 in Deir ez-Zor, where over 75 bodies were found lying in a cemetery.

=== 20 October ===
- The LCC reported 123 civilians killed, including 67 in the Damascus suburbs.
- The SEO expressed grave concern over the situation in Deiz ez-Zor city, where unrelenting airstrikes and military blockades for 130 days have destroyed 75% of the city and killed over 3,000 people. According to the organization, " on 20 October it was reported that a gruesome massacre of over 80 civilians in Deir ez-Zor was perpetrated by the Assad government in which men, women, and children were tortured, slaughtered, and burned. The massacre took place at the southern edge of the city, where government forces have been staging attacks for months."

=== 21 October ===
- A car bomb has exploded in front of a police station in Damascus killing at least 10 people according to State TV. Syrian Observatory for Human Rights has also reported that 140 people were killed across Syria.
- The LCC reported 135 civilians killed by the end of the day, including 70 in the Damascus suburbs.

=== 22 October ===
- The first Jordanian soldier to die in the conflict was killed by gunfire. The Jordanian government has blamed people trying to illegally cross into Syria from Jordan to join the rebels. Large-scale fighting occurred in Aleppo and the Damascus suburbs.
- The LCC reported 204 civilians killed by the end of the day, including 134 in the Damascus suburbs, among which over 60 bodies were found in Moadamiyah.

=== 23 October ===
- A female Alawite general, Zubaida al-Meeki, who defected to the FSA and set up a training centre for rebels south of Damascus, said that sectarianism is used to distract people from the reality of a popular uprising. Her experience while training opposition fighters was documented in Syrian filmmaker Abo Andans upcoming film, "the southern heartlines".
- The LCC reported 202 civilians killed, including 100 from the Damascus suburbs, among which 50 of them were from Moadamiya.

=== 24 October ===
- The LCC reported 150 civilians killed, including 84 in the Damascus suburbs, among which 30 were field executed in Douma.

=== 25 October ===
- The LCC reported 106 civilians killed, including 36 in the Damascus suburbs.

=== 26 October ===
- The LCC reported 103 civilians killed, including 39 in the Damascus suburbs, they also reported that government forces had violated the first day of the ceasefire some 292 times.

=== 27 October ===
- Syrian rebels clashed with Kurdish militia in Aleppo, leaving 30 dead and some 200 captured. SOHR said the Eid ceasefire had collapsed after a government fighter jet killed 8 people in Damascus. Al-Nusra Front are believed to have launched an attack on a military police compound in Deir ez-Zor. A car bomb was detonated followed by gunfire aimed at those rushing to the scene, 8 were killed.
- The LCC reported 93 civilians killed, including 47 in the Damascus suburbs. Alternatively, the SOHR reported the deaths of over 120 people; 62 civilians (5 children), 25 rebels & at least 36 soldiers.

=== 28 October ===
- The LCC reported 128 civilians killed, including 56 in the Damascus suburbs.

=== 29 October ===
- The LCC reported 115 civilians killed, including 53 in the Damascus suburbs.

=== 30 October ===
- The LCC reported 163 civilians killed, including 72 in the Damascus suburbs. Air strikes leveled areas of Douma, leaving 18 people dead.

=== 31 October ===
- A motorcycle bomb exploded near the Shiite shrine of Sayyida Zeinab, killing 8 and wounding dozens. The site is where the granddaughter of the Prophet Mohammed is buried.
- The LCC reported 121 civilians killed, including 53 in Aleppo and 44 in the Damascus suburbs.

== November 2012 ==
=== 1 November ===
- Syrian rebels killed 28 soldiers in attacks on military checkpoints in northern Idlib province on Thursday, just hours after a wave of bombings hit Damascus and its outskirts, activists said.
- The LCC reported that 149 civilians killed, including 53 in the Damascus suburbs.

=== 2 November ===
- On 2 November, Syrian government forces are said to have left the town of Saraqib. This town is 50 kilometres (31 mi) south-west of Aleppo and is at the junction of the road from the Mediterranean of Latakia and the M5 highway that runs from Damascus to Aleppo. If confirmed, the Syrian government will be forced to resupply its forces in Aleppo using smaller rural roads or by air since it lost Maarrat al-Nu'man on 10 October.
- The LCC reported 182 civilians killed, including 51 in Aleppo and 47 in the Damascus suburbs. The LCC also reported that Government air strikes on the town of Harem in the Idlib area killed 70. Alternatively, the SOHR reported the deaths of over 200; 74 civilians (10 children), 55 rebels (including a defected lieutenant) & 61 soldiers. In addition, 2 were killed due to bombardment in Aleppo, 43 unidentified corpses were found, and dozens were slain due to mutual bombardment in Harem.

=== 3 November ===
- Five rebel units have launched a coordinated attack on the Taftanaz airbase supported by mortars and rocket fire. The attack appears aimed at not raiding the airbase (as they have done previously with others) but to occupy the airbase permanently as to prevent its further use. The base is just 15 kilometres (9.3 mi) from the town of Saraqib, which fell to the rebels less than two days ago.
- Three Syrian tanks also entered the demilitarised zone on the Golan Heights between Syria and Israel, the Syrian forces were in pursuit of rebels while Israel has lodged a protest with the UN.
- The LCC reported 162 civilians killed, including 52 in the Damascus suburbs.

=== 4 November ===
- A car bomb went off underneath the government Labour Union building, wounding 12, two critically. The building is near a major hotel, Dama Rose hotel, and is only 500 metres (1,600 ft) from the army chief of staff's building.
- Rebels have assassinated actor Mohammad Rafe they cited his collaboration with the government as justification for the killing.
- The LCC reported 234 civilians killed, including over 100 in the Damascus suburbs.

=== 5 November ===
- The LCC reported 159 civilians killed, including 72 in Idlib.
- According to opposition activists, 50 government soldiers were killed by a suicide bombing in the village of al-Ziyarah in the Hama Governorate while 20 rebel fighters were killed in an airstrike by the air force in Idlib.

=== 6 November ===
- The LCC reported 156 civilians killed, including 60 in the Damascus suburbs. Alternatively, SOHR reported the deaths of around 205, 10 being unidentified. 119 civilians, 28 rebels & 48 rebels were killed.
- Rebels fired mortars at the presidential palace although missing, the brother of the Syrian speaker of parliament has been assassinated and a judge was killed by a car bomb.

=== 7 November ===
- The LCC reported 168 civilians killed, including 73 in the Damascus suburbs.

=== 8 November ===
- The LCC reported 123 civilians killed, including 47 in the Damascus suburbs.

=== 9 November ===
- The LCC reported 136 civilians killed, including 33 in the Damascus suburbs and 33 in Deir ez-Zor. The FSA captured Ras al-Ain in Hasakah province, with army helicopters and artillery bombarding it afterwards
- President Bashar al-Assad told RT:

- I think that the cost of foreign invasion of Syria, if it happened, would be greater than one that the whole world can afford. Because if there were problems in Syria, particularly as we are the last bastion of secularism, stability and coexistence in the region, it will have a domino impact that will affect the world from the Atlantic Ocean to the Pacific Ocean. And you know its implications on the rest of the world. I do not think that the West is moving in this direction, but if they do, no one can predict what will happen after. I'm not a puppet, and I was not made by the West to go to the West or to any other country. I am Syrian, I was made in Syria and to live and die in Syria."

=== 10 November ===
- On 10 November twin suicide car bomb attacks struck the Syrian Army Officers' Club in Daraa, killing at least 20 soldiers. SANA also reported the attack but did not mention casualties.
- The LCC reported 147 civilians killed, including 47 in the Damascus suburbs.

=== 11 November ===
- Israel has fired warning shots at Syria, after a mortar round hit an Israel Defense Forces outpost, for the first time since the 1973 Yom Kippur War.
- The LCC reported 90 civilians killed, including 35 in the Damascus suburbs.

=== 12 November ===
- Stray mortar shells again hit an IDF post on the Golan Heights, in response Israeli tanks returned fire scoring a 'direct hit' on the source of the fire. Israeli minister of strategic affairs, Moshe Yaalon, stated that he did not believe that these incidents were deliberate but an accidental overspill of fighting from the Syrian civil war. Israeli media reported at least two Syrian casualties.
- The LCC reported 155 people killed, including 50 in the Damascus suburbs. A government helicopter was shot down by rebels at Hamdan Military Airport.

=== 13 November ===
- The LCC reported 172 people killed, including 109 in the Damascus suburbs. The SOHR reported the deaths of around 205 Syrians slain. 99 (including 17 children) civilians were slain, 47 in the Damascus Suburbs. 55 rebels were killed, including a commander in Quneitra & 22 in the Damascus Suburbs. 49 soldiers were killed.

=== 14 November ===
- The LCC reported 100 people killed, including 37 in the Damascus suburbs.

=== 15 November ===
- The LCC reported 130 people killed, including 59 in the Damascus suburbs.
- SOHR reported the deaths of around 141 Syrians. 72 civilians (12 children) were killed, including 27 in the Damascus Suburbs. 40 rebels were killed, including a commander in Aleppo. 32 soldiers were also killed.

=== 16 November ===
- The LCC reported 122 people killed, including 35 in the Damascus suburbs.

=== 17 November ===
- The LCC reported 136 people killed, including 63 in the Damascus suburbs.
- One General and 12 other officers defected from the Syrian army and crossed the border into Turkey, they were among 53 people who also included defecting soldiers and their families.
- A Turkish journalist held for three months by the Syrian Government was freed and sent back to Turkey, his Jordanian colleague is still missing.
- Rebels captured a military airport near rebel-held Abu Kamal, meaning that the only air base the Syrian Government holds in the Deiz ez zor region is the main one near Deiz ez zor city.

=== 18 November ===
- The LCC reported 78 people killed, including 26 in the Damascus suburbs.

=== 19 November ===
- The LCC reported 161 people killed, including 54 in the Damascus suburbs.

=== 20 November ===
- The LCC reported 122 people killed, including 52 in the Damascus suburbs.

=== 21 November ===
- The LCC reported 95 people killed, including 35 in Aleppo and 29 in the Damascus suburbs.

=== 22 November ===
- Rebels captured an army base in Mayadin east of Deir ez-Zor. It means that the whole region, from the Iraqi border along the Euphrates to Deir ez-Zor is now under rebel control.
- The LCC reported 151 civilians killed, including 66 in the Damascus suburbs.

=== 23 November ===
- The LCC reported 76 civilians killed, including 30 in the Damascus suburbs.

=== 24 November ===
- The LCC reported 82 civilians killed, including 35 in the Damascus suburbs.

=== 25 November ===
- Rebels and protestors launched an attack on an airbase, 15 kilometers outside Damascus, of which they say to control a "large part" of. In the attack they also said to have destroyed two helicopters on the ground.
- The LCC reported 117 civilians killed, including 55 in the Damascus suburbs.

=== 26 November ===
- Rebel fighters overran government defenses and captured the Tishrin Dam, near the town of Manbij. The dam supplies several areas of Syria with electricity.
- The LCC reported 168 civilians killed, including 90 in the Damascus suburbs.

=== 27 November ===
- The LCC reported 131 civilians killed, including 48 in the Damascus suburbs.
- A Syrian Air Force Mi-8 helicopter was downed after being hit by an apparent missile launched by Syrian rebels. According to experts, it appeared to be MANPADS.

=== 28 November ===
- Twin car bombs ripped through Jaramana, a Damascus suburb, killing at least 34 people and leaving dozens critically wounded, according to state media and hospital officials. The area is populated mostly by Christians and Druze.
- The LCC reported 160 civilians killed, including 96 in the Damascus suburbs.
- The Syrian government was the only government to use anti-personal mines in 2012 and the only government to lay any new minefields.

=== 29 November ===
- There were reports that there was fighting near the airport in Damascus, closing the road to the airport. The Dubai-based Emirates airline suspended flights to the Syrian capital due to the fighting. A plane from Egypt had landed in Damascus as scheduled, and passengers were safe but the pilot was ordered to take off back to Cairo without passengers if he felt the situation was too bad to stay longer. The internet was effectively shut down in the entire country for unknown reasons, according to internet monitoring firms.
- Rebels are said to have obtained up to 40 shoulder-launched surface-to-air missiles MANPADS according to US and Middle Eastern intelligent officials. Some of these missiles were supplied by Qatar. Some other missiles have been looted from the Syrian Army including, possibly, the more advanced SA-16 other than generic SA-7.
- State media is reporting that the rebels have been pushed back from the road to the Damascus International Airport and that they have started burning nearby orchards in order to drive the rebels out. In relation to the cut off of the internet across Syria, the non-lethal aid supplied by the US to the rebels included 2,000 communication kits. These kits are designed to operate outside of Syrian internet infrastructure likewise the Syrian government forces are unlikely to be affected as they have their own radios, meaning that the biggest people affected are civilian users. Those with satellite phones are also unaffected. It is common practice for government forces to cut off communications, such as the internet, prior to an offensive such as occurred in Egypt during 2011.
- The LCC reported 96 civilians killed, including 51 in Aleppo.

=== 30 November ===
- At least 12 Lebanese militants were killed in a Syrian army ambush near the town of Talkalakh.
- SOHR said 30 Lebanese militants had gone missing and a security source told Reuters that they were accompanied by nine Syrians as well as Libyans, Egyptians and Yemenis.
- Rebels have claimed to have destroyed three Syrian army tanks in fighting near the Damascus International Airport.
- Given the ongoing cut to the internet in Syria, Google and Twitter have reactivated their voice to tweet program. This allows a person with a phone connection to send tweets by speaking into their phone. The system was developed for use during protests in Egypt when the Egyptian government cut off the internet for several days last year.
- The Internet blackout that was blamed on a government effort to restrict the flow of communications, a claim the government vigorously denied. Journalists used improvised systems to broadcast live reports from Aleppo.
- The LCC reported 138 civilians killed, including 70 in the Damascus suburbs.

== December 2012 ==
=== 1 December ===
- Syria was without internet and mobile phone coverage for a third straight day. Rebels without satellite phones had to use landlines, which are monitored by the government forcing them to speak in code. The hardest hit were civilians, in government controlled areas, who were unable to ring emergency services in the case of any casualties caused by fighting. Later that day, internet and telephone service had returned to much of Syria. Rebels are claiming that they have captured a number of SA-16 missiles and a defected soldier, specifically trained to use such weapons, was credited with downing two helicopters over two consecutive days.
- The LCC reported 165 civilians/rebels killed, including 60 in the Damascus suburbs.

=== 2 December ===
- 15 people died when a car bomb exploded in the central Syrian city of Homs. The Syrian Human Rights Observatory said in a communique that the vehicle blew up in the Al-Malaa al-Baladi neighborhood. Opposition activists with the General Committee of the Syrian Revolution said that among those killed, at least three children and a woman. No one has claimed responsibility.
- Lebanese troops fought with Syrian rebels on the border between the two countries, in what a security source said was the first such clash between Lebanon's army and the rebels. The clash occurred when a Lebanese border patrol spotted the rebel fighters along the border and the rebels opened fire to prevent the patrol from approaching, a Lebanese military source said. There were no casualties.
- Meanwhile, Syrian army forces pounded rebel-held suburbs around Damascus with fighter jets and rockets on Sunday, killing and wounding dozens in an offensive to push rebels away from the airport and stop them closing in on the capital.
- Shells fired from Syria hit a Turkish border town of Reyhanlı in the first cross-border shelling incident since Turkey requested that NATO deploy Patriot air defence missiles near its border.
- Syrian state television broadcast images of more than five dead bodies with Lebanese identification, reporting that the men were among 21 Lebanese Salafist fighters who fell into a Syrian Army ambush Friday. The station said that the men were killed in Tal Kalakh after sneaking into the country from Wadi Khaled, and that others in the group had been wounded.
- Haaretz reports on 2 December that the Syrian government may be preparing to use chemical weapons.
- The LCC reported 202 killed, including 82 in the Damascus suburbs.

=== 3–4 December ===
- On 3 December, U.S. President Barack Obama said that there would be consequences if the Syrian government decides to use chemical weapons. The LCC also reported 239 civilians/rebels killed, including 116 in the Damascus suburbs.
- The next day, NATO agreed to a request from Turkey to deploy Patriot missiles along its southern border with Syria. Several hours after the agreement Russia delivered its first shipment of Iskandar missiles to Syria when naval logistic vessels docked at Tartus.
- The LCC reported 184 killed, including 110 in the Damascus suburbs.

=== 5 December ===
- U.S. officials claimed to NBC News that the military of Syria has loaded the deadly nerve gas, Sarin into aerial bombs.
- The LCC reported 107 killed, including 45 in the Damascus suburbs.

=== 6–10 December ===
- On 6 December, the LCC reported 89 civilians/rebels killed, including 45 in the Damascus suburbs. On 7 December, the LCC reported 130 civilians/rebels killed, including 51 in a massacre in Deir Ezzor and 45 in the Damascus suburbs.
- On 8 December, the LCC reported 129 civilians/rebels killed, including 58 in the Damascus suburbs. The same day, Syria wrote to U.N. Secretary-General Ban Ki-moon and the chairman of the UN Security Council in saying it would not use chemical weapons during the battles. The Foreign Ministry's letters read:

The U.S. administration has consistently worked over the past year to launch a campaign of allegations on the possibility that Syria could use chemical weapons during the current crisis. What raises concerns about this news circulated by the media is our serious fear that some of the countries backing terrorism and terrorists might provide the armed terrorist groups with chemical weapons and claim that it was the Syrian government that used the weapons."

- American officials said on 8 December that American satellites and other tools have detected increased activity at several chemical weapons depots in Syria. They believe that at least one military base has been ordered to begin combining components of Sarin nerve gas to make it ready to use. William Hague, the British Secretary, confirmed their awareness of the evidence.

We have seen some evidence of that," he said. "We and the US, as I said in parliament this week, have seen some evidence of that and that is why we have issued strong warnings about it. We have done so directly to the Syrian regime." "Very concerned that as the opposition advances, in particular on Damascus, that the regime might very well consider the use of chemical weapons. The intelligence that we have causes serious concerns that this is being considered.

- On 9 December, the LCC reported 116 killed, including 41 in the Damascus suburbs.
- On 10 December, the LCC reported 142 killed, including 59 in Aleppo and 50 in the Damascus suburbs.
- A video recording is published on YouTube, where unarmed and immobilized prisoner is being beheaded by a child using a machete. The rebels gathered around shout "Allah akbar", then they display two bodies with severed heads. The perpetrators are believed to be members of Khalid ibn al-Waleed brigade, a part of FSA.

=== 11 December ===
- U.S. declare the Al-Nusra Front to be a terrorist organisation. The UNHCR reported: "According to UNHCR's latest figures for Lebanon, Jordan, Iraq, Turkey and North Africa, 509,559 Syrians are either already registered or in the process of being registered." When asked about news on chemical weapons movement, U.S. Defence Secretary Leon Panetta said "At this point the intelligence has really kind of levelled off. We haven't seen anything new indicating any aggressive steps to move forward in that way."
- Allegedly, 125 were hurt or killed in a series of explosions that destroyed several houses in the Alawite village of Aqrab, Hama. An Alawite resident from a nearby town blamed the attack on rebels from Houla, about 8 km. from Aqrab, which suffered a massacre of more than 100 Sunnis last May, in which more than half of the victims were children. However, Alex Thomson of Channel 4 has given a different account of the events.
- The LCC reported 165 killed (not including Aqrab). 61 of the deaths were reported in the Damascus suburbs.
- In an interview with ABC News, U.S. President Barack Obama announced that his government will recognize the Syrian rebels as the legitimate government of Syria.

=== 12 December ===
- American officials in the Obama Administration reported that the Assad government has begun using Scud missiles, calling it a "significant escalation." As many as 6 Scuds have been launched from the Damascus area at rebel targets in northern Syria.
- Three bombs exploded outside the Interior Ministry building in Damascus, killing five and injuring at least 23. Earlier in the day, more than 100 countries recognized a new Syrian opposition coalition formed in November, the National Coalition for Syrian Revolutionary and Opposition Forces.
- The LCC reported 113 killed, including 41 in Aleppo and 31 in the Damascus suburbs.

=== 13 December ===
- Mikhail Bogdanov, the deputy foreign minister of Russia – admitted for the first time that Bashar Al-Assad is losing the Syrian Civil War.
- Six members of an NBC News team in Syria, including chief foreign correspondent Richard Engel, were abducted in Syria after the rebel group escorting them was ambushed. The news of their disappearance was largely withheld until they became free due to a media blackout. Engel had initially blamed pro-regime Shabiha for the abduction, but in 2015 had to correct his account of the event, acknowledging that the NBC team "was almost certainly taken by a Sunni criminal element affiliated with the Free Syrian Army," as New York Times investigations found out.
- The LCC reported 138 killed, including 69 in the Damascus suburbs.

=== 14 December ===
- The LCC reported 106 killed, including 49 in the Damascus suburbs.

=== 15 December ===
- The LCC reported 131 people killed, including 36 in the Damascus suburbs.
- It was reported that 60 members of the PFLP-GC defected to the rebels and anti-Assad Palestinian brigades in Yarmouk camp, Damascus. The PFLP-GC leader, Ahmed Jibril fled to Tartous after rebels gained ground in the district. The PFLP-GC denied reports that the storm brigade had taken the entire Yarmouk district, although Government jets later bombed the southern district, killing 8 civilians/rebels. This air attack was condemned by Ban Ki-moon, who called it a matter of "grave concern".

=== 16 December ===
- The LCC reported 183 people killed, including 60 in the Damascus suburbs. Rebels assaulted Syrian Army checkpoints in the vicinity of Halfaya, and were shelled by government forces. The fighting and shelling resulted in the deaths of 23 civilians in the town according to the pro-opposition SOHR, and a later report by New Lines Institute.

=== 17 December ===
- The LCC reported 158 people killed, including 50 in the Damascus suburbs.

=== 18 December ===
- The LCC reported 128 people killed, including 42 in the Damascus suburbs.
- On the road between Tartus and Homs two Russians and an Italian were kidnapped, with the kidnappers demanding an unspecified ransom. The Russian navy is also deploying five ships, a destroyer, tugboat, tanker and two large amphibious landing vessels to the port of Tartus. The port at Tartus is the only Russian naval base outside of the former Soviet Union. The deployment of the two amphibious landing vessels is a possible indication that the Russian government is considering a large scale evacuation of Russian citizens in Syria.
- American journalist Richard Engel, who was ambushed along with the rest of his team was freed. They later went on The Today Show to discuss their ordeal. They were captured by pro-Assad militia, who executed one of the journalists rebel escorts. The Shabiha group loyal to al-Assad wanted to exchange Engel and his crew for four Iranian soldiers and two Lebanese militants captured by the rebels. The news crew were moved to various locations throughout the time they were missing. The Shabibha group drove into a checkpoint manned by rebels belonging to Ahrar ash-Sham, who freed the hostages five days later. At least two of Engel's captors were killed in the shootout to free the journalist. NBC News had requested a news blackout out of concern for Engel and his crew's safety, and on 18 December it was reported by the US media that they had been kidnapped but were released unharmed.
- Rebels reportedly overran army positions around Halfaya and gained control over the town. Rebels had advanced 40 kilometres (25 mi) south from Maarrat al-Nu'man and Jisr ash-Shugour, encountering little resistance.

=== 19 December ===
- The LCC reported 161 people killed, including 67 in the Damascus suburbs.
- After rebels took control of Yarmouk in Damascus and thousands of Palestinian refugees left the area due to heavy fighting the FSA declared the district a "liberated area" and handed it over to Palestinian control.

=== 20 December ===
- The LCC reported 117 people killed, including 42 in the Damascus suburbs.
- Syrian plane released cluster bombs onto neighborhoods and homes, over the town of Marea in Syria. In what was described by the victims of the attacks as collective punishment. Local Freedom Hospital counted 4 dead and 23 wounded.

=== 21 December ===
- The LCC reported 169 people killed, including 58 in the Damascus suburbs.
- The Syrian government has fired at least 6 Scud-B at rebel targets in Syria according to NATO. One missile landed 20 miles from the Turkish border with at least 4 landing near Aleppo. NATO would not comment on what targets were hit or the damage done. The use of Scud missiles may be due to rebel efforts to limit the Syrian Air Force's capacities.

=== 22 December ===
- The LCC reported 143 people killed, including 75 in the Damascus suburbs.
- Russian military advisors have told the Syrian government to move its stockpile of chemical weapons from "many locations" into "one or two" so as to safeguard them.

=== 23 December ===
- Up to 200 people were killed in Halfaya when the Syrian Air Force bombed a bakery killing those who were standing in line for bread.
- The LCC reported 208 people killed, including those from the Helfaya massacre and 51 in the Damascus suburbs.
- Seven people died and dozens were injured in a rebel held area of Homs with rebels blaming the use of a chemical gas by government forces. Doctors have reported that the symptoms of the gas are similar to those of sarin gas. However, it has also been reported that U.S. officials feel skeptical about the claim because sarin is odorless and deadly in small amounts, while the reports speak of a foul stench and significant inhalation. Other suggested causes are the chemicals chlorine, phosgene, cyanogen chloride, or even a severe asthma attack. Israeli officials also expressed doubts that chemical weapons were used.

=== 24 December ===
- The LCC reported 156 people killed, including 60 in the Damascus suburbs.

=== 25 December ===
- Syria's military police chief Major General Abdulaziz al-Sallal defected, becoming the highest-ranking military defector to defect since the Chemical Weapons department's head, Major General Adnan Sillue, defected. However a government source, while confirming the defection, claims that he was near retirement and had announced his defection only as to play hero.
- The LCC reported 171 people killed, including 61 in the Damascus suburbs.

=== 26 December ===
- The LCC reported 164 people killed, including 32 in the Damascus suburbs.
- The Syrian Observatory for Human Rights reported 45,048 people have been killed in the fighting in Syria since March 2011. The Observatory however believes that this is not the true figure as both sides hide their total casualties. The Attorney-General for Aleppo province also announced his defection to the rebels and protestors.

=== 27 December ===
- The LCC reported 197 people killed, including 103 in the Damascus suburbs, among which 50 were found field executed in a town alongside the Damascus-Daraa highway.

=== 28 December ===
- A Turkish official said that 2 airforce generals and 3 state TV journalists defected to Turkey on 28 December. The government forced the rebels out of the Deir Baalbah neighborhood leaving the rebels in control of the Khalidiyah district and parts of the old city. Dozens of civilians have been reported as being killed in the fighting in Homs.
- The LCC reported 137 people killed, including 138 in the Damascus suburbs.

=== 29 December ===
- Opposition groups reported that as many as 400 people were killed in Syria, about half of them were civilians slain in a mass killing carried out by government troops in the Deir Baalba, a suburb of the central city of Homs. The massacre followed government troops retaking control of the rebel-held town, after surrounded it about a month ago.
- An unknown source says 201 people by a captured Syrian army soldier said had been executed in the Deir Baalba neighborhood of Homs. Another anonymous source says: At least 392 people were killed on 29 December, the LCC said. The death toll includes 201 people who a captured Syrian army soldier said had been executed in the Deir Baalba neighborhood of Homs.

=== 30 December ===
- The LCC reported 130 civilians killed, including 82 in the Damascus suburbs.
- Syrian Observatory for Human Rights however, estimated Sunday's death toll at over 150, most of them in Aleppo province.

=== 31 December ===
- Thirty to fifty bodies were found in the Barzeh district, Damascus. They showed signs of torture. Republican Guard forces started the biggest attack on Daraya, Damascus in two months.
- Turkey denied any infiltration attempt. Demonstrators blew up a natural gas pipeline near Deir ez-Zor in the oil-rich east, disrupting distribution.
- The LCC reported 119 civilians killed, including 49 in the Damascus suburbs.

== See also ==
- Syrian–Turkish border clashes during the Syrian Civil War
