= Battle of Tell Abyad (2013) =

Military confrontation

- Part of the Rojava–Islamist conflict
Date	19–30 July 2013 (1 week and 4 days)
Location	Tell Abyad, Tell Abyad District, Raqqa Governorate, Syria
Result	Rebel victory: Kurdish forces driven out of Tell Abyad; Thousands of civilians displaced

Belligerents
(Syrian opposition) Kurdish Front: Sheikh Ayoub Battalion; (Democratic Autonomous Administration of North and East Syria) Democratic Union Party: People's Protection Units; Women's Protection Units	Islamic State of Iraq and the Levant: Al-Nusra Front; Ahrar al-Sham; Al-Sakhana Brigades

Commanders and leaders
(Syrian opposition) Haji Ahmed Kurdi (Kurdish Front commander)	Khalaf Thiyab "Abu Musab" (POW) (al-Nusra Front commander)

Casualties and losses
Unknown	25–34 killed

The 2013 battle of Tell Abyad was a military confrontation in the town of Tell Abyad between the Kurdish Front and the Democratic Union Party-affiliated People's Protection Units and Women's Protection Units against the Islamic State of Iraq and the Levant, al-Nusra Front (an al-Qaeda affiliate), and Ahrar al-Sham, resulting in a Kurdish defeat and the jihadist capture of the town.

== Background ==
Tell Abyad is located across the town of Akçakale on the Syria-Turkey border. On 19 September 2012, the Farouq Brigades of the Free Syrian Army captured Tell Abyad from Syrian government forces. Following their capture of Raqqa in March 2013, the al-Nusra Front set up a checkpoint on the outskirts of Tell Abyad and captured 33 fighters from the Farouq Brigades. Clashes between the two groups resulted in the Farouq Brigades commander, Abu Azzam, being wounded in action. Abu Azzam previously survived an assassination attempt by car bomb. He and other wounded rebels was transferred to a hospital in Şanlıurfa, Turkey. The next week, the 33 Farouq Brigades prisoners were released by the al-Nusra Front and the border crossing was reopened.

On 17 July 2013, the YPG fully captured the city of Ras al-Ayn from ISIL and al-Nusra. The latter retreated to the northern Raqqa Governorate, mainly in Tell Abyad. ISIL and al-Nusra Front fighters arrested many Syrian Kurdish civilians on charges of Kurdish nationalism. ISIL also called on the residents of Tell Abyad to pledge allegiance to their self-proclaimed caliphate. In response, a YPG battalion was formed in the Kurdish neighbourhoods of the town.

== Battle ==
On 20 July 2013, the Kurdish Front Brigade captured Khalaf Thiyab "Abu Musab", an al-Nusra commander and 4 other Nusra members on charges that they attempted to blow up themselves in the "People's House", the Democratic Union Party office in Tell Abyad. Clashes then erupted in the town. By the next day, more than 1,000 residents were detained by Islamist groups in order to pressure the PYD to release the al-Nusra members, and both were released. Hundreds of residents fled the town.

On 22 July, ISIL raided, looted, and demolished dozens of houses of the hundreds of Kurdish civilians who fled after their neighbourhoods were attacked by tanks and other heavy weapons. More than 10 al-Nusra fighters were killed. YPG and Kurdish Front forces surrounded the Akçakale border crossing which was then closed by Turkey. By the next week, ISIL defeated the Kurdish forces and took full control of Tell Abyad, forcing thousands of Kurdish civilians to flee.

== Aftermath ==
Many Kurdish refugees from Tell Abyad fled to nearby Tell Akhdar. 70% of its residents had already fled. In August 2013 Ahrar al-Sham took over the village. On 13 October, clashes renewed between Kurdish forces and joint rebel jihadist forces west of Tell Abyad.

In January 2014, infighting erupted between Ahrar al-Sham and ISIL and the latter gained complete control over the Tell Abyad countryside. Clashes between the YPG and ISIL west of Tell Abyad again renewed in March. Hundreds of ISIL militants surrounded Tell Akhdar and threatened to kill all those who remained in the village. All residents fled and most became refugees in Kobanî, which was also besieged later in the year.

In February 2015, Euphrates Volcano forces steadily advanced into the northern Raqqa countryside from both the west and the east, capturing 19 villages. Tell Abyad was then captured by joint YPG and FSA forces on 16 June 2015.
