= Al-Zaazu' =

Al-Zaazu' الزعزوع
- Village
- Location in Syria
- Coordinates: 36°38′40″N 39°13′32″E
- Country: Syria
- Governorate: Raqqa Governorate
- District: Tell Abyad District
- Nahiyah: Suluk

Population (2004 census)
  - Total: 779
- Time zone: UTC+3 (EET)
  - Summer (DST): UTC+2 (EEST)

Al-Zaazu' (Arabic: الزعزوع) is a village in northern Syria, administratively part of Raqqa Governorate, located north of Raqqa. According to the Syria Central Bureau of Statistics (CBS), al-Zaazu' had a population of 779 in the 2004 census.
