= Houtat Sulūk =

Canyon in Raqqa Governorate, Syria

Coordinates: 36.5023°N 39.1992°E

Houtat Sulūk is a canyon, about 500 metres (1,600 ft) long, in Suluk Subdistrict, Tell Abyad District, Raqqa Governorate, Syria. It is about 65 kilometres (40 mi) north of Raqqa and circa 10 kilometres (6.2 mi) southeast of Sulūk, near the Turkish border. Locals have reported that some hundreds of, to a thousand dead bodies were thrown to the bottom of the canyon by several militia groups during the Syrian Civil War.
