= Ayn Issa =

Ayn Issa عين عيسى
- Town
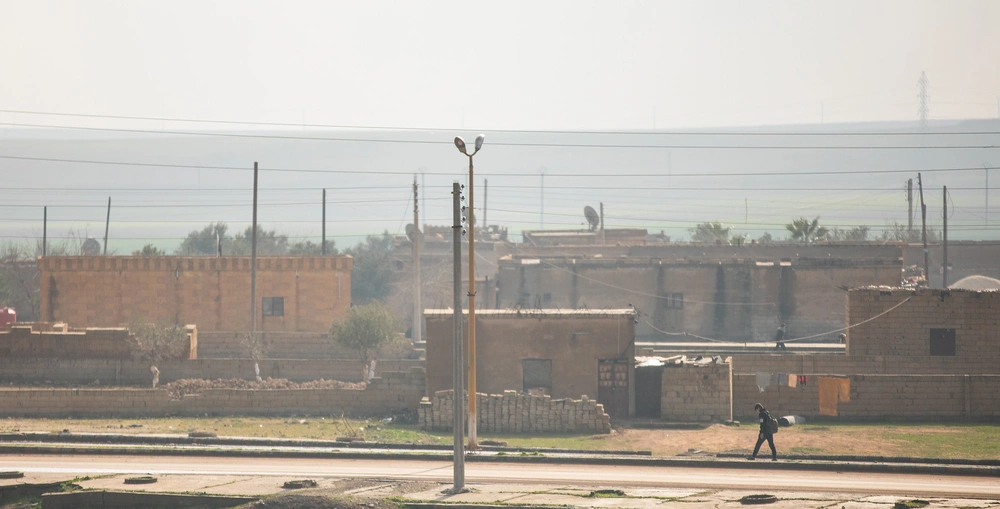
- A local walks down the streets of Ayn Issa.

- Location in Syria
- Coordinates: 36°23′7″N 38°51′34″E
- Country: Syria
- Governorate: Raqqa
- District: Tell Abyad
- Subdistrict: Ayn Issa

Population (2004 census)
  - Town: 6,730
  - Nahiyah: 40,912
- Time zone: UTC+3 (AST)
- P-Code: C5905
- Geocode: SY110202

Ayn Issa (also Ain Issa; Arabic: عين عيسى, lit. 'Eye of Jesus') is a town in the Tell Abyad District of Raqqa Governorate, Syria. It is located halfway between the Syria–Turkey border town of Tell Abyad and the regional capital Raqqa. Through the city runs the M4 highway connecting Aleppo with the Hasakah Governorate. The town is predominantly Arab, with Kurds comprising approximately 15% of the population.

The town has played a major role as a political center for the Democratic Autonomous Administration of North and East Syria (DAANES) until 2026. Furthermore, it held significant strategic importance due to its proximity to Raqqa, the former capital of the Islamic State (ISIS), and continues to be strategically relevant as a frontline city in the defense of Kobane following Turkish offensives.

== History ==
During the early stages of the Syrian civil war, the takeover of Ayn Issa by ISIS led to the displacement of many Kurdish residents.

In June 2015, Ayn Issa was captured from ISIS by the Kurdish People's Protection Units (YPG), Women's Protection Units (YPJ), and the Raqqa Revolutionaries Brigade in the course of the Tell Abyad offensive. While it was shortly recaptured by ISIS militants, it was reclaimed by the YPG in early July of the same year.

=== Political role ===
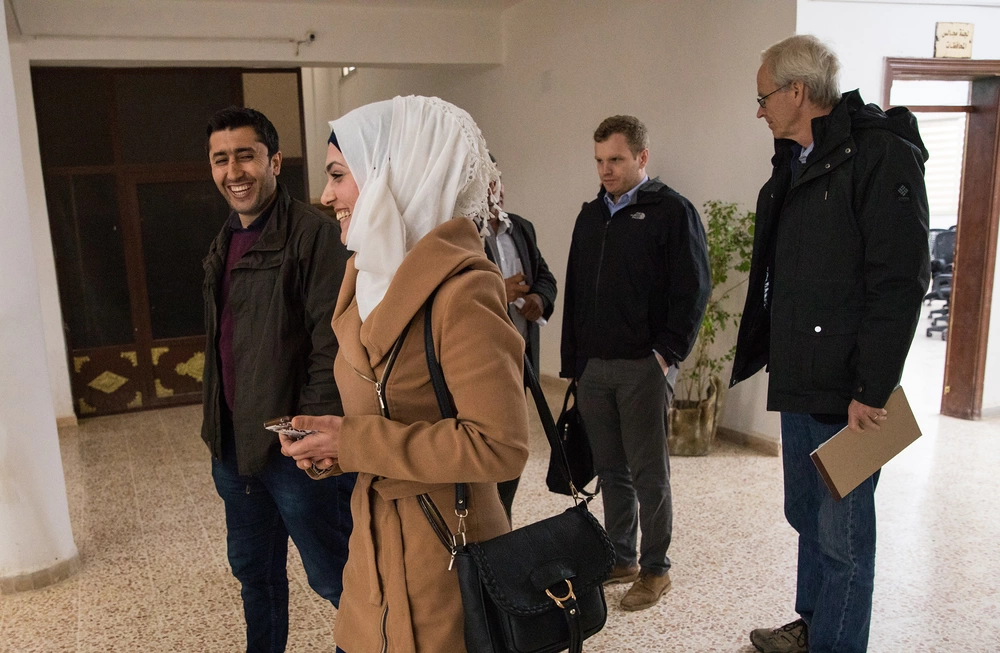
William V. Roebuck meeting with officials of the DAANES in Ayn Issa, 14 February 2019.

Under the DAANES, Ayn Issa became a seat of government for the Syrian Democratic Council (SDC), a move intended to enhance Arab representation and participation in governance.

According to Enab Baladi, Ayn Issa benefited after years of neglect under Baʿathist rule from the establishment of a U.S. military base and numerous institutions and councils of the DAANES. The town hosted meetings involving DAANES officials, members of the Global Coalition, and Western representatives, as well as regular sessions of DAANES bodies, including the Interior Authority, Health Authority, Women's Council, and executive councils. Ayn Issa also hosted a “Tribal Forum” attended by tribal leaders and senior DAANES officials.

As a result of this political activity, Ayn Issa came to function as a de facto semi-capital of the DAANES.

=== Ayn Issa refugee camp ===
Since April 2016, the Ayn Issa refugee camp, which is located on the outskirts of the town, has housed approximately 9,000 refugees by July 2018. The camp houses mostly Syrian Internally Displaced Persons (IDPs) from the governorates of Deir ez-Zor and Raqqa.

=== 2019 Turkish offensive into northeastern Syria ===
In the wake of the 2019 Turkish offensive into northeastern Syria, Russian and Assad regime forces entered Ayn Issa on 14 October 2019 and established joint control with the Syrian Democratic Forces (SDF) following an agreement aimed at preventing further Turkish advances in the area.

Turkish advances were stopped in front of Ayn Issa, however, the offensive forced the evacuation of the town, prompting the SDC to relocate its seat of government to Raqqa.

On 8 December 2024, a Turkish drone strike in Ayn Issa killed a family of 11 civilians, including women and children, according to reports by the Syrian Observatory for Human Rights (SOHR) and Hawar News Agency.

=== 2020–21 Ayn Issa clashes ===
On 23 November 2020, clashes broke out between the Turkish-backed Syrian National Army (SNA) and SDF near Ayn Issa. On December 1, Lebanon's al-Akhbar newspaper reported that the SDF managed to ambush Turkish-backed forces, killing 30 fighters.
