= Raqqa Subdistrict =

Raqqa Subdistrict ناحية الرقّة
- Subdistrict
- Location of Raqqa Subdistrict within Raqqa Governorate

- Location in Syria
- Coordinates (Raqqa): 35.95°N 39.02°E
- Country: Syria
- Governorate: Raqqa
- District: Raqqa District
- Seat: Raqqa

Area
  - Total: 2,891.72 km^{2} (1,116.50 sq mi)

Population (2004)
  - Total: 338,773
  - Density: 117.153/km^{2} (303.424/sq mi)
- Geocode: SY110100

Raqqa Subdistrict or ar-Raqqah Nahiyah (Arabic: ناحية الرقّة), a subdistrict of Raqqa District, is the central area of Raqqa Governorate (Syria), including the city of Raqqa and the nearby countryside north of the Euphrates. The subdistrict population at the 2004 census was 338,773, the majority of which living in Raqqa city itself.

The administrative centre is Raqqa. Formerly, much of the subdistrict was controlled by ISIS.

Raqqa Subdistrict is bounded by the Euphrates to the South, Tal Abyad District to the North, and also of Raqqa District: Al-Jarniyah Subdistrict to the West, and Al-Karamah Subdistrict to the East.

== Towns and villages ==
The towns and villages in Raqqa Subdistrict and their populations as at the 2004 census were:

- Abbara (لعبارة), pop 1305
- Abu Kabret Al Rashid (أبو كبرة-الرشيد), pop 686
- Abu Rajab (أبو رجب), pop 844
- Abu Suseh (أبو سوسة), pop 2561
- Adnaniyeh (لعدنانية), pop 1931
- Andalus (لأندلس), pop 1000
- Raqqa (لرقة), pop 220488
- Assadiya (لأسدية), pop 3992
- Atshana (لعطشانة), pop 169
- Ayuj (لأعيوج), pop 659
- Berani (بعراني), pop 326
- Big Sweidiyeh (سويدية كبيرة), aka Suwaydiya Kabir, pop 6106
- Bir Elhasham (بئر الهشم), pop 79
- Bir Said (بئر سعيد), pop 117
- Eastern Khayala (لخيالة الشرقية), pop 4457
- Faraa (لفارعة), pop 3809
- Fteih (لفتيح), pop 390
- Ghota (لغوطة), pop 2163
- Hadba (لحدباء), pop 602
- Hawi Elhawa (حاوي الهوى), pop 1651
- Hazimeh (حزيمة), pop 3386
- Hettin (حطين), pop 2627
- Hfeiret Elsoqur (حفيرة الصقور), pop 138
- Hilo Abed (حلو عبد), pop 1443
- Htash (حتاش), pop 455
- Hweijet Faraj (حويجة فرج), pop 945
- Jalaa (لجلاء), pop 1253
- Kalta (لكالطة), pop 2626
- Kardus (كردوس), pop 158
- Katuniyeh (لخاتونية), pop 3651
- Kdeiran (كديران), pop 4697
- Khayala (لخيالة), pop 234
- Kisret Elsheikh Jomaa (كسرة شيخ الجمعة), pop 2956
- Laqta (لقطة), pop 529
- Little Sweidiyeh (سويدية صغيرة), aka Suwaydiya Saghirah, pop 809
- Marj Abu Shareb (مرج أبو شارب), pop 132
- Mashrafa (لمشرفة), pop 230
- Milsun (ميسلون), pop 1766
- Moezleh (معيزيلة), pop 646
- Qahtaniyeh (لقحطانية), pop 2490
- Rabee'a (ربيعة), pop 1906
- Raeqqet Samra (رقة سمرة), pop 4077
- Rahmaniya (لرحمانية), pop 513
- Rashidiyeh (لرشيد), pop 1626
- Rohayat (لرحيات), pop 1355
- Royan (رويان), pop 735
- Safyan (صفيان), pop 395
- Sahl (لسحل), pop 2772
- Shamiyeh (لشامية), pop 625
- Sukariyet Tal Elsamen (سكرية تل السمن), pop 1967
- Tal Elsamen Dahham (تل السمن دحام), pop 2530
- Talet Elansar (طالعة الأنصار), pop 190
- Tawi Rumman (طاوي رمان), pop 1348
- Thulth Khneiz (ثلث خنيز), pop 846
- Tishrine (تشرين), pop 1850
- Tweilah (لطويلعة), pop 196
- Um Elhweyeh (أم الحوية), pop 336
- Upper Khneiz (خنيز فوقاني), pop 1101
- Western Kabsh (كبش غربي), pop 1272
- Western Sahlabiyeh (لسلحبية غربية), pop 3568
- Widyan (لوديان, aka Bi'r Huwaym/Bir Khuwaym/بئر حويم), pop 831
- Wihdeh (لوحدة), pop 842
- Yaarub (يعرب), pop 1403
- Yamama (ليمامة), pop 1408
- Yarmuk (ليرموك), pop 3221
- Yathreb (يثرب), pop 1335
- Zahera (لزاهرة), pop 461
- ? (16 تشرين), pop 498
- ? (لأنصار), pop 1587
- ? (لثامرية), pop 43
- ? (لحمزة), pop 168
- ? (لحميدان), pop 62
- Dahlan or Dehlan (لدحلان), pop 102
- ? (لدرة), pop 339
- Drubiyeh (لدروبية), pop 1929
- ? (لدهموش), pop 590
- ? (لسلحبية شرقية), pop 1796
- ? (لصديق), pop 95
- ? (لفيحاء), pop 1218
- ? (لمظلة), pop 122
- ? (بئر الجربوع), pop 591
- ? (جهينة), pop 194
- ? (خربة اللحم), pop 40
- ? (خنيز الغانم), pop 858
- ? (رطلة), pop 4712
- ? (شنينة), pop 386
- ? (كبش وسطي), pop 383
- ? (كسرة عفنان), pop 986
- ? (مرندية غربية), pop 226
- ? (واسطة الرفدي), pop 103

== Syrian civil war ==
By March 2013 all of the countryside and effectively the city had fallen into rebel hands. During December 2016 the Syrian Democratic Forces drove ISIS out of most of the neighbouring Al-Jarniyah Subdistrict. Early in January 2017 the SDF extended their advance into south-western parts of Raqqa Subdistrict, occupying the area around Bi'r Huwaym / Widyan (Arabic: الوديان), and western Sweidiyeh.

The SDF extended their control the north of Raqqa Governorate into Raqqa Subdistrict as far south as the hill Tal Saman (Arabic: تل السمن), gaining control of Thulth Khneiz and several other villages in November 2016. At that time an elementary school and the water purification system in Sukariyet Tal Elsamen were severely damaged in air raids, and among other casualties one American Special Operations trooper died at Tal Saman. Further gains by the SDF were reported in January 2017 including Abu Suseh, Mashrafa and Ayuj. With the capture of Big Sweidiyeh on 21 January 2017, the SDF were in control of all parts of the nahiyah north of the irrigation canal running from Lake Assad to Tal Saman.
