= Hassan Jalali =

Syrian politician (born 1950)

- حسن جلالي

Governor of Raqqa Governorate
- In office 17 September 2012 – 4 March 2013
- President: Bashar al-Assad
- Preceded by: Adnan Abdo al-Sukhni
- Succeeded by: Abdul Khaled Al-Hamoud

Personal details
- Born: 1950 (age 75–76) Ayn al-Tineh, Quneitra Governorate, Syria
- Education: Damascus University
- Profession: Bureaucrat; Politician

Hassan Saleh Jalali (Arabic: حسن صالح جلالي; born 1950) is a Syrian bureaucrat and politician who served as Governor of Raqqa from 2012 to 2013.

== Early life and education ==
Jalali was born in Ayn al-Tineh, Quneitra Governorate in 1950 to Saleh and Abida. He was raised in poverty. He studied law at Damascus University. As a law student, he failed several core subjects and was rumored to retake those at Beirut Arab University. Nevertheless, he earned a bachelor's degree in law in 1981 with a grade pass.

== Career ==
Jalali was appointed as director of Deir Atiyah by bribing Mohammad Deeb Daaboul and served in that position for 15 years. During his tenure as director of Deir Atiyah, he was known for his corruption and organized an international smuggling route between Syria and Lebanon. In organizing the smuggling route, he cooperated with drug traffickers, cigarette smugglers, and arms dealers.

After stepping down as a director of Deir Atiyah, Jalali served as director of Al-Nabek for five years. While serving as director of Al-Nabek, Jalali was known as a corrupt leader, prompting locals to report his corruption to the Ministry of Interior. As a result, the ministry would only allow his transfer if the president ordered it.

Jalali then became the deputy minister of interior for civil affairs in 2006. His appointment as deputy minister of interior for civil affairs was controversial, as a rumor circulated that the position was created for him. As a deputy minister of interior for civil affairs, some sources accused him of manipulating numerous demographic records and data to "reshape demographics of the Syrian people". Meanwhile, he also became the chairman of committees responsible for amending the Civil Status Law.

=== Governor of Raqqa ===
During the Syrian Revolution, Jalali was a second-tier government official. Assad appointed Jalali as Governor of Raqqa on 17 September 2012. Serving as governor during the civil war, he responded by strengthening security and suppressing opposition. Moreover, after the fall of Tell Abyad in September 2012, he made deals with the local opposition that allowed basic service from the regime to be available in the town. He also survived the an assassination attempt on 13 November 2012 when an unknown group targeted his convoy.

The rebels captured him and the head of Ba'ath Party of the Raqqa region, Salman al-Salman, on 4 March 2013 during the Battle of Raqqa. The rebels recorded their capture and released the video showing that Jalali praised them for "safeguarding properties and defending civilians". He was rumored to have died. However, his fate after the capture remained unknown as of 2018.

== Controversy ==
=== Fake diploma ===
Jalali claimed that he earned two PhD degrees in 2004 from Russia and the European Academy for Informatics in Belgium. However, an investigation carried out by Ministry of Higher Education in 2008 showed that he did not leave Syria for more than 7 days throughout 2004, and his PhD diploma from Belgium was forged.
