= Adnan Abdo al-Sukhni =

Syrian politician

Adnan Abdo Al Sukhni عدنان عبدو السخني

Minister of Industry
- In office 16 August 2012 – 22 August 2013
- President: Bashar al-Assad
- Prime Minister: Wael Al Halaqi
- Preceded by: Fuad Shukri Kurdi
- Succeeded by: Kamal Eddin Tu'ma

Governor of Raqqa
- In office 2010 – 16 August 2012
- Preceded by: Ahmed Shehadeh Khalil
- Succeeded by: Hassan Saleh Jalali

Personal details
- Born: 1961 (age 64–65) Aleppo
- Party: Syrian Regional Branch of the Arab Socialist Ba'ath Party
- Education: Charles University

Adnan Abdo Al Sukhni (Arabic: عدنان عبدو السخني; born 1961) is a Syrian politician who served as industry minister from August 2012 to August 2013.

== Education ==
Sukhni was born in Aleppo in 1961. He received a PhD in electrical engineering from the Charles University in the Republic of Czechoslovakia.

== Career ==
Sukhni served at Syria's People's Assembly for three terms. From 2010 to 2012, he was the governor of Raqqa Governorate before being replaced by Hassan Saleh Jalali. He was appointed industry minister to the cabinet headed by Prime Minister Wael Al Halaqi on 16 August 2012. He stepped down as Minister of Industry on 22 August 2013 and was replaced by Kamal Eddin Tu'ma.

=== Sanctions ===
On 15 October 2012, Sukhni was added to the European Union's sanction list on the grounds that as a cabinet minister, he "shares responsibility for the regime’s violent repression against the civilian population."

On 16 May 2013, the United States Treasury Department designated four senior Syrian officials, including Sukhni, for "backing the regime of Bashar al-Assad in suppressing people or involvement in terrorism."
