= Qahtan (disambiguation) =

Qahtan (or Kahtan), (Note: Arabic: قحطان) Qahtani (or Kahtani), (Note: Arabic: قحطاني) and Al-Qahtani (or Al-Kahtani) (Note: Arabic: القحطاني) are Arabic names. They may refer to:

- Qahtan (tribe), an Arab tribal confederation in Saudi Arabia
- Qahtanite or Qahtani, Arabs who originate from the southern region of the Arabian Peninsula, especially from Yemen

== Places ==
- Al Qahtan, a village in Saudi Arabia, located in the northern part of Al-Namas governorate
- Al-Qahtaniyah, Raqqa Governorate, a town in Raqqa Governorate in northern Syria
- Al-Qahtaniyah, al-Hasakah Governorate, a town in al-Hasakah Governorate in northeastern Syria
- Qahtaniyah, Iraq, an Iraqi town about 100 km (62 mi) from Mosul and a few miles south of Sinjar

== People ==
=== Given name ===
- Qahtan al-Attar (born 1950), Iraqi singer
- Qahtan Chathir Drain (born 1973), Iraqi national footballer
- Qahtan Khalil (born 1964), Syrian military official
- Qahtan Muhammad al-Shaabi (1920–1981) South Yemeni politician, the first President of the People's Republic of South Yemen

=== Middle name ===
- Najeeb Qahtan Al-Sha'abi (1953–2021), Yemeni politician

=== Surname ===
==== Qahtan ====
- Abdul Qader Qahtan (born 1952), Yemeni jurist
- Riya Qahtan (died 2008), Iraqi Kurdish politician

==== Al-Qahtani ====
Surname derived from the Qahtanite, Qahtani or Qahtan people from Arabia

- Abdul Atif Al-Qahtani (born 1946), Saudi javelin thrower
- Abdullah Hamid Mohammed Al-Qahtani, Guantanamo detainee
- Abdulrahman Al-Qahtani (born 1983), Saudi Arabian footballer
- Abu Maria al-Qahtani (Maysar Ali Musa Abdullah al-Juburi 1976–2024) Iraqi Islamic militant fighting in the Syrian Civil War and a former commander and Shura Council member in Jabhat al-Nusra
- Aisha al-Qahtani, Qatari women's rights activist
- Attiya Al-Qahtani (born 1953), Saudi middle-distance runner
- Haji Bakr Al-Qahtani (born 1964), Saudi Arabian sprinter
- Iman al-Qahtani, Saudi journalist and activist
- Jabir Hasan Muhamed Al Qahtani, Guantanamo detainee
- Jabran al-Qahtani (born 1977), Guantanamo detainee
- Khaled Al-Qahtani (born 1985), Kuwaiti footballer
- Majed Al-Qahtani (born 1990), Saudi footballer
- Mohammed al-Qahtani (disambiguation), multiple people
- Nourah al-Qahtani, academic imprisoned for alleged social media activity
- Osama bin Laden (1957–2011), "bin Laden" is a patronymic, not a hereditary surname. According to one of his sons, Omar, the hereditary surname of Osama bin Laden was āl-Qaḥṭānī, but Osama's father, Mohammed bin Laden, never officially registered the name.
- Saud al-Qahtani (born 1978), a Saudi Arabian consultant and former royal court advisor, allegedly involved in the assassination of Jamal Khashoggi
- Sultan Jubran Sultan al-Qahtani, known as Zubayr Al-Rimi (1974–2003), a militant in al-Qaeda's Saudi wing
- Yasser Al-Qahtani (born 1982), Saudi Arabian footballer

==== Al-Kahtani ====
- Muhammad Jafar Jamal al-Kahtani (born 1973), citizen of Saudi Arabia who was a captive held in extrajudicial detention in the United States' Bagram Theater Internment Facility

== See also ==
- al-Qahtani (disambiguation)
- Al-Qahtaniyah (disambiguation)
- Bani Qahtan Castle, castle in the Syrian Coastal Mountains near Lattakia
