= Al-Qahtaniyah =

Qahtaniyah or Kahtaniya may refer to:

- Al-Qahtaniyah, Raqqa, a town in Raqqa Governorate in northern Syria
- Al-Qahtaniyah, Al-Hasakah, a town in al-Hasakah Governorate in northeastern Syria
- Qahtaniyah, Iraq, a town near Mosul in northern Iraq

== See also ==
- Qahtanite, a major tribe from Arabia
- Al-Qahtani (disambiguation), Arabic surname
