= Battle of Raqqa (2013) =

Battle in the Syrian civil war between the Syrian opposition and the Syrian government

- Part of the Raqqa campaign (2012–2013) and the Syrian civil war
- Course of the battle and control in Raqqa as of October 2013 Syrian Arab Army control Opposition control
Date	3–6 March 2013 (3 days)
Location	Raqqa, Syria 35.9500°N 39.0167°E
Result	Rebel victory
Territorial changes	Rebels seize Raqqa from government forces

Belligerents
Free Syrian Army; Ahrar al-Sham; Ansar al-Sham; Al-Nusra Front	(Ba'athist Syria) Syrian Government

Commanders and leaders
Unknown top provincial al-Nusra commander †; Unknown top provincial Ahrar al-Sham commander † (Syria) Col. Moataz Raslan (top FSA commander)	(Ba'athist Syria) Brig. Gen. Khaled al-Halabi (Raqqa's state security head) (Ba'athist Syria) Hassan Jalali (POW) (Provincial governor); Suleiman al-Suleiman (POW) (Provincial Baath party's secretary general)

Units involved
Raqqa Liberation Front; Ahfad al-Rasul Brigades; Muntasir Billah Brigade; Raqqa Revolutionaries Brigade; Northern Storm Brigade; Liwa Owais al-Qorani; Euphrates Knights Brigade; Islamic Unity and Liberation Front; Conquest Brigade; Ghuraba al-Sham Battalion; Ahrar ash-Sham; Brigade of the Trustees of Raqqa	Syrian Armed Forces; Syrian Army; 17th Division; Syrian Air Force; Local police

Strength
≈7,000 fighters	400 soldiers

Casualties and losses
40–50 killed	30 killed 300 captured
- More than 100 civilians killed from 4–5 March (Syrian Observatory for Human Rights estimate); 39 killed in air raids on 6 March

The Battle of Raqqa, also known as the First Battle of Raqqa and code named by rebels as the "Raid of the Almighty", was fought for control of the northern Syrian city of Raqqa during the Syrian civil war between Sunni Islamist rebel insurgents and the Syrian Arab Army. Rebel forces launched the offensive in early March 2013, and declared themselves in "near-total control" on 5 March, making it the first provincial capital claimed to come under rebel control in the civil war. The battle, on the opposition side, was primarily led by the al-Nusra Front and Ahrar al-Sham.

== Background ==
Raqqa was not initially a considered rebel stronghold. Despite being overwhelmingly Sunni and conservative, the city saw relatively small protests at the beginning of the uprising, which soon subsided with little violence. Anti-Assad elements within the city also remained peaceful until the end of 2012. Furthermore, previous pro-government tribal coalitions and the presence of more than a half-million internally displaced Syrians from areas in Idlib, Deir ez-Zor and Aleppo recently captured by the rebels strengthened the Syrian government's opinion that Raqqa was relatively safe. Because of this view, president Bashar al-Assad chose to visit the city and prayed at one of its mosques for Eid al-Adha in June 2012.

Not long after however, armed opposition groups began to spread across eastern Syria, leading to clashes between government and opposition forces. Dozens of people were killed in the Qahtaniya region outside the city in incidents. Shelling also reached a petrol station in the town of Tell Abyad.

By early 2013, the Syrian opposition had secured much of the north of Syria, but had yet to seize control of a major city. The rebels planned an offensive to seize control of Raqqa where government forces were in control, effectively giving the opposition control over a much greater portion of northern Syria. Raqqa fell to the rebels on 6 March, 2013 with little resistance put up by government forces, representing the first provincial capital to fall to rebel control in a major blow to the Syrian government.

== Battle ==
Rebel forces, mostly Sunni Islamist groups, based in the countryside surrounding Raqqa launched a surge into the city between 3 and 5 March, advancing from the north and overrunning army positions at the city's northernmost entrance. Most rebels who took part in the battle came from areas outside the Raqqa Governorate. They engaged forces loyal to Bashar al-Assad in heavy fighting around key state buildings, eventually driving out the army. Rebels seized control of the main square in the city on 4 March, and symbolically tore down a large golden statue of Syria's former president Hafez al-Assad, late father of the current president.

Although, according to al-Akhbar, the city (which had been surrounded on four sides by checkpoints) did not fall militarily, pointing out that, despite not having a formidable Syrian Army deployment, it was not normal that Raqqa fell in hours. The Lebanese newspaper reported that the morning of the attack Syrian forces manning the eastern checkpoint pulled out, handing over the city's eastern entrance—and the entire eastern district—to the fighters of the Muntasir Billah Brigade and al-Nusra, while officers of the Syrian military police and the Hajana—the border guard—were seen moving their equipment, without any harassment from the opposition fighters, from the center of the city to the headquarters of the 17th Division, before the opposition brigades advance.

Rebels also stormed the residence of the provincial governor Hassan Jalali, reportedly capturing him along with the head of the Raqqa Governorate branch of the Baath Party, Suleiman al-Suleiman.

Government forces retreated from the city westwards and eastwards, and also remained 60 km from the city at the provincial airport. The Syrian Air Force carried out airstrikes against rebels in the city after its fall.

On 5 March, footage emerged of both Hasan Jalali and Suleiman al-Suleiman surrounded by jubilant rebel fighters.

Ahrar al-Sham (part of the Syrian Islamic Front), al-Qaeda's al-Nusra Front, and the Hudhayfah ibn al-Yaman Brigade were the main rebel groups involved in the battle. Several groups affiliated with the Free Syrian Army were also involved.

Among those killed in the fighting were also the top al-Nusra commander for Raqqa governorate, as well as the main provincial Ahrar ash-Sham field commander. Raqqa's police chief was also killed. Some residents pleaded with rebels not to enter the city, fearing it would bring retribution from government forces.

The last pockets of government resistance in the city were eliminated on 6 March, when rebels seized several key security buildings where loyalist troops were hiding, prompting the activist group Syrian Observatory for Human Rights to officially declare that Raqqa was fully under rebel control. The Syrian Air Force conducted 25 air-strikes against the city in an attempt to dislodge the opposition forces. In total, 39 people were killed, including 17 in a strike on a square. At least 10 of those killed were confirmed as rebel fighters.

== Aftermath ==
Following the rebel capture of Raqqa, the Syrian Army sent army reinforcements from Tabqa military airport, but the Syrian Observatory for Human Rights reported rebels had intercepted them.

Some of the captured government troops were publicly executed by the Islamist factions after the takeover, with their bodies put on display or dragged through the city streets.

On 10 March, further government air strikes on the city left another 14 people dead.

Situation in Raqqa, mid-March 2013, showing the siege of the 17th Division base

On 4 April 2013, it was reported that rebels of the Free Syrian Army and allied Islamist groups besieging the 17th Division base outside Raqqa city were in control of three quarters of the base with the Syrian Army holding the command centre. A Syrian Arab Army source at the base reported that 80 soldiers had been killed and 250 injured in the fighting, and that many injured troops had died of gangrene.

On 19 May, Syria's Raqqa opposition chief, Abdallah al-Khalil, was kidnapped, according to the Syrian Observatory for Human Rights. Khalil was reportedly stopped by five armed gunmen wearing black masks in a black Kia Rio while in his car in eastern Raqqa. The gunmen accused him of being an Alawite and collaborating with the Syrian government before kidnapping him. Although no group claimed responsibility for the kidnapping, it is believed that ISIL planned and executed the operation. In 2017, notes from ISIL militants tracking Khalil in 2013 were obtained, pointing to ISIL as the likely culprit behind his kidnapping. Khalil's kidnapping was considered a crucial event for Raqqa's fate, as he was seen as the only respected intermediary by all Syrian opposition parties in the city at the time. Immediately after the kidnapping, the Syrian Observatory for Human Rights released the statement: "The Observatory condemns in the strongest terms the abduction of opposition lawyer Abdallah al-Khalil, and demands his immediate release."

As of 28 May, air raids and artillery strikes continued against rebel lines on the outskirts of the city, but government forces were still unable to break through the lines.

In mid-August, the Islamic State of Iraq and the Levant (ISIL) announced that they would stop participating in the siege of the 17th Division, one of the two last remaining government bases in Raqqa Governorate. They wanted to focus on civil administration instead, in building an Islamic state, and so they would withdraw their fighters from the most urgent battlefields.

By early November 2013, ISIL was in partial control of the town. By January 6, 2014, the opposition rebels had ousted ISIL from the city as part of the Syrian opposition–Islamic State conflict.

On 9 January 2014, fighting raged between ISIL jihadists and the opposition on Thursday, the Great Britain-based Observatory claimed. "The opposition forces have taken control of the strategic political intelligence building, which had been under ISIL control and is just 400 meters from the jihadists' headquarters," Abdel Rahman said. "But ISIL still controls the bridges leading into the city, so people have to take boats to get in." By 12 January, ISIL fighters had recaptured much of the key points in the city. By 14 January, ISIL had ousted the rebels from Raqqa and secured complete control of the city.

On 25 July 2014, ISIL took control of the 17th Division base after capturing it from the Syrian Army.

On 28 August 2014 after a 36-day general offensive, the Tabqa airbase was captured by ISIL with significant losses on both sides.

== See also ==
- Battle of Aleppo (2012–2016)
- Battle of Idlib (2015)
- Northern Raqqa offensive
- Raqqa campaign (2016–2017)

== Bibliography ==
- Winter, Lucas (2014). Raqqa: From Regime Overthrow to Inter-Rebel Fighting by Lucas Winter. Foreign Military Studies Office.
