= Battle of Raqqa =

Battle of Raqqa may refer to:

- Battle of Raqqa (1783)
- Battle of Raqqa (2013), between Syrian opposition forces and the Syrian government
- Battle of Raqqa (2017), between Syrian Democratic Forces and the Islamic State
