= Al-Karamah, Raqqa Governorate =

Al-Karamah الكرامة
- Town
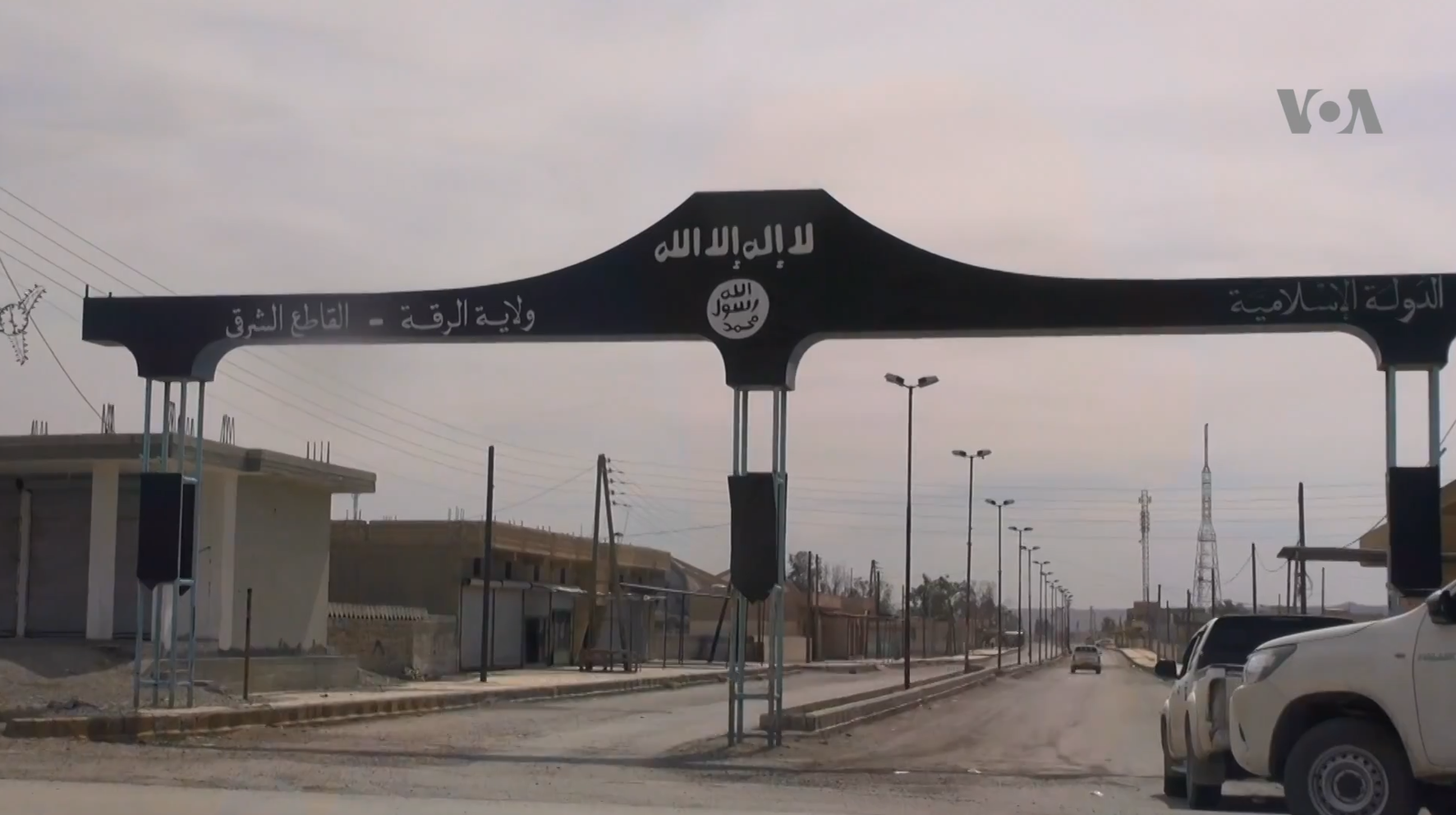
- Al-Karamah, after the SDF had captured it from ISIS during the Raqqa campaign (2016–2017).

- Location in Syria
- Coordinates: 35°52′17″N 39°16′54″E
- Country: Syria
- Governorate: Raqqa
- District: Raqqa
- Subdistrict: al-Karamah

Population (2004)
  - Total: 7,034
- Time zone: UTC+3 (AST)
- City Qrya Pcode: C5766

Al-Karamah (Arabic: الكرامة) is a Syrian town located in Raqqa District, 26 km east of Raqqa city. According to the Syria Central Bureau of Statistics (CBS), Al-Karamah had a population of 7,034 in the 2004 census. It was captured by ISIS and recovered by the SDF in 2017.
