= Uğurtaş, Akçakale =

Uğurtaş
- Neighbourhood
- Location in Turkey Uğurtaş (Şanlıurfa)
- Coordinates: 36°51′46″N 38°38′08″E
- Country: Turkey
- Province: Şanlıurfa
- District: Akçakale
- Population (2022): 318
- Time zone: UTC+3 (TRT)

Uğurtaş (also: Kubik) is a neighbourhood of the municipality and district of Akçakale, Şanlıurfa Province, Turkey. Its population is 318 (2022).
