= Mohammed al-Qahtani (disambiguation) =

Mohammed al-Qahtani (born 1975) is a Saudi Arabian Guantanamo detainee.

Mohammed al-Qahtani (Arabic: محمد القحطاني) may also refer to:

- Mohammad Fahad al-Qahtani (born 1965/1966), Saudi Arabian economics professor
- Mohammed Saleh Al Qahtani, Bahraini Board Member of the Boy Scouts of Bahrain
- Mohammed al-Qahtani (football) (born 2002), Saudi Arabian footballer
- Mohammed Qahtani, Saudi Arabian speaker and security engineer
- Nayif Mohammed al-Qahtani (25 March 1988 – c. 2010), Saudi Arabian jihadist and propagandist

== See also ==
- Qahtan (disambiguation)
