= Ma'adan =

Ma'adan معدان
- Town
- Location in Syria
- Coordinates: 35°44′53″N 39°36′25″E
- Country: Syria
- Governorate: Raqqa
- District: Raqqa
- Subdistrict: Maadan

Population (2004)
  - Total: 8,663
- Time zone: UTC+3 (AST)
- City Qrya Pcode: C5787

Ma'adan (Arabic: معدان) is a Syrian town in Raqqa District, Raqqa. According to the Syria Central Bureau of Statistics (CBS), Ma'adan had a population of 8,663 in the 2004 census.

== Syrian civil war ==
Ma'adan was captured by rebel forces in the Raqqa campaign (2012–13) during the Syrian Civil War. ISIL, which had participated in the fighting against Syrian government forces in the Raqqa governate, wrested control of the region, including Ma'adan, from other rebel forces in January 2014. Three and a half years later, though the town was still under ISIL control, ISIL's position in the Syrian Civil War had deteriorated significantly such that it was in danger of losing the entire governate of Raqqa. Ma'adan became an important stronghold used by the organisation during the Central Syria campaign (2017). Syrian government forces encountered significant resistance at Ma'adan when they attempted to advance on the town in mid-August, and consequently bypassed the town in their approach to Deir ez Zor. However, on 24 August ISIL forces launched a large-scale operation west of Ma'adan alongside the western bank of the Euphrates, capturing seven villages from the Syrian Army and allied tribal fighters. Overall, government forces were pushed back 30 kilometers from the western outskirts of Ma'adan. Nearly a month later, on 23 September 2017, Ma'adan was liberated by the Syrian government's Tiger Forces during their offensive from the south east. This removed the last of ISIL's territory on the west bank of the Euphrates, north of Deir ez-Zor.
