= Maadan Subdistrict =

Maadan Subdistrict ناحية معدان
- Subdistrict
- Location of Maadan Subdistrict within Raqqa Governorate

- Location in Syria
- Coordinates (Ma'adan): 35.748°N 39.607°E
- Country: Syria
- Governorate: Raqqa
- District: Raqqa District
- Seat: Ma'adan

Population (2004)
  - Total: 42,652
- Geocode: SY110103

Maadan Subdistrict or Maadan Nahiyah (Arabic: ناحية معدان) is a Syrian Nahiyah (Subdistrict) located in Raqqa District in Raqqa. According to the Syria Central Bureau of Statistics (CBS), Maadan Subdistrict had a population of 42,652 in the 2004 census.
