= Al-Sabkhah Subdistrict =

Al-Sabkhah Subdistrict ناحية السبخة
- Subdistrict
- Location of Al-Sabkhah Subdistrict within Raqqa Governorate

- Location in Syria
- Coordinates (Al-Sabkhah): 35.81°N 39.26°E
- Country: Syria
- Governorate: Raqqa
- District: Raqqa District
- Seat: Al-Sabkhah

Population (2004)
  - Total: 48,106
- Geocode: SY110101

Al-Sabkhah Subdistrict or Al-Sabkhah Nahiyah (Arabic: ناحية السبخة) is a Syrian Nahiyah (Subdistrict) located in Raqqa District in Raqqa. According to the Syria Central Bureau of Statistics (CBS), Al-Sabkhah Subdistrict had a population of 48,106 in the 2004 census.
