= Ak-Mechet =

Ak-Mechet (White Mosque) may refer to:

- Kyzylorda, called Ak-Mechet before 1853, a city in Kazakhstan
- Chornomorske, called Ak-Mechet before 1944, an urban-type settlement in Crimea

== See also ==
- White Mosque (disambiguation)
