= Ayn Issa Subdistrict =

Subdistrict in Raqqa Governorate, Syria

Ayn Issa Subdistrict ناحية عين عيسى
- Subdistrict
- Location of Ayn Issa Subdistrict within Raqqa Governorate

- Location in Syria
- Coordinates (Ayn Issa): 36.4297°N 38.8406°E
- Country: Syria
- Governorate: Raqqa
- District: Tell Abyad District
- Seat: Ayn Issa

Population (2004)
  - Total: 40,912
- Geocode: SY110202

Ayn Issa Subdistrict or Ayn Issa Nahiyah (Arabic: ناحية عين عيسى) is a Syrian Nahiyah (Subdistrict) located in Tell Abyad District in Raqqa. According to the Syria Central Bureau of Statistics (CBS), Ayn Issa Subdistrict had a population of 40,912 in the 2004 census.
