= Al-Sabkhah =

Al-Sabkhah السبخة
- Town
- Location in Syria
- Coordinates: 35°48′37″N 39°15′50″E
- Country: Syria
- Governorate: Raqqa
- District: Raqqa
- Subdistrict: al-Sabkhah

Population (2004)
  - Total: 11,567
- Time zone: UTC+3 (AST)
- City Qrya Pcode: C5747

Al-Sabkhah (Arabic: السبخة) is a Syrian town located in Raqqa District, Raqqa. According to the Syria Central Bureau of Statistics (CBS), Al-Sabkhah had a population of 11,567 in the 2004 census.
