= September 2012 Aleppo bombing =

Terrorist incident in Syria

Coordinates: 36°11′58″N 37°08′05″E

September 2012 Aleppo bombings
- Part of Syrian Civil War
- Location: Aleppo, Syria
- Date: 9 September 2012; 20:00 (UTC+3)
- Target: Al-Hayat hospital near the 7 April Stadium
- Attack type: suicide car bomb
- Deaths: 32 (2 security personnel, 30 civilian)
- Injuries: 64
- Perpetrator: Syrian Armed Forces

On 9 September 2012, car bomb exploded at the Saad al-Ansari district of the Syrian city of Aleppo, targeting al-Hayat hospital near the 7 April Stadium. 30 civilians and 2 members of the security forces were killed and at least 64 people were injured as a result of the car bomb blast.

== See also ==
- List of bombings during the Syrian Civil War
