= Al-Qahtaniyah, Raqqa Governorate =

Al-Qahtaniya القحطانية
- Village
- Location in Syria
- Coordinates: 35°59′37″N 38°55′52″E
- Country: Syria
- Governorate: Raqqa Governorate
- District: Raqqa District
- Nahiyah: Raqqa

Population (2004 census)
  - Total: 2,490
- Time zone: UTC+3 (AST)

Al-Qahtaniya (Arabic: القحطانية) is a village in northern Syria, administratively part of Raqqa Governorate, located just northwest of Raqqa. According to the Syria Central Bureau of Statistics (CBS), al-Qahtaniya had a population of 2,490 in the 2004 census.

On 26 December 2012, during the Syrian civil war, Syrian opposition activists reported that 20 people, among them children, were killed in the village of al-Qahtaniyah by Syrian army tank shells.
