= Hajar Abyad =

Hajar Abyad حجر الابيض
- Village
- Location in Syria
- Coordinates: 34°41′17″N 36°14′24″E
- Country: Syria
- Governorate: Homs
- District: Talkalakh
- Subdistrict: Hawash

Population (2004)
  - Total: 351
- Time zone: UTC+2 (EET)
  - Summer (DST): +3

Hajar Abyad (Arabic: حجر الابيض; also spelled Hajar al-Abyad) is a village in northern Syria located west of Homs in the Homs Governorate. According to the Syria Central Bureau of Statistics, Hajar Abyad had a population of 351 in the 2004 census. Its inhabitants are predominantly Alawites.
