= Jeb Abyad =

Jeb Abyad - Byud جب الأبيض
- Village
- Location in Syria
- Coordinates: 35.137080°N 37.463592°E
- Country: Syria
- Governorate: Hama
- District: Salamiyah District
- Subdistrict: Uqayribat Subdistrict

Population (2004)
  - Total: 371
- Time zone: UTC+3 (AST)
- City Qrya Pcode: C3324

Jeb Abyad - Byud (Arabic: جب الأبيض) is a Syrian village located in Uqayribat Subdistrict in Salamiyah District, Hama. According to the Syria Central Bureau of Statistics (CBS), Jeb Abyad - Byud had a population of 371 in the 2004 census.

== Syrian Civil War ==
On 12 June 2013, the settlement was bombed by regime forces, killing five people.
