= Al-Karamah Subdistrict =

Al-Karamah Subdistrict ناحية الكرامة
- Subdistrict
- Location of Al-Karamah Subdistrict within Raqqa Governorate

- Location in Syria
- Coordinates (Al-Karamah): 35.87°N 39.28°E
- Country: Syria
- Governorate: Raqqa
- District: Raqqa District
- Seat: Al-Karamah

Population (2004)
  - Total: 74,429
- Geocode: SY110102

Al-Karamah Subdistrict or Al-Karamah Nahiyah (Arabic: ناحية الكرامة) is a Syrian Nahiyah (Subdistrict) located in Raqqa District in Raqqa. According to the Syria Central Bureau of Statistics (CBS), Al-Karamah Subdistrict had a population of 74,429 in the 2004 census.
