= Trechus suluk =

Scientific classification
- Kingdom: Animalia
- Phylum: Arthropoda
- Class: Insecta
- Order: Coleoptera
- Suborder: Adephaga
- Family: Carabidae
- Genus: Trechus
- Species: T. suluk

Binomial name
- Trechus suluk Belousov & Kabak, 1996

Species of beetle

Trechus suluk is a species of ground beetle in the subfamily Trechinae. It was described by Belousov & Kabak in 1996.
