= Raqqa District =

Raqqa District منطقة مركز الرقة
- District
- Location of Raqqa District within Raqqa Governorate

- Location in Syria
- Coordinates (Raqqa): 35.95°N 39.02°E
- Country: Syria
- Governorate: Raqqa
- Seat: Raqqa
- Subdistricts: 4 nawāḥī

Area
  - Total: 7,327.92 km^{2} (2,829.33 sq mi)

Population (2004)
  - Total: 503,960
  - Density: 68.773/km^{2} (178.12/sq mi)
- Geocode: SY1101

Raqqa District (Arabic: منطقة مركز الرقة, romanized: Manṭiqat ar-Raqqah) is a district of the Raqqa Governorate in northern Syria. The administrative centre is the city of Raqqa. At the 2004 census, the district had a population of 503,960.

Subdistricts of Raqqa District

The administrative center of Raqqa Subdistrict shown above is the city of Raqqa.

The administrative center of Al-Karamah Subdistrict shown above is the city of Al-Karamah.

The administrative center of Al-Sabkhah Subdistrict shown above is the city of Al-Sabkhah.

The administrative center of Maadan Subdistrict shown above is the city of Ma'adan.

== Sub-districts ==
The district of Raqqa is divided into four subdistricts or nawāḥī (population as of 2004):

- Raqqa Subdistrict (ناحية الرقّة): population 338,773.
- Al-Sabkhah Subdistrict (ناحية السبخة): population 48,106
- Al-Karamah Subdistrict (ناحية الكرامة): population 74,429.
- Maadan Subdistrict (ناحية معدان): population 42,652.
