= Tell Abyad Subdistrict =

Tell Abyad Subdistrict ناحية تل أبيض Nahiye Girê Spî
- Subdistrict
- Location of Tell Abyad Subdistrict within Raqqa Governorate

- Location in Syria
- Coordinates (Tell Abyad): 36.698°N 38.957°E
- Country: Syria
- Governorate: Raqqa
- District: Tell Abyad District
- Seat: Tell Abyad

Population (2004)
  - Total: 44,671
- Geocode: SY110200

Tell Abyad Subdistrict or Tell Abyad Nahiyah (Arabic: ناحية تل أبيض; Kurdish: Nahiye Girê Spî) is a Syrian nahiyah (subdistrict) located in Tell Abyad District in Raqqa. According to the Syria Central Bureau of Statistics (CBS), Tell Abyad Subdistrict had a population of 44,671 in the 2004 census. The subdistrict's administrative center (seat) is the town of Tell Abyad and is controlled by the Syrian Interim Government.
