= White Mosque =

White Mosque may refer to:

- White Mosque, Berat, a ruined building in Albania
- White Mosque, Nazareth, a 19th-century mosque in Nazareth, Israel
- White Mosque, Ramla, an 8th-century mosque in Ramla, Israel
- White Mosque (Srebrenica), a 17th-century mosque in Srebrenica, Bosnia and Herzegovina
- Abidin Mosque, in Kuala Terengganu, Malaysia
- Jezzar Pasha Mosque, also known as the White Mosque of Acre, an 18th-century mosque in Acre
- Nurulla Mosque, in Kazan, Russia
- Šerefudin's White Mosque, a 15th-century mosque in Visoko, Bosnia and Herzegovina
- Al-Aqsa Library's former name

== See also ==
- Ak-Mechet (disambiguation)
