= Akçakale =

- District and municipality
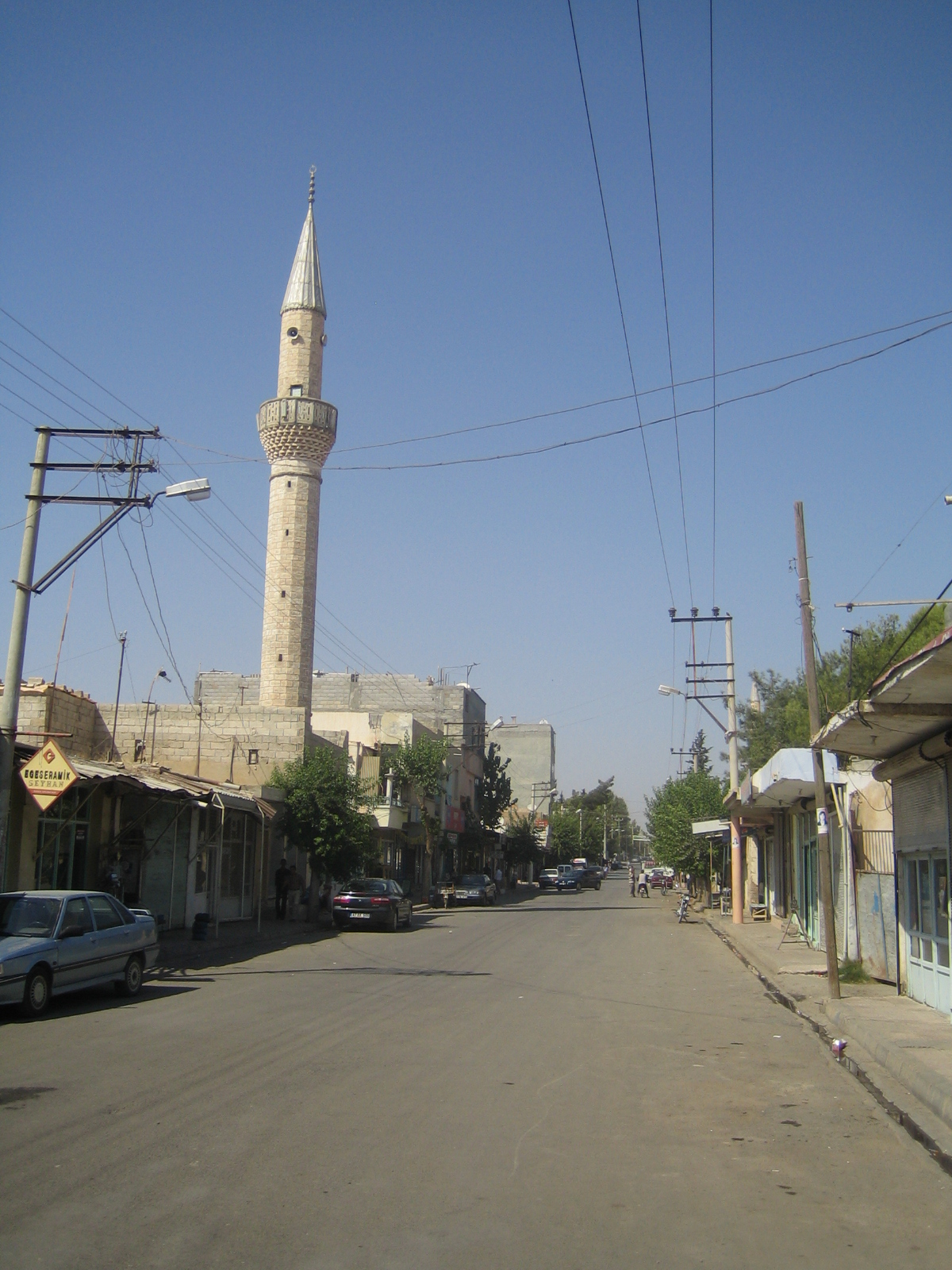

- Logo

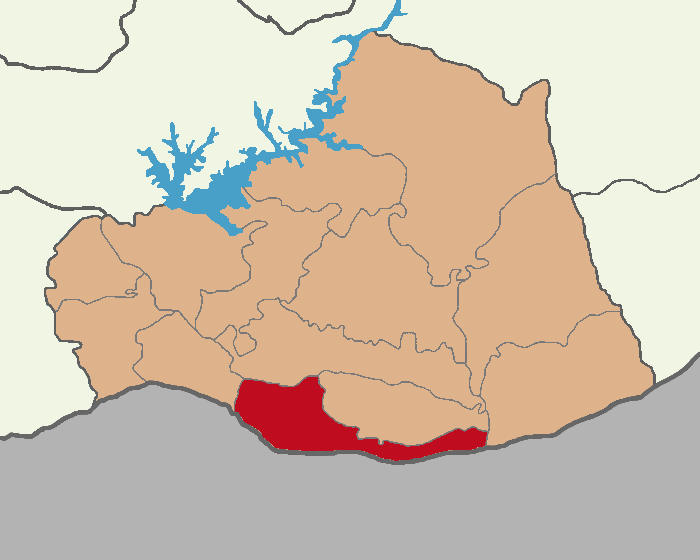
- Map showing Akçakale District in Şanlıurfa Province

- Location within Turkey Location within Şanlıurfa
- Coordinates: 36°42′39″N 38°56′52″E
- Country: Turkey
- Province: Şanlıurfa

Government
  - Mayor: Mehmet Yalçınkaya (AKP)
- Area: 1,038 km^{2} (401 sq mi)
- Elevation: 360 m (1,180 ft)
- Population (2022): 123,721
  - Density: 119.2/km^{2} (308.7/sq mi)
- Time zone: UTC+3 (TRT)
- Postal code: 63500
- Area code: 0414
- Website: www.akcakale.bel.tr

Akçakale (Arabic: أقجة قلعة) is a municipality and district of Şanlıurfa Province, Turkey. Its area is 1,038 km^{2}, and its population is 123,721 (2022).

Akçakale forms a divided city with Tell Abyad in Syria, maintaining a border crossing. The Mayor is Mehmet Yalçınkaya (AKP). The current District Governor is Onur Şan.

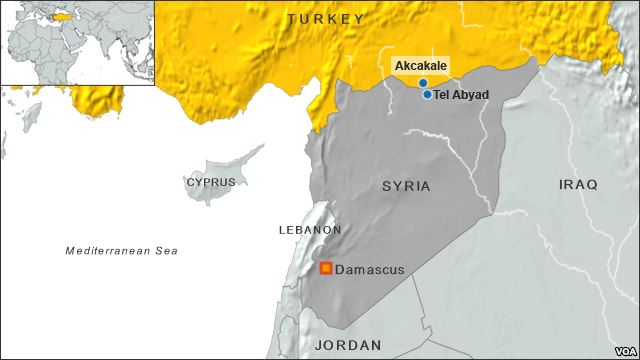
Border towns of Akçakale in Turkey and Tal Abyad in Syria.

== Syrian Civil War ==
On October 3, 2012, Akçakale was hit by shells from across the Syrian border in Tell Abyad, killing five civilians. In October 2014, there was an Islamic State in Iraq and the Levant presence in the town, due to the porous nature of the border at that time between Akçakale and Tell Abyad, which was then part of the Islamic State.

== Geography ==
There are 120 neighbourhoods in Akçakale District:

- Acıkuyu
- Adnan Menderes
- Akbilek
- Akçaköy
- Akçalı
- Akdiken
- Akkeçi
- Aksahrınç
- Alatlar
- Alıncak
- Arıcan
- Aşağı Beğdeş
- Aşağı Çinpolat
- Aşağıderen
- Aslanlı
- Atatürk
- Aydınlı
- Ayranlı
- Ayyıldız
- Baykuş
- Bilece
- Bolatlar
- Boybeyi
- Buket
- Bulutlu
- Büyücek
- Büyük Naneli
- Büyüktaş
- Büyüktokaç
- Çakırlar
- Cevher
- Ceylanlı
- Çokalan
- Çömlekçi
- Çukurca
- Deniz
- Dibek
- Donandı
- Dorumali
- Düzce
- Edebey
- Eke
- Ekinyazı
- Erdemler
- Erecek
- Fatih Sultan Mehmet
- Fevzi Çakmak
- Fişenge
- Geçittepe
- Gölbaşı
- Gülveren
- Gündaş
- Güneren
- Güvenç
- Hacıekber
- Hürriyet
- İkizce
- İncedere
- Karatepe
- Kayaca
- Kayalık
- Keçili
- Kelebek
- Kepezli
- Kılıçlı
- Kırmıtlı
- Koruklu
- Köseören
- Küçük Hacıekber
- Kurudere
- Mavitaş
- Menzil
- Mermer
- Milköy
- Narlıova
- Nimet
- Nusretiye
- Ohali
- Okaylar
- Öncül
- Onortak
- Ortaderen
- Ortaören
- Osmanlı
- Pekmezli
- Şahinler
- Şahinsoylu
- Sakça
- Salihler
- Şanlı
- Şefkat
- Şehitnusretbey
- Sevimli
- Seyrantepe
- Sınırgören
- Süleymanşah
- Taşkınlar
- Tatlıca
- Topçu
- Turgut Özal
- Tuzluca
- Uğraklı
- Uğurhan
- Uğurtaş
- Vize
- Yağmuralan
- Yalınlı
- Yazlıca
- Yediyol
- Yeni
- Yenişehir
- Yeşerti
- Yukarı Beğdeş
- Yukarı Çinpolat
- Yukarı Çukurca
- Yukarıderen
- Yusufbey
- Zenginova
- Zeytindalı
- Zorlu

Akçakale is at the southern end of the State road D.885.

=== Climate ===
Akçakale has a hot semi-arid climate (Köppen climate classification: BSh).

Climate data for Akçakale (1991–2020)
Month	Jan	Feb	Mar	Apr	May	Jun	Jul	Aug	Sep	Oct	Nov	Dec	Year
Mean daily maximum °C (°F)	11.4 (52.5)	13.6 (56.5)	18.3 (64.9)	24.1 (75.4)	30.5 (86.9)	36.5 (97.7)	40.1 (104.2)	39.6 (103.3)	35.0 (95.0)	28.6 (83.5)	19.7 (67.5)	13.2 (55.8)	25.9 (78.6)
Daily mean °C (°F)	6.0 (42.8)	7.6 (45.7)	11.7 (53.1)	16.7 (62.1)	22.8 (73.0)	28.6 (83.5)	31.7 (89.1)	30.9 (87.6)	26.2 (79.2)	20.3 (68.5)	12.4 (54.3)	7.5 (45.5)	18.6 (65.5)
Mean daily minimum °C (°F)	1.1 (34.0)	2.0 (35.6)	4.9 (40.8)	9.1 (48.4)	14.1 (57.4)	18.9 (66.0)	21.9 (71.4)	21.1 (70.0)	16.7 (62.1)	12.1 (53.8)	5.9 (42.6)	2.6 (36.7)	10.9 (51.6)
Average precipitation mm (inches)	43.22 (1.70)	39.64 (1.56)	38.35 (1.51)	28.44 (1.12)	22.15 (0.87)	1.31 (0.05)	0.93 (0.04)	0.06 (0.00)	2.36 (0.09)	16.62 (0.65)	37.63 (1.48)	46.38 (1.83)	277.09 (10.91)
Average precipitation days (≥ 1.0 mm)	6.4	6.4	5.6	4.3	3.1	1.5	2.0	1.0	1.6	2.8	4.3	6.1	45.1
Average relative humidity (%)	72.1	70.1	64.1	59.8	48.2	38.6	38.8	42.7	45.8	52.2	61.7	71.3	55.4
Source: NOAA

== Sport ==
The Akçakale Belediyespor plays in the Akçakale ilçe Stadium and competes currently in the Turkish amateur league.
