= Suluk Subdistrict =

Suluk Subdistrict ناحية سلوك
- Subdistrict
- Location of Suluk Subdistrict within Raqqa Governorate

- Location in Syria
- Coordinates (Suluk): 36.5992°N 39.1286°E
- Country: Syria
- Governorate: Raqqa
- District: Tell Abyad District
- Seat: Suluk

Population (2004)
  - Total: 44,131
- Geocode: SY110201

Suluk Subdistrict or Suluk Nahiyah (Arabic: ناحية سلوك) is a Syrian Nahiyah (Subdistrict) located in Tell Abyad District in Raqqa. According to the Syria Central Bureau of Statistics (CBS), Suluk Subdistrict had a population of 44,131 in the 2004 census.
