= Suluk, Syria =

Town in Syria

Suluk سلوك سلوك Silûk
- Town
- Suluk nahiya within Raqqa Governorate

- Location in Syria
- Coordinates: 36.5992°N 39.1286°E
- Country: Syria
- Governorate: Raqqa
- District: Tell Abyad
- Subdistrict: Suluk

Population (2004)
  - Town: 7,825
  - Subdistrict: 44,131
- Time zone: UTC+3 (AST)
- P-Code: C5843
- Geocode: SY110201
- City Qrya Pcode: C5843

Suluk (Arabic: سلوك, romanized: Sulūk, Kurdish: Silûk) is a town within the Tell Abyad District of Raqqa Governorate in Syria. Suluk is close to the border with Turkey. The population of the town is predominantly Arab.

== History ==
In the early 13th century, during Ayyubid rule, the medieval geographer Yaqut al-Hamawi noted that Suluk was "a town of Syria".

=== Syrian civil war ===
In June 2015, Suluk was taken over by the Kurdish People's Protection Units (YPG) in the course of their Tell Abyad offensive. Kurdish YPG forces were accused of expelling the entire population of the town (35,000 people), although they allowed only 10,000 of them to return, Furthermore, Amnesty International accused YPG of "razing" nearby villages, and "ethnic cleansing" of Arabs. They have denied the Amnesty report, calling it "biased, unprofessional and politicized" as it made no mention of the human rights violations by the Islamic State.

On 27 February 2016, fighters of the Islamic State attacked Suluk, the village Hammam at‑Turkuman and Tall Abyad. At this point, the towns were not directly at the front to ISIL-held territory anymore and the jihadists were able to expel the Kurdish People's Protection Units in this surprise attack from Suluk and Hammam at-Turkuman. Kurdish security forces soon were able to encircle the attackers and recaptured the villages on March 3, 2016. One day before the recapture, IS jihadists executed 15 civilians with the charge of "Refusing to corporate with IS and helping the YPG earlier".

According to the Syrian Observatory for Human Rights, 70 fighters from the Islamic State and 20 Kurdish fighters were killed during the clashes.

A spokesman of the YPG, Redur Xelil, accused Turkey of supporting the terrorists because some of them infiltrated from the Turkish border to the north. Turkey denied the accusations.

During the Turkish offensive in north-east Syria in October 2019, Suluk was captured by Turkey and the Syrian National Army.

== Climate ==
Climate data for Suluk
Month	Jan	Feb	Mar	Apr	May	Jun	Jul	Aug	Sep	Oct	Nov	Dec	Year
Mean daily maximum °C (°F)	10.7 (51.3)	13.1 (55.6)	17.7 (63.9)	23.4 (74.1)	29.9 (85.8)	35.7 (96.3)	39.2 (102.6)	38.8 (101.8)	34.6 (94.3)	27.7 (81.9)	19.5 (67.1)	12.5 (54.5)	25.2 (77.4)
Mean daily minimum °C (°F)	1.2 (34.2)	2.2 (36.0)	5.1 (41.2)	9.1 (48.4)	13.8 (56.8)	18.3 (64.9)	21.1 (70.0)	20.6 (69.1)	16.1 (61.0)	11.1 (52.0)	5.7 (42.3)	2.6 (36.7)	10.6 (51.1)
Average rainfall mm (inches)	60 (2.4)	46 (1.8)	44 (1.7)	35 (1.4)	25 (1.0)	3 (0.1)	0 (0)	0 (0)	1 (0.0)	17 (0.7)	31 (1.2)	52 (2.0)	314 (12.3)
Source: Climate-Data
