= Tell Abyad =

Town in Raqqa, northern Syria

Tell Abyad تَلّ أَبْيَض Girê Spî
- Town
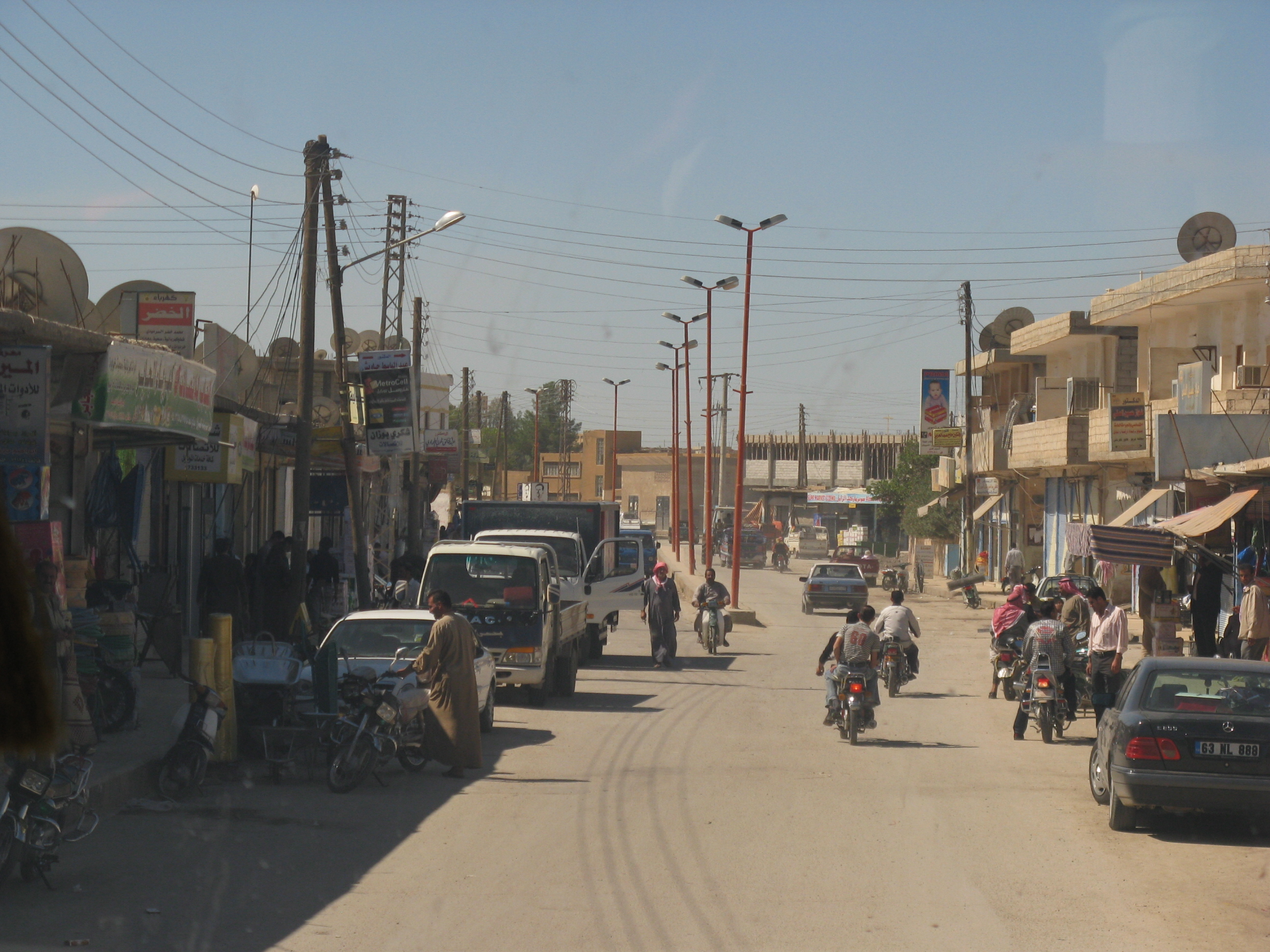
- Tell Abyad, 2009

- Location in Syria
- Coordinates: 36°41′51″N 38°57′24″E
- Country: Syria
- Governorate: Raqqa
- District: Tell Abyad
- Subdistrict: Tell Abyad

Area
  - Town: 0,386 km^{2} (149 sq mi)
- Elevation: 350 m (1,150 ft)

Population (2004 census)
  - Town: 14,825
  - Nahiyah: 44,671
- Time zone: UTC+3 (AST)
- P-Code: C5792
- Geocode: SY110200

Tell Abyad (Note: Arabic: تَلّ أَبْيَض, romanized: Tall Abyaḍ, lit. 'White Hill'; Kurdish: گرێ سپی, romanized: Girê Spî; Armenian: Թել Աբյադ; Syriac: ܬܠ ܐܒܝܕ.) also spelled Tal Abyad, is a town in northern Syria. It is the administrative center of the Tell Abyad District within the Raqqa Governorate. Located along the Balikh River, it constitutes a divided city with the bordering city of Akçakale in Turkey.

== History ==
In antiquity, Tell Abyad and the surrounding region were ruled by the Assyrian Empire and settled by Arameans. Tell Abyad could have been the site of the neo-Assyrian–era Aramean inhabited settlement of Baliḫu, mentioned in 814 BC. Later, various empires ruled the area, such as the Romans, Byzantines, Sassanids, Umayyads, Abbasids and finally the Ottoman Empire. Tell Abyad remained Ottoman until the end of World War I, when it was incorporated in the French mandate of Syria during the partition of the Ottoman Empire.

The modern town was founded by French mandate authorities to control the border with Turkey, with first inhabitants being Armenian refugees from Anatolia, survivors of the deportations conducted during the Armenian genocide, with around 250 Armenian families living in the city prior to the Syrian civil war. After Armenians, the Baggara Arab tribe, originally from Deir ez-Zor, arrived as members of the French Army of the Levant, and decided to settle in the area.

=== Syrian civil war ===
After the Syrian civil war started in 2011, Tell Abyad was captured by the Free Syrian Army in September 2012, On July 30, 2013, Tell Abyad was captured by the Islamic State of Iraq and the Levant (ISIL), who raised their flag at the border crossing with Turkey. After ISIL defeated the Kurdish forces, the YPG and Kurdish Front, ISIL fighters announced from the minarets of the local mosques that all Kurds had to leave Tell Abyad or else be killed. Thousands of civilians, including Turkmen and Arab families, fled on 21 July. ISIL fighters systematically looted and destroyed the property of Kurds and resettled displaced Arab Sunni families from the Qalamoun area (Rif Damascus), Deir ez-Zor, and Raqqa in abandoned Kurdish homes. According to Liz Sly of the Washington Post, ISIL also collected a tax from the Christians, a so called Jizya of about $100 every six months. While ISIL controlled the border towards Turkey in Tell Abyad, it was a major source for supplies coming in from Turkey.

On July 21, 2013, the sounds of the minarets suddenly rose from the mosques of Tal Abyad, broadcasting a message calling on Kurdish civilians to leave their homes within a period of “10” minutes, and thus the city witnessed the largest forced displacement process.

In the June 2015 Tell Abyad Campaign against the Islamic State, the town was besieged and in June 2015 taken over by forces of the Euphrates Volcano, the Kurdish YPG and their allies within the Free Syrian Army.

==== Autonomous Administration of North and East Syria ====
After the capture of the Tell Abyad district, Kurdish YPG fighters have been accused by Syrian rebels of deliberately displacing thousands of Arabs and Turkmens from the areas they captured from ISIL forces in northern Syria — a charge strongly denied by the Kurds. The accusation was not backed by any evidence of ethnic or sectarian killings. The head of Syrian Observatory for Human Rights said the people who had fled into Turkey were escaping fighting and there was no systematic effort to force people out. A report published by KurdWatch also accused the PYD of displacements while Liz Sly of the Washington Post reported:

"The Kurds formally renamed Tal Abyad with a Kurdish name, "Gire Spi", and proclaim its new identity in signs throughout the town — written in the Latin script used by Turkish Kurds but not readily understood by Syrian Kurds or Arabs. They have also unilaterally detached it from the existing Syrian province of Raqqa and made it a part of their newly formed autonomous enclave, carved from areas traditionally inhabited by Kurds but steadily encroaching also on territories that were historically Arab."

According to KurdWatch, repressive measures have been taken out in first line against persons with ties to the Islamic State or other political opponents.

However, many of the tens of thousands of Arab residents — namely those tribes that allegedly took part in the expulsion of the local Kurdish population in 2013 — who fled the advancing Kurdish force have not returned, for fear of retribution from the YPG. There were reports that Kurds were forcibly removing the local Arab population, but the accusations were rejected by local Kurdish officials as well as the United Nations.

The Tell Abyad canton was established on 21 October 2015 and included into the de facto autonomous Autonomous Administration of North and East Syria (AANES), declared by a council including representatives of local Arab, Kurdish, Turkmen and Armenian communities. The entity was neither formally recognized by the Syrian Government of Bashar al-Assad nor by any other country of the United Nations. The 178-member higher council that governed Tell Abyad, elected mixed-gender co-mayors, as mandated under Rojava rules. The elected co-mayors were ethnic Arab Mansour Seloum (later elected co-chairperson for the executive committee to organize a new constitution for Rojava, and replaced by ethnic Arab Hamdan al-Abad) and ethnic Kurd Layla Mohammed. The latter was 27 years old and the first female mayor of Tell Abyad ever. Schools in which Arabs and Kurds each could learn in their own language were set up during their administration.

On 27 February 2016, Tell Abyad came under attack from ISIL militants. YPG militias and Asayish police forces repelled the attack and eliminated all of the ISIL militants, but more than 40 security forces and around 20 civilians were left dead. A YPG spokesman claimed that ISIL militants had crossed from Turkey to attack the town. Turkey quickly denied this claim. According to the Syrian Observatory for Human Rights, there was not any infiltration from the Turkish border but dormant IS sleeper cells and others entered the town on the eve of the offensive dressed in YPG uniforms. There have been multiple other instances of ISIL terror attacks in Tell Abyad, for example on 29 June and 8 July 2016 two bombings that each claimed ten civilian lives.

On 15 September 2016, the flag of the United States was raised over several public institutional buildings in Tell Abyad. The United States Department of Defense confirmed that U.S. Special Operation Forces were flying U.S. flags in the town of Tell Abyad to deter Turkish harassment shelling or attacks against Syrian Democratic Forces (SDF) there. Notwithstanding, the Turkish military shelled the area on 22 September. Tell Abyad was also a hub for Combined Joint Task Force – Operation Inherent Resolve training of new SDF recruits in the fight against ISIL in Syria. On 27 November 2018, as a part of a deconfliction initiative with Turkish forces in the area, the US set up an observation post in Tal Abyad.

In October 2017, it was reported that Tell Abyad was to be included into the Euphrates Region, consisting of the Kobane Canton and the Tell Abyad Canton. Tell Abyad stayed a part of the canton until the Turkish offensive into north-eastern Syria. The SDF announced the creation of the Military Council of Tell Abyad in June 2019.

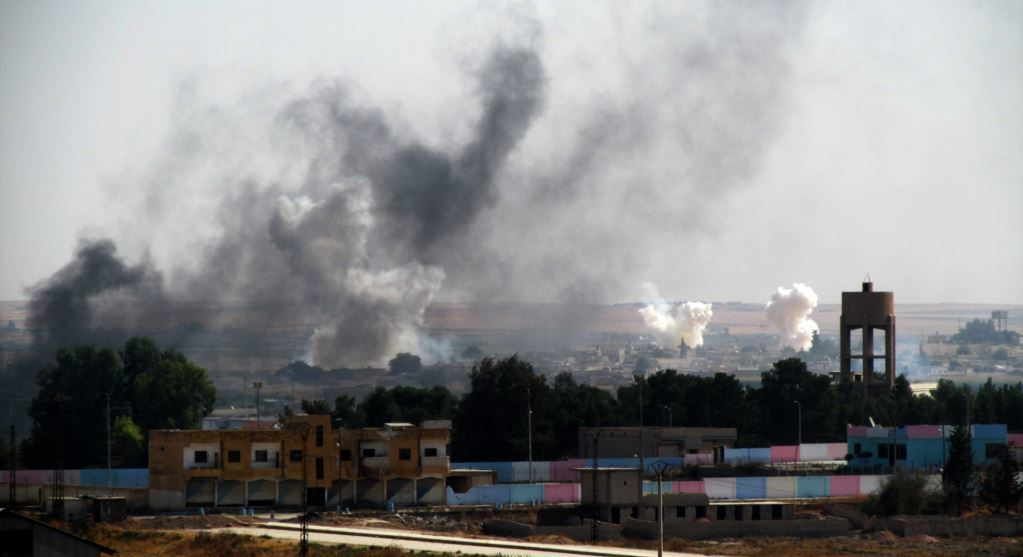
Bombardment of Tell Abyad during the 2019 Turkish offensive.

==== 2019 Turkish/SNA capture of Tell Abyad ====
As part of the Turkish offensive into north-eastern Syria, Turkey launched airstrikes and fired artillery at SDF position inside the town. Social media images posted displayed Syrians fleeing the town. Two civilians were killed and others were wounded as part of the offensive according to The New York Times.

On 13 October 2019, as part of the 2019 Turkish offensive into north-eastern Syria, Turkish Armed Forces and the Syrian National Army captured Tell Abyad, and many villages in the district from the SDF. On October 28, a local council was formed.

Following the capture of Tell Abyad, Turkey imposed direct military control over the town and the Governor of Sanlıurfa has appointed a Turkish led administration to Tell Abyad. The Governorate also stated it would provide a Syrian police trained by the Turkish authorities to the area. The UN High Commissioner on Human Rights Michelle Bachelet, reported that in Tell Abyad the forces supported by Turkey would incur in widespread human rights violations and urged Turkey to initiate an investigation of the matter.

On April 30, 2023, During the diffusion of explosives planted by PKK, two Turkish and one Syrian policemen lost their lives, and 11 policemen, 7 of them Turkish, were injured.

== Demographics ==
Tell Abyad is the administrative center of the Tell Abyad Subdistrict and the Tell Abyad District.

According to multiple sources, the majority of the inhabitants of Tell Abyad and Tell Abyad District are Arabs, with a Kurdish, Turkmen and Armenian minority.

The Germany-based internet portal KurdWatch reports that Tell Abyad is mainly populated by Arabs, and estimates that in the environs of Tell Abyad, 15% of the population is Turkmen, 10% Kurdish, and the rest being Arabs. Other sources claim that Kurds make up 25%-30%. In addition, there are many Turkmen families residing in the city center. The Kurdish minority is concentrated in the west of the town and two small pockets in the countryside immediately to the east and west of town, while a small pocket of Turkman minority exists to the south of the town.

The Arab residents of the town itself belong mainly to the Baggara tribe. Several Arab tribes live in the countryside surrounding the town; Naim (to the east), Annaza (to the southeast), Jays (to the southeast, south and west) and Hannada (immediate south of the town). The Jays tribe is a powerful tribe in the town with strong ties to Turkey and a former political ally of Bashar al Assad.

The Democratic Union Party (PYD) formed a council of elders in Tell Abyad which has the task to administer the region and which is said to be "a fair representation of the ethnic composition of the town" and the Arab majority population. It consisted of 15 people, of which were ten Arabs, three Kurds and respectively one Armenian and one Turkmen.

== Transportation ==
The town was connected with Istanbul and Baghdad through the Baghdad Railway.

== See also ==
- Tell Sabi Abyad
