= Tell Abyad District =

Tell Abyad District منطقة تل أبيض Navçeya Girê Spî
- District
- Location of Tell Abyad District within Raqqa Governorate

- Location in Syria
- Coordinates (Tell Abyad): 36.6975°N 38.9567°E
- Country: Syria
- Governorate: Raqqa
- Seat: Tell Abyad
- Subdistricts: 3 nawāḥī

Area
  - Total: 4,834.02 km^{2} (1,866.43 sq mi)

Population (2004)
  - Total: 129,714
  - Density: 26.8336/km^{2} (69.4986/sq mi)
- Geocode: SY1102

Tell Abyad District (Arabic: منطقة تل أبيض, romanized: Manṭiqat Tall Abyaḍ; Kurdish: Navçeya Girê Spî) is a district of the Raqqa Governorate in northern Syria. The administrative centre is the city of Tell Abyad. Parts of the district were under the Turkish occupation of northern Syria.

Subdistricts of Tell Abyad District

The administrative center of Tell Abyad District and Tell Abyad Subdistrict shown above is the city of Tell Abyad.

The administrative center of Suluk Subdistrict shown above is the city of Suluk.

The administrative center of Ayn Issa Subdistrict shown above is the city of Ayn Issa.

== Demographics ==
At the 2004 census, the district had a population of 129,714. The majority of inhabitants are Arabs, with considerable Kurdish and Turkmen minorities. All three groups are overwhelmingly Sunni. The western part of the district is mainly inhabited by Kurds, the Turkmens are mainly concentrated in Suluk and southwest of the town and the rest of the district is almost all Arab.

== Subdistricts ==
The district of Tell Abyad is divided into three subdistricts or nawāḥī (population as of 2004):

- Tell Abyad Subdistrict (ناحية تل أبيض): population 44,671.
- Suluk Subdistrict (ناحية سلوك): population 44,131
- Ayn Issa Subdistrict (ناحية عين عيسى): population 40,912.

== Archaeology ==
In the valley of the Balikh River, there exists an archaeological site called Tell Sabi Abyad.
