= Raqqa Governorate =

Raqqa Governorate مُحافظة الرقة
- Governorate
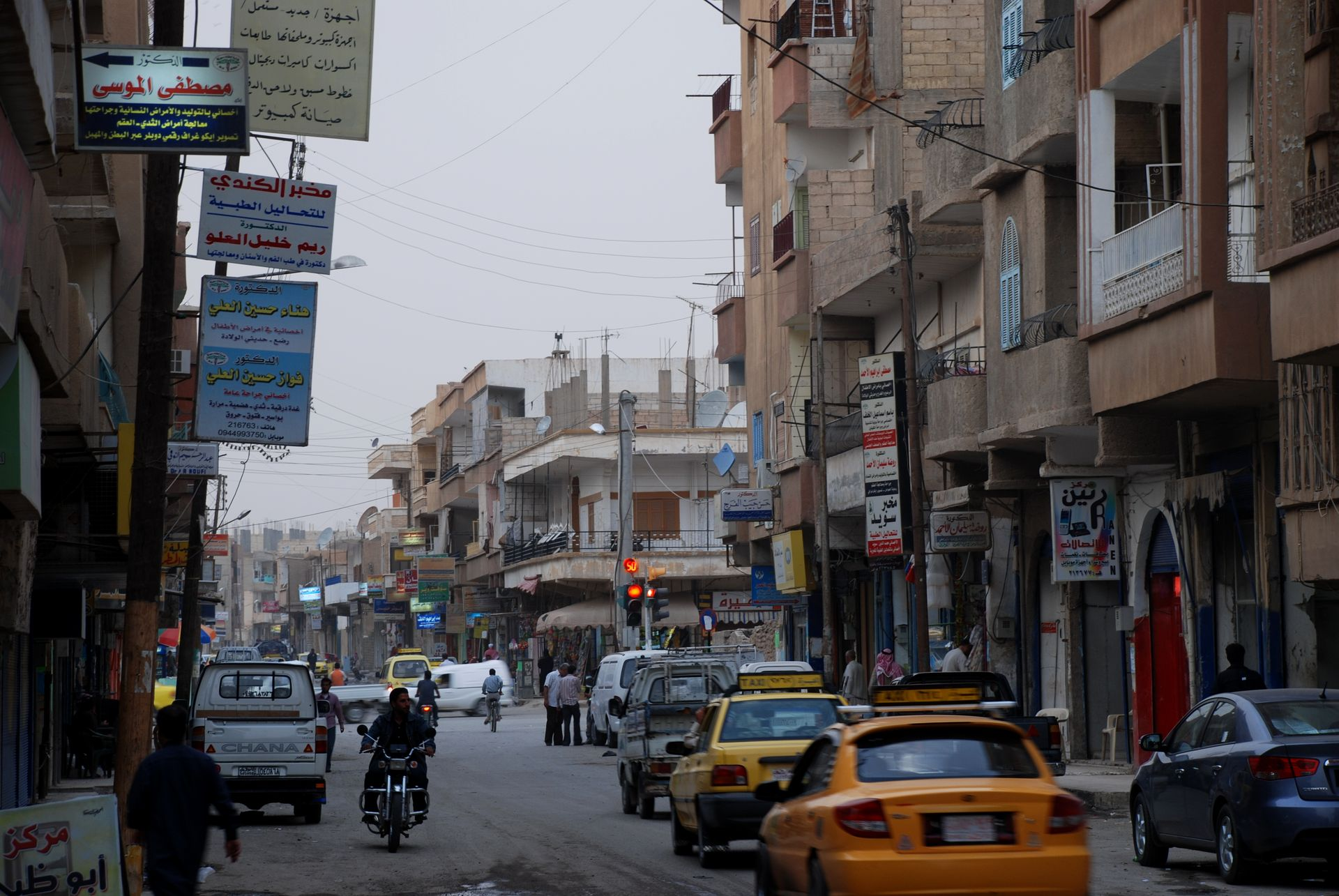
- City center of Raqqa

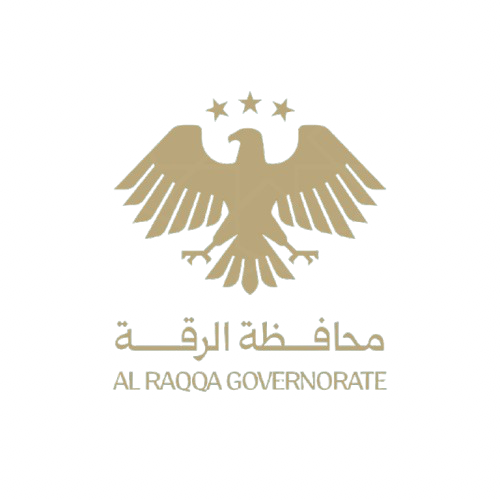
- Seal

- Map of Syria with Raqqa highlighted
- Interactive map of Raqqa Governorate
- Coordinates (Raqqa): 36°N 38.9°E
- Country: Syria
- Capital: Raqqa
- Former seat: 3

Government
  - Governor: Abdul Rahman Salama

Area
  - Total: 19,618 km^{2} (7,575 sq mi)

Population (2011)
  - Total: 944,000
  - Density: 48.1/km^{2} (125/sq mi)
- Time zone: UTC+3 (AST)
- ISO 3166 code: SY-RA

Raqqa Governorate (Arabic: مُحافظة الرقة, romanized: Muḥāfaẓat ar-Raqqah; is one of the fourteen governorates of Syria. It is situated in the north of the country and covers an area of 19,618 km^{2}. The capital is Raqqa.

== History ==
=== Modern Syria (1946–2011) ===
On November 17, 1957, during the presidency of Shukri al-Quwatli, Al-Rashid Governorate, named after Harun al-Rashid, was carved out from the adjacent Deir ez-Zor Governorate. Subsequently, on January 1, 1970, the Governorate's name was changed to Raqqa Governorate.

=== Contemporary Syria ===
ISIS claimed full control of this province as of August 24, 2014 when its fighters captured Tabqa Airbase in the southwest part of the province. However, the Syrian Democratic Forces (SDF) would go on to control much of the province; all of the area north of the Euphrates including the provincial capital of Raqqa and the city of al-Tabqah were under SDF control, with the government holding the southern part of the governorate. After a successful offensive was launched by the Syrian Transitional Government (STG), the SDF would lose control over all of Raqqa, with the Syrian government reestablishing full control over the Governate for the first time since 2012.

=== Syrian civil war (2011–2024) and Syrian conflict ===
As of 19 September 2012, the town of Tell Abyad, directly across the border from the Turkish town of Akçakale, was already under rebel control.

On 11 February 2013, Syrian rebels, including al-Nusra Front fighters, took control of the Tabqa Dam, and Tabqa City, according to SOHR and videos posted by rebels. Tabqa Dam, on the Euphrates river, is the largest hydroelectric dam in Syria and provides electricity to many areas, including Aleppo. Tabqa is also known as Thawrah.

As of September 2014, governance has been fully reestablished with previous personnel who pledge allegiance to the new regime. Only the police and soldiers are ISIS fighters, who receive confiscated lodging previously owned by non-Sunnis and others who fled. ISIS asserts that it is providing welfare services, that it has established price controls, and that it has imposed taxes on the wealthy. The Raqqa Dam continued to provide electricity and water. The exportation of oil brought in tens of millions of dollars.

As of July 2017, the Syrian Democratic Forces control the majority of the province, including the city of Raqqa, which they have captured from ISIS following a months-long siege. A few months before the capture of Raqqa, the Syrian government launched the Southern Raqqa offensive, which cleared southern Raqqa and southeastern Aleppo from ISIS militants. With the south part of the governorate under government control and the northern part under Kurd-led AANES (Rojava), the governorate has been fully cleared from ISIS. On 18 January 2026, the Syrian transitional government captured the majority of the governorate during the 2026 northeastern Syria offensive.

== Geography ==
=== Settlements ===
Raqqa is the provincial capital; other major settlements include Abu Hamad, Abu Susah, Al Hawrah, Al Qaltah, Al-Sabkhah, Al-Tabqah, Ar Ruhayyat, Ar Rusafah, Ath Thadyayn, Bash Dulki, Dulq Maghar, Fatsat ath Thayb, Hamrat Nasir, Jubb al Abyad, Kasrat Muraybit, Ma'adan, Matir, Nasiriyah, Suluk and Tell Abyad.

=== Districts ===
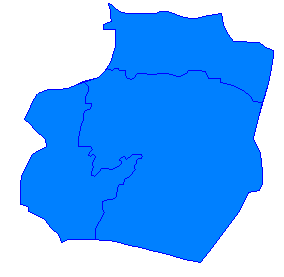

The governorate is divided into three districts (manatiq). The districts are further divided into ten sub-districts (nawahi):

- Raqqa District (4 sub-districts)
  - Raqqa Subdistrict
  - Al-Sabkhah Subdistrict
  - Al-Karamah Subdistrict
  - Maadan Subdistrict
- Tell Abyad District (3 sub-districts)
  - Tell Abyad Subdistrict
  - Suluk Subdistrict
  - Ayn Issa Subdistrict
- Tabqa District (3 sub-districts)
  - Tabqa Subdistrict
  - Al-Mansurah Subdistrict
  - Al-Jarniyah Subdistrict

== Demographics ==
Historical population
| Year | Pop. | ±% |
|---|---|---|
| 2004 | 793,500 | — |
| 2011 | 944,000 | +19.0% |
| 2018 | 919,000 | −2.6% |

As per the 2004 Syrian census the population was 793,500. A 2011 UNOCHA estimate put the population at 944,000, though this has likely changed since the start of the war.
