= Raqqa campaign (2016–2017) =

Part of the Rojava–Islamist conflict in Syria

- Part of the Rojava–Islamist conflict, the United States intervention in Syria, and the Syrian civil war
- Top: A map of the SDF advances in the Raqqa Governorate; Bottom: A map of the SDF advances inside of Raqqa city itself
Date	6 November 2016 – 20 October 2017 (11 months and 2 weeks)
Location	Raqqa Governorate and northern Deir ez-Zor Governorate, Syria 35.9500°N 39.0100°E
Result	Decisive SDF / CJTF-OIR victory: The SDF captures more than 236 villages, hamlets and strategic hills, two water and power stations, Tabqa Airbase, Tabqa city, Tabqa Dam, and Mansoura Dam; The SDF comes within 5 km of the Islamic State's capital city of Raqqa, in early February 2017; The SDF enters Raqqa city on 6 June 2017, and completely captures it on 17 October 2017
Territorial changes	The SDF captures more than 7,400 square kilometres (2,900 sq mi) of territory from ISIL during the first, second and third phases of the campaign

Belligerents
DFNS; Syrian Democratic Forces; Women's Protection Units; People's Defense Units; YPG International'; International Freedom Battalion (Note: Most leftist foreign volunteers fight as part of the YPG, though some have also formed an independent unit, the Antifascist International Tabur, or joined the International Freedom Battalion. The latter is a larger unit, mostly composed of Kurdish and Turkish communists.); Self Defence Forces (HXP); Sinjar Resistance Units; Êzîdxan Women's Units; CJTF–OIR; United States; France; United Kingdom; Germany; Iraqi Kurdistan Co-belligerents (Syria) Syrian Arab Republic; Russia	Islamic State

Commanders and leaders
Sipan Hamo (YPG chief commander); Rojda Felat (Leading YPJ commander); Kino Gabriel (MFS commander) (Syrian opposition) Fayad Ghanim (Raqqa Hawks Brigade commander); Abu Issa (Jabhat Thuwar al-Raqqa chief commander) (Syrian opposition) Muhedi Jayila (Elite Forces commander); Bandar al-Humaydi (Al-Sanadid Forces military chief commander); Siyamend Welat (HXP chief commander) (United States) Lt. Gen. Stephen J. Townsend (CJTF–OIR chief commander); For other anti-ISIL commanders, see order of battle	(Islamic State) Abu Bakr al-Baghdadi (WIA) (Leader of ISIL); Abu Jandal al-Kuwaiti † (Leading ISIL commander for Raqqa defenses, c. 11–26 December); Abu Saraqeb al-Maghribi (Head of security in Al-Thawrah); Abu Jandal al-Masri (Chief of Information in Raqqa); Abu Muhammad al-Jazrawi (Chief of Al-Hisba secret police Mahmoud al-Isawi † (ISIL propaganda chief); Abd al-Basit al-Iraqi † (ISIL commander of Middle East external networks); Zainuri Kamaruddin † (Katibah Nusantara commander); Abu Luqman (ISIL governor of Raqqa); For other ISIL commanders, see order of battle

Units involved
See anti-ISIL forces order of battle	See ISIL order of battle

Strength
30,000–40,000 SDF fighters (70% Arab acc. to the SDF): 25,000 YPG & YPJ fighters; 1,000 female Arab volunteers; (Syrian opposition) 1,000 Raqqa Hawks fighters; (Syrian opposition) 650–3,500 Elite Forces fighters; 2,000 Al-Sanadid fighters; 500 Deir Ezzor Military Council fighters; 200 Syriac Military Council fighters; 2,550 Manbij Military Council fighters; 3,870 local pro-SDF tribes and village militia (Note: 1,500 volunteers from villages captured by the SDF during phase one; 1,000 volunteers from villages captured during phase two, 750 volunteers from villages captured during phase three, 200 more joined in April); 500 HXP soldiers (United States) 503 USSOCOM Soldiers; 11th Marine Expeditionary Unit (France) Several Dozens of Special Forces and military advisers (Russia) Several Tupolev Tu-95 bombers	10,000–20,000+ fighters (estimate by Western SDF volunteers & some experts): Raqqa city: c. 5,000 fighters; Large number of reinforcements from Mosul and al-Bab; 200 Iraqi reinforcements; Unknown number of child soldiers; Unknown number of UAVs (drones)

Casualties and losses
1,100–1,200+ killed, 2,500+ wounded (per US); 793 killed, 1,685 wounded (per SDF) (United States) 1 killed (France) 1 killed	3,784+ killed and 38 captured (SDF claim; up to 31 Aug. 2017, excluding July 2017) (Note: First Phase: 185 killed;"Syrian Democratic Forces launch second phase of Raqqa Operation - ARA News". Archived from the original on 2016-12-13. Second Phase: 536 killed, 12 captured;"Over 530 ISIS jihadists killed, 133 villages liberated in the second phase of the Raqqa campaign - ARA News". Archived from the original on 2017-01-17. Third Phase: 377 killed, 8 captured;"YPG made January and February outcomes clear | ANHA". Archived from the original on 2017-03-05. Fourth Phase: 500+ killed, 8 captured;"At least 311 ISIS jihadists killed by SDF fire in military campaign to liberate Raqqa's northern countryside - ARA News". Archived from the original on 2017-07-01. Fifth Phase: 1,786 killed, 10 captured; Total of 3,784+ reported killed and 38 captured); 6,000 killed (US claim)
- 2,385 civilians killed 200,000 civilians displaced

The Raqqa campaign (codenamed Operation Wrath of Euphrates) was a military operation launched in November 2016 during the Rojava–Islamist conflict by the Syrian Democratic Forces (SDF) against the Islamic State (IS) in the Raqqa Governorate, with the goal of isolating and eventually capturing the Islamic State's capital city, Raqqa. The SDF's subsidiary goals included capturing the Tabqa Dam, the nearby city of al-Thawrah, and the Mansoura Dam further downstream. The campaign ended successfully in October 2017, with the capture of the city of Raqqa.

The offensive was concurrent with the Battle of Sirte in Libya, the Battle of Mosul in Iraq, the Battle of al-Bab in the Aleppo Governorate, the Palmyra offensive, the reignition of fighting in Deir ez-Zor's siege, the Central Syria campaign, and the Mayadin offensive.

== Background ==
In late October 2016, the United States Secretary of Defense Ash Carter called for an offensive on Raqqa to take place concurrent with the Battle of Mosul in Iraq. He stated that the US was cooperating with its allies in order to launch an "isolation operation" around Raqqa. On 26 October, the President of Turkey Recep Tayyip Erdoğan called the President of the United States Barack Obama and stated that he did not want the People's Protection Units (YPG) to participate in the planned operation, and instead, planned to involve the Turkish Armed Forces. The United Kingdom's Secretary of State for Defence Michael Fallon rejected the idea of non-Arab forces taking part in the offensive and demanded a purely Arab force.

On the same day, the commander of the Combined Joint Task Force – Operation Inherent Resolve Lt. Gen. Stephen J. Townsend stressed that the YPG-led Syrian Democratic Forces was the only armed group capable of capturing Raqqa in the near future. Fewer US-led coalition troops were to be involved than in the Battle of Mosul. On 3 November, the commander of the Seljuk Brigade and SDF spokesman Col. Talal Silo rejected the participation of Turkey in the operation.

After the start of the Battle of Mosul, many of the 20,000 ISIL fighters estimated to be living in Mosul fled to Raqqa, boosting the ISIL forces that were already present in their de facto capital city.

== Announcement ==
The SDF officially announced the start of the operation on 6 November 2016, in the city of Ayn Issa. The intention was to proceed in two phases, first seizing areas around Raqqa and isolating the city, advancing from three fronts, then taking control of the city itself. The SDF general command called for the international coalition against ISIL to support the operation. Secretary of Defense Ash Carter welcomed the announcement.

== The offensive ==
=== Phase One: Isolating Raqqa from its northern hinterland ===
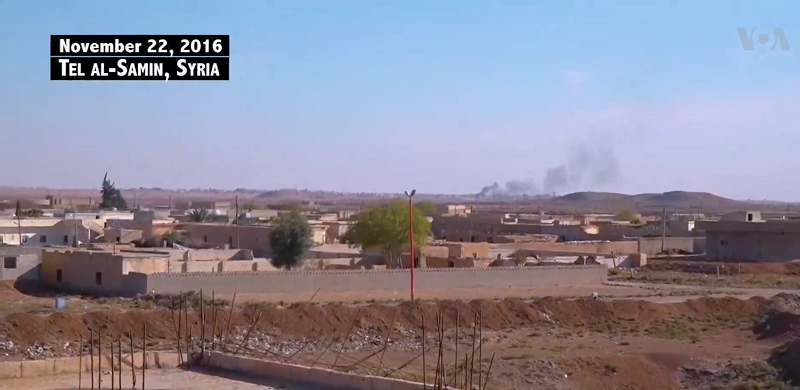
Tal Saman, former ISIL headquarters in the northern Raqqa countryside, after being captured by the SDF

On 6 November, the SDF captured six small villages, Wahid, Umm Safa, Wasita, Haran, al-Adriyah and Jurah, south and southeast of Ayn Issa. The Islamic State detonated four car bombs on the first day of the offensive.

On 8 November, the SDF reported that they had taken control of 11 villages near Ayn Issa, and that the Islamic State forces used several car bombs against them. By 11 November, the SDF had captured over a dozen villages and the strategically significant town of Al-Hisbah, which had served as a local headquarters and command center for ISIL. On the next day, the SDF continued to advance against ISIL in the area around Tal Saman and Khnez, bringing the number of captured farms and villages to 26.

On 14 November, the SDF stated that 500 km^{2} has been captured, including 34 villages, 31 hamlets and seven strategic hills, and 167 Islamic State casualties had been inflicted. The SDF had also begun to besiege Tal Saman, the largest village and ISIL headquarters north of Raqqa, while ISIL launched a counter-attack near Salok in the eastern countryside of Raqqa Governorate in an attempt to force the SDF to split its forces and open a new front. On the next day, the SDF advanced into Tal Saman, resulting in a fierce battle with its ISIL defenders, and captured 10 more villages and farms. By 19 November, the SDF had fully captured Tal Saman and had driven ISIL completely from the surrounding countryside. With this, the first phase of the offensive was considered complete.

=== Stalemate and preparation for the second phase ===
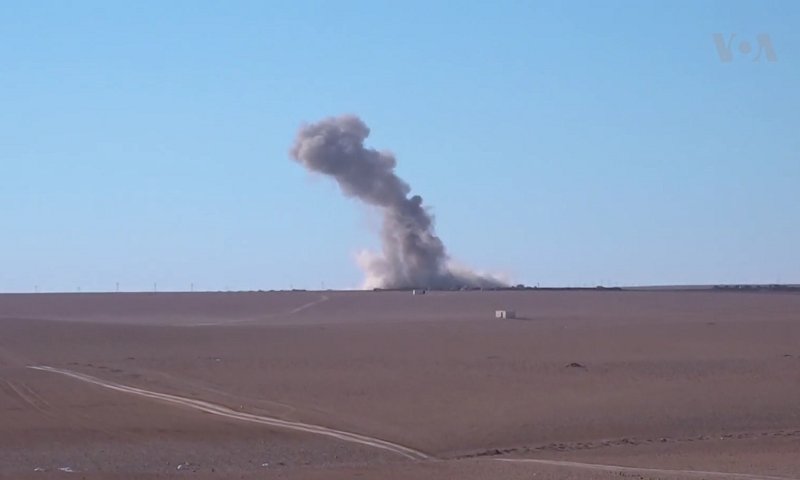
A United States Air Force airstrike on an ISIL position to the north of Raqqa

The second phase of the offensive aimed to enforce a full blockade of the city of Raqqa. On 21 November, the SDF captured two more villages, while ISIL launched a counter-attack near Tal Saman. Over the next days, the SDF attempted to further advance, such as at al-Qalita, but was unable to break through ISIL's defense line south of Tal Saman. On 24 November, a US serviceman died from wounds he suffered after stepping on an improvised explosive device near the town of Ayn Issa, to the north of Raqqa.

On 25 November, ISIL received reinforcements from Iraq, among them explosive experts and defected Iraqi Army personnel. On the next day, ISIL launched a counter-attack, retaking parts of Qaltah village and a nearby water pump station, while the SDF managed to advance in the village's vicinity. Boubaker Al-Hakim, an ISIL commander who was linked to the Charlie Hebdo shooting, was reported to have been killed in an American airstrike in Raqqa on 26 November. Iraqi military however later stated in April 2017 that he might still be alive.

On 27 November, the SDF announced the offensive's second phase was due to start, though this was then delayed. At least five SDF fighters were killed in renewed clashes north of Raqqa on 29 November. Meanwhile, ISIL suffered from the defection of two senior commanders, who fled from Raqqa to join Jabhat Fateh al-Sham in Idlib. On 4 December, a coalition drone strike in Raqqa killed two ISIL leaders who had helped facilitate the November 2015 Paris attacks and another who was involved in a foiled suicide attack in Belgium in 2015. Three days later, co-Chair of the Democratic Union Party (PYD) Salih Muslim said that the first phase to surround Raqqa was almost over, while a new Arab brigade consisting of more than 1,000 men and women from the Raqqa area had joined the SDF as part of the second phase which was slated to be launched on 10 December. More than 1,500 Arab fighters who were trained and equipped by the anti-ISIL coalition joined the SDF for the second phase on its launch day.

=== Phase Two: Isolating Raqqa from its western countryside ===
==== Initial advances ====
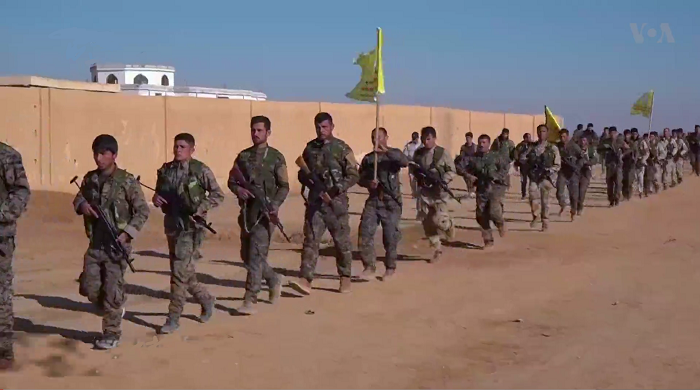
SDF fighters northwest of Raqqa after the start of the offensive's second phase.

The SDF launched the second phase on 10 December, with the aim of capturing the northwestern and western countryside of Raqqa and ultimately reaching and securing the Tabqa Dam. The same day, it was announced that Arab SDF groups, consisting of the Elite Forces, Jabhat Thuwar al-Raqqa and the newly formed Deir Ezzor Military Council would be taking part. During the first day, the SDF began to advance south of the Tishrin Dam and captured al-Kiradi village. The United States announced that it would send 200 more troops to assist the SDF. The next day, the SDF captured seven more villages from ISIL. On 12 December, the SDF captured four villages as well as many hamlets south of Tishrin Dam. The SDF captured five villages during the next two days. On 15 December, the SDF captured three villages, taking the total number of villages captured by them in the second phase to 20.

Over the next four days, the SDF captured 20 more villages and finally reaching Lake Assad, thereby cutting off and besieging 54 ISIL-held villages to the west. In response to these territorial losses, ISIL began to carry out more suicide attacks against both the SDF as well as civilian targets within SDF-controlled areas in an attempt to hinder the offensive. On 19 December, ISIL launched a counter-attack to regain four villages in the northwestern countryside, but the attack was repelled after a few hours. The SDF declared that they had captured 97 villages overall during the second phase, and had begun to advance against Qal'at Ja'bar.

==== Battle of Jabar ====
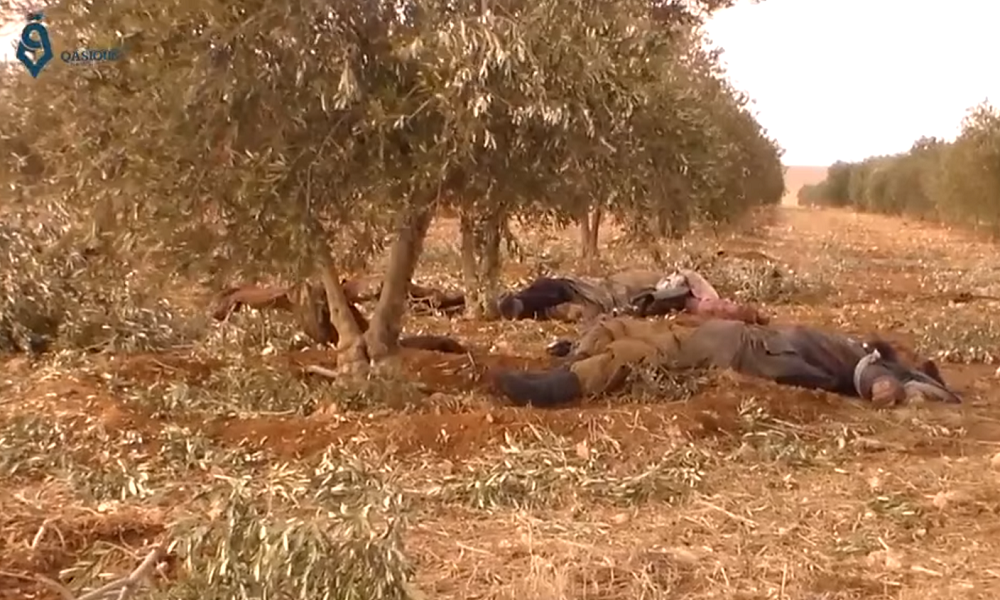
Dead ISIL fighters near Mahmudli

On 21 December, the SDF seized Jabar, which served as the main weaponry storage and supply centre for ISIL in the northwestern countryside. The coalition then began to move toward Suwaydiya Saghirah and Suwaydiya Kabir, the last villages before Tabqa Dam. Dozens of ISIS fighters launched counter-attack on Jabar village, confirmed killing 5 SDF fighters, among them a British volunteer, Ryan Lock. Jabar village soon recaptured after, the SDF attacked again on 23 December, and once again took control of it, while also capturing another village. This prompted ISIL to launch yet another counter-attack later that day, which was accompanied by several suicide car bombs. As a result, heavy clashes took place between them and SDF fighters in several villages along the frontline that lasted until the early morning of 24 December. The ISIL forces were eventually forced to withdraw after the SDF first shelled and then stormed their positions, whereupon the latter took control of most of Jabar as well as two more villages, though some ISIL holdouts persisted in Jabar.

ISIL was pushed out of the neighboring, strategic village of Eastern Jabar on the next day, bringing the SDF within 5 kilometres (3.1 mi) of Tabqa Dam, and by 26 December, the SDF had finally fully secured the main Jabar village, with the last ISIL defenders being expelled after heavy fighting. An ISIL counterattack on the village later that day failed, with a US airstrike killing Abu Jandal al-Kuwaiti as he commanded the assault. Al-Kuwaiti, also known as Abdulmuhsin al-Zaghelan al-Tarish, was a high-ranking ISIL commander leading the defense of the whole Raqqa region against the SDF. Meanwhile, the Amaq News Agency declared that Iman Na'im Tandil (nom de guerre: Abu 'Umar Al-Hindi), one of the few Indian ISIL fighters active in Syria, had also been killed during the fighting near Jabar. The Islamic State's official media wing later also officially paid tribute to Iman.

==== Battle for Jabar's surroundings ====
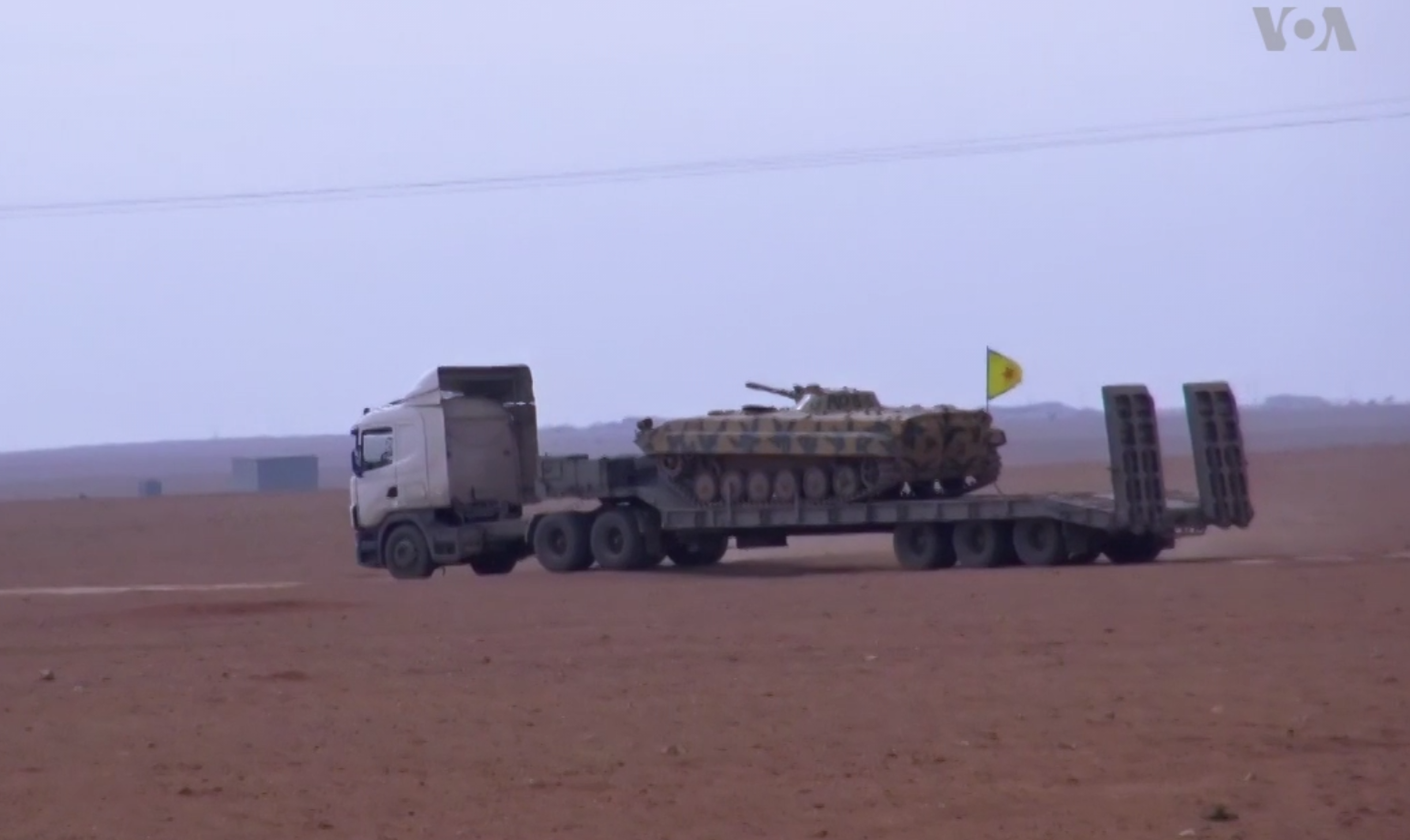
A YPG BMP, loaded on a truck, being transported to the frontline near Mahmudli on 4 January

===== First week =====
On 27 December, ISIL launched an attack on the village of Secol in the northern countryside, reportedly breaching the local SDF defences. On the next day, the SDF reportedly captured Hadaj village after two days of heavy fighting, while another ISIL counter-attack against Jabar was repelled. Mahmud al-Isawi, a senior ISIL manager of finances for the group's leaders who also worked in propaganda and intelligence-gathering, was killed on 31 December in a US-led coalition airstrike on Raqqa. After three days of heavy fighting, the SDF captured all or most of Mahmudli, the largest town of the Al-Jarniyah Subdistrict, on 1 January 2017. ISIL counterattacked later in an attempt to regain the town. The SDF leadership said that in the clashes since the launch of the second phase they had captured 110 villages, killed 277 ISIL fighters, and captured 13.

Also, on January 1, 2017, the SDF resumed its offensive on the northern front, advancing 6 km south of Tell Saman against ISIL positions. The SDF captured nine more villages in this area within the next three days. Meanwhile, with the SDF edging closer to Raqqa, ISIL further restricted Internet access and increased surveillance over Internet users in Raqqa. There were harsh punishments for accessing anti-ISIL websites, with a new special unit within the ISIL's security office searching for offenders. Several online activists in Raqqa were captured and tortured or executed.

===== Second week =====
Another two villages and hamlets were captured by the SDF on 5 January 2017.

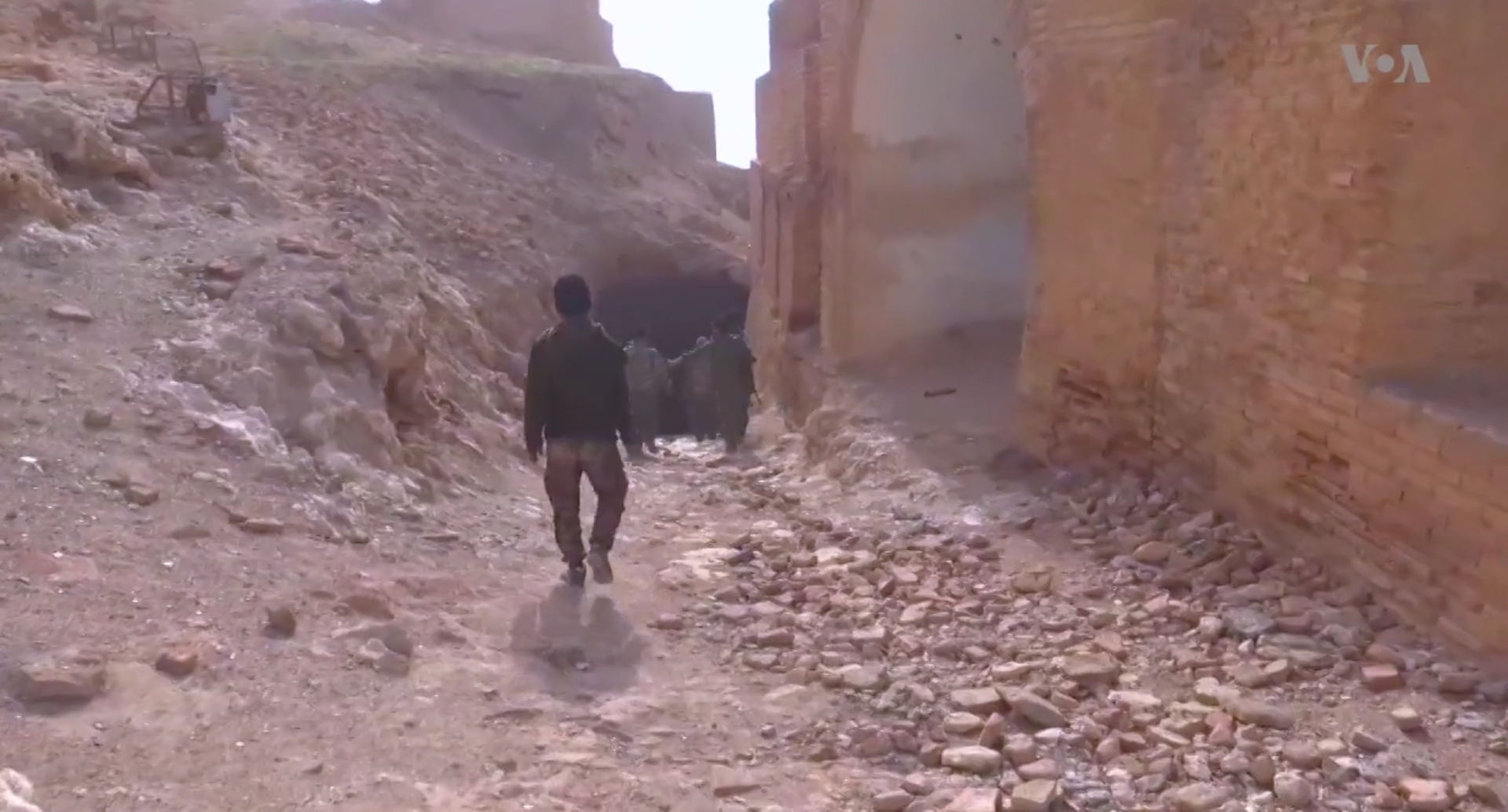
SDF fighters examine Qal'at Ja'bar. ISIL militants had built tunnels and weapons depots into the medieval castle.

The SDF captured Qal'at Ja'bar (Ja'bar Castle) from ISIL on 6 January. The same day, ISIL was reported to have moved its 150 prisoners from Tabqa city due to the offensive. The SDF later captured eight villages and five hamlets at the Ayn Issa front. On 7 January, the SDF captured five villages including the strategic Suwaydiya Gharbi and Suwaydiya Saghirah, reaching the outskirts of Tabqa Dam. ISIL recaptured Suwaydiya Saghirah by the next day after a counterattack, while a local leader of the group was killed in clashes. Meanwhile, ISIL was reported to have withdrawn 150 of its fighters towards Raqqa city.

On 8 January 2017, US special forces raided the village of Al-Kubar, between Raqqa and Deir ez-Zor, killing at least 25 ISIL militants in the two-hour operation. It was believed that the goal of the US may have been to rescue hostages from an ISIL secret prison in the village. After the raid, ISIL forces cut off access to the village.

On 9 January, the SDF captured another village, along with three hamlets.

===== Third week =====
On 10 January, ISIL launched a large-scale counter-attack at the Jabar frontline and reportedly recaptured several sites; with pro-Free Syrian Army sources claiming Qal'at Ja'bar and the village of Jabar were among these. ISIL consequently released photos of dead SDF fighters, while claiming that over 70 of them had been killed in the counter-attack. However, the SDF was reported to still be in control of Jabar village and Qalat Jabar a few days later.

An ISIL attack on Jib Shair village, trying to resist SDF advances from the north, was repelled on the next day, after which the SDF advanced and captured six hamlets around it. The SDF later announced that their forces advancing from the Ayn Issa front and on the Qadiriya front linked up in Kurmanju village after capturing several villages over the past few days, besieging a large pocket of about 45 villages and 20 hamlets. All of them were captured by the next day, resulting in the alliance gaining about 460 square kilometres (180 sq mi) of land. Another village was captured by the SDF on 13 January. On 15 January, the SDF progressed to Suwaydiya Kabir village, while ISIL launched a large-scale counter-attack against Mahmudli and a nearby village, resulting in clashes within these settlements. The attack was repelled after several hours of fighting. The SDF captured three villages during the day, while Suwaydiya Saghirah was also reported to be under its control again.

===== Fourth week =====
On 17 January 2017, 28 Arab tribes from Raqqa announced their support for the offensive and encouraged locals to join the SDF.

The SDF attacked Suwaydiya Kabir on the next day, leading to heavy clashes in the village. Meanwhile, it was announced that about 2,500 local fighters had joined the offensive since it began. On 19 January, ISIL launched a counter-attack against Suwaydiya Saghirah, supported by mortars and heavy machine guns, killing or wounding several YPG fighters. Despite this, the SDF made further progress on the next day, capturing a village and advancing against many other ISIL-held villages. The SDF again attacked Suwaydiya Kabir on 20 January, reaching the outskirts of the village, and captured it on 22 January after heavy clashes, with the support of U.S. special forces.

==== Tabqa Dam raid and further SDF advances in the north ====
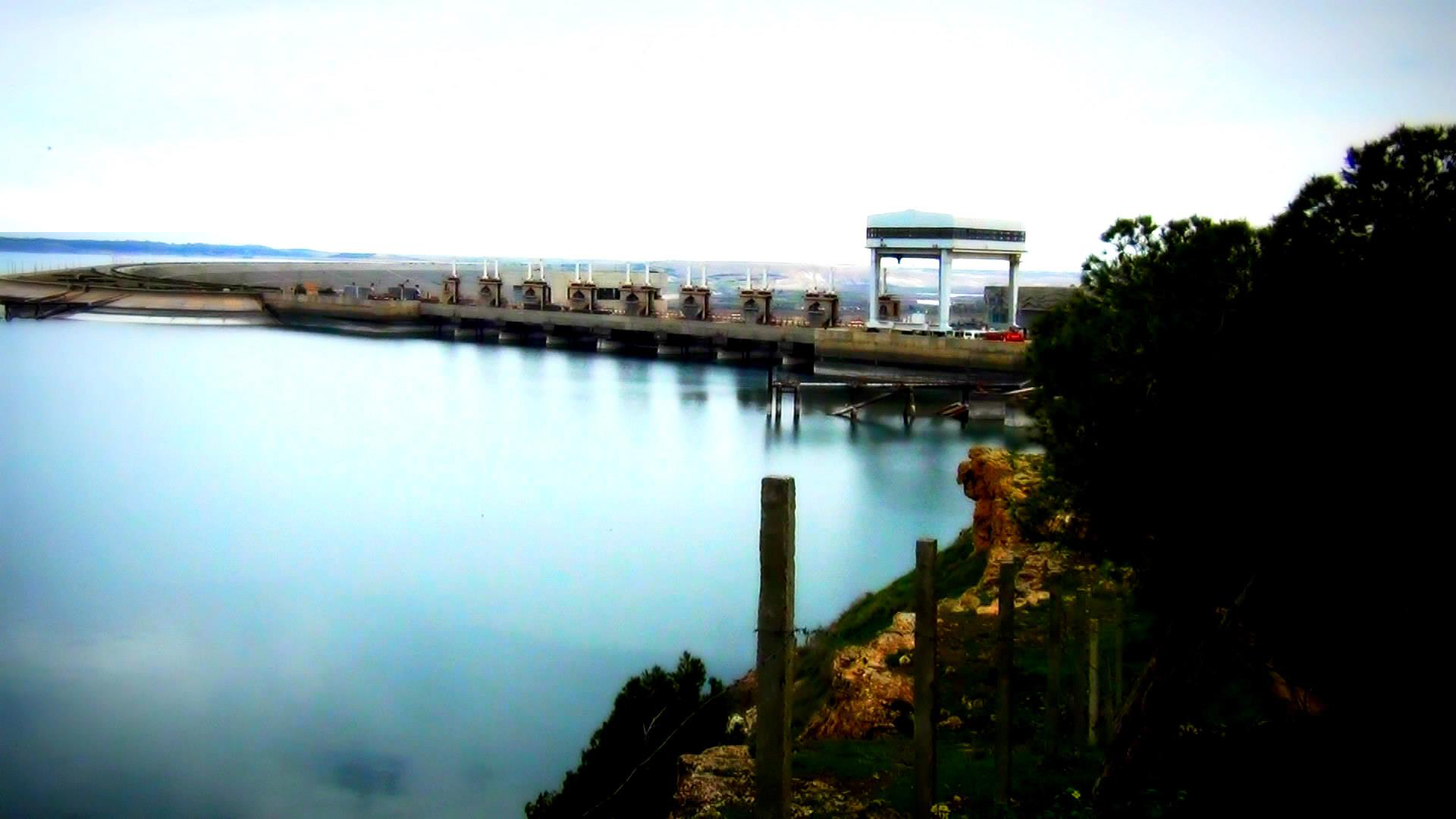
The Tabqa Dam in 2014

In late January 2017, it was reported that a number of ISIL militants were hiding inside the structure of the Tabqa Dam, including senior militant leaders who used to be "very important prisoners" wanted by the US and several other countries, in order to deter a possible US-led coalition strike on them.

On 23 January, the SDF began to advance on the Tabqa Dam, spurring ISIL to open its turbines to raise the Euphrates River's water levels. This was seen as an attempt to hinder the progress of the Kurdish-led forces and a scare tactic, and caused the water level of the Euphrates to rise to its highest level in 20 years, leading to record flooding downstream. By 24 January, the SDF managed to capture parts of the town, and they began to work towards the Tabqa Dam's control rooms, at the southern part of the dam, in an attempt to stop the massive outflow of water released by ISIL. However, the entrance to the dam's control rooms was too well defended, and with the continued threat of disastrous flooding downstream, SDF and the US forces withdrew from both the Tabqa Dam and the town of Al-Thawrah, after which ISIL closed the dam's turbines again.

Over the next three days, ISIL repeatedly launched fierce counter-attacks against SDF positions in the western and northern countryside. ISIL managed to retake ground in the area around the dam, but the attack was later repelled.

=== Preparation for the third phase ===
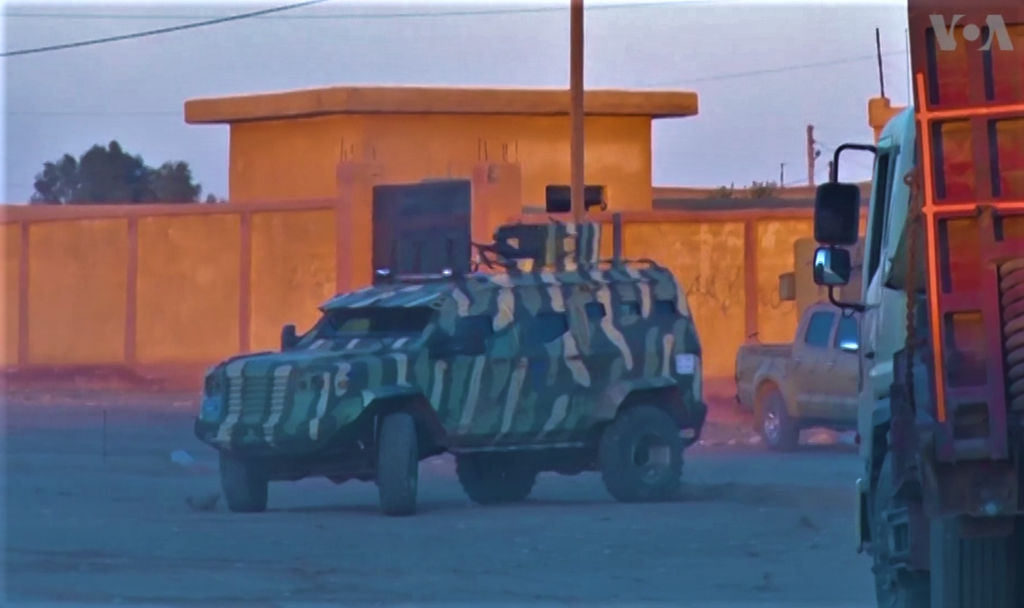
An SDF IAG Guardian armoured personnel carrier in February 2017, one of several APCs that were supplied by the United States to the SDF

On 31 January 2017, the SDF received a number of armoured personnel carriers supplied by the US. The SDF spokesman stated that preparations for a new phase of the operation were continuing and the operation would begin in "a few days". Meanwhile, the leader of the SDF-aligned Syria's Tomorrow Movement and its paramilitary wing, Ahmad Jarba, announced that 3,000 Arab fighters under his command were training with US special forces to be deployed in the battle for Raqqa against ISIL.

On the night of 2–3 February, intense CJTF–OIR airstrikes targeted several bridges in or near Raqqa city, destroying them as well as the local water pipelines, leaving the city without drinking water. Meanwhile, the SDF advanced against the village of Qaltah in the northern countryside, which the coalition had already unsuccessfully attacked in November. ISIL maintenance crews managed to fix the pipelines during 3 February, restoring Raqqa's water supply. On 3 February, 251 Arab fighters in Hasaka completed their training and joined the SDF.

=== Phase Three: Isolating Raqqa from its eastern countryside ===
==== Pressing south ====
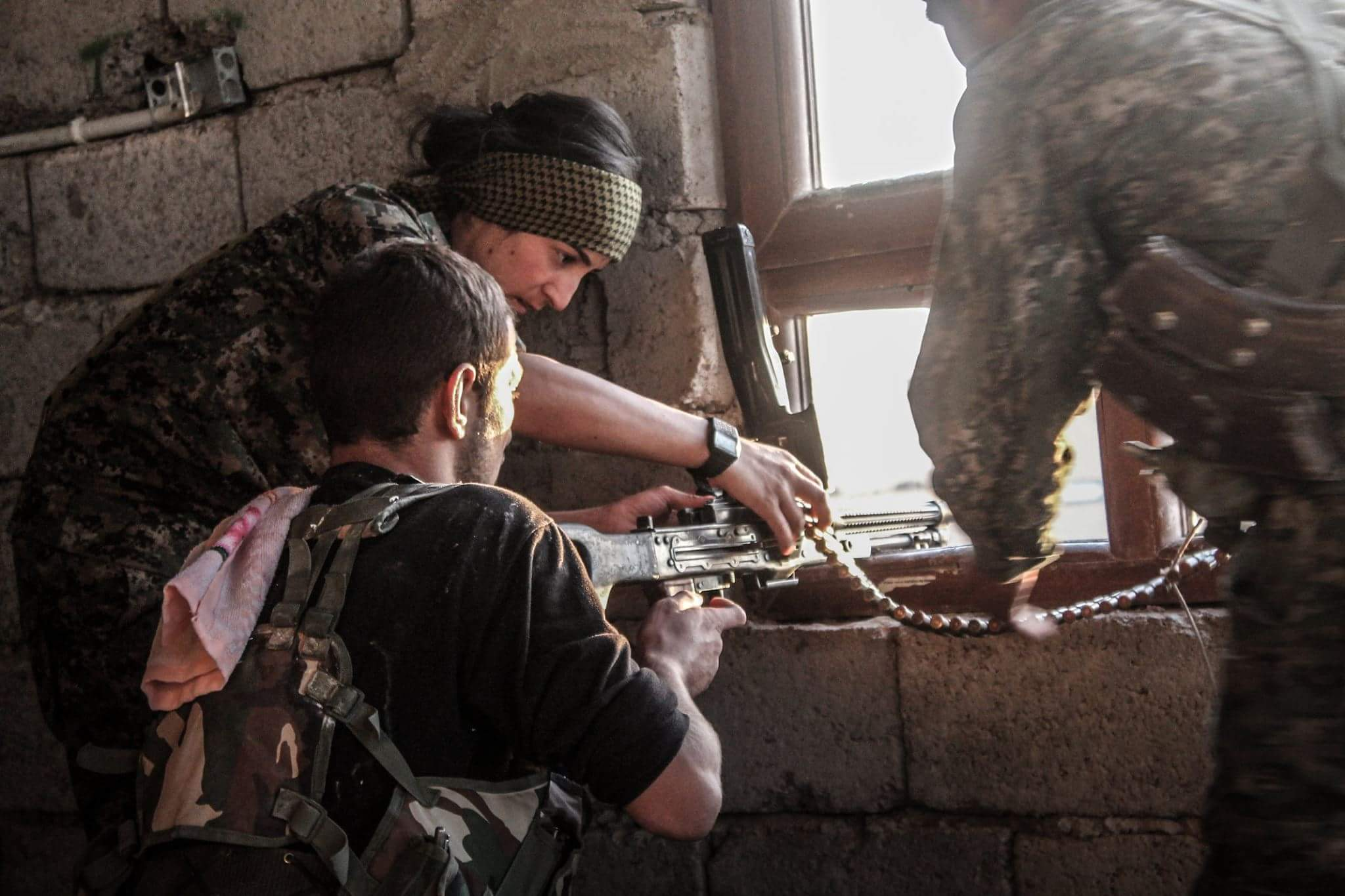
YPG and YPJ fighters in combat

On 4 February, the SDF announced the offensive's third phase, aiming at capturing Raqqa's eastern countryside, and to separate Raqqa city from ISIL forces in Deir ez-Zor, though operations in the west and north would continue simultaneously. The SDF captured a village and three hamlets to the northeast of Raqqa later that day, with clashes being reported at al-Qaltah and Bir Said. On the next day, the Kurdish-led forces captured another two villages along with a hamlet and two farms, and besieged Bir Said, while especially intense airstrikes hit several ISIL targets in Al-Thawrah. Bir Said, along with another village, was eventually captured by the SDF on 6 February. In addition to these villages, the SDF also captured another five villages on two fronts. The SDF made further progress, capturing three more villages on 7 February. In early February 2017, US-led coalition airstrikes destroyed much of the Deir ez-Zor-Raqqa highway, reducing it to a single-file gravel road in some spots, with the SDF patrolling other areas with minefields, in order to prevent ISIL from reinforcing Raqqa city. By this point, almost all of the five bridges leading to Raqqa had been destroyed either by the US-led coalition or by ISIL, with the only exceptions being the Tabqa Dam and the Mansoura Dam, both west of Raqqa city.

As these advances continued, ISIL responded by launching several unsuccessful counter-attacks against Suwaydiya Kabir and other strategic territories captured by the SDF. On 8 and 9 February, the SDF advanced at the northern and northeastern frontline, capturing several villages and besieging Mizella, a major strategic ISIL stronghold in the northern countryside. The advance put them within 11 kilometres (6.8 mi) of Raqqa. The SDF captured Mizella the next day. The two fronts of the alliance converged on 11 February as it also captured two villages and wheat silos to the north of Raqqa during the day; the next day, the SDF attempted to cross the Balikh River northeast of Raqqa, leading to heavy fighting with local ISIL defenders. On 12 February, a large-scale counter-attack by ISIL reportedly succeeded in retaking Suwaydiya Kabir and four other nearby villages. Another counterattack was carried out by ISIL to the northeast of Raqqa where the SDF had advanced to, leading to heavy clashes between both sides. Clashes continued over the next few days.

==== Capturing the eastern countryside ====
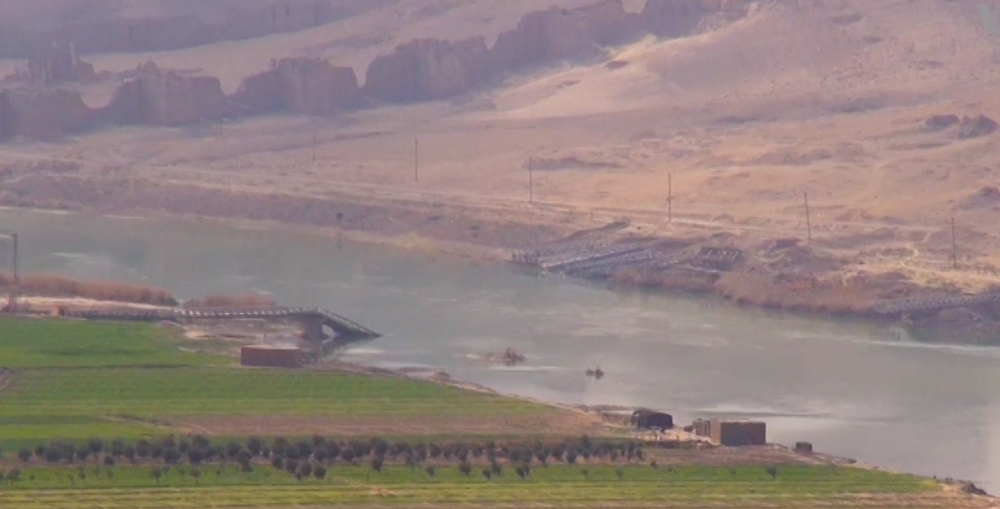
A destroyed bridge over the Euphrates in Deir ez-Zor Governorate. As a result of the CJTF–OIR bombing campaign, as well as ISIL detonations, most bridges across the river were destroyed.

On 17 February 2017, the SDF announced the launch of the second stage of the third phase, aimed at capturing the eastern countryside of Raqqa near Deir ez-Zor, with the Deir Ezzor Military Council leading the operation. On the same day the SDF captured two villages from ISIL to the north of Deir ez-Zor and came within 6 kilometres (3.7 mi) of the northeast of Raqqa, while the Russian Air Force conducted airstrikes on ISIL forces in Raqqa city for the second time since its entry into the war. The next day, the SDF captured another village to the southwest of the Makman front (north of Deir ez-Zor) as well as another near Raqqa. On 18 February, the SDF stormed a prison a few kilometres northeast of Raqqa, freeing some of the inmates. They later captured three villages in Deir ez-Zor's northern countryside. On 20 February, they captured four villages on the Makmen front, including the strategic village of Sebah al-Xêr as well as a base station of Syriatel, thus cutting off the road between Makman and Raqqa and besieging three ISIL-held villages. Furthermore, the SDF took control of a significant bridge over the Balikh River on the western front.

On 21 February, the SDF captured two villages on the Makman front and another one near Raqqa. ISIL later again assaulted Suwaydiya Kabir, attacking it from three fronts, leading to heavy fighting around it. The SDF continued advancing in the eastern countryside of Raqqa on 22 February, capturing three villages, and merging the two fronts at Makman and Bir Hebe. A YPJ commander declared that the SDF had cut the road to Raqqa and Deir ez-Zor. The SDF stated that it had entered Deir ez-Zor Governorate for the first time in the offensive. On the next day, they captured six villages and sixteen hamlets.

==== Opening of a new front ====
On 24 February, the SDF captured four villages in the Makman front and another three in a fourth front to the northeast of Deir ez-Zor. They captured the strategic Abu Khashab village later that day. On 25 February, they captured another three villages on the fourth front.

On 26 February, a US airstrike near Tabqa Dam destroyed a former government facility which was being used as a headquarters by ISIL. The airstrike's proximity to the dam's structure led to fears that the dam could potentially be destabilized or destroyed during the fighting. Later that day, it was reported that the SDF had captured the village of Al-Kubar, on the northern bank of the Euphrates in the Deir ez-Zor countryside, further tightening the siege on Raqqa. On 28 February, it was reported that the US-led coalition had completely destroyed the Tabqa Airbase in an airstrike.

On 27 February, the plan that the Pentagon submitted to US President Donald Trump to significantly speed up the fight against ISIL included a significant increase in US participation in the Raqqa campaign, with the possibility of the US increasing its ground presence on the Raqqa front to 4,000–5,000 troops.

==== Advance to the Raqqa-Deir Ezzor highway ====
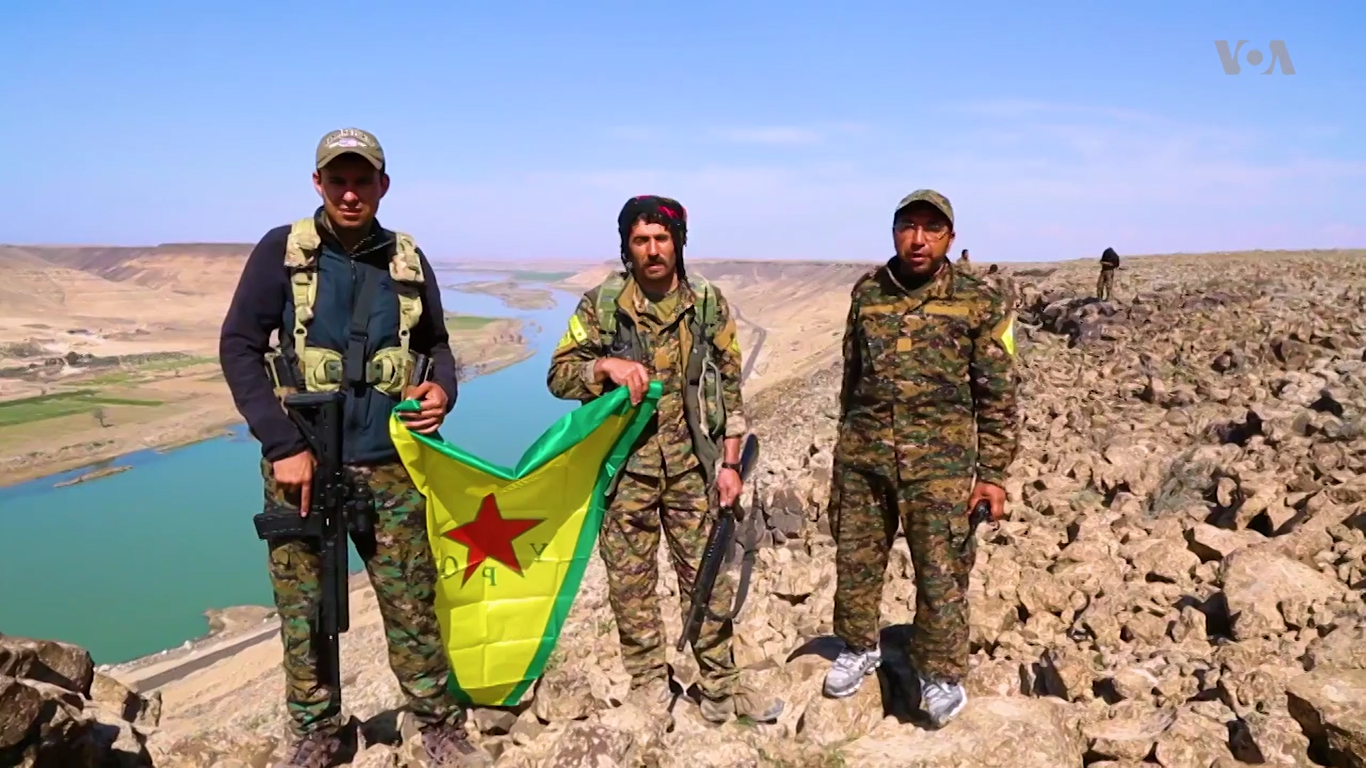
YPG/SDF fighters on the bank of the Euphrates east of Raqqa

The offensive resumed on 5 March, with the SDF capturing at least seven villages and 15 hamlets to the northeast of the Euphrates River, east of Raqqa. The offensive had previously been paused due to bad weather, according to the SDF. The area captured by the SDF on that day was about 19 square kilometers, and about 32 ISIL militants were killed in the clashes. After further advances on 6 March, the SDF cut the highway between Raqqa and Deir ez-Zor, which was the last road out of the city, and reached the Euphrates River. The SDF captured six villages, the Al-Kubar Military Base (a former nuclear facility), and the Zalabiye Bridge, during the day. On 8 March, the SDF took control of the strategic West Menxer hill in the eastern countryside, while elements of the US 11th Marine Expeditionary Unit were deployed to northern Syria, bringing with them an artillery battery of M777 howitzers to support the attack on Raqqa. Meanwhile, about 150 ISIL militants from Hama and Deir ez-Zor managed to reinforce Raqqa, by crossing the Euphrates, despite the partial siege that had been imposed by the SDF on the city.

On 9 March, SDF captured the strategic East Menxer hill and captured three villages on two different fronts. Two villages, including Kubar, were captured on the front to the far east of Raqqa, and one near Raqqa. 244 Arab fighters from the Raqqa countryside also joined the SDF during the day, for the protection of the people in the region. On the next day, the SDF advancing from the Abu Khashab front captured three villages, including two near Kubar. On 12 March, the SDF captured Khas Ujayl village, to the southeast of Raqqa, on the Abu Khashab front, while ISIL continued to launch repeated counterattacks in the area, in an attempt to check the SDF advances. Meanwhile, 230 ISIL fighters entered Raqqa to reinforce the city.

On 14 March, the SDF captured the Khass Hibal village, as well as the Al-Kulayb grain silos, along the Raqqa-Deir Ezzor highway. An SDF spokeswoman stated that Raqqa had been isolated. The advance of the SDF put them in control of the land region used by ISIL to connect to their territories in the east, stretching from al-Kubar to the northern bank of the Euphrates and measuring 30 kilometres (19 mi). The SDF captured the Hamad Asaf silos and al-Qulayb village the next day. Hamad Assaf was also reportedly captured. On 17 March, a YPG commander stated that the SDF planned to storm Raqqa city in April 2017, and that the YPG would be participating in the attack, despite the fierce opposition from the Turkish government. However, Pentagon Spokesman Jeff Davis denied that any decision had been made regarding when and how an assault on Raqqa city would be carried out. Meanwhile, clashes continued to take place around Khas Ujayl.

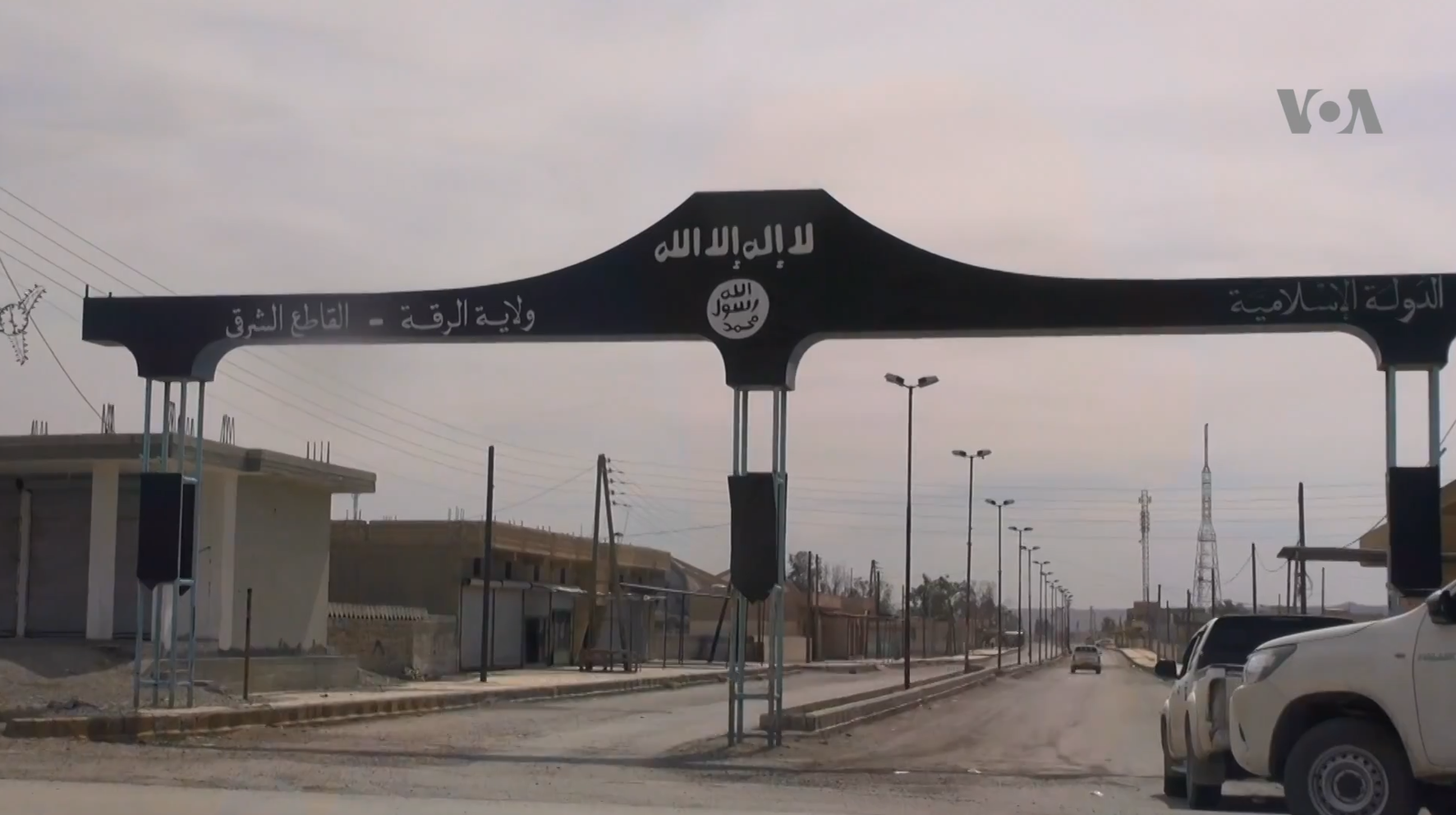
The town of al-Karama, after the SDF had captured it from ISIL

Heavy clashes took place in the town of al-Karama, to the east of Raqqa, on 19 March. On the next day, SDF captured al-Karama, along with Jarqa village as well as a train station and water pumping station nearby. On 21 March, it was reported again that the SDF had captured Hamad Assaf in the eastern countryside from the Abu Khashab front. Another village was captured on 22 March from the Abu Khashab front. Meanwhile, Syrian Observatory for Human Rights (SOHR) and Raqqa is Being Slaughtered Silently (RIBSS) stated that coalition airstrikes hit a school being used as a shelter for displaced people in a village to the west of Raqqa on 20 March. SOHR stated that 33 civilians were killed in the airstrikes while RIBSS stated that it was unknown what happened to 50 families who were there. The SDF continued advancing in the eastern Raqqa countryside on 23 March, capturing two more villages on the Abu Khashab front, allowing them to capture a small ISIL pocket. On 24 March, the SDF took control of two more villages in the eastern countryside of Raqqa.

=== Battle for al-Tabqa countryside and other advances ===
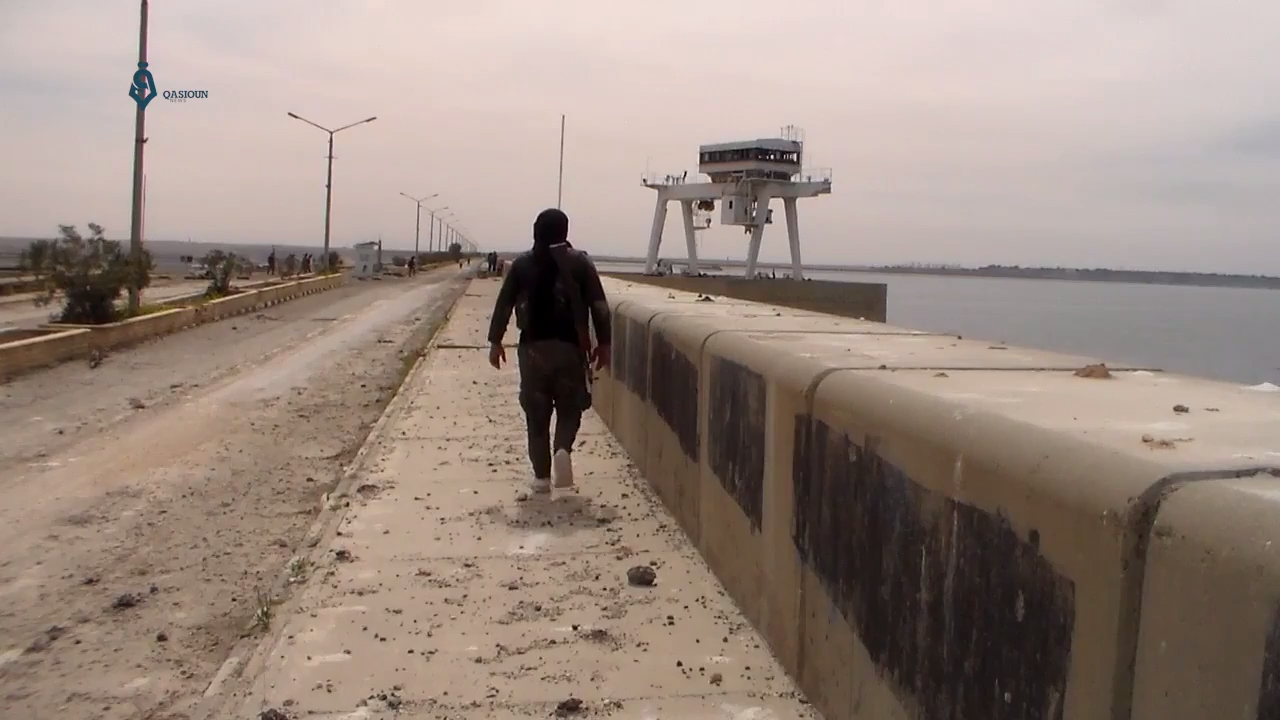
SDF fighters near Tabqa Dam on 27 March

On 22 March, the SDF began an assault to capture the Tabqa Dam, al-Thawrah (Tabqa) city, and its airbase. Five hundred SDF fighters and five hundred US Special Forces from CJTF–OIR were airlifted by helicopters of the United States military, across the Euphrates River and Lake Assad, and were dropped on the Shurfa Peninsula to the west of Al-Thawrah. The attack was supported by artillery support from United States Marines, as well as air support. SDF and US forces also landed on the Jazirat al-'Ayd Island (or Peninsula) to the west of Tabqa Dam, capturing it as well. Four villages southwest of Tabqa were captured in the attack, including Abu Hurayrah, al-Mushayirafah, al-Krain, and al-Jameen. The SDF advanced towards the town of Al-Thawrah, where fliers were dropped, asking residents to stay indoors and avoid clashing against ISIL for now. These fliers were also dropped on Raqqa city. An anti-ISIL coalition spokesman announced that the advance had cut off the highway linking the Aleppo, Deir ez-Zor, and Raqqa Governorates. He added that around 75–80% of the attacking force consisted of Arab fighters, with the rest being Kurds. The SDF stated that the advance was also meant to block any advance on Raqqa by the Syrian Arab Army from the west.

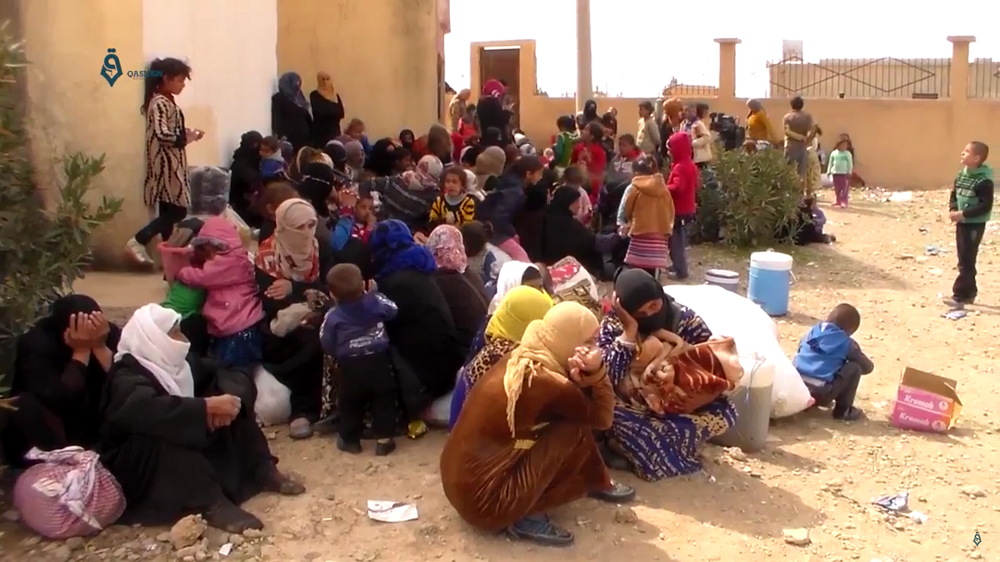
Refugees from al-Thawrah (Tabqa) city, who had fled from the fighting between the SDF and ISIL

On the same day, SDF and US forces stormed the Tabqa Dam, triggering "intense" clashes with ISIL forces. US officials stated that it may take several weeks to capture Tabqa Dam, Al-Thawrah city, and the surrounding countryside from ISIL. Airstrikes by the coalition on Tabqa city were reported to have killed about 25 civilians. On 23 March, some early reports circulated that the SDF had captured Tabqa Dam from ISIL, after clashing with ISIL forces for a few hours. However, these reports were unconfirmed by other sources, with neither the SDF or CENTCOM confirming the capture of Tabqa Dam, and Rudaw reported that the SDF was still preparing to capture it. SDF spokesman Talal Silo stated during the day that they were still advancing on the dam and the city and expected to attack the dam soon. ISIL's Amaq News Agency later denied that the SDF had captured the dam.

On 24 March, SDF spokeswoman Jihan Sheikh Ahmed announced that they had reached the Tabqa Dam, and were fighting ISIL at its entrance. The assault on the dam was spearheaded by SDF fighters who were backed by United States Special Operation Forces. According to early reports, the SDF and its allies had taken its outer perimeter, with the battle ongoing for its middle. On the same day, it was also reported that the SDF had captured 8 villages to the southwest of Al-Thawrah. On the same day, the SDF advanced on Al-Tabqa Airbase, setting off clashes in the vicinity. Amaq meanwhile claimed SDF had withdrawn from the dam.

On 26 March, the SDF captured 2 villages to the east of Al-Thawrah. It was also reported that ISIL was shelling the surroundings of Tabqa Dam with heavy weaponry. On the same day, ISIL claimed that Tabqa Dam was on the verge of collapse and that all the floodgates were closed. The dam was reported to have become inoperable, which ISIL claimed was due to Coalition bombing and artillery strikes, though the SOHR stated that the actual reasons were unknown, adding that ISIL still held its main building and turbines. SDF however denied that it had been hit, while RIBSS (Raqqa is Silently Being Slaughtered) stated that ISIL was informing fleeing civilians that the dam was safe. Additionally, the US-led Coalition stated that the Tabqa Dam was structurally sound, and that the dam had not been targeted by any airstrikes. They also stated that the SDF controlled an emergency spillway at the northern part of the dam, which could be used in the event of an emergency. On the same day, SDF spokesman Talal Silo announced that SDF had stormed the Tabqa military airport, and had taken sixty to seventy percent of it. They later announced that they had completely captured the Al-Tabqa Airbase, following a 24-hour battle. ISIL forces stationed at Al-Tabqa Airbase were reported to have withdrawn northward, to Al-Thawrah city. Additionally, the SDF captured 2 villages near the airbase during the advance.

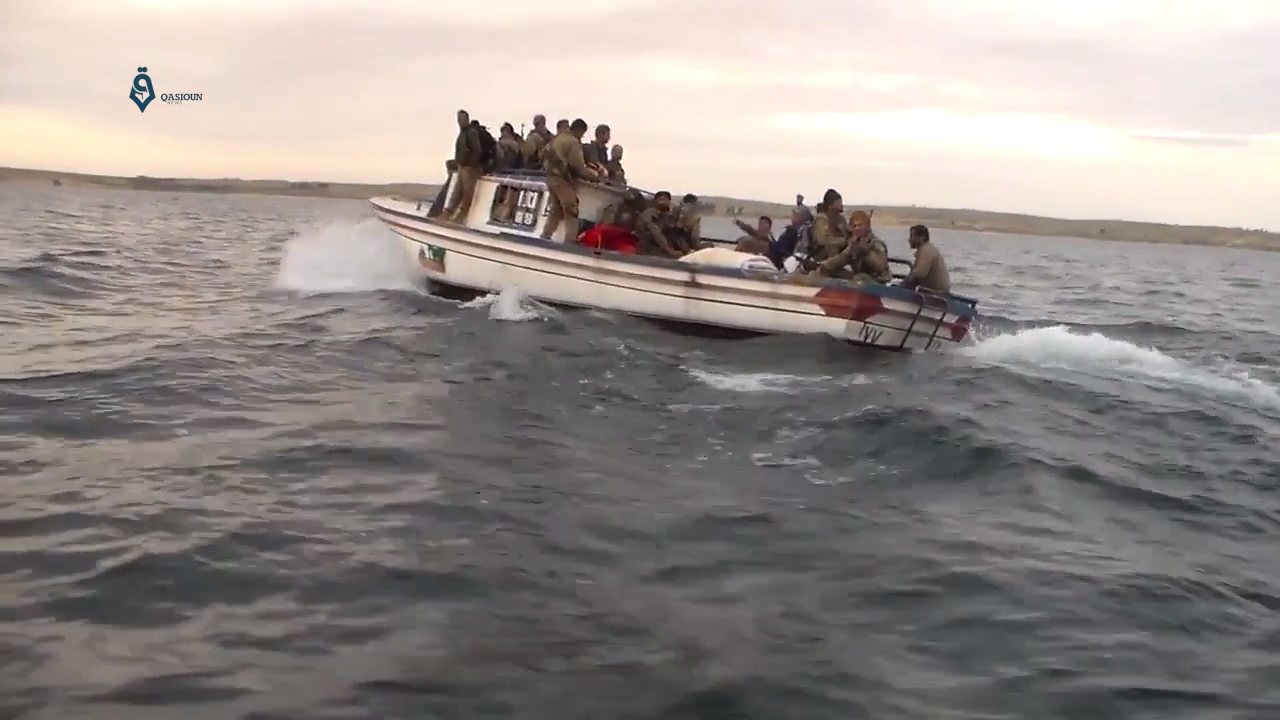
A boat carrying SDF fighters across Lake Assad on 9 April 2017

Late on 26 March, it was reported that the SDF had taken full control of Tabqa Dam, and that repairs on the dam by Coalition engineers had begun. A day later however SDF announced they were temporarily pausing their offensive for the dam. Later in the day, a spokeswoman of the SDF announced that engineers who had been permitted to check the dam and its operations did not find it was damaged or malfunctioning. SDF also captured 2 villages to the west of Raqqa on the same day. It resumed the offensive against ISIL at the Tabqa Dam on 28 March. Syrian engineers worked on the dam during a pause in the fighting to open spillways and ease the pressure on the dam. Its southern reaches were reported to be under ISIL control. ISIL claimed that the maintenance team was killed in airstrikes by the anti-ISIL coalition while the SOHR stated that it had learned that the engineer administering the dam had been killed in airstrikes along with a technician. It also stated that the group had sent 900 fighters from Raqqa to fight against the SDF advance.

On 29 March, the SDF cut the road between Al-Thawrah (Tabqa) city and Raqqa. The SDF stated that ISIL had shelled the Tabqa Dam during the day, causing repair work to be temporarily paused. On 31 March, the SDF attacked the town of al-Safsafah, to the east of al-Thawrah, in an attempt to besiege the city. On the same day, the Ajeel tribe of Raqqa announced its support for the SDF's Raqqa campaign and sent 150 fighters. Meanwhile, leaflets were dropped on the city calling on ISIL to surrender. Clashes continued in the countryside of Tabqa on next day as both sides attempted to advance.

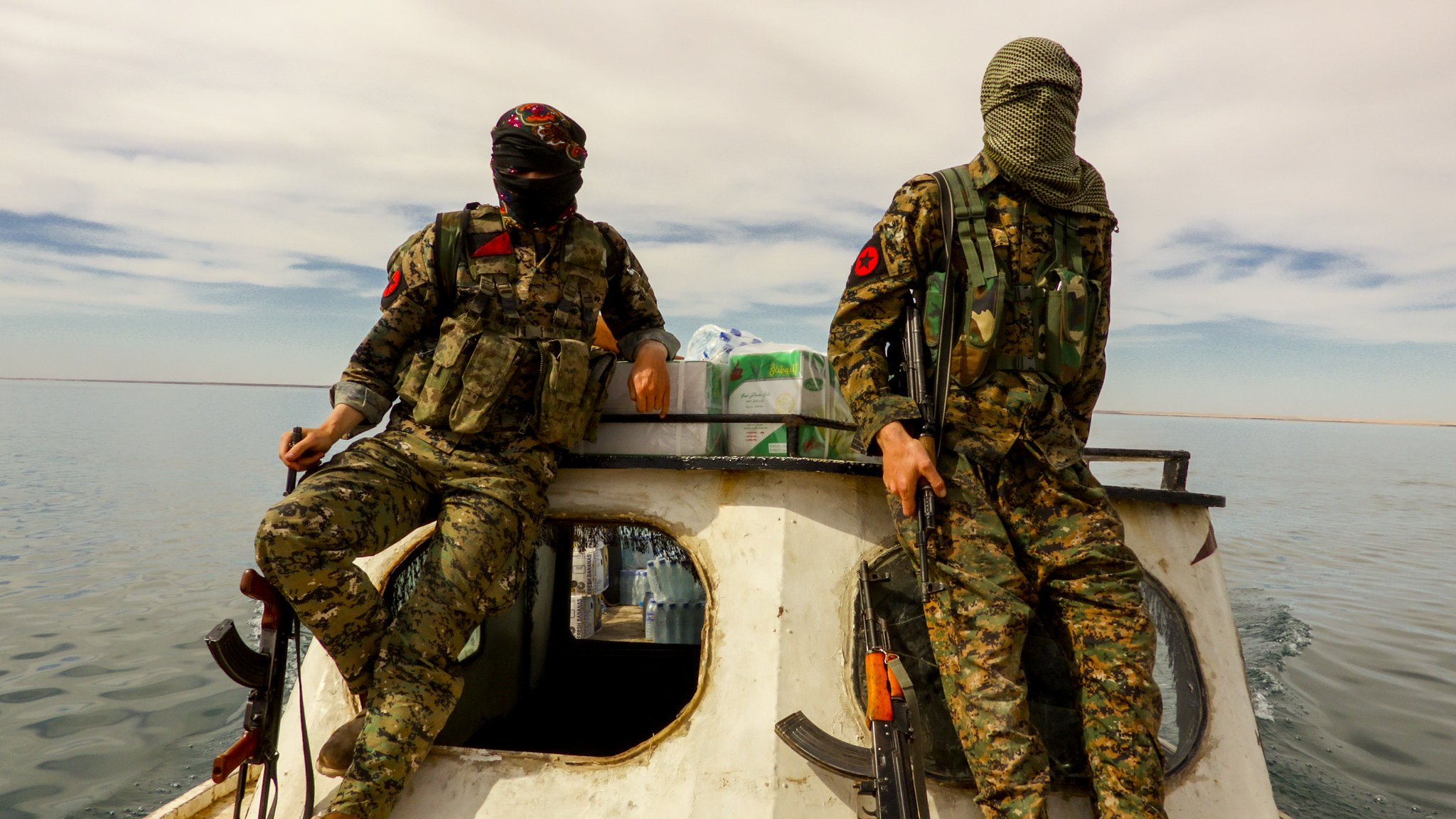
IRPGF fighters crossing Lake Assad by boat

The SDF and some activists stated on 2 April that it had repelled a major ISIL counterattack to the northeast of Tabqa city, near the Tabqa Dam and near the Tabqa airbase. They also continued to advance in villages to the east of Tabqa city. On the same day, it was reported that SDF had completely besieged Al-Thawrah (Tabqa) city, with Kurdish activists stating that 2 SDF units linked up to the east of the city. SOHR, however, stated that they were still trying to besiege the city. SDF fighters continued battling for Safsafah and Ibad, on the next day, to fully encircle Tabqa. On 3 April, it was reported that ISIL was possibly in the process of moving its capital from Raqqa city to Mayadin, in the Deir ez-Zor Governorate. This followed months of gradual relocation of resources and senior ISIL leaders from Raqqa to Mayadin. SDF entered and besieged Safsafah on 5 April, thus also besieging Tabqa city while claiming that it had also taken control of a major part of Safsafah. The village was captured by the next day, resulting in SDF completely encircling Tabqa city.

On 6 April 2017, US Special Forces carried out a raid near the city of Mayadin, in the Deir ez-Zor Governorate, killing Abdul Rahman al-Uzbeki, a high-ranking ISIL commander who was believed to have masterminded the 2017 Istanbul New Year terror attack.

The SDF captured Ibad village, to the east of Safsafah, on 9 April, further expanding their control in eastern countryside of Tabqa, while more than 25 ISIL fighters were killed in the clashes. ISIL also launched unsuccessful counterattacks on Safsafah, while also attacking Al-Tabqa Airbase. The SDF captured another village near Tabqa on the next day.

On 11 April, the US-led Coalition reported that the SDF had captured 60% of Tabqa Dam, and that they were "very close" to liberating the dam. On 13 April, the United States military stated that CJTF–OIR had bombed a SDF fighting position near Tabqa as it was misidentified as belonging to ISIL. It added that the airstrikes resulted in deaths of 18 SDF fighters.

=== Phase Four: Offensive directly north of Raqqa city; Assault on Tabqa city ===
Map of the progress of the Battle of Tabqa

On 13 April, the SDF announced the launch of the fourth phase of the campaign. The new phase would involve capturing the entire area directly north of Raqqa city, including the Jalab valley, as well as further strengthening the siege of Raqqa city. The advancements may involve capturing the southern countryside of Raqqa as well, since the SDF stated that they plan to fully isolate the city before launching an attack on it. A plan to attack Raqqa city itself was also scheduled to for April 2017, but it was postponed due to the Battle of Tabqa. SDF was reported to have captured a village in the northern countryside of Raqqa on the same day.

SOHR stated early on 15 April that the SDF had advanced to the edge of Tabqa, and was within hundreds of meters of the city. Later, SDF captured the village of Ayad al-Saghir near Tabqa and stormed the city itself, capturing the Alexandria suburb and bringing about 15% of the city under their control. They also cleared the Mushayrifah village near Tabqa, killing 27 ISIL fighters.

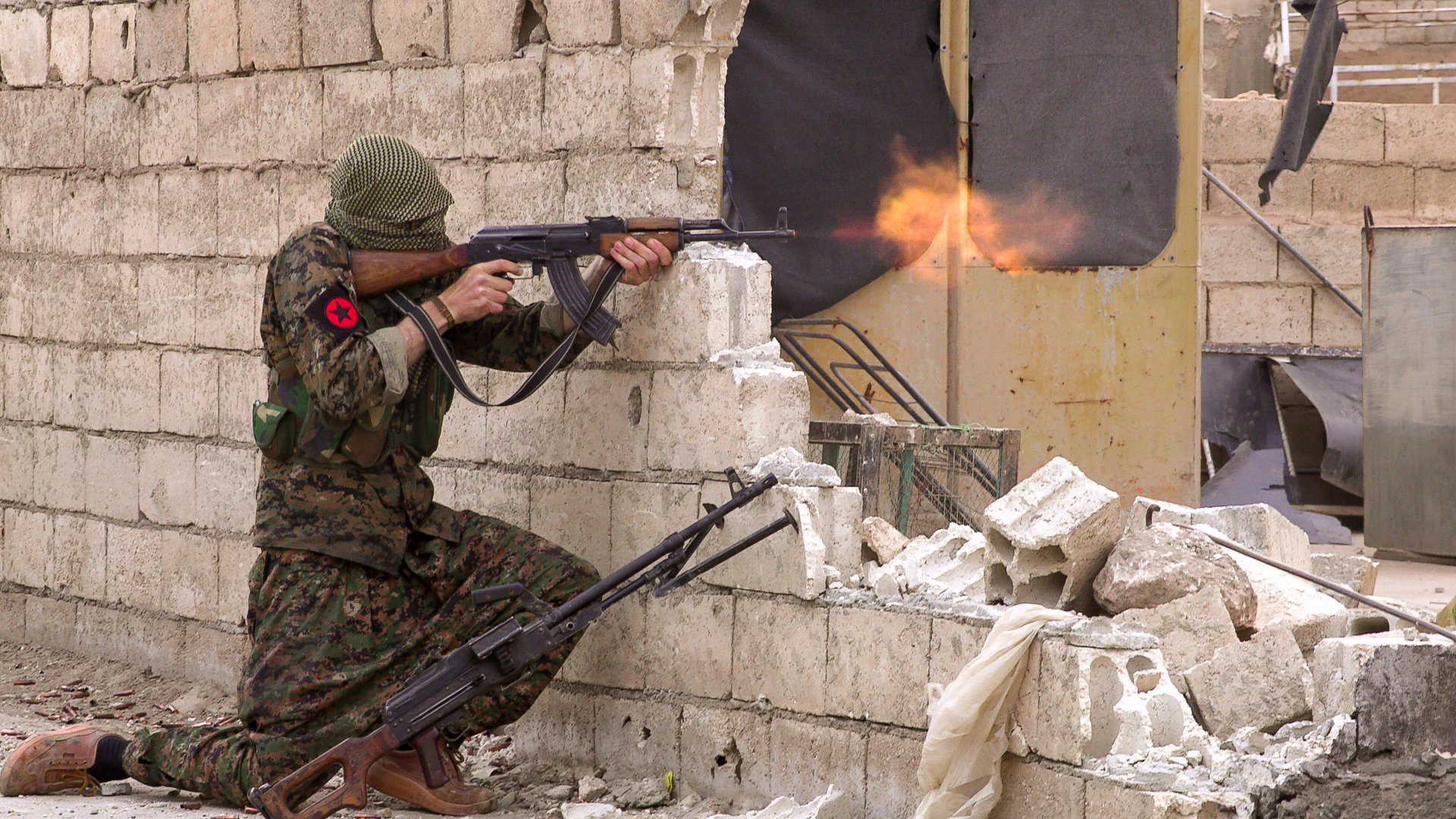
An IRPGF fighter during the Battle for Tabqa city

On 17 April, the SDF captured three villages in the northern countryside of Raqqa, and four hamlets. On the same day, the Manbij Military Council announced that 200 of its fighters would participate in the battle for Tabqa, with a total of 350. SDF advanced in Tabqa city again on 17 and 18 April, also capturing an ISIL radio station. On 19 April, SDF captured 4 villages near Raqqa as well as other areas. On 20 April, they captured at least six villages to north of Raqqa. More villages and areas were captured by the SDF north of Raqqa on 21 and 22 April, including Hazima and Mazrat Tishrin. Meanwhile, it was reported that ISIL had essentially moved its capital to Mayadin, in the Deir ez-Zor Governorate, and that ISIL had centered its forces in the Deir ez-Zor Governorate, thus transforming Mayadin into a "secondary capital city" for ISIL. On 24 April, the SDF captured the ISIL pocket to the north of Raqqa city, allowing them to gain control of 13 villages.

By 25 April, the SDF captured the Wahab district of Tabqa city, during a large advance in its southern and western flanks, which increased SDF control of the city to 40%. The SDF also destroyed an ISIL cell in Jazirat al-Ayd, allowing them to completely secure the island. Meanwhile, the two SDF fronts north of Raqqa were reported to have joined up, following the capture of a number of villages in a former ISIL pocket. The SDF also announced that it had captured the northern part of Julab Valley. They announced on 28 April that they had captured the Nababila and Zahra districts of Tabqa city. Meanwhile, the YPG also threatened to withdraw from the operation to capture Raqqa, if the United States didn't take measures to stop Turkey's attacks against the group.

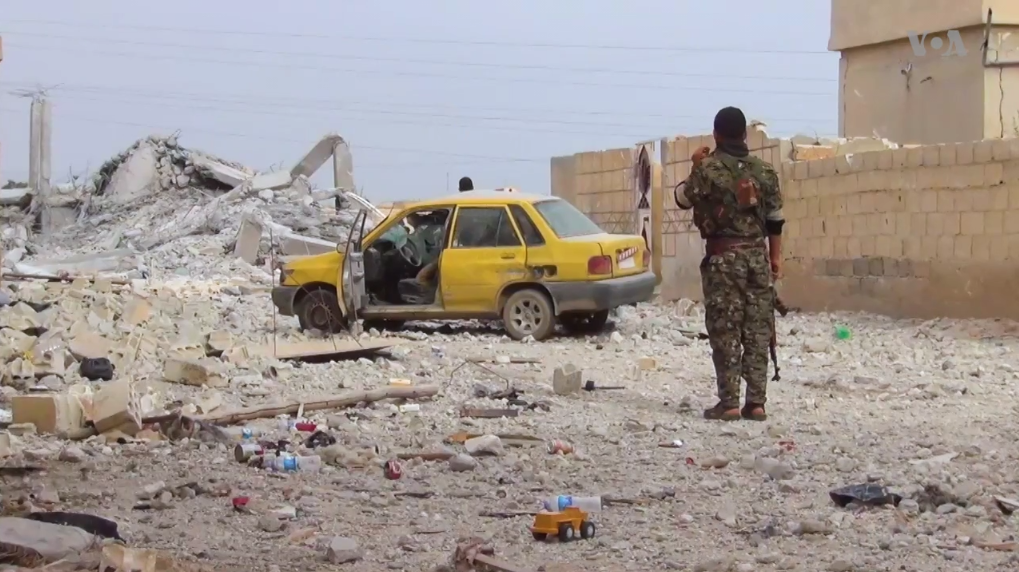
A SDF fighter stands in a destroyed area of Tabqa city.

SDF advanced in Tabqa city again on 30 April. They stated that they had captured six more districts, and that ISIL only controlled the northern part of the city near Tabqa Dam. SOHR stated that SDF controlled at least 40% of the city, including more than half of the Old City area. Later on the same day, it was reported that the SDF had captured at least 60% of the city. On the next day SDF stated that it had completely captured the Old City area, leaving ISIL in control of only the newer areas of the town alongside the dam. SOHR stated that they controlled about 80% of the city.

On 2 May SDF stated that it had captured about 90 percent of the town amid reports of negotiations between Kurdish fighters and ISIL to allow the latter to withdraw from the remaining areas under its control. By 3 May, SDF had almost captured the whole city except a small northern area and district near the dam. ISIL also carried out counterattacks in and near Tabqa. It was later reported that a deal had been reached to allow remaining ISIL fighters to withdraw from the city as well as the dam. SDF and its commanders however denied any deal had been reached, adding that clashes were still ongoing against ISIL in a village near Tabqa and the three northern districts of the town including some militants who were hiding among civilians. Also on 3 May, a new batch of 110 fighters of the Elite Forces graduated after training in Al-Hasakah. The fighters are scheduled to participate in the Raqqa campaign.

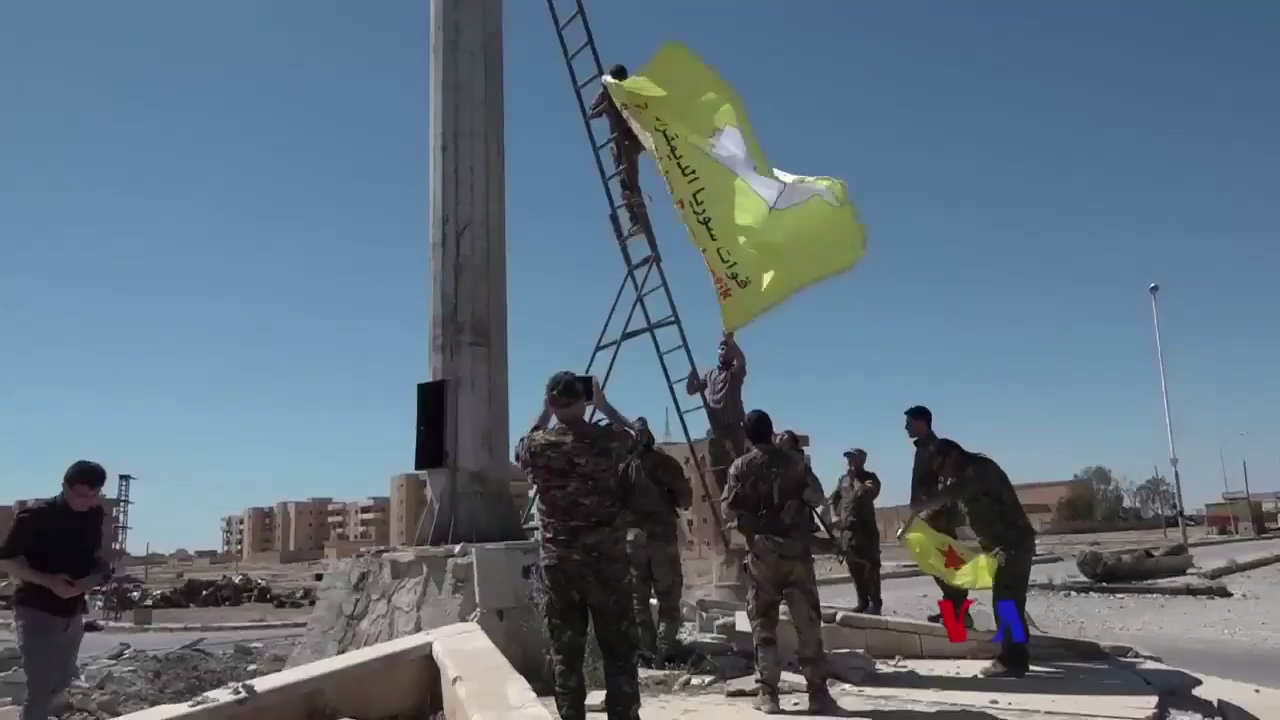
SDF fighters raise their flag in Tabqa.

On 8 May 2017, 100 Arab fighters from northern Raqqa started training to join the YPG, for the Raqqa offensive, with training set to conclude at the end of the month. Also on 8 May, SDF announced that they had captured the First Quarter district of Tabqa city that connects the three newer districts of the town to the dam. The advance cutoff the two remaining suburbs under ISIL control from the dam. In addition, SDF also captured the Watani hospital. It was also reported that SDF had captured the village of Sahel al-Khashab. SOHR reported that although some Syrian ISIL fighters had withdrawn under a deal allowing SDF to take control of the whole town, other fighters who were mostly non-Syrian refused to withdraw and were clashing with SDF as well as waging a guerilla-style battle. On 9 May, the SDF made a press statement announcing the relaunch of the fourth phase of the campaign after a 15-day suspension. The following day, the SDF as well as SOHR announced that the alliance had completely captured the town as well as the dam.

==== Resumption of Phase Four ====
The SDF announced that they had resumed the fourth phase of the campaign on 10 May. On the next day, it was reported that the SDF had captured two to three villages to the north of Raqqa city. Later, they captured another village north of Raqqa. An ISIL counter-attack on Tabqa city was meanwhile repelled. On 12 May, 2 villages in the northern countryside along with a cotton mill were captured. Kurdish news agencies also stated that SDF had captured a local ruling party headquarters as well as prison used by the militants. By 14 May, SDF captured three to four villages to the north of Raqqa. About seven to eight villages were captured by SDF in the region till 17 May, along with about 17 hamlets also reported captured.

On 18 May, SDF captured a village located to the east of Raqqa. On the next day, two villages along with a farm were captured by the alliance. By 21 May, two villages were captured with SDF advancing within 2 kilometres (1.2 mi) of the Mansoura Dam. By 23 May, another 2 villages were captured near the dam. Another village was captured near the dam later. On 24 May, two villages including the town of Hamrat Nasera were captured by the SDF in the western countryside while a village in the eastern countryside was also reported to have been captured. On the next day, the SDF captured the strategic Kadiran village to the north of the dam. Meanwhile, the Manbij Military Council sent an additional 2,200 fighters. The SDF stated the next day that more than 1,000 men from the al-Tabqa region had joined it on the day.

Following the seizure of six villages on 30 May, the Kurdish-led Syrian Democratic Forces (SDF) continued on the 31st as units were able to take control of Hunaydi village and establish fire control over a section of the M6 highway, a jihadist supply road which runs vertically through ISIS territory in Syria. In addition, ISIL withdrew from the village of al-Assadiah. Effectively, the SDF had then besieged the highly fortified Division 17 military base, located directly north of the provincial capital. Meanwhile, approximately 4,000 ISIS fighters were waiting to fight the SDF in Raqqa.

On 2 June, the SDF captured the town of Mansoura after a 3-day battle. Before the SDF captured it, Mansoura was the largest town still under ISIL control west of Raqqa. By 4 June, the SDF along the US and French Special Forces fully captured Mansoura Dam.

=== Phase Five: Battle for Raqqa city ===
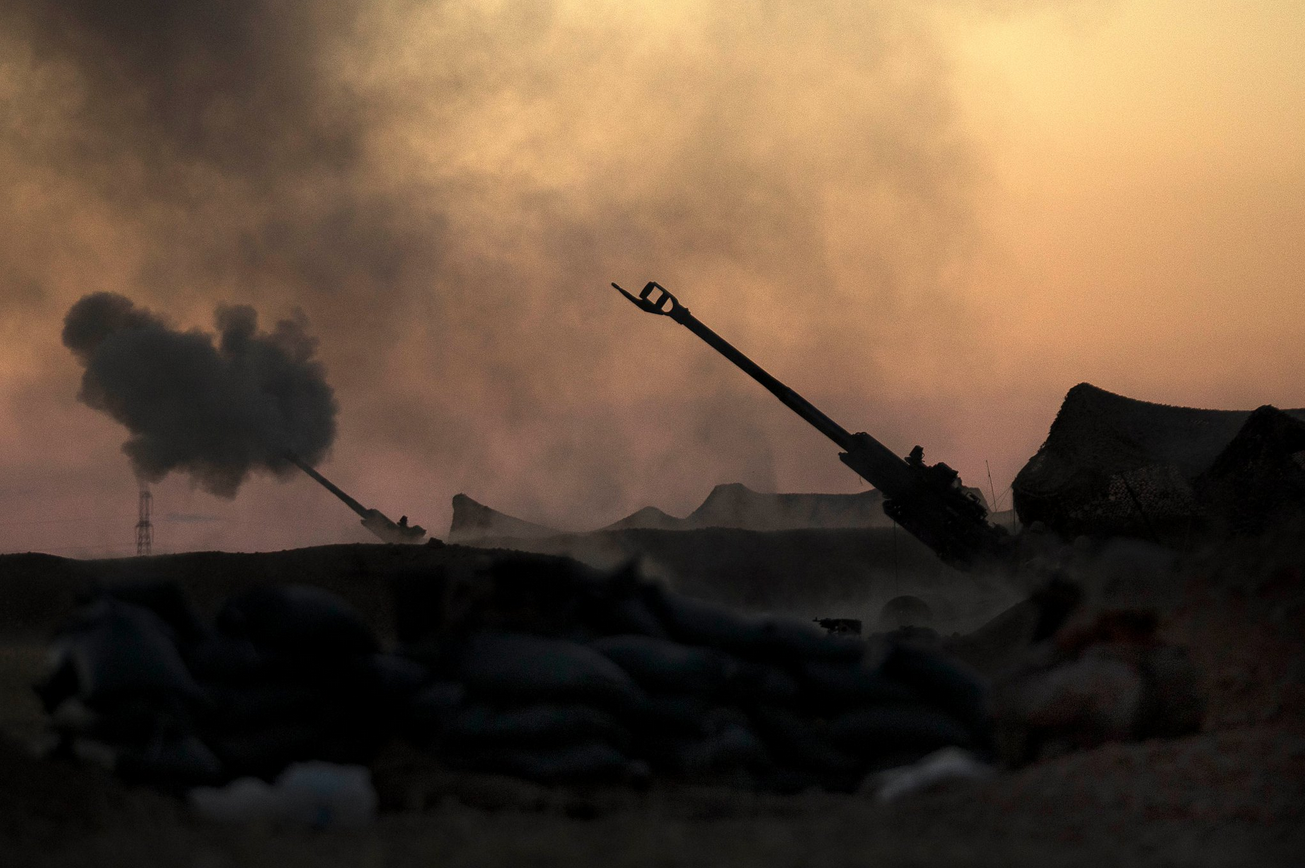
The United States Marine Corps providing fire support for the SDF during the Battle of Raqqa.

Map of the SDF's advances in Raqqa city

On 6 June 2017, the SDF announced the start of the Battle of Raqqa city. The offensive came from Raqqa's north, east, and west. The SDF attacked the 17th Division base and the Mashlab district in the northern part of the city. The battle was earlier announced by SDF to be the "fifth and final phase".

On 24 June, the SDF completely besieged Raqqa city, trapping about 4,000 ISIL militants in the city.

As of the 28 September, around 50% of Raqqa had been "totally destroyed" during the battle.

On 14 October, a group of ISIL fighters and around 400 civilians, reportedly used as human shields by ISIS, evacuated from Raqqa under an agreement with the SDF. The next day, the SDF announced the "final phase" of the battle, code-named the Battle of Martyr Adnan Abu Amjad, to capture the remaining ISIL holdouts in 10% of the city.

On 16 October, the SDF reportedly destroyed the last ISIL forces in the al-Andalus and al-Matar neighborhoods, and finally secured the al-Naim roundabout.

On 17 October, ISIL control in Raqqa officially ended when the SDF captured the National Hospital and the Stadium, though a clear and hold operation was still expected in order to clear out potential remaining pockets of resistance.

Following the end of clearing operations, victory was officially declared by the SDF on 20 October.

== Syrian Army offensive in southern Raqqa ==
On June 12, the Syrian Arab Army (SAA), led by the Tiger Forces, began an offensive on ISIL positions in the western countryside of Raqqa, south of the town of Maskanah, which it recently captured, toward the Ithriya-Tabqa highway, aiming to secure its main supply route to Aleppo. A Hezbollah-run media unit reported that government forces advanced 32 km south of Maskanah, capturing the villages of Rajm Askar, Bir Inbaj, Zahar Um Baj, Jab Aziz, Jab al-Ghanem, Abu Sousa and Jab Abyadin in the process. A source close to the Tiger Forces said that the SAA had occupied all areas west of the Resafa oil field. Al-Masdar News reported that the June 13 advances marked the first time government forces had any presence around SDF-occupied Tabqa in three years. On 18 June, a Syrian Air Force Su-22 was shot down by a US Navy F-18E south of Tabqa; the US military subsequently claimed that the Syrian jet had been intercepted after it had bombed SDF positions. Both the pro-opposition SOHR as well as the pro-SDF Hawar News Agency denied this, however, stating that the jet had not attacked the SDF. The Syrian government said that their Su-22 had bombed ISIL positions when it was destroyed.

On July 15, the SAA captured the Wahab, al-Fahd, Dbaysan, al-Qseer, Abu al-Qatat and Abu Qatash oil fields, south of Resafa. Al-Masdar News reported that the Tiger Forces overran three more fields in the region the following day, including Zamleh Sharqiyah, Bir Zamleh and Al-Khalaa.

== Administration of captured territory ==
=== Civil administration ===
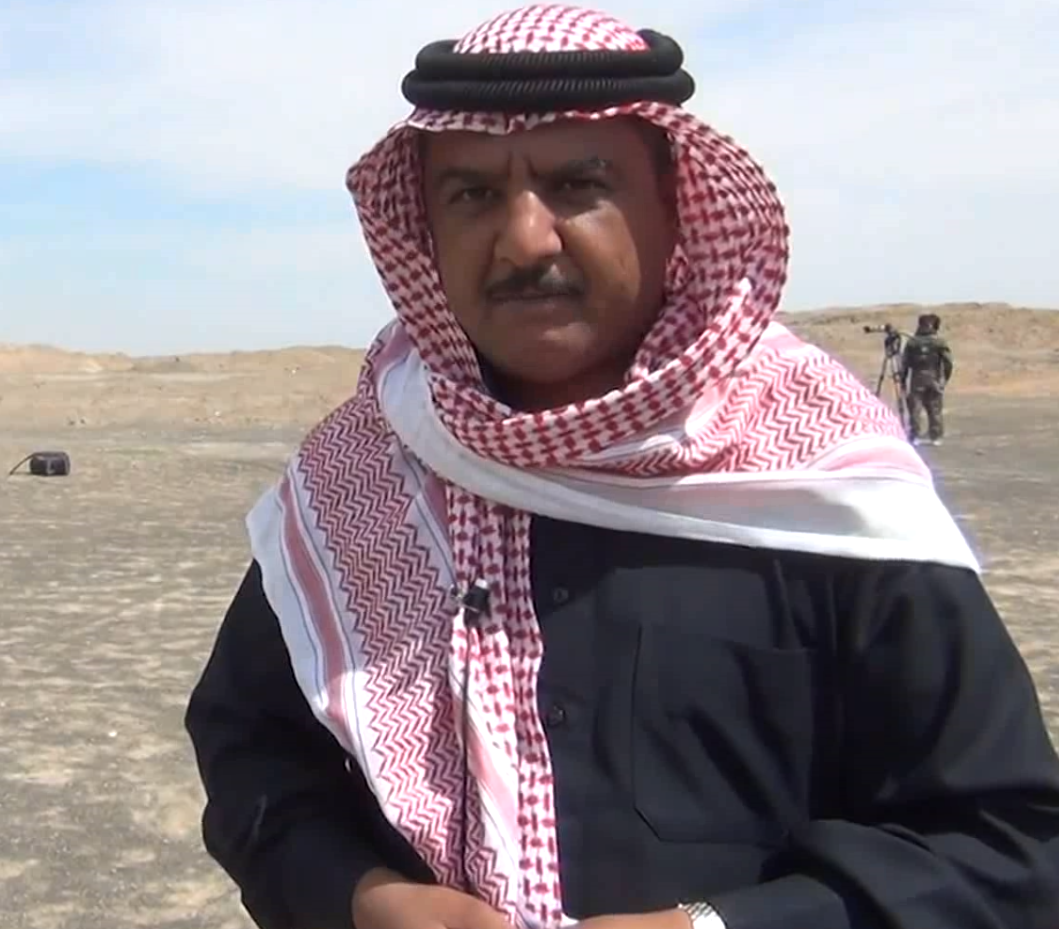
Samer Kharkhi, one of the Raqqa Civil Council's leading members

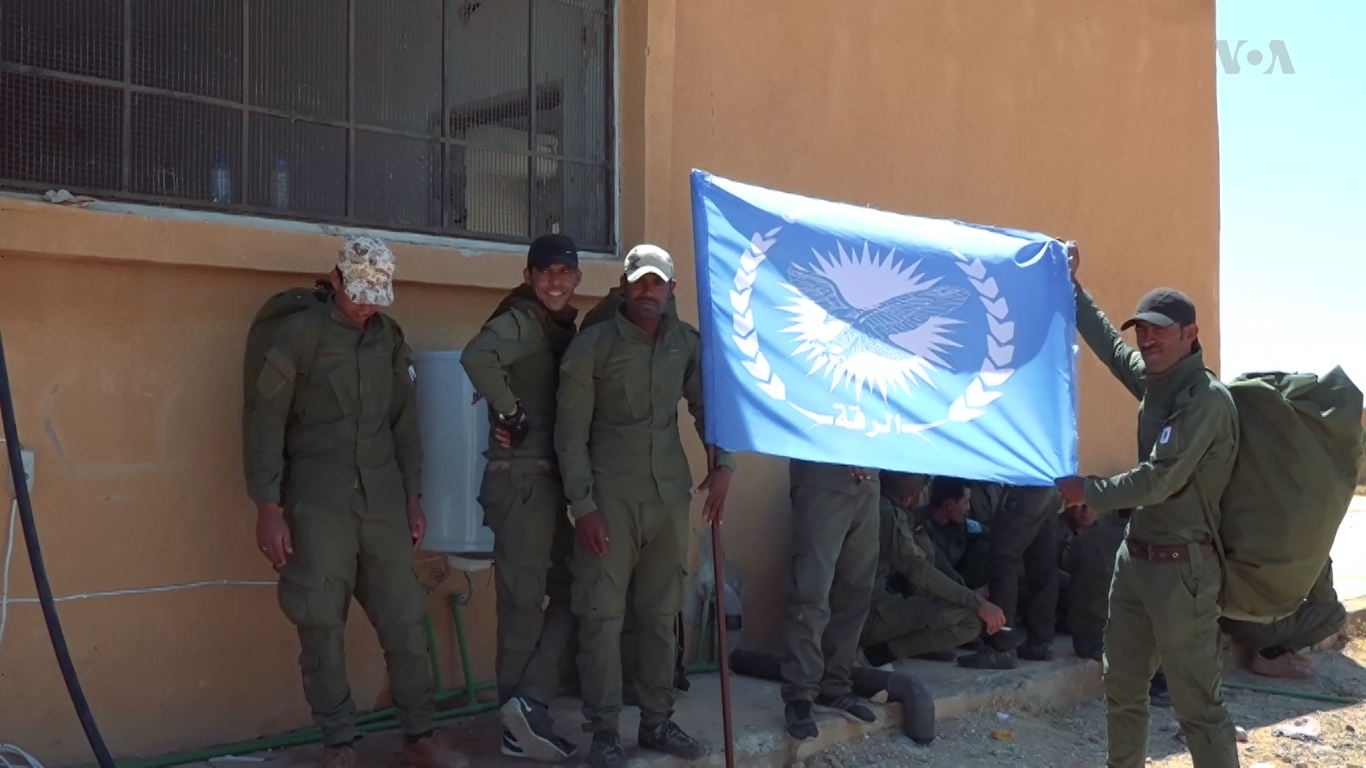
Members of the Raqqa Internal Security Forces with their flag in Ayn Issa

On 14 November, the SDF's civilian sister institution, the Syrian Democratic Council (SDC), started working on the establishment of a civilian administration to run the city of Raqqa after the expulsion of the Islamic State of Iraq and the Levant. SDC co-chair Îlham Ehmed said "such an administration could provide a good example for democratic change in Raqqa, especially that the city has been for years a de facto capital for the ISIS terrorist group. This accomplishment would be a major change in the overall situation in Syria, and would help the country move towards stability, democratic change. Raqqa will be an example for the whole country."

On 8 December, Col. John Dorrian, the Operation Inherent Resolve spokesman, stated that "a governance structure representative of the local population" similar to that in Manbij is planned for Raqqa. On 10 December, Cihan Shekh Ehmed, the spokesman of the SDF-led operation, said that Raqqa would be run by a local elected civilian council after it was liberated. On 27 March 2017, Salih Muslim Muhammad, co-chairman of the Democratic Union Party (PYD), said that as soon as the SDF had captured the city, "the people of Raqqa are the ones who [will] take the decision on everything". If they wanted to do so, Muslim said, they could choose to join the Democratic Federal System of Northern Syria. On the same day, the provisional Raqqa Civil Council announced that it had taken over the administration of the eastern countryside.

During a meeting in Ayn Issa on 18 April 2017 attended by tribal chiefs and local dignitaries from Raqqa, SDF announced the official establishment of a civilian council to govern Raqqa city after it is captured. During the meeting of delegates including representatives from Arabs, Kurds and Turkmen; co-chairs Layla Mohammed and Mahmoud Shawakh al-Busran were elected and 14 committees were established. SDF stated that a military council to provide security to the city after its capture will be formed soon. On 20 April, the new civilian council also began to operate in the areas of Tabqa, handling the distribution of food to local villagers.

On 15 May 2017, an agreement was made to establish a 'Tabqa Civilian Assembly'. This assembly will be temporary as a broader assembly will be established with councils following the return of residents.

On 17 May 2017, the Raqqa Internal Security Forces (RISF) were established as new police unit, with the first training course being set up in Ayn Issa; their purpose is to provide law and order in the areas captured from ISIL during the campaign. As native police, the RISF is supposed to be expanded to at least 3,000 members.

On 20 October, SDF declared that Raqqa and its province will decide its own future "within the framework of a decentralised, federal, democratic Syria". They pledged to protect Raqqa province from external threats and hand over control to a civil council from the city. In a ceremony on the same day, SDF handed over administration of Raqqa city to the civil council while the 3,000-strong United States-trained police force was tasked with governance and security.

=== IDP camp and informal settlement ===
Food, goods and resources have become rare in Raqqa due to clashes, while lives are also at risk from fighting and coalition's bombings. Also, a number of IDP camps and settlement have been set up across northern Syria.

=== Tensions and insurgency ===
On 25 March 2018, protests erupted in Mansoura after a leader of the Bukahmis tribe was arrested by the SDF. Protesters burned tires, and SDF fighters opened fire. The tribal leader was released on the same day. Following the protests, an SDF YPG intelligence officer was killed and his body was dumped on a road near Mansoura. It is unclear if his assassination was related to the protests. After the conclusion of the campaign, the SDF was faced with a continued insurgency by ISIL.

== Gallery ==
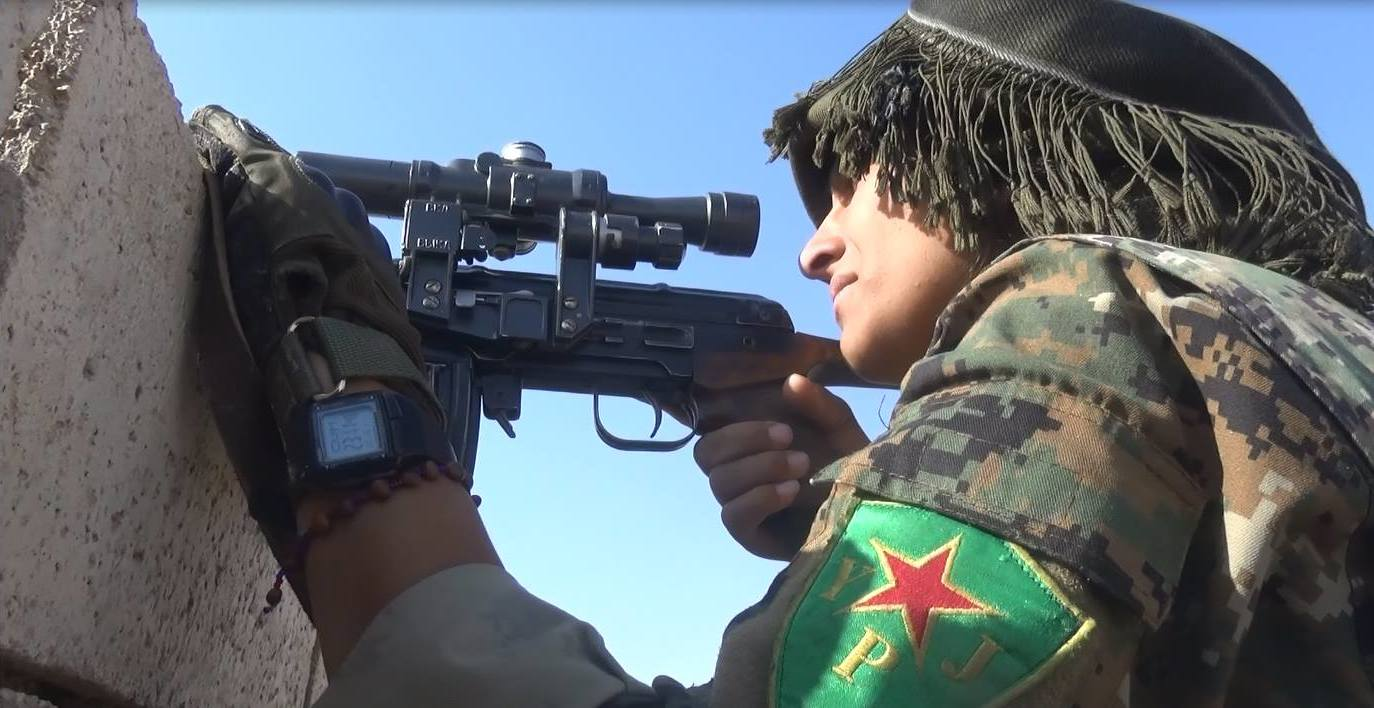
A YPJ sniper during the offensive on 13 November 2016

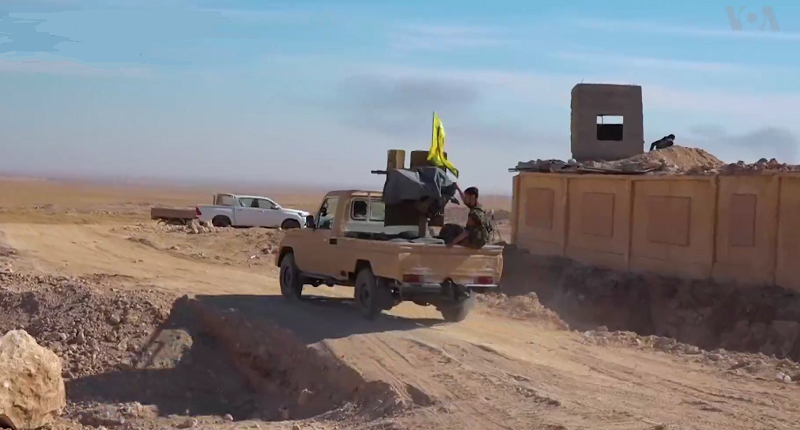
A SDF technical in a village captured from ISIL on 15 November 2016

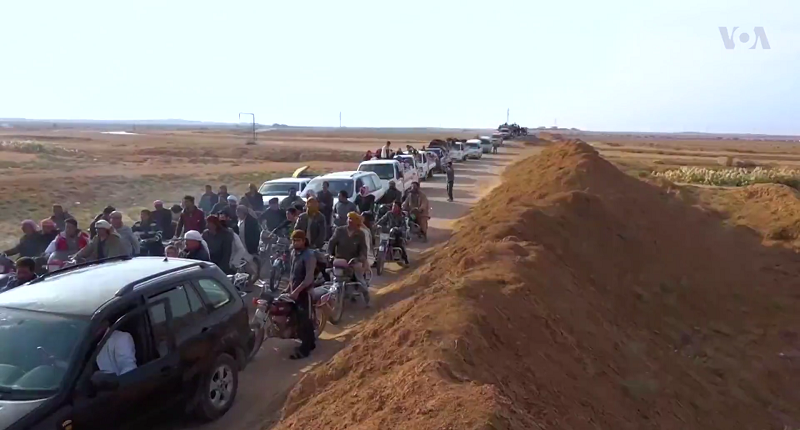
Refugees return to their hometown of Al-Hisbah, after the SDF captured it from ISIL.

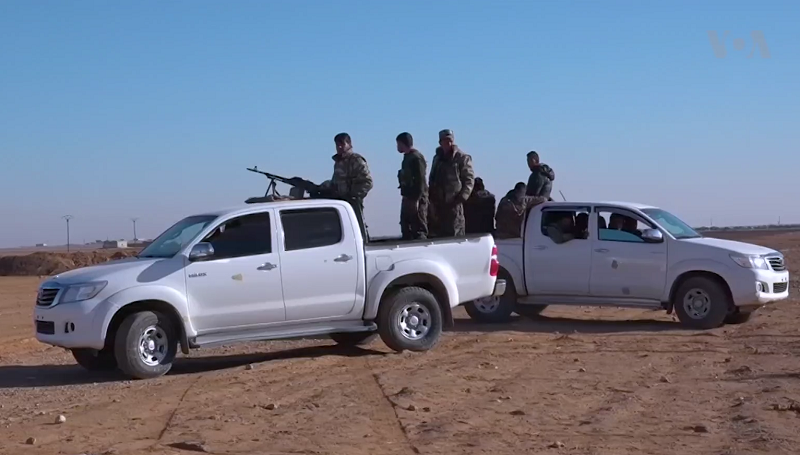
SDF technicals in the northwestern countryside on 12 December 2016

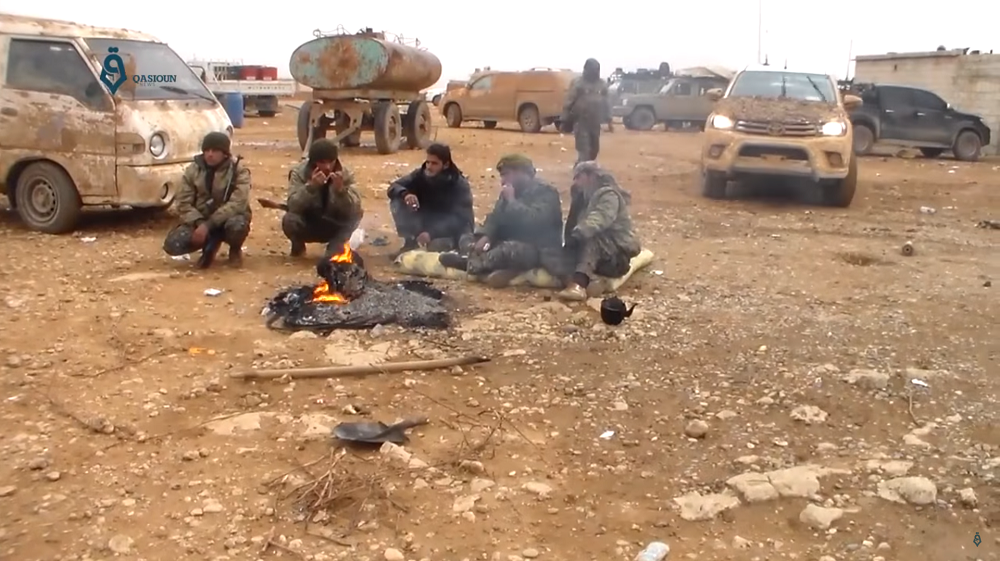
Temporary camp of the SDF near Mahmudli on 17 December 2016

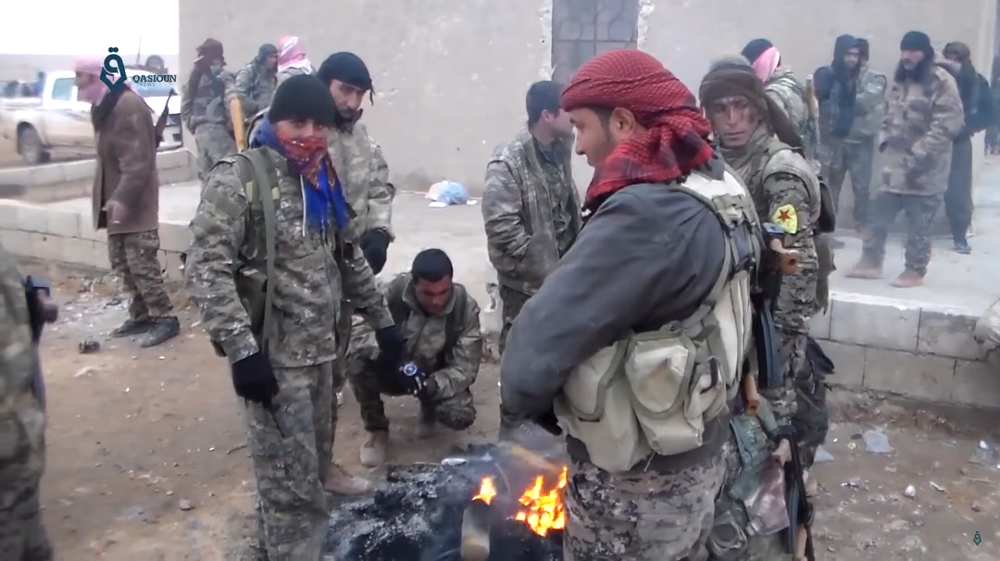
Fighters of the Tell Abyad Revolutionaries Brigade and the YPG warm themselves at a campfire.

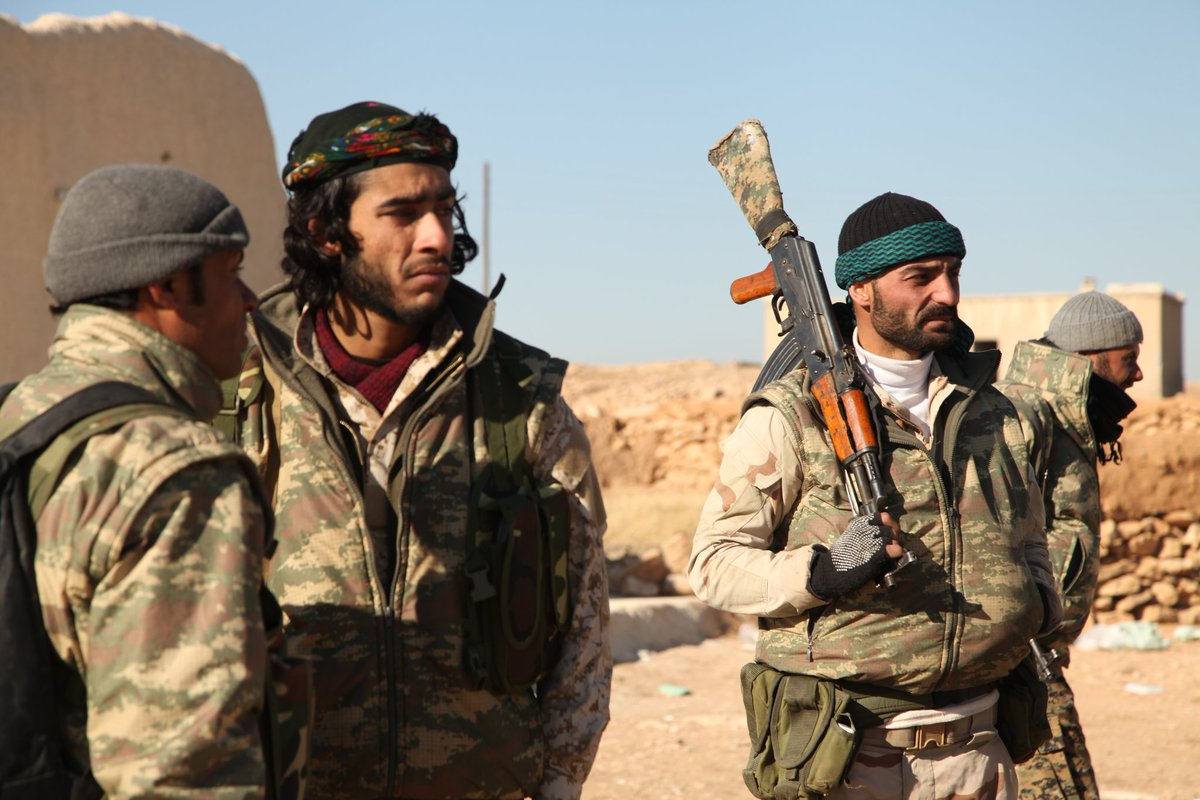
Kurdish YPG fighters during the offensive on 24 December 2016

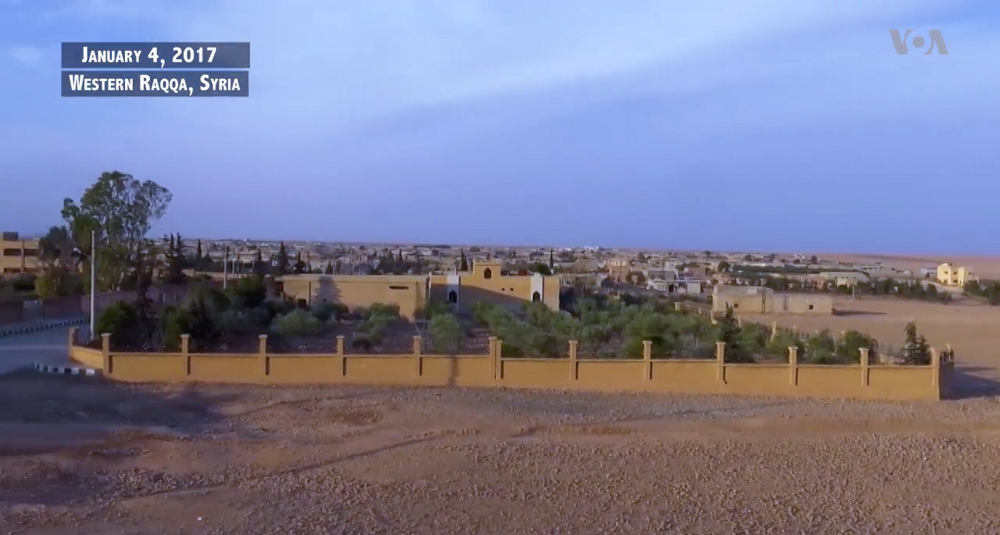
The town of Mahmudli on 4 January 2017, three days after its capture by the SDF

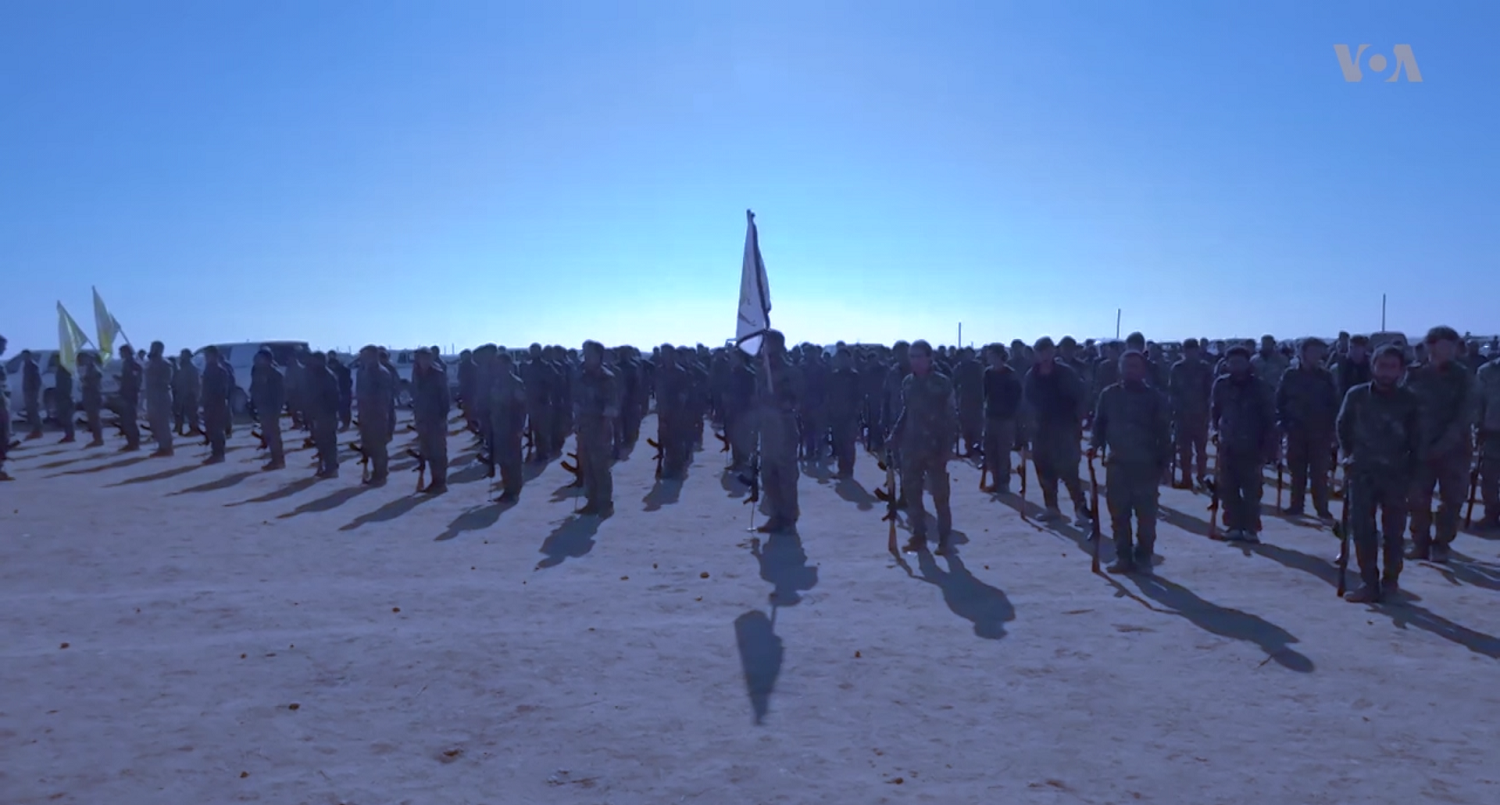
SDF fighters in Mahmudli on 4 January 2017

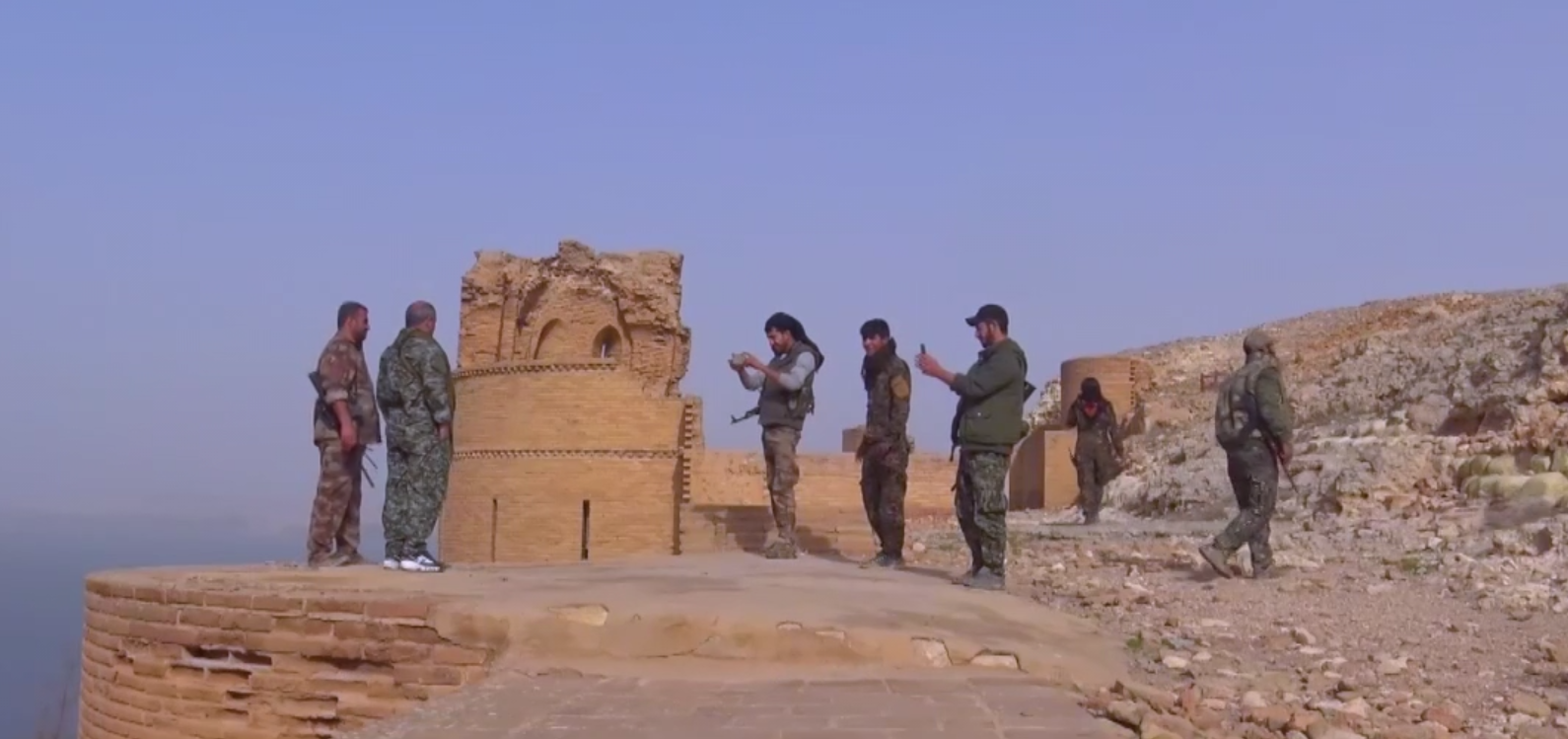
SDF fighters at Qal'at Ja'bar on 10 January 2017

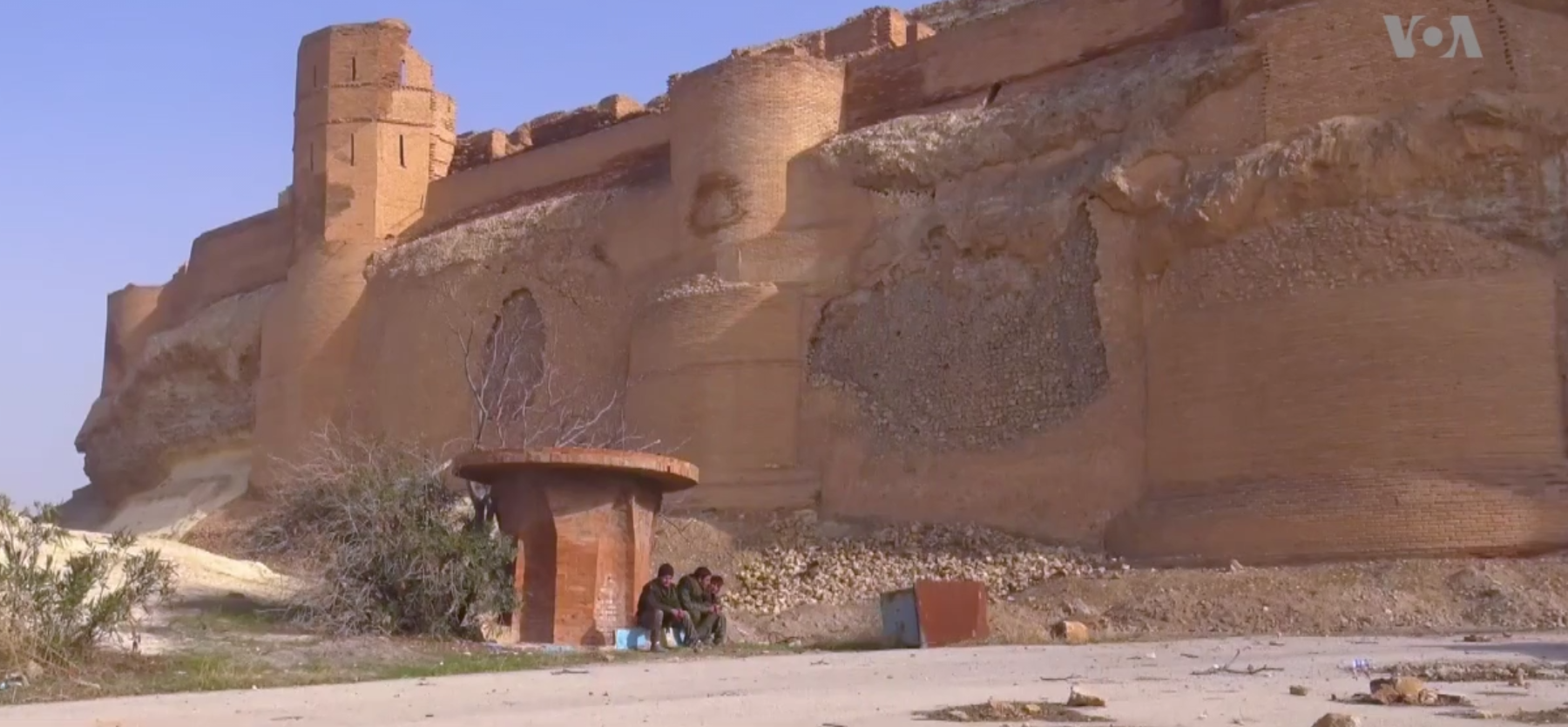
SDF fighters in front of Qal'at Ja'bar on 10 January 2017

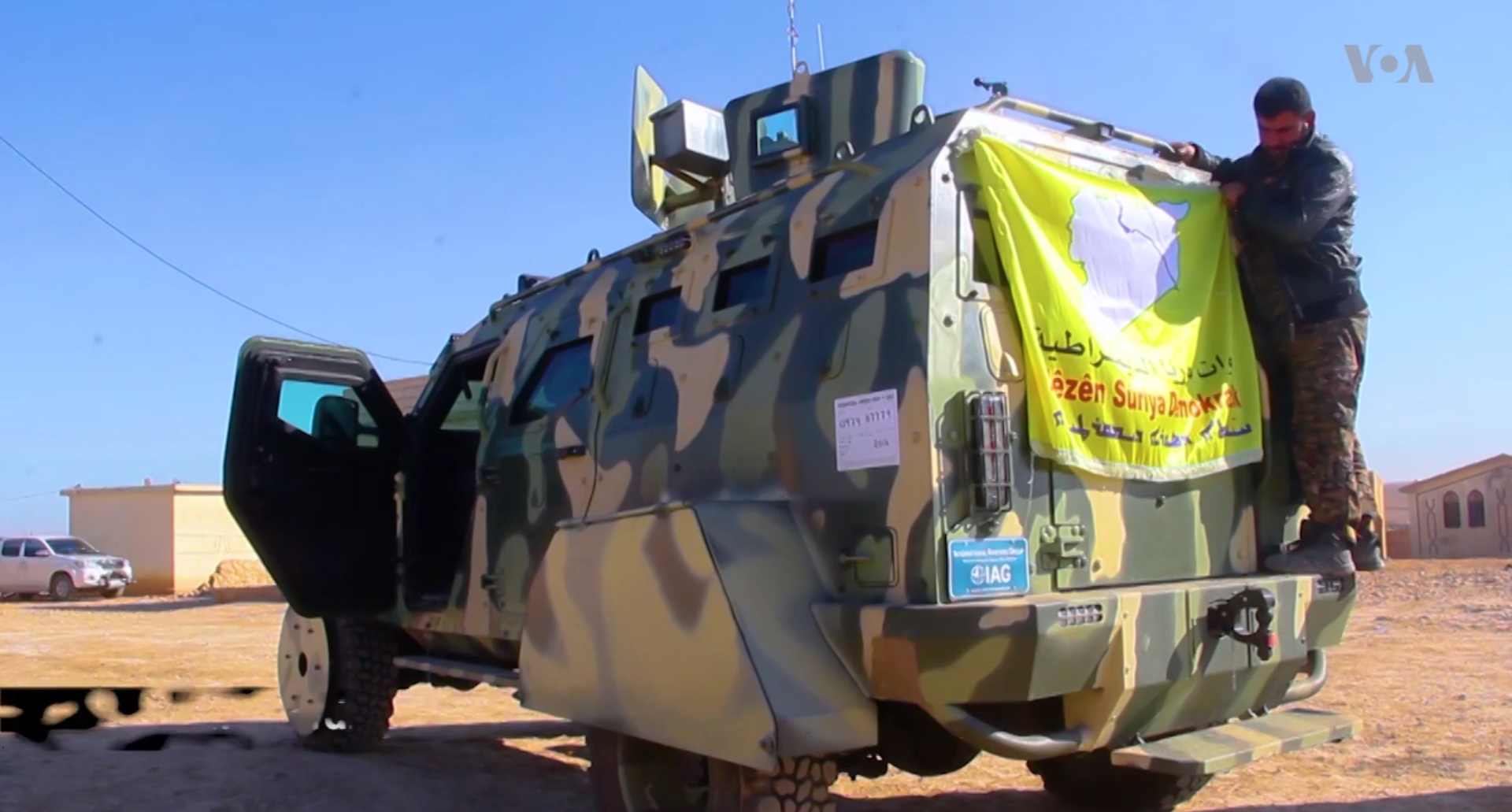
A Kurdish fighter fits a SDF flag on a Guardian armored personnel carrier supplied by the US.

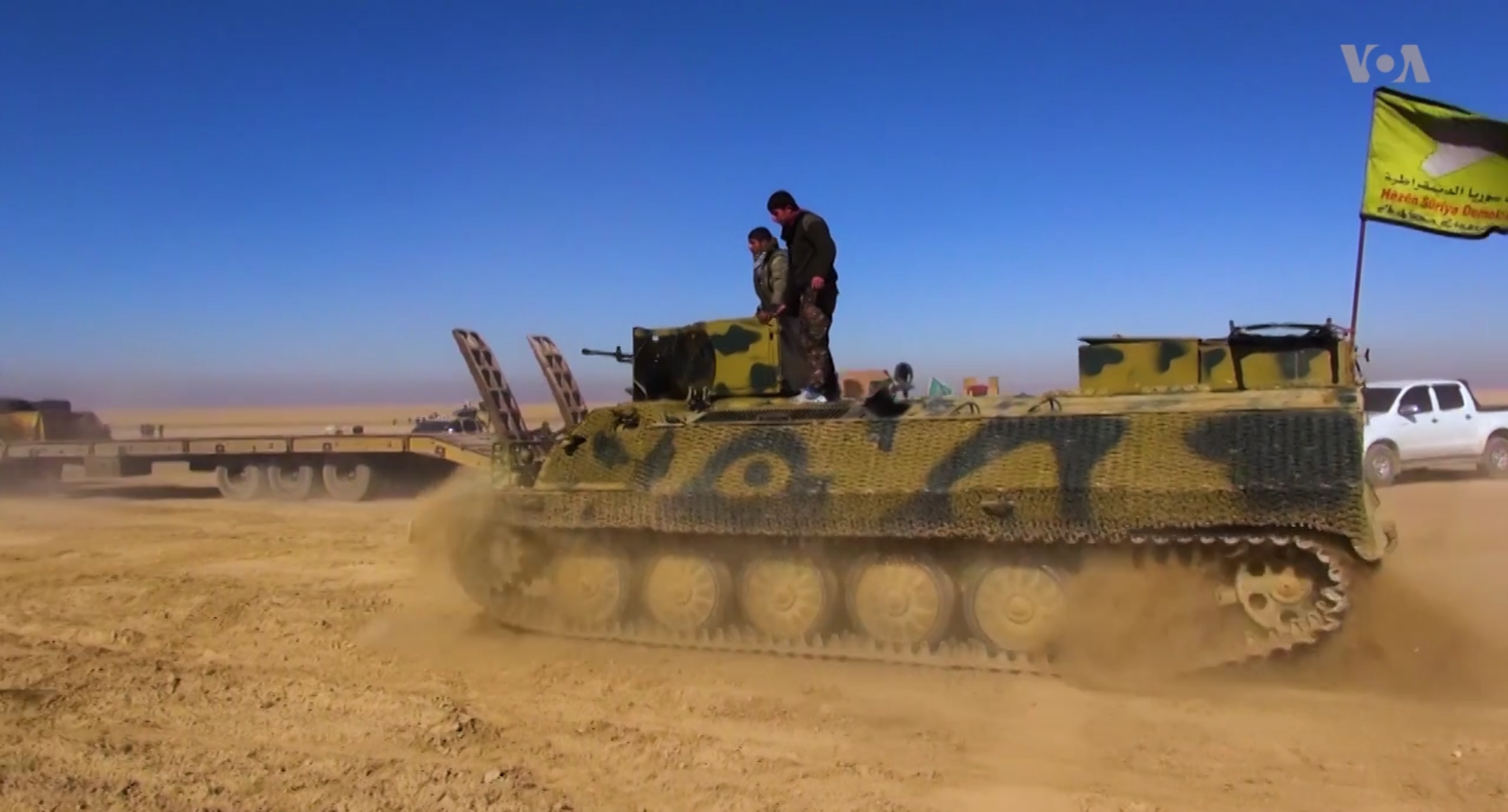
An MT-LB of the SDF during the offensive

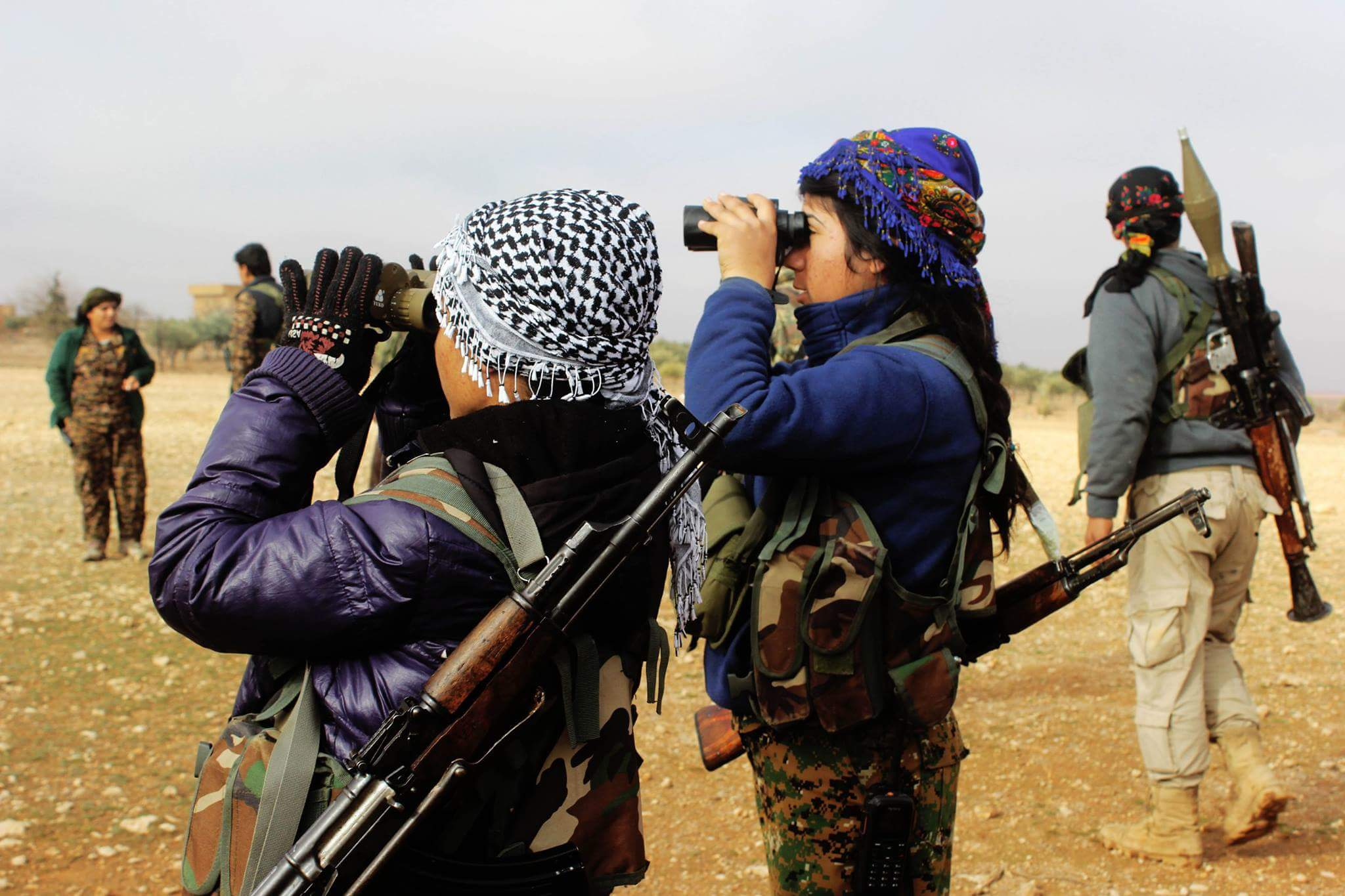
YPJ fighters on 7 February 2017

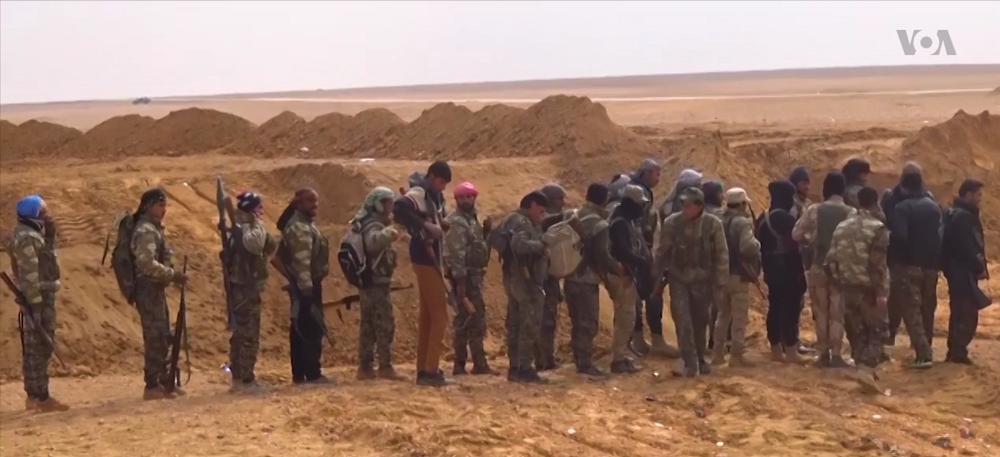
Deir Ezzor Military Council fighters on 9 March 2017

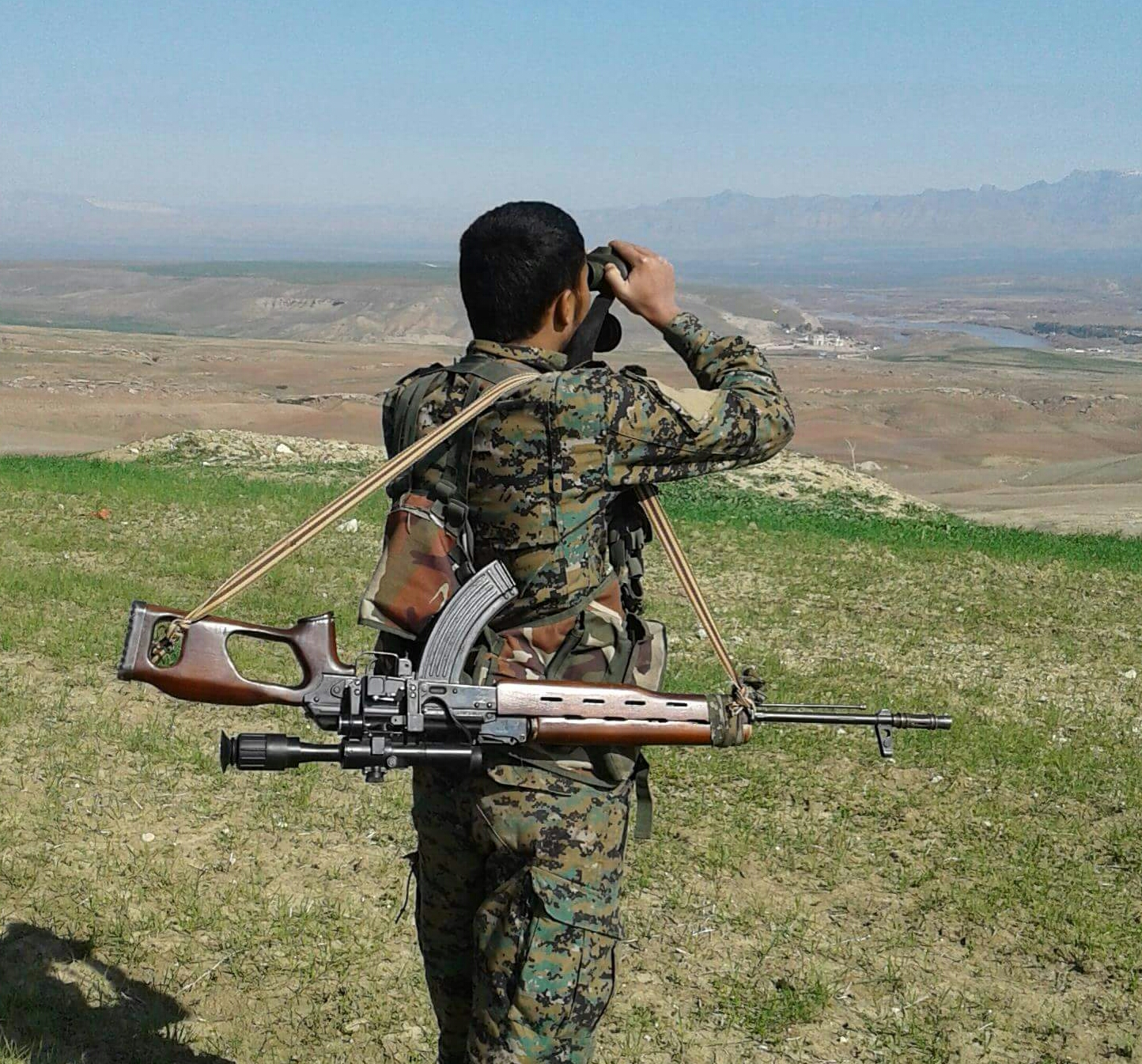
A YPG sniper near the Euphrates

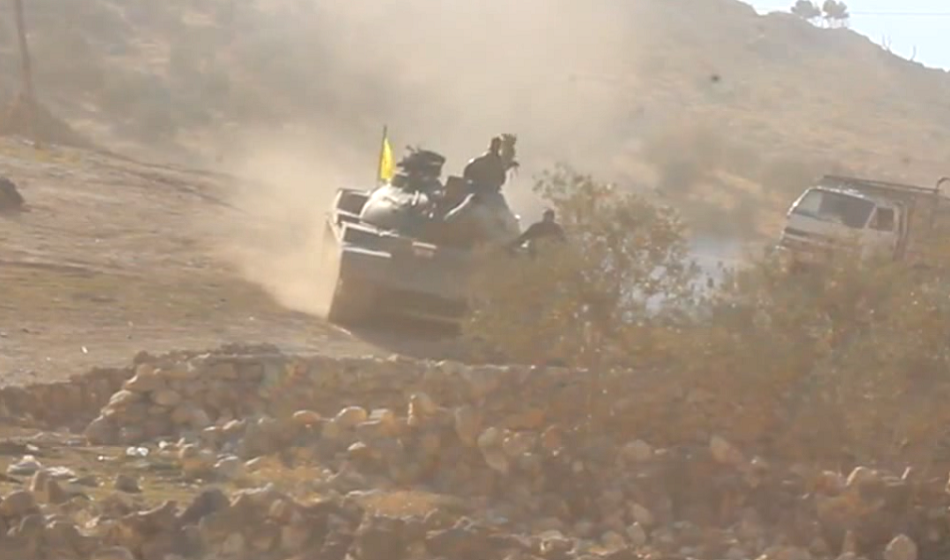
A SDF T-55 during the offensive

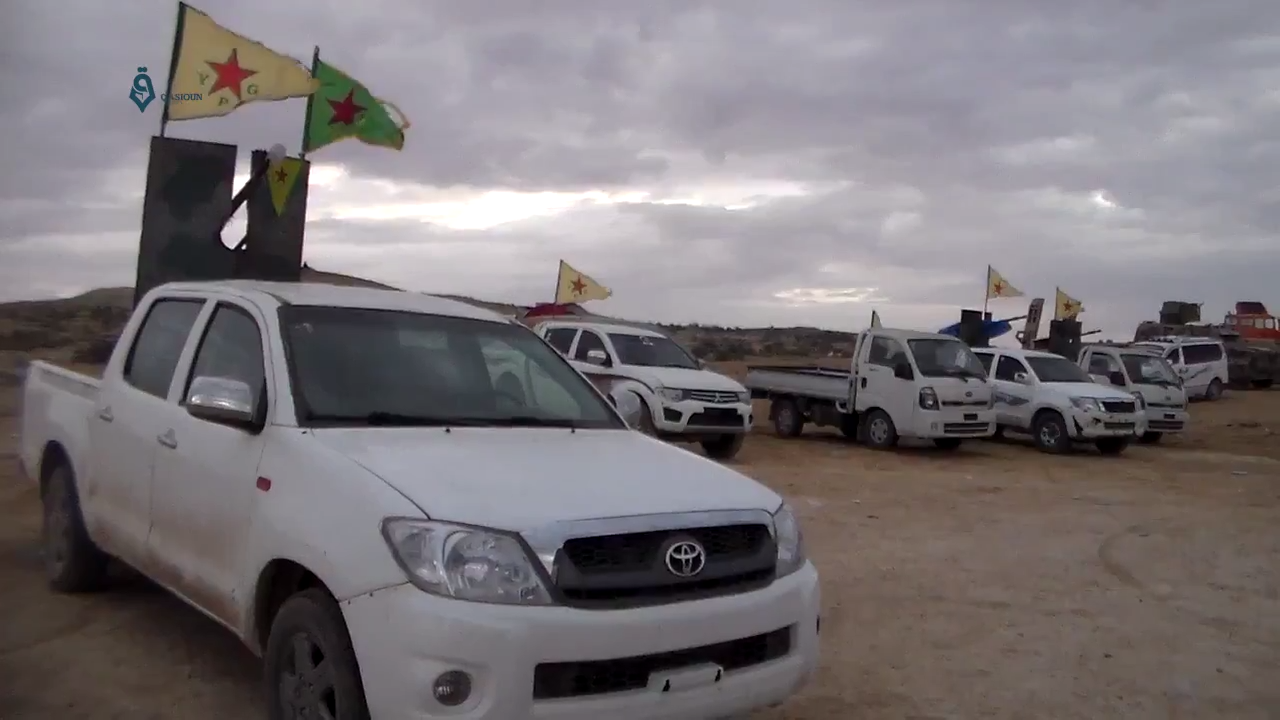
Toyota Hilux and other vehicles of the YPG and YPJ near Tabqa, 9 April 2017

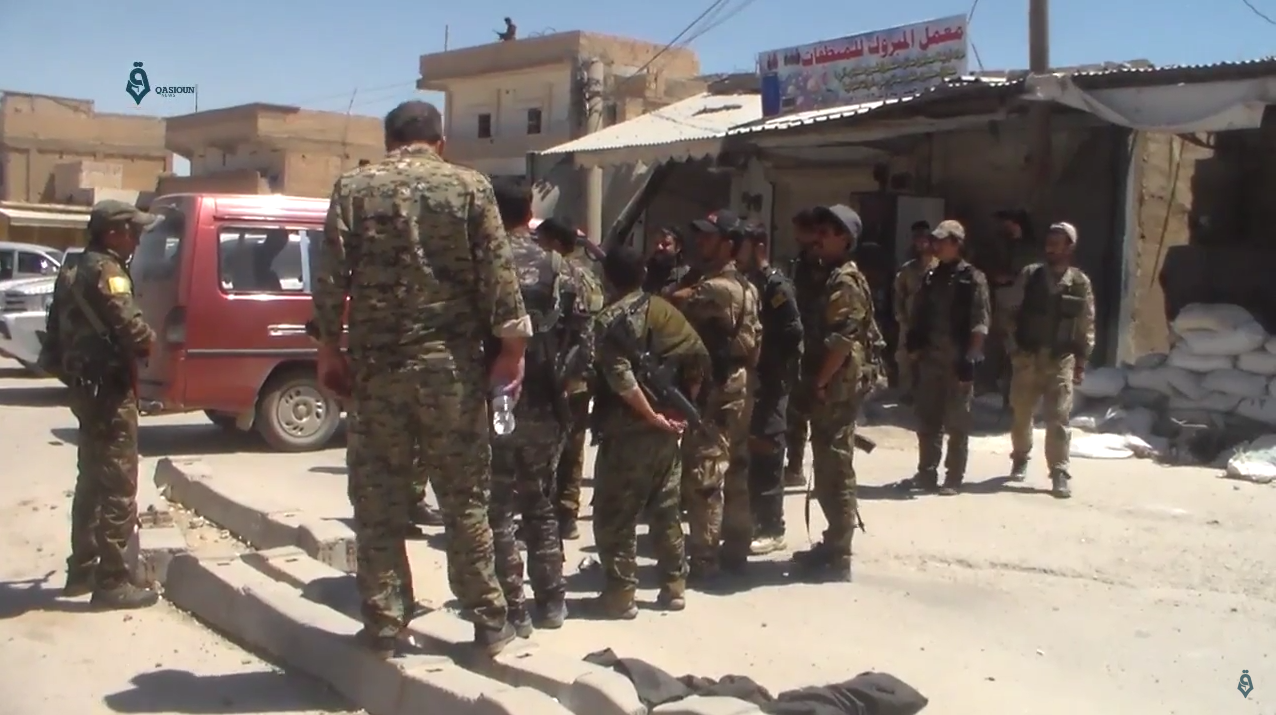
SDF fighters in Tabqa, 13 May 2017

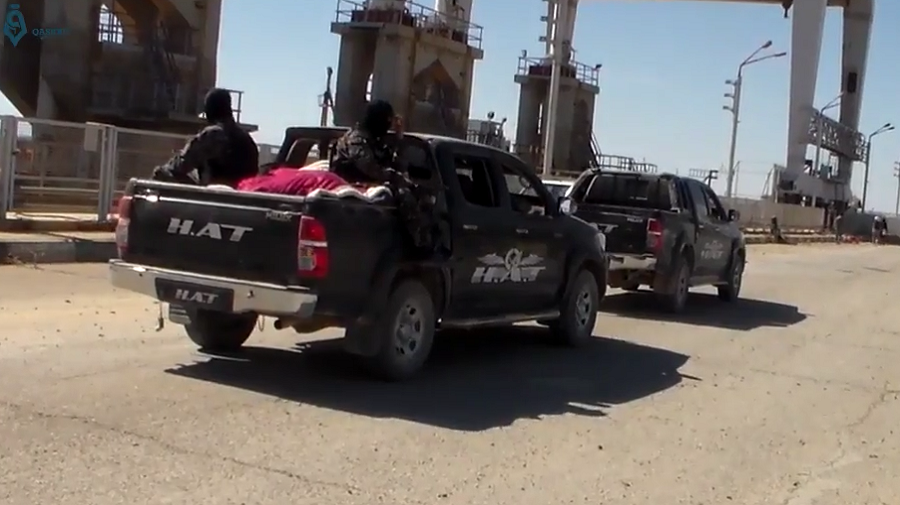
HAT (Asayish SWAT) in Tabqa, 13 May 2017

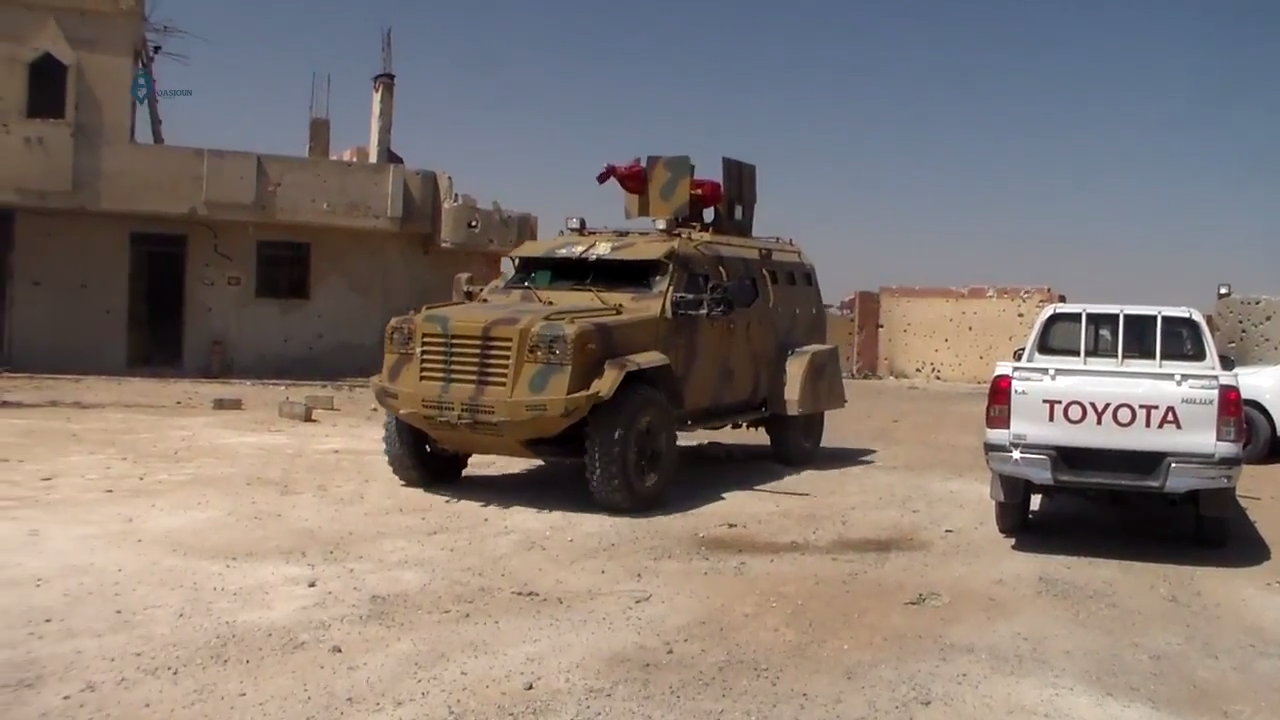
SDF MRAP and pickup truck in Raqqa, 8 June 2017

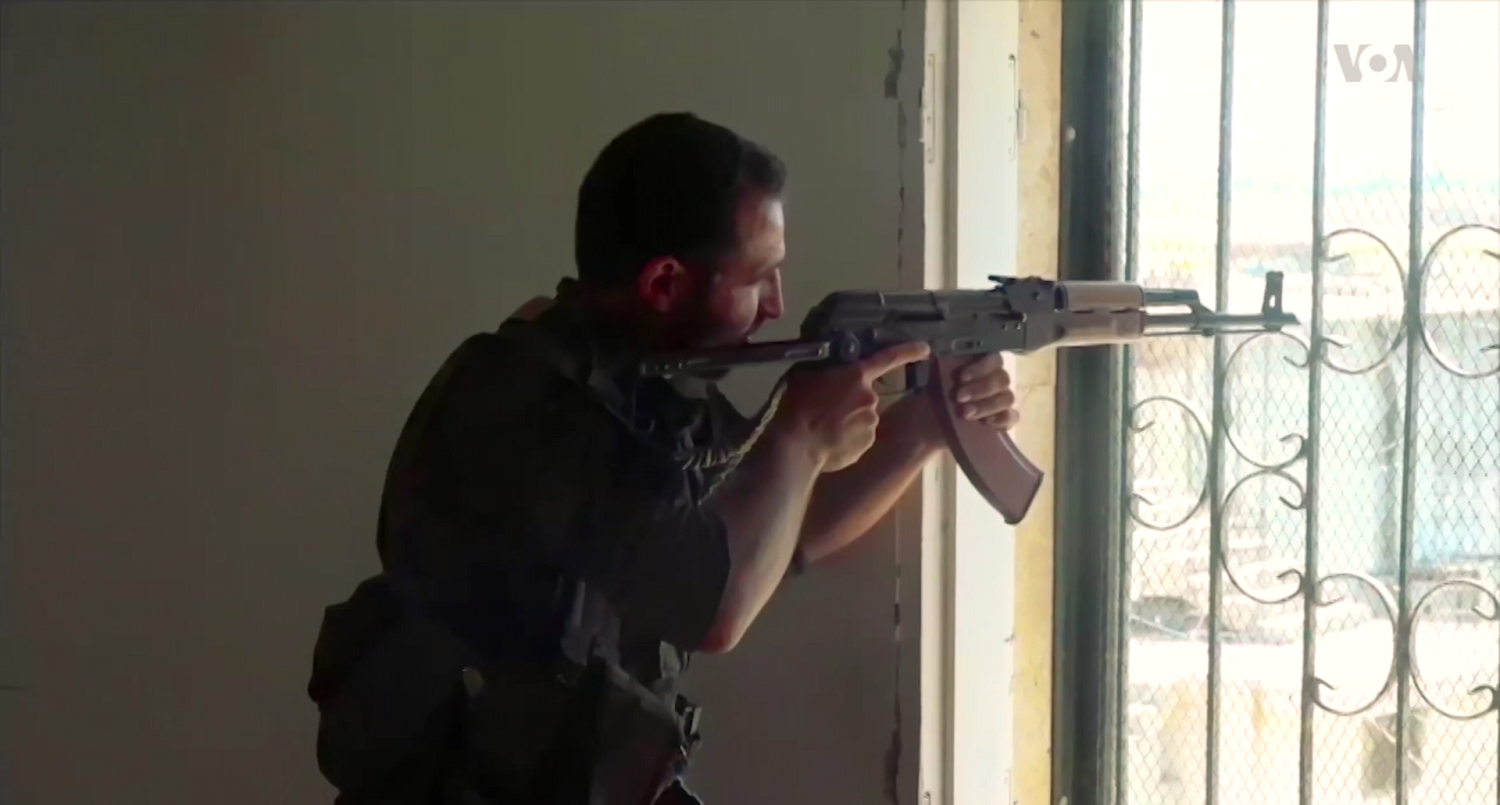
A SDF fighter in combat in Raqqa city, 8 June 2017

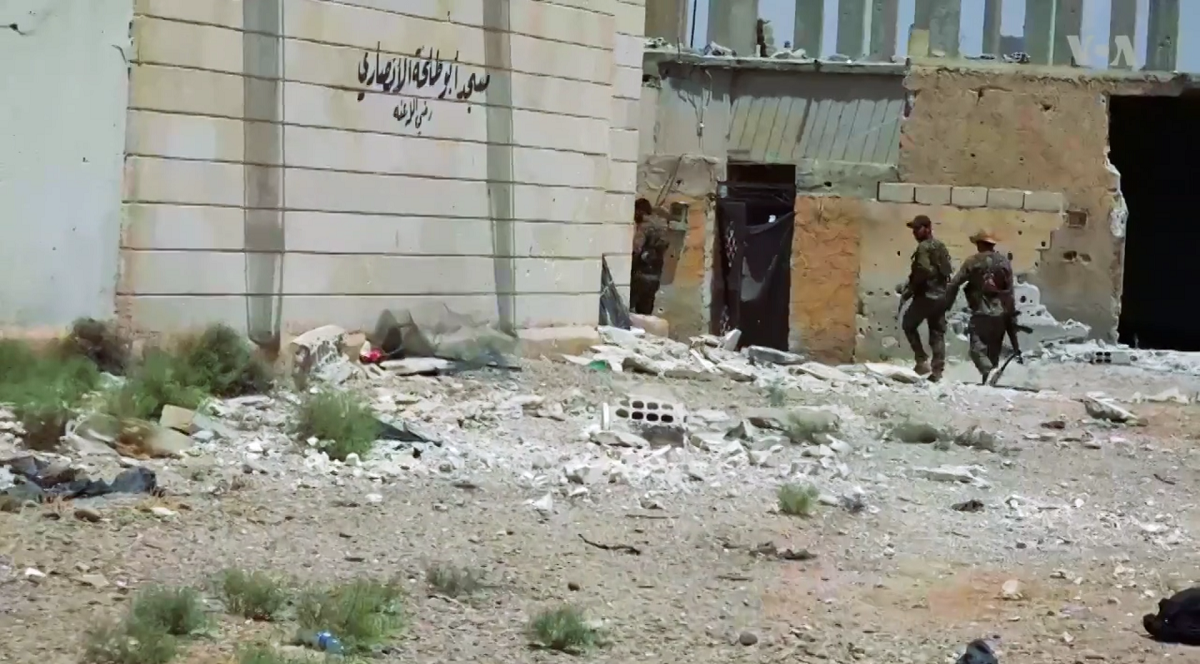
SDF fighters walk through a destroyed area in the suburbs of Raqqa, 13 June 2017

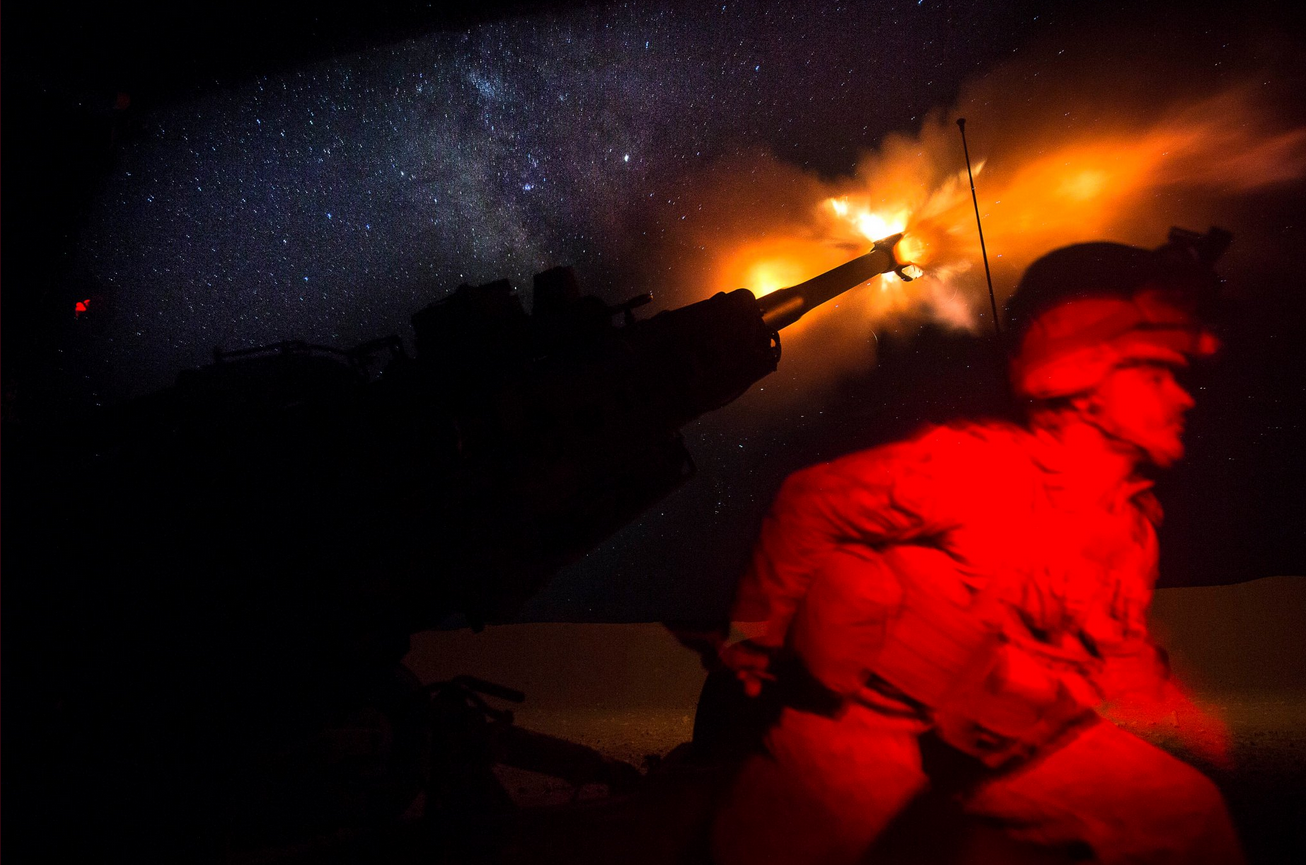
The United States Marine Corps provides fire support to the SDF, 21 July 2017

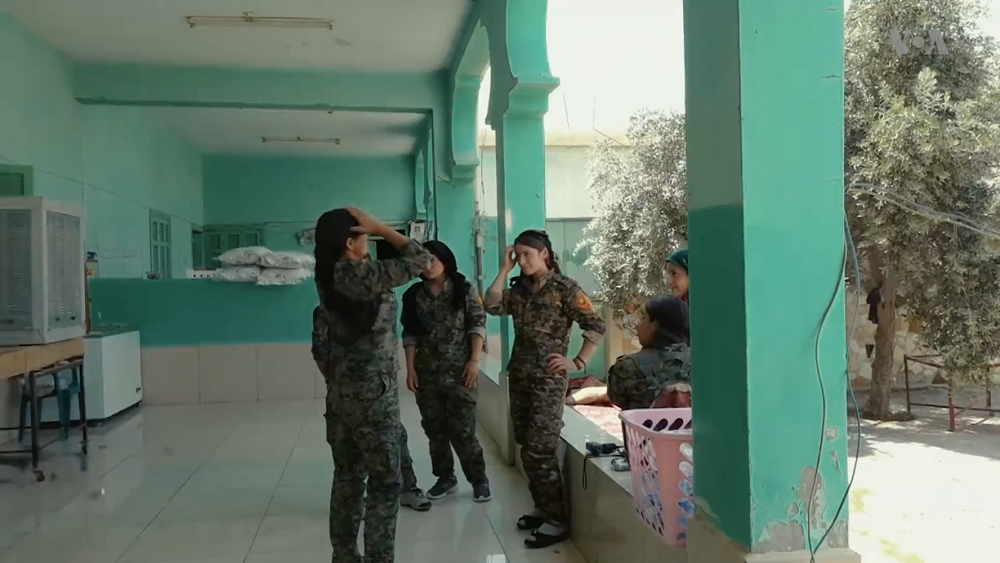
YJÊ fighters in Raqqa, 12 July

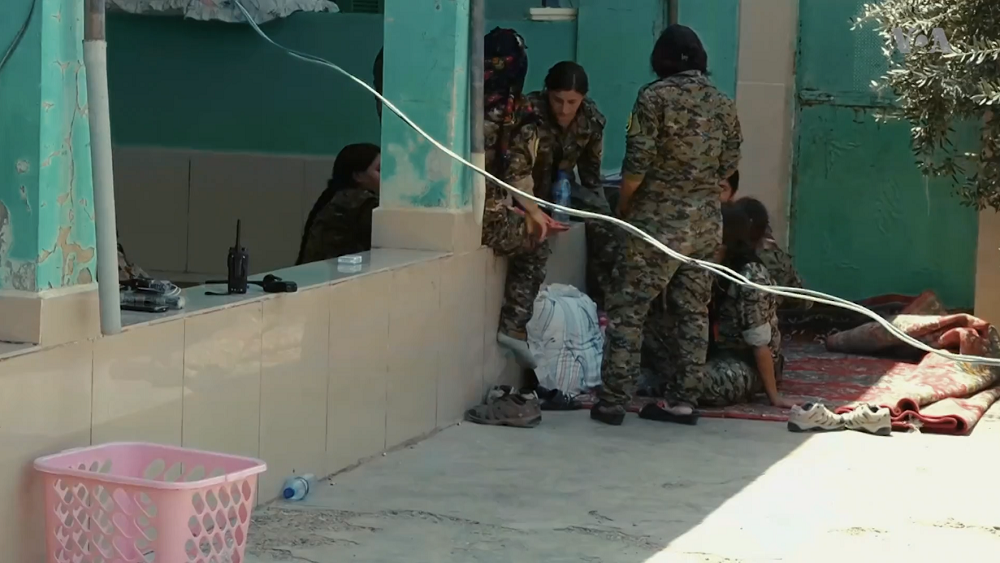
YJÊ fighters in Raqqa, 12 July

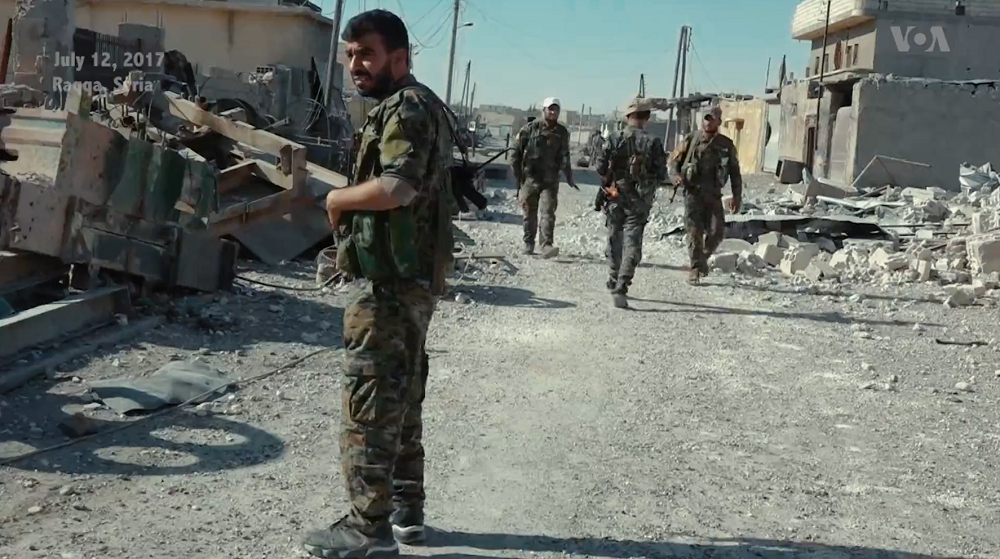
SDF fighters in Raqqa's downtown, 12 July

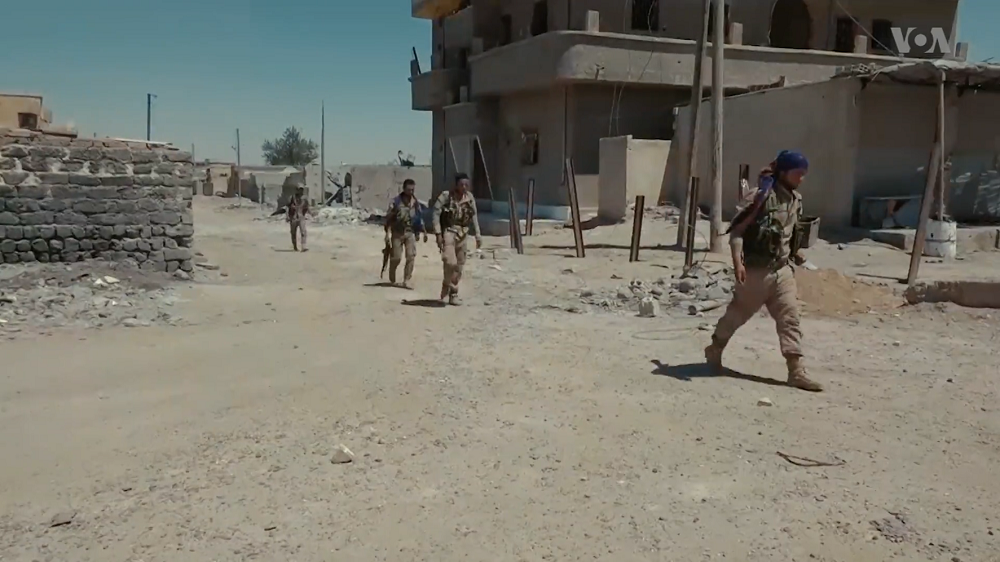
SDF fighters in Raqqa, 12 July

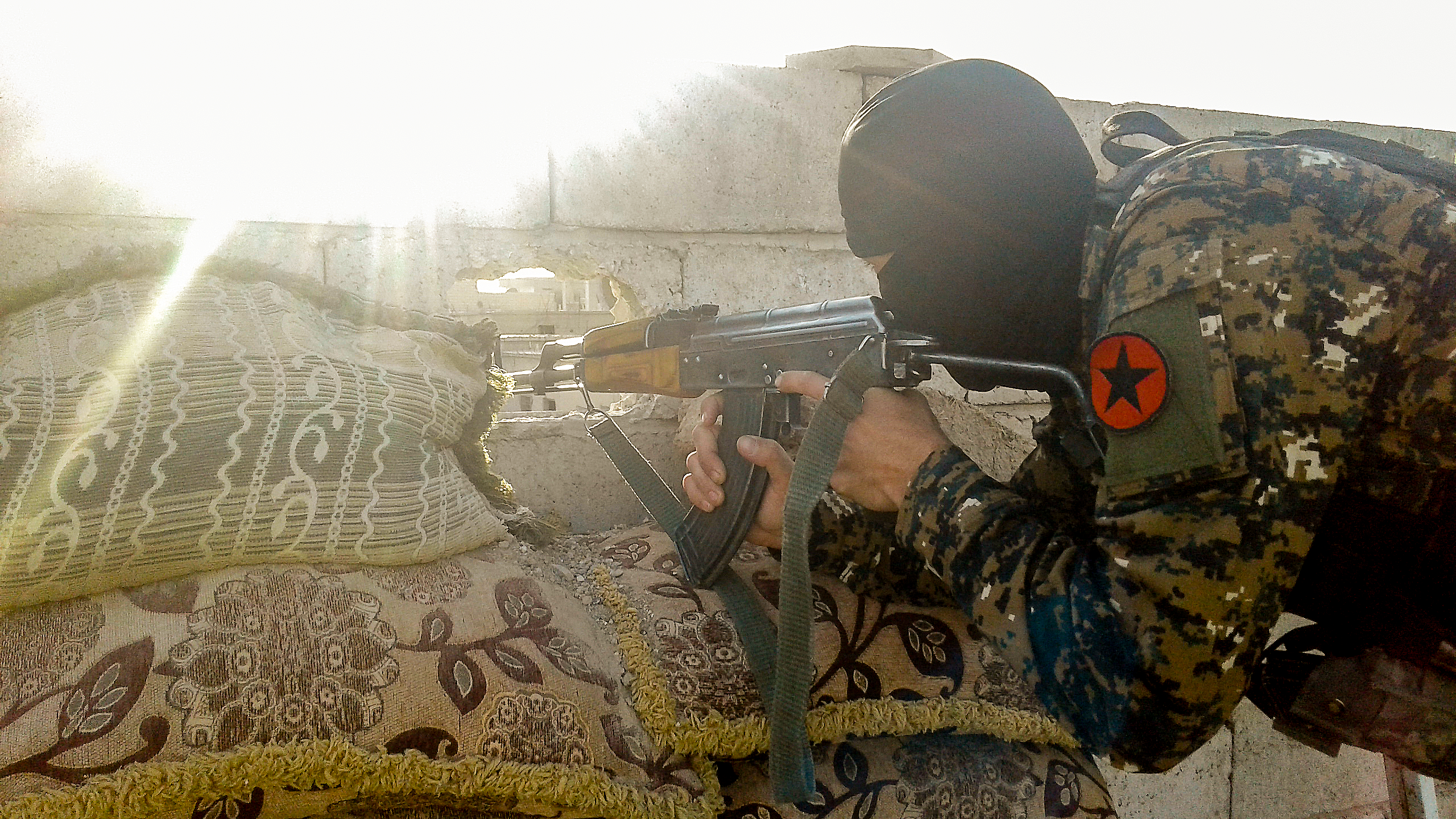
An anarchist fighter from IRPGF in the suburbs of Raqqa, 21 July 2017

== See also ==
- Al-Thawrah District, a district of Raqqa Governorate in which the Second, Third, and Fourth Phases of this campaign have taken place.
- Cities and towns during the Syrian Civil War
- Turkish military intervention in Syria
- Battle of Aleppo (2012–2016)
- Raqqa campaign (2012–2013)
- Battle of Raqqa (March 2013)
- 2014 Eastern Syria offensive
- Siege of Deir ez-Zor (2014–2017)
- Siege of Kobanî
- Tell Abyad offensive
- Tishrin Dam offensive
- Al-Shaddadi offensive (2016)
- Manbij offensive (2016)
- Battle of Sirte (2016)
- Syrian Desert campaign (December 2016 – April 2017)
- Battle of Marawi
- Deir ez-Zor campaign (2017–2019)
- Battle of Baghuz Fawqani

== Bibliography ==
- Harp, Seth (23 February 2017). "The Anarchists vs. ISIS". Rolling Stone. New York City: Wenner Media LLC. pp. 42–49.
- Tabler, Andrew J. (2017). "Eyeing Raqqa: A tale of four tribes" (PDF). Policy Notes (38). Washington, D.C.: The Washington Institute for Near East Policy. Archived from the original (PDF) on 2017-03-25.
