= YPG–FSA relations =

Relations between the Free Syrian Army and the YPG

Relations between the People's Protection Units (YPG) and the Free Syrian Army (FSA) are unclear and varied among the different FSA factions. Both are opposed to the Islamic State of Iraq and the Levant. However, several clashes between the two have taken place. Under pressure from the United States (who has assisted both), some FSA groups coordinate with the YPG to battle ISIL under the name of the Syrian Democratic Forces, although some other FSA groups remained in conflict with the YPG and the SDF, including FSA groups in the SDF. After the fall of the Assad regime, most FSA factions were incorporated into the newly formed Syrian Ministry of Defense, with only a few FSA factions remaining within the SDF.

== Timeline ==
=== 2012–13 ===
==== Early clashes ====
The earliest incident of YPG–FSA fighting happened between 29 June and 2 July 2012. FSA groups and the PYD clashed in the town of Afrin, during which two rebel fighters and one ex-PYD member were killed.

On 25 October, some 200 rebels moved into the district of Ashrafiyeh in the YPG-controlled area of Sheikh Maqsud of Aleppo city. It was the first time that government or rebel forces moved in a substantial way into the Kurdish areas. Previously the area had been regarded as neutral with Kurdish militia clashing with both rebel and army units. The rebel unit responsible is allegedly the Liwa al-Tawhid brigade who reportedly told the locals "We are here to spend Eid with you." Ashrafiyeh is important as a part of the city heights and controls routes between the north and south of Aleppo. Previous rebel attempts to move into the district had been repelled.

The situation in Afrin district as of 22 June 2013

Rebel activists have claimed that Kurdish forces had either reached agreement with rebels to allow their rapid advance or assisted the rebels by simply leaving their checkpoints overnight. One rebel spokesman has even gone as far as to indicate that Kurdish forces may join the Free Syrian Army.

On 26 October, rebels clashed with Kurdish militias that tried to stop them entering the Sheikh Maqsud neighbourhood. 19 rebels and 3–5 Kurdish fighters were killed. One Kurdish leader said that they had "a gentlemen's agreement" with the rebels that they would not enter Kurdish areas and that the rebels had violated it when they entered Ashrafiyeh. According to another report, by activists who organised a Kurdish protest at a PYD militant checkpoint between the Kurdish areas of Ashrafiyeh and al-Sheikh Maqsoud, rebel fighters opened fire on the protesters, leaving eight dead and five wounded. The Kurds warned that this may lead to clashes between Arab and Kurdish fighters in the area. Overall, the PYD stated that 10 Kurds were killed during the clashes, including the three fighters. SOHR put the Kurdish toll at 11, for a total of 30 dead, when including the 19 rebels. 200 people were kidnapped or captured as a result of the fighting. The PYD captured 20 rebel fighters, while the rebels detained 180 Kurds, civilians and fighters, 120 of them near the town of Hayyan. SOHR said that the PYD was still in control of the Ashrafiyeh neighbourhood. A PYD statement published after the fighting blamed both the Syrian army and the FSA for the violence. "We have chosen to remain neutral, and we will not take sides in a war that will only bring suffering and destruction to our country," the statement said. The rebels said that the clashes started after their forces attacked a security compound in Ashrafieh, which was defended by both PKK fighters and government troops.

On 28 October, near the Kurdish village of Yazi Bah, close to the Turkish border in the Aleppo countryside, rebel forces reportedly tried to storm the town of Qastal Jindo (al-Kastal). During the fighting that followed between the PYD and the rebels, 4–5 rebel fighters were killed. Among the dead was also Abou Ibrahim, the leader of the rebel Northern Storm Brigade. He previously claimed responsibility for the kidnapping of 11 Lebanese Shiite pilgrims. The next day, SOHR reported that a Kurd, taken prisoner by the rebels near Hayan, was tortured to death.

On 30 October, the third consecutive day of clashes at al-Kastal, the town was shelled with mortars from the rebel stronghold of Azaz. Sporadic gunfire also occurred near the village. Meanwhile, in a new round of clashes in the Kurdish areas of Aleppo city, rebels opened fire on Kurdish protesters killing three of them. The day after, PYD fighters ambushed rebels near the rebel-held Turkish border crossing of Bab al-Salameh, killing one fighter and wounding two. On 2 November, the rebels reportedly executed Shaha Ali Abdu, a Kurdish PYD militia leader, who they previously captured in Aleppo city while she was on a mission to return the bodies of rebel fighters that were killed during the clashes between the FSA and the Kurdish militia. Reports of Shaha Ali Abdu's execution were later found to be untrue as she turned up unharmed in the town of Afrin 9 days later. The next day, a government airstrike on Ras al Ain killed 7 rebels.

==== YPG and FSA truce signed ====
On 5 November, both YPG and FSA signed a truce, promising release of detainees and closer cooperation in fight against the Assad government.

==== Battle of Ras al-Ayn ====
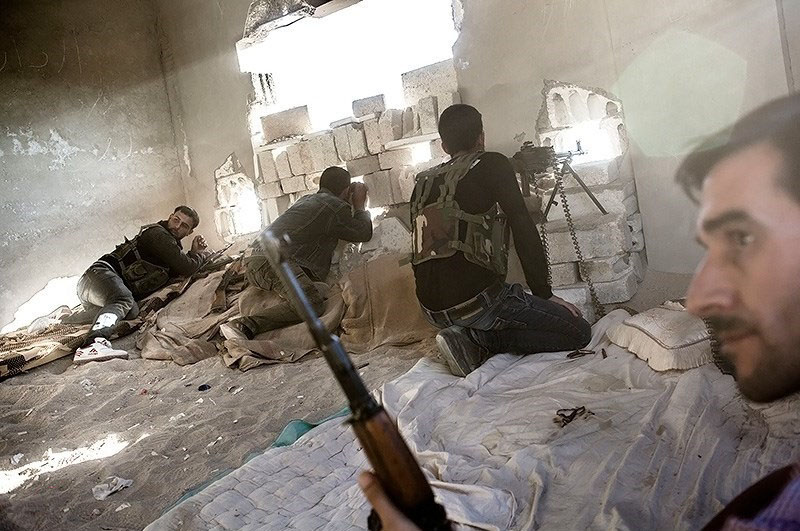
YPG fighters in Ras al-Ayn fighting al-Nusra Front

On 8 November 2012, the FSA attacked Syrian army positions in town of Ras al-Ayn (Kurdish: Serêkanî) and later released video showed FSA fighters in control of the town. Al-Kurdiya News correspondent on the ground also said that local Kurds aided the FSA in the attack. According to Turkish journalist Mehmet Aksakal two Turks have been injured in the border town of Ceylanpınar. He also suggested that clashes may be result of growing dissatisfaction between KNC (ENKS) and PYD. However, another Kurdish activist claimed that even though PYD had their armed wing in the city, it was controlled fully by the government and PYD did not participate in clashes. Around 10 rebels and 20 Syrian soldiers were killed in the fighting, while about 8000 residents fled to Ceylanpınar as fighting raged.

On 10 November, YPG militiamen aided by local Kurds stormed the last government security and administrative stations in the towns of Al-Darbasiyah (Kurdish: Dirbêsî) and Tel Tamer. This attack was prompted by violence in Ras al-Ain where the FSA stormed the town because of the presence of government security units. It also left only 2 major towns in hands of government in Al-Hasakah Governorate – Al-Hasakah and Qamishli. The following day, an airstrike conducted on Ras al-Ayn by the Syrian Air Force killed at least 16 individuals in the town.

On 13 November, YPG militia forced out remaining security units from the town of Al-Malikiyah (Kurdish: Dêrika Hemko), in order to prevent FSA from having an excuse to launch an attack like in Ras al-Ayn. On 14 November, FSA fighters took control of an army post near Ras Al Ain, reportedly killing 18 soldiers based there. On 15 November, FSA announced that they had taken full control of Ras Al Ain capturing or killing the last remaining Syrian Army soldiers stationed there. There were also no government airstrikes in the town for the first time in the past 3 days as Government forces appeared to have given up in trying to retake the city.

On 19 November, the FSA launched an assault on a PYD checkpoint in Ras al-Ayn that initially left six rebels dead. The rebels also assassinated Abed Khalil, the president of the local Kurdish PYD council, when a sniper shot him dead. The next day it was reported by SOHR that the death toll in the rebel-PYD fighting in the town had reached 34. 29 of the dead were members of the rebel Islamist Al-Nusra Front and the Gharba al-Sham battalion. The other five included four Kurdish fighters and the Kurdish official. The four Kurdish fighters were reportedly executed after being captured by the rebels. The opposition activist group the LCC put the number of dead at 46: 25 Kurdish and 20 FSA fighters and the official. 35 Kurds and 11 FSA fighters were captured by both sides.

As a result of the fighting, there has been a buildup in the number of forces deployed by both sides in Ras al-Ayn. By 22 November, Kurdish forces had strengthened their numbers to around 400 militiamen, who faced 200 fighters from the Al-Nusra Front and 100 fighters from Ghuraba al-Sham, supported by three captured Syrian Army tanks.

On 19 November, members of the al-Nusra Front and Ghuraba al-Sham opened fire on a YPG checkpoint, sparking clashes that killed dozens of people, including at three rebel leaders. A Kurdish activist stated that the presence of hostile Islamist fighters had alienated Kurdish locals. Both the Kurdish National Council and top FSA commander General Riad al-Asaad condemned the clashes, with the KNC calling the presence of rebel fighters in the town "pointless and unjustifiable", and al-Asaad attributing the violence to "some groups trying to exploit the situation in order to blow up relations between Kurds and Arabs" while expressly denying any FSA affiliation with Ghuraba al-Sham.

On 22 November, SOHR reported that eight members of the al-Nusra Front and one PYD fighter were killed in fighting for Ras al-Ayn. The fighting had claimed an estimated 54 lives to date. The next day, however, a tenuous two-day ceasefire was announced between Kurdish fighters and Islamist militants of the al-Nusra Front and Ghuraba a- Sham in order to determine terms of a possible permanent agreement between the two sides. Prior to this announcement, the PYD claimed that its forces had killed 25 rebels, wounded 20 more, and destroyed three vehicles.

On 3 December, air raids conducted by the Syrian Air Force on a police station and old post office in the Mahatta neighbourhood killed twelve and injured dozens more. Among the dead were six Kurds, three of them children. Ambulances from Turkey took at least 21 of the wounded to a hospital in the predominantly Kurdish town of Ceylanpınar across the border. Turkey scrambled a number of F-16 fighter jets based at Diyarbakir in response to the strikes.

On 22 January 2013, at least 56 people were killed in a week of fighting in northeast Syria between anti-government rebels as hostilities re-opened in Ras al-Ayn.

On 17 February, an agreement was reached between the Kurdish Supreme Committee and FSA groups in Ras al-Ayn. The terms of agreement include the withdrawal of all foreign fighters from Ras al-Ayn, joint checkpoints between the YPG and the FSA, the establishment of a joint city council in Ras al-Ayn, the creation of a local police force, and cooperation between the two groups to fight the Syrian government.

==== Battle of Tal Tamr ====
On 14 February 2013, FSA-affiliated fighters tried unsuccessfully to storm a cattle farm in Tal Tamr, sparking a firefight with YPG units in which several of the attackers were killed.

=== 2014–16 ===
==== Siege of Kobanî (September 2014 – March 2015) ====
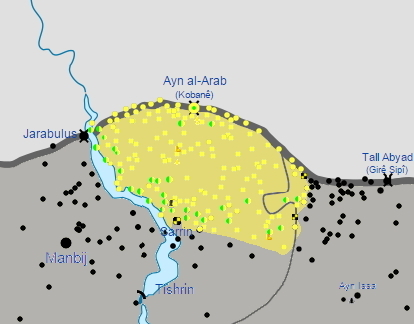
Kobanî Canton after breaking the siege in April 2015; some towns at the outskirts are jointly controlled by FSA and YPG Controlled by the People's Protection Units Controlled by the Syrian opposition Controlled by Islamic State of Iraq and the Levant

In September 2014, the Islamic State of Iraq and the Levant launched the Siege of Kobanî and entered the city by October. This partly contributed to the beginning of the American-led intervention in Syria, which launched airstrikes and airdropped supplies and weapons to the YPG in Kobanî, some of which have been captured by ISIL. The FSA was divided in its position on the YPG, with one of the FSA commanders, Malik al-Kurdi, a former Syrian Navy colonel, describing the US support for the YPG as "disgusting". However, the FSA groups Northern Sun Battalion, Liwa Thuwwar al-Raqqa, and Jabhat al-Akrad cooperated with the YPG and formed the Euphrates Volcano joint operations room in fighting ISIL and lost 70 fighters in the fighting. After ISIL was expelled from the city in late January 2015 the FSA's Dawn of Freedom Brigades jointly raised their flag along with the YPG and YPJ above the hills of Kobanî.

==== Tell Abyad offensive (May–July 2015) ====
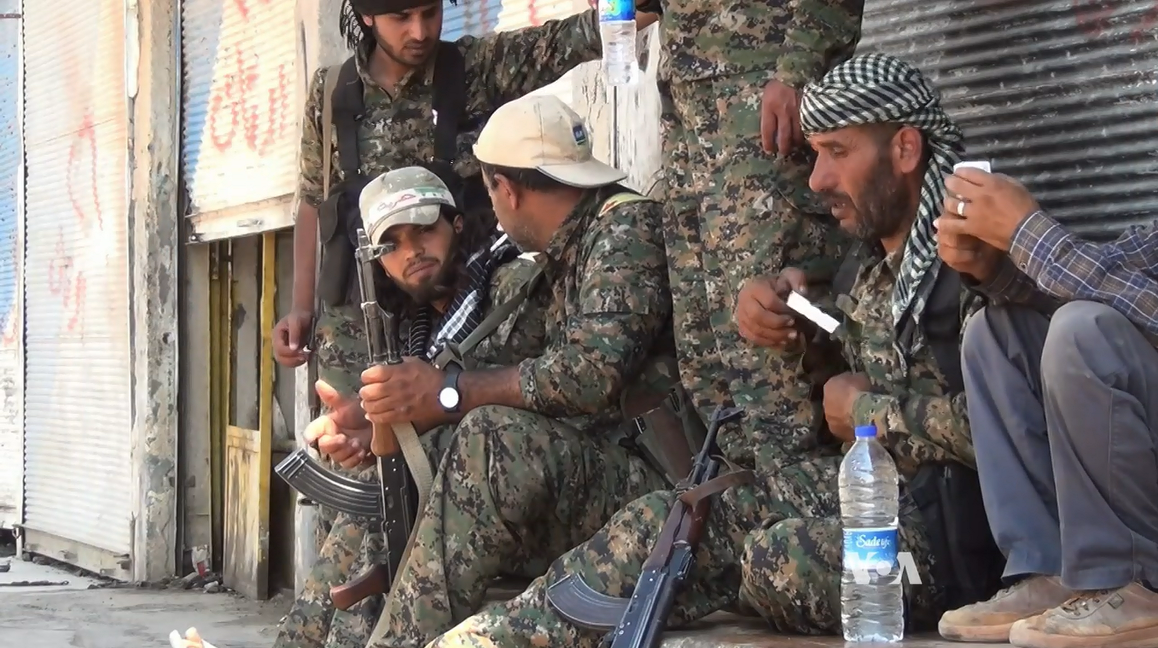
YPG and FSA fighters in Tell Abyad, June 2015

The YPG launched an offensive in May–July 2015 to capture Tell Abyad and to link up Kobanî Canton and the Jazira Canton. Under Euphrates Volcano, two FSA groups, the Raqqa Revolutionaries Brigade and the Liberation Brigade, took part in the offensive.

==== Syrian Democratic Forces (October 2015 – present) ====
On 10 October 2015, components of the Euphrates Volcano established the Syrian Democratic Forces. The founding groups are the YPG, the YPJ, al-Sanadid Forces, the Syriac Military Council, Liwa Thuwar al-Raqqa, al-Jazeera Brigades, and the recently formed Army of Revolutionaries, which includes the Northern Sun Battalion, Jabhat al-Akrad, Seljuk Brigade, al-Tehrîr Brigade, and the 99th Brigade.

Some more FSA units would join the SDF later. These included the Free Jarabulus Battalion and the Euphrates Martyrs Battalion, a former member of al-Tawhid Brigade, and the Martyrs of Dam Brigade in January 2016, and the Soldiers of the Two Holy Mosques Brigade, a former member of the 19th Division of the Army of Mujahedeen in March 2016. Most of these groups joined the Northern Sun Battalion.

Since then, the SDF launched the 2015 Al-Hawl offensive in October–November, the Tishrin Dam offensive in December, and the Al-Shaddadi offensive (2016) in February.

==== Clashes with other FSA groups in Aleppo (November 2015 – November 2016) ====
Advances made by the Syrian Army and the Syrian Democratic Forces in north Aleppo, February 2016

The YPG-controlled neighborhood of Sheikh Maqsood in Aleppo have been under constant siege by both Syrian government forces and the rebels for more than a year. In September 2015 the Army of Victory accused the YPG of having a border crossing with the regime, while the YPG accused the Victory Army of shelling the neighborhood. The conflict between Fatah Halab and the SDF in Aleppo escalated in November as Ahrar ash-Sham, Liwa Ahrar Souriya, and the Mountain Hawks Brigade battled the YPG and the FSA-SDF group Army of Revolutionaries for control of the village of Maryamin.

In late November 2015, there were clashes between the Army of Revolutionaries, supported by the YPG, and the FSA-dominated Mare' Operations Room in the northern Aleppo Governorate, backed by Ahrar ash-Sham and the al-Nusra Front. However, both the YPG and al-Nusra denied involvement in the conflict.

In December the government of the Afrin Canton declared a state of emergency due to threats of attacks from Ahrar ash-Sham and al-Nusra Front and increased cooperation with Jaysh al-Thuwar. On 3 December 2015, a truce was signed between the YPG and the Mare' Operations Room in Aleppo, although the Army of Revolutionaries refused to recognize the treaty and announced that they will continue to fight the rebels. However, another agreement was signed between the Mare' Operations Room and Jaysh al-Thuwar on 19 December 2015, which permitted Jaysh al-Thuwar to join the operations room.

Clashes between the SDF and the rebels erupted again in February 2016 when the YPG and the Army of Revolutionaries followed the offensives of the Syrian Armed Forces, backed by Russian air strikes. The SDF then captured the villages of al-Ziyara and Khuraybika from Islamist rebels, reportedly with the support of the locals. The YPG and YPJ later seized the Menagh Military Airbase.

The next day, Turkey retaliated by shelling the air base and other Kurdish forces in Afrin. The United States subsequently condemned both the shelling and the advances made by the YPG, although both groups continued their attacks.

Since then, the 13th Division of the FSA have joined the fight against the SDF in Kaljibrin, Azaz District, who they all label as "PKK".

In March 2016 the Turkish-backed and US-armed Kurdish FSA group Grandsons of Saladin, supported by Turkish shelling, captured several villages between Jarabulus and Azaz from ISIL and threatened to attack the YPG, accusing them of working with the regime. The US and the Kurdish National Council denied that they supplied the group.

Since 6 March, Fatah Halab, including the Syrian Turkmen Brigades, Harakat Nour al-Din al-Zenki, the Levant Front, and Fastaqim Kama Umirt have intensified shellings and other attacks against civilians and militants alike in Sheikh Maqsoud, using weapons such as hell cannons and rockets containing yellow phosphorus as chemical weapons. As of 10 March 2016, 16 civilians and 4 Asayish forces have been killed from the attacks. As of early April the civilian casualties caused by the shellings increased to 70, most of which are women and children.

On 7 April, another chemical attack was reported in Sheikh Maqsoud, injuring 2 YPG fighters and two others. Jaysh al-Islam, one of the groups involved in the attack, confirmed the use of unconventional weapons, although it did not specify the type.

On 29 March, the Mountain Hawks Brigade destroyed a YPG T-72 near Azaz using a US-made BGM-71 TOW.

On 28 May, the SDF took over the town of Sheikh Issa to prevent an ISIL takeover and negotiated an agreement in Mare'. The SDF created a humanitarian corridor for wounded rebels and displaced civilians from the town to Afrin.

On 18 October 2016, the Northern Thunder Brigade issued an ultimatum to the YPG and the Army of Revolutionaries, warning them to leave Tell Rifaat within 48 hours after which they will attack the town, though the threat was never acted on

=== Turkish intervention (August 2016 – 2025) ===
==== Operation Euphrates Shield ====
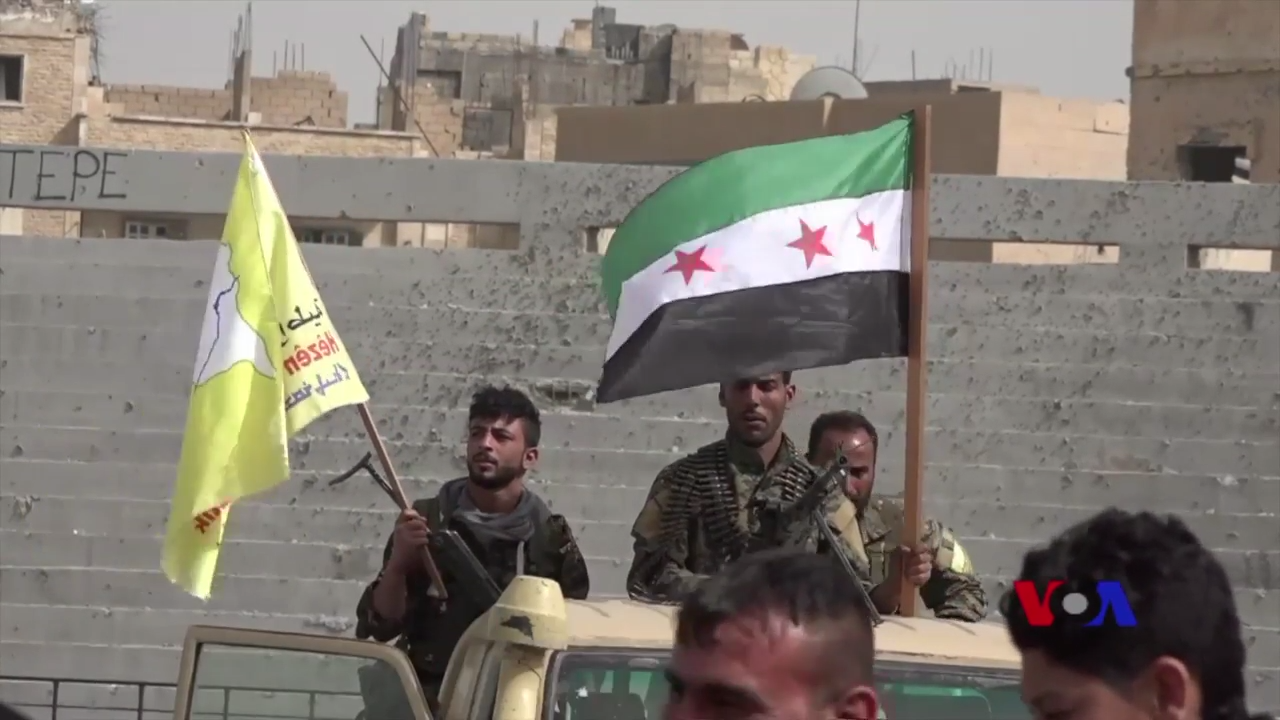
FSA fighters in the SDF in Raqqa, 6 March 2018.

On 24 August Turkey and pro-Turkish FSA forces launched Operation Euphrates Shield, a large-scale military operation against ISIL in and near the border city of Jarabulus, obstructing the SDF's Manbij offensive further south. The next day Turkish and allied FSA forces attacked the SDF and eventually forced them south across the Sajur River several days later.

On 28 August 2016, 10 FSA groups in the SDF released a statement condemning Turkish airstrikes on villages north of Manbij that killed more than 20 civilians. The groups declared their support for the SDF's Jarabulus Military Council against Turkey and are as follows:

- Army of Revolutionaries
  - Kurdish Front
    - Tell Rifaat Revolutionaries Battalions
  - Seljuk Brigade
  - Northern Democratic Brigade
  - Tribal Forces of Aleppo Countryside
  - 99th Infantry Brigade
  - Homs Commandos Brigade
  - Special Tasks Brigade
  - Hamza Brigade

==== Afrin ====
In January 2018, Turkey commenced military operations against the SDF and the YPG in the Afrin region of Syria. The Turkish force was comprised partly of pro-Turkish FSA units. Turkey claimed that the operation is also directed against ISIL, though this is disputed by both the SDF and the YPG. According to Rami Abdulrahman, who heads the Syrian Observatory of Human Rights, Turkey has begun a military alliance with the ex-militants of IS and Al Qaeda and incorporated many of them into the FSA. There appeared to be footage where FSA fighters threatened the Kurdish population in Afrin with beheading if they do not comply with their demands and accept a fundamental Islam as their religion.

==== Operation Dawn of Freedom ====
During the Syrian opposition offensives in 2024, Turkish-backed factions launched an offensive against the YPG-led SDF, capturing Tel Rifaat and Manbij.

The Turkish-backed Free Syrian Army (known as Syrian National Army) disbanded in 2025, and incorporated into the new Syrian army.

== FSA groups affiliation ==
Rebel groups in the Supreme Military Council of the Syrian Revolutionary Command Council tend to be in direct conflict with YPG. Some former FSA groups however merged into Euphrates Volcano, joining the Syrian Democratic Forces.

=== FSA groups allied with the YPG ===
- Army of Revolutionaries
  - Jabhat al-Akrad
- Northern Sun Battalion
- Northern Democratic Brigade
- Jabhat Thuwar al-Raqqa, including its sub-groups
- Raqqa Hawks Brigade
- Liberation Brigade
- Syrian Elite Forces
- Free Raqqa Brigade
- Euphrates Liberation Brigade
- Manbij Turkmen Battalion
- Manbij Revolutionaries Battalion
- Euphrates Jarabulus Battalions, including its sub-groups
- Jarabulus Company (defunct)
- Revolutionaries of Tal Abyad Front

=== FSA groups fighting the YPG ===
- Syrian National Army
  - Sultan Murad Division
  - Free Idlib Army
    - Mountain Hawks Brigade
    - Northern Division
    - 13th Division
  - 23rd Division
  - Levant Front
  - Hamza Division
  - Elite Army
  - Army of Victory
  - Ahrar al-Sharqiya

== See also ==
- Rojava conflict
- Turkish military intervention in Afrin
