= Tishrin Dam offensive =

2015 military operation during the Syrian Civil War

Coordinates: 36.3814°N 38.1786°E

- Part of the Syrian Civil War and the American-led intervention in Syria
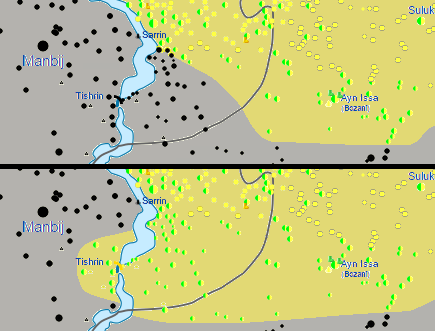
- Map of the territorial changes from 23–30 December 2015
Date	23–30 December 2015 (1 week)
Location	Northeastern Aleppo Governorate, Syria
Result	Major SDF victory
Territorial changes	The SDF captures Tishrin Dam and Tishrin town; The SDF captures over 100 villages and 640 square kilometres (250 mi^{2})

Belligerents
Syrian Democratic Forces; International Freedom Battalion Air support: CJTF–OIR	Islamic State

Commanders and leaders
Abu Issa (Liwa Thuwar al-Raqqa leader); Adnan Abu Amjad (Northern Sun Battalion deputy commander)	Unknown

Units involved
Syrian Democratic Forces; YPG; YPJ; Army of Revolutionaries; Northern Sun Battalion; Jabhat al-Akrad; Liwa Thuwar al-Raqqa; Syriac Military Council; Euphrates Jarabulus Brigades; Al-Tahrir Brigade; Brigade Groups of al-Jazira; Al-Sanadid Forces; International Freedom Battalion; MLKP; United Freedom Forces	(Islamic State) Military of ISIL: Wilayat Halab

Strength
SDF: Several thousand fighters (United States) US: ~30–70 soldiers (allegedly)	Unknown

Casualties and losses
SDF: 9 killed	319 killed

The Tishrin Dam offensive, or Southern Kobanî offensive, was a military operation in December 2015 in the northeastern Aleppo Governorate during the Syrian Civil War, conducted by the Syrian Democratic Forces (SDF) to capture the strategic Tishrin Dam and the southern countryside of the self-declared Kobanî Canton from the Islamic State of Iraq and the Levant (ISIL). The Combined Joint Task Force – Operation Inherent Resolve supported the SDF offensive with over 26 airstrikes.

== The offensive ==
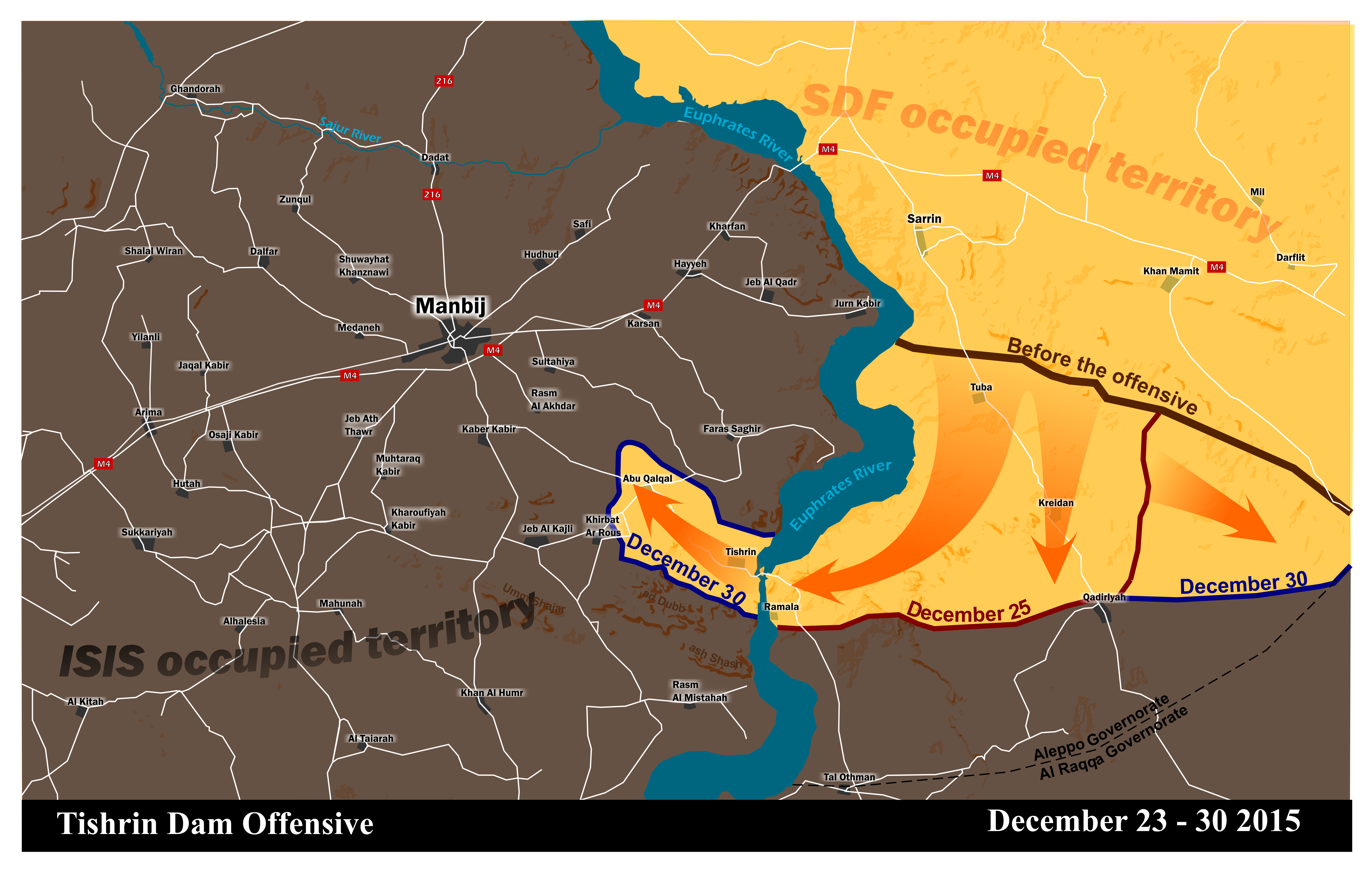
Progress of the offensive.

On 23 December, the joint command of the Syrian Democratic Forces officially launched the offensive, with the goal to "clear all areas in southern Kobanî Canton that have been occupied by elements of the terrorist group known as Daesh (ISIS)".

On 24 December, the SDF captured the villages of Sahrij, Al Jabal, Abaydad, Al Mansia, Miruha, Sajjadi, Dandoshan, Birdan and over fifteen farmlands south of the town of Sarrin, which was captured by the YPG and Free Syrian Army earlier in the same year, during the Battle of Sarrin. 14 ISIL members and 2 SDF fighters were killed during the battles.

On 25 December, the alliance of Kurdish, Arab and Assyrian militias seized the villages of Bojakh, Hafyan, Munsiye, Sofayte, Saqit, Dahr Al–Faraj and the surrounding farms from ISIL. During a nighttime raid, 12 ISIL members were killed. At that point, the SDF had managed to capture 16 km along the east bank of the Euphrates.

On 26 December, the Syrian Democratic Forces captured the Tishrin Dam and the villages of Bir Shumal, Bir Bagar, Abdilkiye, Tal Banat, Khishkhash, Al-Wesi and Miwelih. The SDF managed to kill five ISIL fighters and captured another eight alive. A total of 50 villages were seized from ISIL during the first four days of the offensive.

On 27 December, the SDF advanced on the western bank of the Euphrates. They captured the towns of Tishrin and Sakaniya. At least 15 members of ISIL were killed during the operation. On the same day ISIL executed four young men in Manbij who were accused of being members of the SDF.

On 30 December, the general command of the Syrian Democratic Forces declared the end of the operation to liberate the southern areas of the Kobanî Canton. The SDF captured over 100 villages and hamlets, the Tishrin Dam, an area of ~640 km², and killed 219 ISIL fighters, according to a balance sheet released by the SDF. An additional 100 ISIL fighters were killed by Coalition airstrikes during the offensive. Seven SDF members and two members of the police force Asayish died during the operation.

== See also ==
- November 2015 Sinjar offensive
- Battle of al-Hasakah (June–August 2015)
- Al-Hawl offensive
- Al-Shaddadi offensive (2016)
- Manbij offensive (2016)
- Battle of Tabqa (2017)
- List of wars and battles involving ISIL
