= Adnan Abu Amjad =

Syrian military commander (1977–2017)

- Arabic: عدنان أبو أمجد
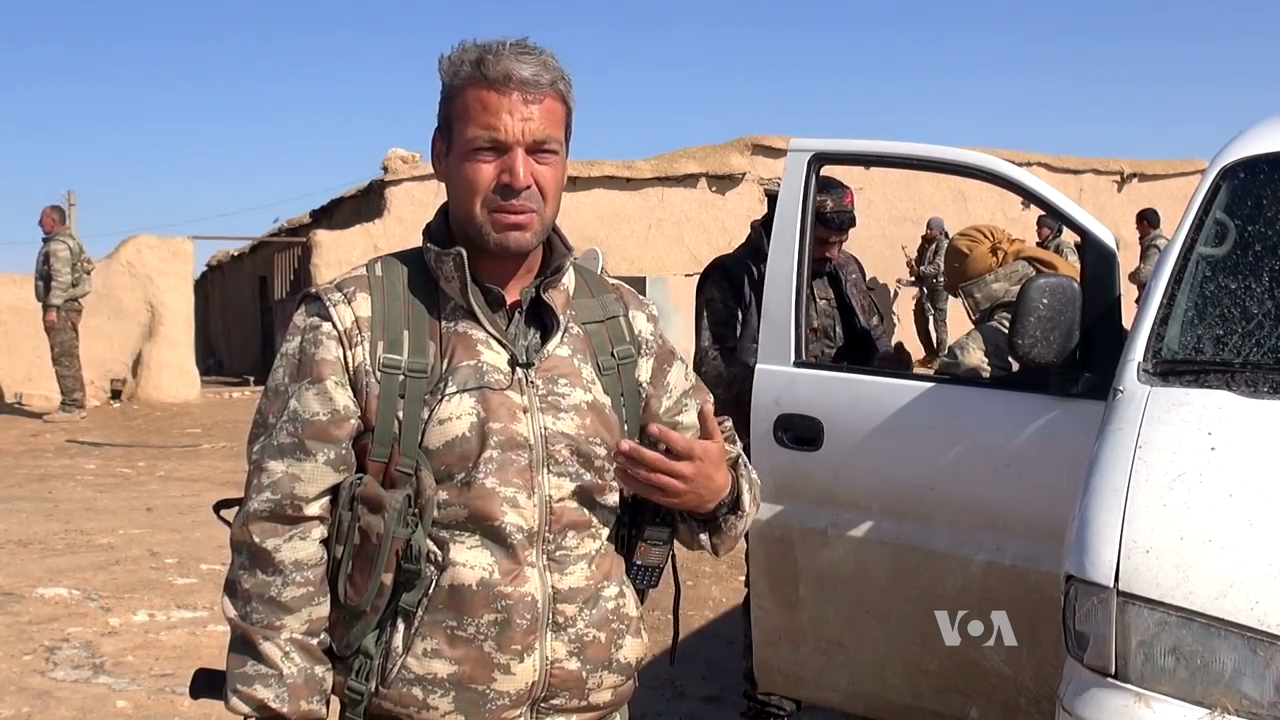
- Born: Adnan Abdul Aziz Ahmed (Arabic: عدنان عبد العزيز أحمد); 1977; Manbij, Syria
- Died: 29 August 2017 (aged 39–40); Raqqa, Syria
- Military career
- Allegiance: Syrian opposition (2012–2013); AANES (2013–2017)
- Branch: (Syrian opposition) Free Syrian Army (2012–2017): Syrian Democratic Forces (2015–2017); Manbij Military Council
- Service years: 2012–2017
- Units: Kurdish Front (2013–2014); Northern Sun Battalion (2014–2017)
- Commands: Commander-in-chief of the Manbij Military Council (2016–2017); Deputy commander of the Northern Sun Battalion (2014–2017)
- Conflicts: Syrian civil war; Battle of Aleppo; Al-Qusayr offensive; Battle of al-Qusayr (2013); Inter-rebel conflict during the Syrian Civil War; Rojava–Islamist conflict; Siege of Kobanî; Tell Abyad offensive; 2015 al-Hawl offensive; Tishrin Dam offensive; Al-Shaddadi offensive (2016); Manbij offensive (2016); Raqqa campaign (2016–2017); Battle of Tabqa (2017); Battle of Raqqa (2017) †; Operation Euphrates Shield

Adnan Abdul Aziz Ahmed (1977 – 29 August 2017), better known as Adnan Abu Amjad (Arabic: عدنان أبو أمجد), was the commander of the Manbij Military Council, active within the Syrian Democratic Forces in the Syrian Civil War. Adnan led his group, the Manbij Military Council and the Northern Sun Battalion, in every battle since its formation in 2014, including the Siege of Kobanî, the Tell Abyad offensive, the Tishrin Dam offensive, the al-Hawl offensive, the al-Shaddadi offensive, the Battle of Manbij, his hometown, where he freed his parents from ISIL rule in August 2016, and the Raqqa campaign, including the Battle of Raqqa, where he was killed in action on 29 August 2017.

== Biography ==
=== Early life ===
Adnan Abdul Aziz Ahmed was born in 1977 in the city of Manbij in northern Syria, where he attended school. Adnan worked in his brother's pharmacy for 7 years.

=== Syrian Civil War ===
==== 2012–15 ====
After the outbreak of the Syrian Civil War in 2011, Adnan Abu Amjad participated in protests against the Syrian government. In 2012, he joined a Free Syrian Army group in northern Syria. During his membership in the FSA group between 2012 and 2013, he participated in the Battle of Aleppo and the Battle of Qusayr. In July 2013, after attacks by Islamist groups, including al-Qaeda's al-Nusra Front, on Kurds in Tell Abyad, Tell Aran, and Tell Hasel, Adnan defected from the FSA group and joined the Kurdish Front.

In 2014, Adnan Abu Amjad joined the Northern Sun Battalion, whose leaders included Abu Layla. In late 2014, the Northern Sun Battalion withdrew from its headquarters in Manbij after the Islamic State of Iraq and the Levant took control of the city. While Abu Layla withdrew to Kobanî, Adnan headed to Afrin. In September 2014, Adnan was deployed to Kobanî to defend the city against an ISIL siege. After the recapture of Kobanî, Adnan fought in Tell Abyad and Ayn Issa in mid-2015.

==== 2015–17 ====
On 10 October 2015, Adnan Abu Amjad as the deputy commander of the Northern Sun Battalion became one of the founding members of the Syrian Democratic Forces. Under the SDF, he took part in offensives in al-Hawl, Tishrin Dam, and al-Shaddadi.

On 2 April 2016, Adnan announced the formation of the Manbij Military Council in Tishrin Dam, with himself as the general commander of the council. On 31 May, the council and allied SDF groups launched the Manbij offensive to capture the city from ISIL. On 2 August, Adnan Abu Amjad freed his parents in the city after almost 2 years. By 12 August, the SDF captured Manbij and the Manbij Military Council took over its security on 15 August. The offensive extended Westward toward Al-Bab in order to connect to Afrin but was stopped due to the Turkish/Rebels offensive on Al-Bab, the push northward by SAA, and the lack of support from the US.

Since late 2016, Adnan Abu Amjad led the Manbij Military Council in the SDF's Raqqa campaign against the Islamic State. The Battle of Raqqa city began on 6 June 2017. On 29 August 2017, Adnan Abu Amjad was killed in action during the battle, during which over half of the city was captured by the SDF. His funeral was held in Manbij 2 days later.

=== Personal life ===
Adnan Abu Amjad was married and had 2 children.
