= Jabhat Ghuraba al-Sham =

Syrian rebel group

Ghuraba al-Sham Front
- جبهة غرباء الشام; Strangers of the Levant Front
- Leaders: Sheikh Omar; Hasan Jazra (executed); Nizar al-Khatib ("Abu Laith"); Hasan al-Banawi ("Abu Juma")
- Dates active: 2011– November 2013 (defunct)
- Headquarters: Aleppo
- Active regions: Aleppo Governorate
- Size: 2,000 (until May 2013) ~100 (since May 2013)
- Part of: Free Syrian Army: Conquest Brigade
- Wars: Syrian civil war

The Ghuraba al-Sham Front (Arabic: جبهة غرباء الشام Jabhat Ghurabā' ash-Shām, "Strangers/Foreigners of the Levant") was a group of fighters, active during the Syrian civil war, in favor of a secular state. The group formerly had around 2,000 men, but in May 2013 it clashed with Islamic fundamentalist groups and most of its fighters dispersed. Ghuraba al-Sham's arsenals were confiscated by the Islamists and by late 2013 it had only has around 100 fighters in its ranks. The group consisted of a mixture of secularists and Islamists. The name of the group has since changed. There was a battalion within the group called the Loyalty Battalion made up entirely of women.

In November 2013, Hasan Jazra, the commander of Ghuraba al-Sham, was publicly executed by members of the Islamic State of Iraq and the Levant in the town of Atarib. Islamist groups had accused Ghuraba of looting and collaborating at times with the Syrian government.

One of the group commanders, Nizar al-Khatib, also known by his nom de guerre "Abu Laith", formed the Descendants of Messengers Brigade after the dissolution of Ghuraba al-Sham, and continued to fight ISIL. In January and February 2014, the Descendants of Messengers Brigade forged an alliance with the Kurdish Front amid battles against ISIL in northern Aleppo, and in March 2014, it changed its name to the Dawn of Freedom Brigades.

In April 2016 the German police arrested an unnamed 41 year-old Syrian man accused of crimes against international law, including torture and looting, committed while he was a leader of the group in 2012/2013.

== See also ==
- List of armed groups in the Syrian Civil War
- Ghuraba al-Sham (jihadist group)
