= Manbij Military Council =

Syrian rebel coalition

- مجلس منبج العسكري
- Flag of the Manbij Military Council
- Top commander: Adnan Abdul Aziz Ahmed † ("Adnan Abu Amjad", 2016–17); Muhammad Mustafa Ali ("Abu Adel", since 2017)
- Spokesperson: Shervan Derwish
- Notable commanders: Faisal Abdi Bilal Saadoun (DOW) ("Abu Layla", 2016); Dilsuz Hashme; Ibrahim Semho (Euphrates Liberation Brigade); Abu Jassim; Abu Khalaf; Ahmad Arsh (Manbij Revolutionaries Battalion); Ibrahim al-Banawi
- Dates active: 2 April 2016 – present
- Groups: Northern Sun Battalion; Euphrates Brigades; Soldiers of the Two Holy Mosques Brigade; Euphrates Martyrs Brigade; Dam Martyrs Brigade; Al-Qusais Brigade; Manbij Turkmen Battalion; Euphrates Liberation Brigade; Manbij Hawks Brigade; Manbij Revolutionaries Battalion; Martyr Adnan Abu Amjad Regiment; Martyr Abdo Dushka Regiment
- Headquarters: Tishrin Dam (pre-offensive); Manbij (post-offensive, until 2024); Unknown (since 2024)
- Active regions: Aleppo, Raqqa, Hasaka, and Deir ez-Zor governorates, Syria
- Size: 5,000–6,000 (2018)
- Part of: Syrian Democratic Forces (informal)
- Wars: Syrian civil war
- Website: Official website

The Manbij Military Council (MMC) is a coalition established by several groups in the Syrian Democratic Forces (SDF), primarily the Northern Sun Battalion, on 2 April 2016 at the Tishrin Dam on the Euphrates. The MMC led the SDF's Manbij offensive from June 2016 that led to the capture of the city of Manbij from the Islamic State of Iraq and the Levant two months later. Most fighters in the MMC are from Manbij and the surrounding areas.

== History ==
=== 2016 ===
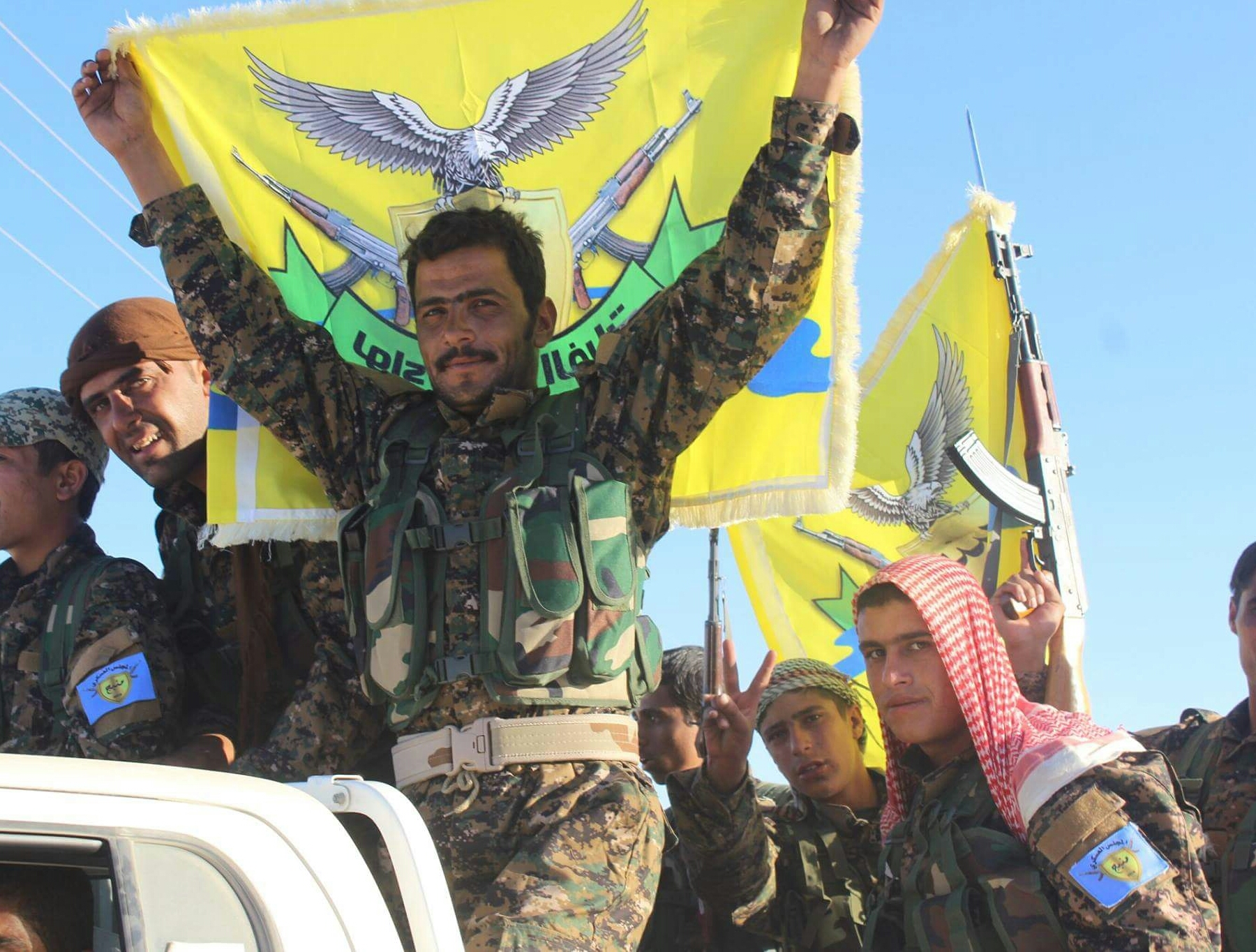
Fighters of the Euphrates Liberation Brigade, part of the Manbij Military Council, in Manbij

The Manbij offensive has included the Manbij Military Council, US special operations forces, and minimal YPG and YPJ involvement assisted by US-led coalition airstrikes. The SDF fighters are mostly Arabs. During the offensive, an SDF fighter gave his perspective as "we have Arabs, Kurds, nobody knows how many exactly, we all work under the SDF-forces".

On 5 April 2016, a civilian council was formed in the town of Sarrin by individuals originally from Manbij who had fled when Islamic State of Iraq and the Levant (ISIL) took over. The council consists of Arabs, Kurds, Turkmen, and Circassians, and was created to administer Manbij after its capture.

The commander of the Manbij Military Council, Abu Layla, died of wounds he suffered from gunshots in the Manbij front against the Islamic State. He was succeeded by Muhammad Mustafa ("Abu Adel").

On 19 August 2016, the Manbij Military Council issued a statement which announced that it was taking over the security of Manbij city center and villages from the YPG and YPJ, though some of their fighters remained to continue to provide training and other support duties.

In early November 2016, a 'battalion' from the Sham Legion defected and joined the MMC.

On 17 November 2016, the rest of the YPG and YPJ fighters left Manbij, leaving the security of the area and training of troops fully to the council.

=== 2017 ===
On 2 March 2017, the Manbij Military Council handed over a vast expanse of territory west of Manbij to the Syrian Army to create a buffer zone between the SDF and Turkish-backed rebels. They released a statement saying that "Defending the civilians and protecting them from the adverse impact of the war, ensuring the security of Manbij and frustrating the invasion plans of the Turkish army against Syrian soil are the goals we have taken for all the peoples living on the lands of Syria," and that

To reach these objectives [the defense of Manbij] we have transferred, after reaching a new alliance with Russia, the defence of the line to the west of Manbij – where the villages between us and the gang groups [FSA, Ahrar al-Sham] affiliated to the Turkish army are – to Syrian state forces."

and

The SDF ceded this territory west of Manbij because it is clear that there are limits to the extent that the United States will intervene on behalf of the SDF's interests west of the Euphrates.

On 17 April 2017, it was announced that 200 fighters from the council would participate in the Battle of Tabqa to take al-Thawra, part of the larger Raqqa campaign. On 24 May 2017, an additional 2,200 fighters were sent for the fourth phase of the campaign.

The Manbij Military Council fought in the Battle of Raqqa since 6 June 2017. On 29 August, Adnan Abu Amjad, general commander of the Manbij Military Council, was killed in action during the battle.

On 17 September 2017, Muhammad Mustafa Ali, also known by his nom de guerre "Abu Adel", was appointed the general commander of the Manbij Military Council as the successor of Adnan Abu Amjad. On 5 November 2017, Abu Adel was wounded by an IED of Harakat al-Qiyam, a rebel group in northern Syria.

On 27 November 2017, the Martyr Adnan Abu Amjad Regiment, consisting of 250 fighters was established, and joined the MMC.

=== 2018 ===
During the Turkish invasion of Afrin, the Manbij Military Council released a condemnation stating, “This aggression that practices ethnic cleansing and mass genocide against our people in Afrin is aimed for producing terrorist groups in areas where there is peace and coexistence.” The Council prepared to resist a possible Turkish attack on Manbij, with hundreds of additional SDF troops transferred from the Deir Ezzor frontlines.

On 5 June 2018, a day after Turkey and the U.S. agreed to a roadmap for the Manbij region, the YPG announced it would withdraw its remaining forces there, who they stated were serving as tactical advisors to the MMC.

=== 2019 ===
On 11 March 2019, Manbij Military Council Co-Chair Muhammad Mustafa told Al-Monitor that “Russian commanders told us exactly two days ago that the minute the Americans leave they will deploy their forces along the demarcation line.”

On 19 March, it was reported that the MMC had facilitated the capture of five Islamic State militants believed responsible for a January 2019 suicide bombing which killed four Americans.

On 26 March, the Islamic State claimed responsibility for a checkpoint bombing that killed 7 members of the MMC.

During Operation Peace Spring, the Council prepared to defend Manbij from Turkey, until the SDF reached a military agreement with the Syrian Government and Russia to prevent a Turkish operation.

On 15 October, under the terms of the military agreement, Russian and Syrian troops were positioned along SDF’s frontlines with Turkey in Manbij. While some international media outlets inaccurately reported that Manbij had come under Syrian Government control, the two sides only agreed to station the SAA on the Autonomous Administration’s borders with Turkey, and the Government has no institutions in Manbij.

=== 2020 ===
On 3 February 2019, the Manbij Military Council called on Manbij residents serving in Syrian National Army militias in Turkish-occupied zones to defect and return to the region.

On 10 June, the Council’s spokesperson, Shervan Derwish, survived an IED assassination attempt.

=== 2021 ===
On 2 June 2021, the Manbij Military Council announced it would halt regional conscription in the face of popular local protests, as well as some riots.

As with every other year, Turkish forces shelled MMC positions multiple times in 2021.

=== 2022 ===
Turkey shelled the Manbij countryside including many villages constantly in 2022, killing and displacing civilians as a result. The MMC and its components including the Kurdish Front, Al-Bab Military Council and the Army of Revolutionaries vowed again the resist any Turkish operation against Manbij region.

=== 2024 ===
As part of the Manbij offensive (2024) and the subsequent US brokered ceasefire between the SDF and Syrian National Army (SNA) Manbij Military Council forces withdrew from the city of Manbij. However as of December 25th they claimed to still have a presence on the west bank of the Euphrates in the city of Tishrin.

=== 2026 ===
The Manbij Military Council participated in defensive actions during the 2026 northeastern Syria offensive, claiming to have repelled a Turkish backed advance against their remaining positions east of Manbij on January 22.
