= Hazzm Movement =

Alliance of Syrian rebel groups

- حركة حزم; Ḥarakat Ḥazzm
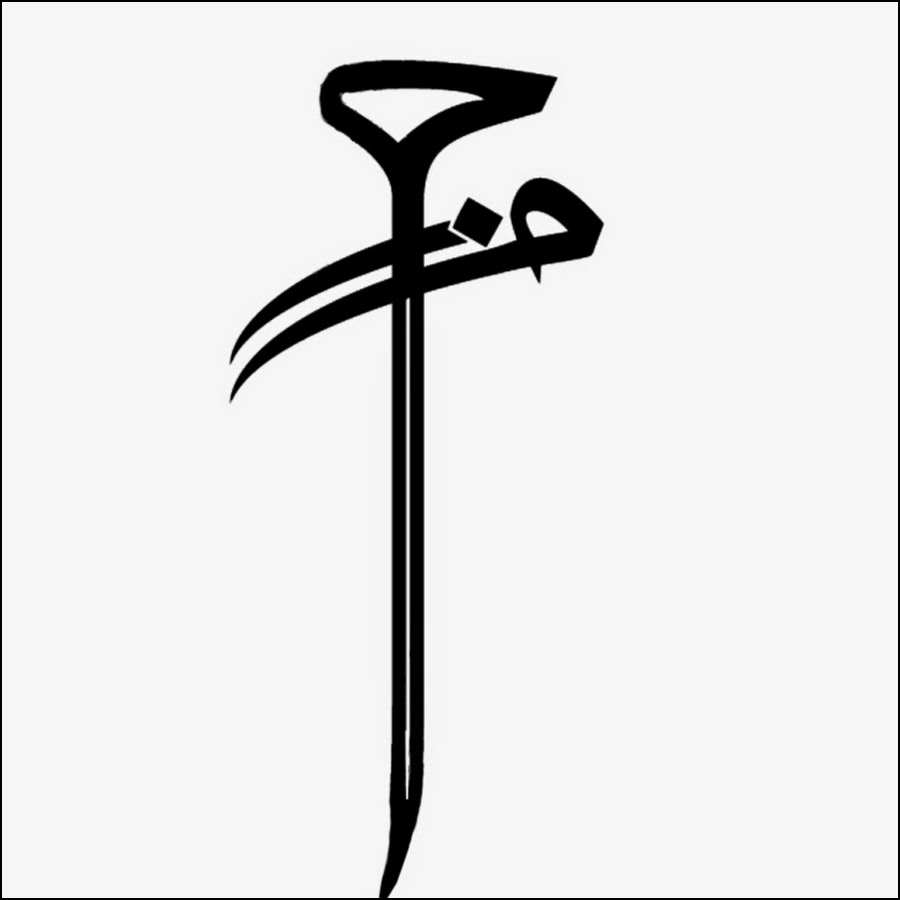
- Official logo of the Hazzm Movement Hazzm Movement flag
- Leaders: Abu Abdullah al-Kholi (POW); Salim Idris; Bilal Atar; Abdullah Awda; Hamza Shamali; Murshid al-Khalid; Mohammed al-Dahik; Sayf Bulad
- Dates active: 25 January 2014 – 1 March 2015
- Headquarters: Atarib, Aleppo Governorate, Syria
- Active regions: Aleppo Governorate; Idlib Governorate; Hama Governorate; Homs Governorate
- Size: 5,000 (2014)
- Part of: Free Syrian Army; Levant Front (Since 2015); Syrian Revolutionary Command Council
- Wars: the Syrian Civil War

The Hazzm Movement (Arabic: حركة حزم, Ḥarakat Ḥazzm, meaning Movement of Steadfastness) was an alliance of Syrian rebel groups affiliated with the Free Syrian Army in northwestern Syria that existed from 25 January 2014 until 1 March 2015, when many of them dissolved into the Levant Front. Some other members joined the Army of Revolutionaries.

== History ==
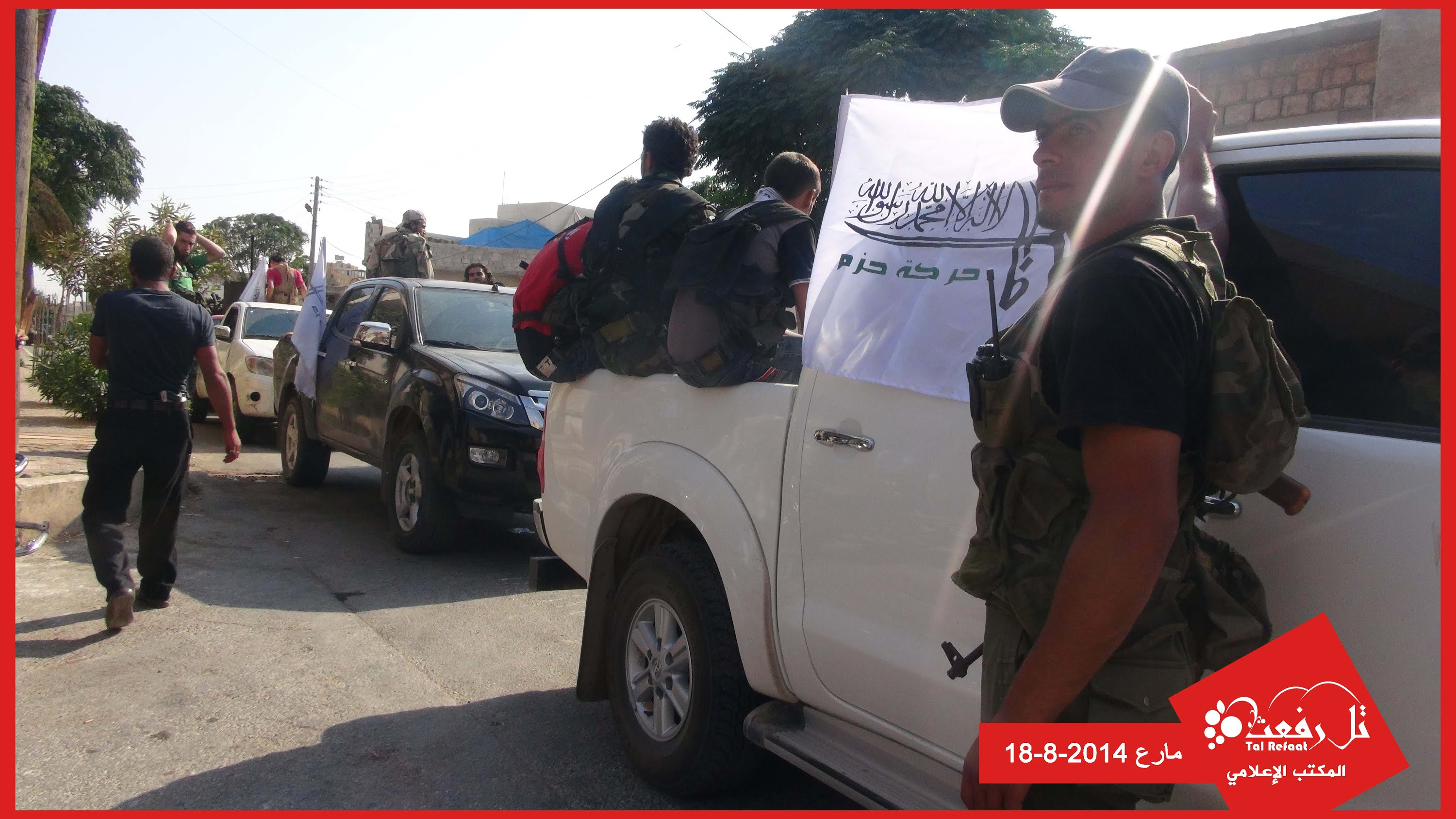
A convoy of Hazzm Movement fighters in the town of Mare' on 18 August 2014.

In late 2013 the former Supreme Military Council chief of staff Salim Idris planned to form the Hazzm Movement in response him being sacked as the chief of staff. The Hazzm Movement was established on 25 January 2014 when 12 small rebel factions merged. Several of the factions had been part of the Farouq Brigades. The groups that became the Army of Mujahedeen were originally going to join the Hazzm Movement. The previous incarnation of the group, called Harakat Zaman Mohamed (The movement of the time of Muhammad), was supported by the Muslim Brotherhood of Syria.

The group was supplied with BGM-71 TOW anti-tank missiles in a covert CIA program launched in 2014. Scores of the group's fighters also received U.S. military training in Qatar under the same program.

In October 2014, the al-Nusra Front began attacking positions of the Hazzm Movement in the Idlib Governorate, overrunning bases and seizing weapon stores, due to its perceived closeness to the United States. Following the loss of men and weapons to Nusra, the Idlib branch of Hazzm stopped receiving funds from the CIA in December 2014, funds to the Aleppo branch continued. In January 2015, al-Nusra attacked Hazzm Movement positions in the Aleppo Governorate. The Hazzm Movement reacted by joining the Levant Front, a large alliance of prominent Aleppo-based Islamist rebel groups; the alliance urged al Nusra to resolve its dispute with the Hazzm Movement by negotiating with the Levant Front.

On 3 May 2015, some of the former members of the northern branches of the Hazzm Movement, including the Atarib Martyrs Brigade, and the Syrian Revolutionaries Front along with Jabhat al-Akrad, the Dawn of Freedom Brigades main component group the Northern Sun Battalion (making the Dawn of Freedom Brigades defunct in the process) and smaller FSA groups formed the Army of Revolutionaries. Many of the northern members of the Syrian Revolutionaries Front and Hazzm Movement also joined the Levant Front.

During the Turkish military intervention in Syria which started in late August 2016, some former members of the Syrian Revolutionaries Front and the Hazzm Movement in exile from Turkey crossed into Syria through Jarabulus.

In late December 2016, the Hazzm Movement, the SRF, and the Ansar Brigades in exile reportedly declared their intentions to return to Syria.

== Component groups and structure ==
The Hazzm Movement had a northern division, led by Murshid al-Khalid (Abu Mutasim), and a southern division led by Mohammed al-Dahik (Abu Hatem). The Secretary-General was Bilal Atar (Abu Abd al-Sham). Abdullah Awda (Abu Zeid) was in charge of military operations and Hamza Shamali (Abu Hashem) in charge of political affairs.

The 12 groups that merged on 25 January 2014 to form the Hazzm Movement were:

- Atarib Martyrs Brigade—reportedly the largest faction of the Hazzm Movement before its dissolution, based in Atarib
- 9th Special Forces Division of Aleppo
- Farouq of the North Battalion
- Ayman of God Brigade
- Abi Harith Battalion – Farouq Hama
- Free Salamiya Battalion – Farouq Hama
- Martyr Abdul Ghaffar Hamish Battalion
- Martyr Abdullahi Bukar Battalion
- Salt of the Right Company
- Abu Assad al-Nimr Battalion

Several other groups joined the Hazzm Movement at a later date.

=== 9th Special Forces Division of Aleppo ===
The 9th Special Forces Division of Aleppo was a Syrian rebel group formerly affiliated with the Syria Revolutionaries Front and joined the Hazm Movement in January 2014. It was headed by Murshid al-Khaled (nom de guerre: Abu Mutasim).

Furthermore, the group was further composed of several additional subgroups before the merger:

- 1st Infantry Brigade
- 1st Armoured Brigade
- 60th Infantry Brigade
- Rocket Artillery Regiment
- Shahba Shield Brigade
- Ahbab Allah Brigade

== See also ==
- Timber Sycamore
- Syrian Train and Equip Program
- List of armed groups in the Syrian Civil War
