= Northern Aleppo offensive (February–July 2014) =

Military offensive launched by armed Syrian opposition forces

- Part of the Opposition–Islamic State conflict during the Syrian civil war
- Map showing the ISIS-held Azaz pocket in early February 2014
Date	13 February – 2 July 2014 (4 months, 2 weeks and 5 days)
Location	Northern Aleppo Governorate, Syria
Result	Partial rebel victory: FSA-led rebels recapture Azaz, Menagh Military Airbase, Deir Jamal, and a number of other towns and villages from ISIL; ISIL recapture several villages and retain the cities of al-Bab and Manbij and towns of Akhtarin, al-Rai and Jarabulus

Belligerents
(Syrian opposition) Free Syrian Army; Islamic Front; Al-Nusra Front	Islamic State

Commanders and leaders
(Syrian opposition) Alaa Ajabu † (Kurdish Front top commander) (Syrian opposition) Abu Walid (al-Tawhid Brigade northern commander) (Syrian opposition) Abu Ahmad Bakri (Glories of the Levant Brigade commander)	(Islamic State) Abu Omar al-Shishani

Units involved
(Syrian opposition) Free Syrian Army; (Syrian opposition) Free Syria Operations Room; (Syrian opposition) Dawn of Freedom Brigades; Northern Sun Battalion; Kurdish Front Brigade; Sultan Mehmed the Conqueror Brigade; Brigades and Battalions of Manbij; Glories of the Levant Brigade; Al-Bab Islamic Battalions; Free Zaydia Battalions; Islamic Front; (Syrian opposition) Al-Tawhid Brigade; (Syrian opposition) Conquest Brigade; (Syrian opposition) Northern Storm Brigade (from March 5)	(Islamic State) Military of ISIL: Wilayat Halab

The Northern Aleppo offensive (February–July 2014) was a military offensive launched by armed Syrian opposition forces led by the Free Syrian Army against the Islamic State of Iraq and the Levant in the northern Aleppo Governorate. The offensive resulted in ISIL's withdrawal from the city of Azaz, Menagh Military Airbase, and a number of towns and villages in the area.

== Background ==
ISIS captured the city of Azaz from the Northern Storm Brigade in September 2013. This resulted in the closure of the Bab al-Salam border crossing from Turkey further north. The Northern Storm Brigade and the al-Tawhid Brigade withdrew from the city and were stationed in its outskirts.

Full-blown conflict between ISIL and other rebel groups erupted in January 2014. In the first few days of the conflict, al-Qaeda's al-Nusra Front and Ahrar al-Sham brokered a ceasefire agreement with ISIL in the city of Aleppo and its northern countryside. However, ISIL continued its attacks on other rebel groups and killed more than 24 rebel fighters across northern Syria. The newly created Army of Mujahideen also pledged to fight ISIL in both Aleppo and Idlib.

== The offensive ==
=== First phase ===
On 13 February 2014, the Kurdish Front Brigade, the Northern Storm Brigade, and the Descendents of Messengers Brigade declared the beginning of a battle to recapture Azaz and the rest of northern Aleppo from ISIL, code named the Battle of Dignity. The groups declared the front to be a military exclusion zone and warned civilians to leave the area. The first clashes began in the village of Maryamin, Afrin and resulted in the Kurdish Front capturing the village. Clashes spread to Deir Jamal and several other villages. The top commander of the Kurdish Front, Alaa Ajabu, was killed in action during the fighting 4 days later.

By 28 February, ISIL forces withdrew from Azaz, Menagh Military Airbase, Deir Jamal, and several other villages. ISIL forces from the area retreated to their strongholds of al-Bab, Jarabulus and Manbij in eastern Aleppo.

=== Second phase ===
On 16 May 2014, 9 rebel groups formed the "Free Syria Operations Room", announced the beginning of the "Battle of Northern Earthquake", and declared the northern and eastern countrysides of Aleppo a military zone. Clashes took place in and near the town of al-Rai. ISIL reinforcements then arrived in al-Rai from Jarabulus to fight the rebels.

In July 2014, ISIL launched a large-scale counter-offensive and recaptured the village of Bahwartah, north of Akhtarin, as well as 5 other villages. However, the al-Nusra Front and the Tawhid Brigade soon recaptured 3 of these villages. In response to the ISIL offensive, 11 rebel groups threatened to withdraw from the frontlines in the area due to the lack of support.
