= Dawn of Freedom Brigades =

Syrian rebel alliance

- تجمع ألوية فجر الحرية; Tajamu Alwiya Fajr al-Hurriya
- Leaders: Hasan al-Banawi ("Abu Juma"); Faisal Saadoun ("Abu Layla"); Nizar al-Khatib ("Abu Laith"; former); Wael al-Khatib ("Abu Fuad") (POW); Muhammad Salah Shkoder †
- Dates active: 2014–2015
- Groups: Northern Sun Battalion; Euphrates Knights Brigade; Kurdish Front (2014)
- Headquarters: Mare' and Kobanî
- Active regions: Aleppo Governorate; Raqqa
- Part of: Free Syrian Army; Euphrates Volcano
- Wars: Syrian Civil War
- Website: fajeralhuria.com

The Dawn of Freedom Brigades (Arabic: تجمع ألوية فجر الحرية, romanized: Tajamu Alwiya Fajr al-Hurriya) was a Free Syrian Army-affiliated Syrian rebel alliance which participated in the Syrian Civil War. It coordinated with the joint operations room Euphrates Volcano and eventually became part of the Army of Revolutionaries (Jaysh al-Thuwar) in 2015.

== History ==
The founder of the Dawn of Freedom Brigades was Nizar al-Khatib, also known by his nom de guerre "Abu Laith". Al-Khatib was a commander in the Ghuraba al-Sham Front, which was defeated by Islamist rebel forces led by the Islamic State of Iraq and the Levant between mid and late 2013. During this time, Nizar al-Khatib formed the Descendents of Messengers Brigade as an offshoot of Ghuraba al-Sham. In January 2014 and February, amid widespread conflict between ISIL and other rebel groups, including in northern Aleppo, the Descendents of Messengers Brigade forged an alliance with the Kurdish Front. In March 2014, the brigade changed its name to the Dawn of Freedom Brigades.

On 8 November 2014, a field commander of the Dawn of Freedom Brigades was killed by the al-Nusra Front. On 18 November, Nizar al-Khatib ("Abu Laith") was replaced by Hasan al-Banawi ("Abu Juma") as the leader of the coalition due to "health issues" of al-Khatib.

On 5 December 2014, the Supporters of Dawn of Freedom Brigade based in Idlib defected from the Dawn of Freedom Brigades. On 24 December, the Grievous Response Force, which included the al-Nusra Front and the Islamic Mujahideen Army, raided the Dawn of Freedom Brigades' headquarters in Mare'. Al-Nusra captured Wael al-Khatib ("Abu Fuad"), general commander of the group, and several other commanders during the raid.

On 3 May 2015, some of the former members of the Hazzm Movement and the Syria Revolutionaries Front along with Jabhat al-Akrad, the Dawn of Freedom Brigades' main component group the Northern Sun Battalion (making the Dawn of Freedom Brigades defunct in the process) and smaller FSA groups formed the Army of Revolutionaries.

Although most of the Dawn of Freedom Brigades joined the Army of Revolutionaries, its founder, Nizar al-Khatib, did not, and criticized the Army.

== See also ==
- List of armed groups in the Syrian Civil War
