= Martyrs' Cemetery, Kobanî =

Cemetery in Kobanî, Syria

Martyrs' Cemetery
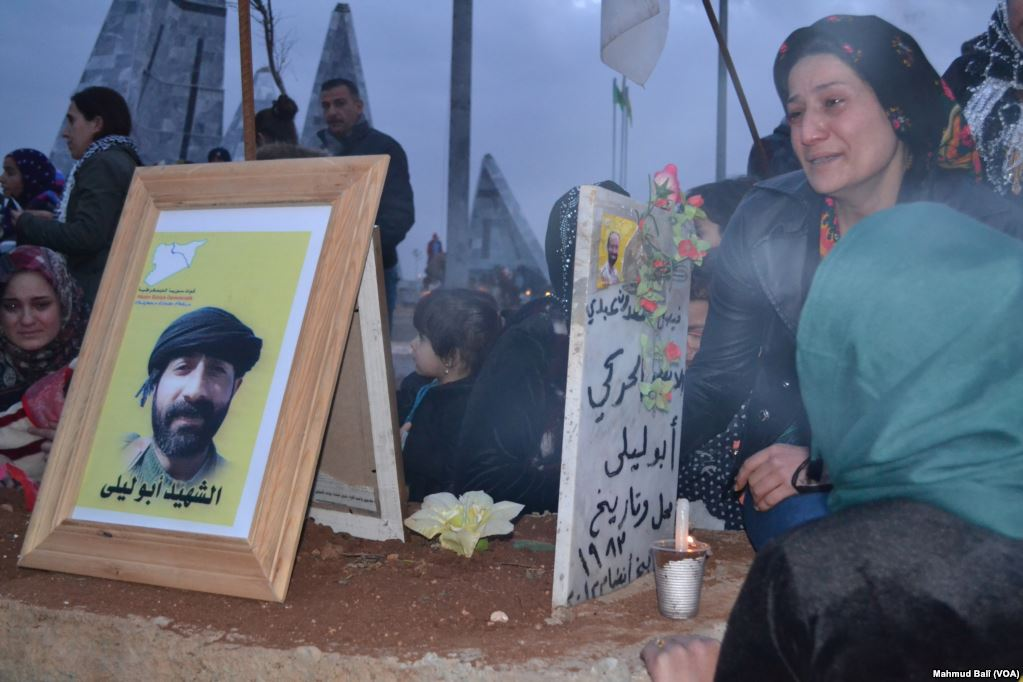
- Abu Layla's grave in front of the Martyrs' Monument
- Interactive map of Martyrs' Cemetery

Details
- Established: 2012
- Country: Syria
- Coordinates: 36°51′54″N 38°20′12″E
- Owned by: Kobanî Martyrs' Institute
- No. of graves: 1300

The Martyrs' Cemetery (Kurdish: Merzelî Şehîdan Kobanê) is in Kobanî, in the Rojava region of Syria. It was established in 2012 and is used for the members of the Syrian Democratic Forces (SDF) (in particular those of the People's Protection Units (YPG) and the Women's Protection Units (YPJ) killed during the Rojava conflict, part of the Syrian civil war. Many of the defenders killed during the siege of Kobanî against the Islamic State of Iraq and the Levant (ISIL) are buried here. By 2019, approximately 1300 had been buried at the cemetery.

The dead are remembered every month with a martyrs' ceremony. The graves are made of marble and ordered in symmetrical rows and the cemetery is maintained by employees of the Martyrs' Institute. The cemetery includes five spikes arranged in a hemicycle and a dome erected as a memorial. In the dome, artifacts and images of the fallen are displayed. Abu Layla, a well-known SDF commander, is buried there.
