= Euphrates Liberation Brigade =

- Liwa Tahrir al-Furat
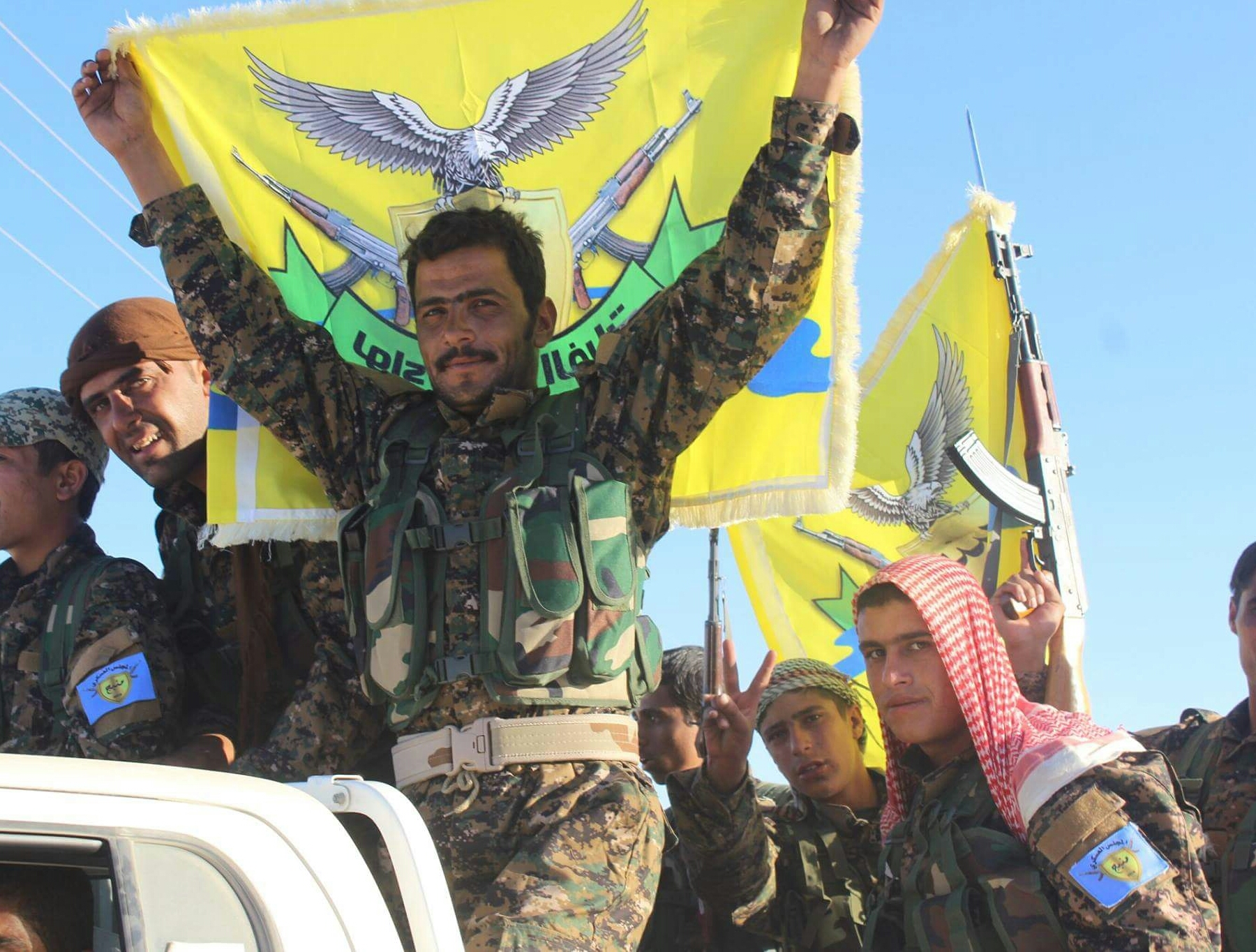
- Members of the militia with their flag
- Leaders: Ibrahim Semho (commander); Enwer Xebat (founder)
- Dates active: October 2016 – present
- Headquarters: Manbij (until 2024)
- Ideology: Syrian federalism Democracy; Anti-racism; Anti-Islamism
- Size: 250+
- Part of: Syrian Democratic Forces: Manbij Military Council
- Wars: Syrian civil war

The Euphrates Liberation Brigade (Arabic: Liwa Tahrir al-Furat) is a mostly Arab militia that operates as part of the Syrian Democratic Forces' Manbij Military Council (MMC) in the Syrian civil war.

== History ==
The Euphrates Liberation Brigade was founded in Manbij as part of the MMC in October 2016. Originally 250 men strong, the militia expanded over time, mostly recruiting Arabs from Manbij city and its surroundings. Several of its fighters are former Free Syrian Army (FSA) members who abandoned the rebellion against Bashar al-Assad due to the increasing Islamist radicalism among anti-government forces. Regardless, the Begin–Sadat Center has considered the militia to be still part of the FSA.

Soon after its formation, the Euphrates Liberation Brigade fought the Islamic State of Iraq and the Levant (ISIL) west of Manbij during the Battle of al-Bab, in course of which it was allegedly bombed by the Turkish Air Force on 20 November. In April 2017, elements of the Euphrates Liberation Brigade were among a contingent of 200 MMC fighters that were sent to al-Thawrah in order to help the SDF to capture the city from ISIL. Under the command of Ibrahim Semho, the militia also took part in the following battle for ISIL's self-proclaimed capital Raqqa. Other parts of the unit remained at the frontlines west of Manbij, where at least one of their fighters was captured by Turkish-backed rebels in May 2017.

== Ideology ==
The Euphrates Liberation Brigade has been set up from the outset as ethnically inclusivist and pro-democratic. Its stated aim is to help establish a federal, democratic Syria. The militia is also opposed to radical Islamism.
