= Abu Layla =

Syrian Kurdish Commander of the Free Syrian Army and the SDF (1984-2016)

Faisal Abdi Bilal Saadoun
- فيصل عبدي بلال سعدون
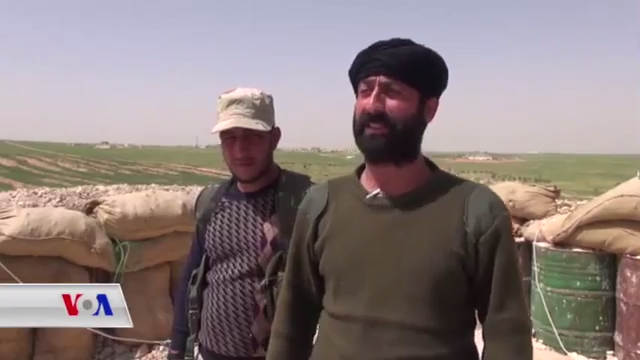
- Born: 1984; Kobanî, Syria
- Died: 5 June 2016 (aged 31–32); Sulaymaniyah, Iraqi Kurdistan
- Military career
- Allegiance: Syrian opposition (2012–13); AANES (2013–2016)
- Branch: Free Syria Brigade (2012–13); Kurdish Front (2013–14); Northern Sun Battalion (2014–16)
- Service years: 2012–16
- Nickname: Abu Layla (Arabic: أبو ليلى)
- Conflicts: Syrian Civil War; Battle of Aleppo; Rojava–Islamist conflict; Siege of Kobanî (WIA); Kobanî massacre; Manbij offensive (2016) (DOW)

Faisal Abdi Bilal Saadoun (1984 – 5 June 2016), widely known as Abu Leyla or Abu Layla (Arabic: أبو ليلى), was a Kurdish commander in both the Free Syrian Army and the Syrian Democratic Forces (SDF). He is regarded by many as a hero of the Rojava–Islamist conflict.

Abu Layla was born near Kobanî and is of Kurdish heritage; he died in a hospital in Sulaymaniyah, Kurdistan Region, Iraq. His death was caused by a sniper bullet to the head he received in the Abu Qelqel village during an offensive against the Islamic State in Manbij on 5 June 2016. At the time of his death, he was a prominent commander in the SDF.

== Early life ==
Abu Layla grew up in Manbij and was, before the Syrian Civil War, a car mechanic. He was married and had four daughters.

== Syrian Civil War ==
=== Rebellion against the government and the rise of ISIL (2012–14) ===
Since the beginning of the Syrian Civil War in 2011, Abu Layla participated in protests against the Syrian government. At the end of 2012, he joined the rebels of the Free Syrian Army and become a commander in the Free Syria Brigade. He took part in the fight against the Syrian Arab Army of the Bashar al-Assad government in Aleppo (al-'Ashrafiya, Sheikh Maqsood, Ancient City of Aleppo), in the Latakia Governorate, and north of Raqqa in Ayn Issa. Between the end of 2012 and beginning of 2013, he co-founded the Kurdish Front Brigade, which was then part of the Free Syria Brigade. Some time later, the Kurdish Front left the Free Syria Brigade to become an independent rebel group due to the internal disputes and "intolerant behavior" displayed by the group toward Kurds in Syria.

In 2013, Abu Layla led a small unit in the Kurdish Front Brigade and took part in assassination operations against the Islamic State of Iraq and the Levant in Manbij and Jarabulus. In April 2014, they established the Northern Sun Battalion (Arabic: كتائب شمس الشمال, translit. kata'eb shams ash-shamal) near Manbij.

=== Rise to fame in Kobani (2014) ===
Abu Layla found himself besieged with his battalion in the Syrian city of Kobani from September 2014. During the Siege of Kobani, he gained widespread attention on the Internet after allegedly saving an Islamic State fighter from the rubble. During the siege he was wounded seven times, including once on 29 November 2014 when he was transported to Turkey for treatment, but returned to lead his battalion alongside the YPG and Peshmerga. The siege of the city was broken in January 2015 after 112 days of fighting with help from more than 600 airstrikes by the American-led coalition.

=== After Kobani (2015–16) ===
Although he decided to quit as a commander in early 2015, he changed his mind and joined the 2015 offensives of Tell Abyad and Al-Hasakah. He was one of the founders of the Syrian Democratic Forces. With his battalion, he took part in the successful offensive in Ayn Issa, Al-Shaddadah, Sarrin and Tishrin Dam in December 2015. He co-founded the Manbij Military Council and in 2016 he was active with his battalion in the area around Tishreen Dam and Manbij.

=== Death and legacy ===
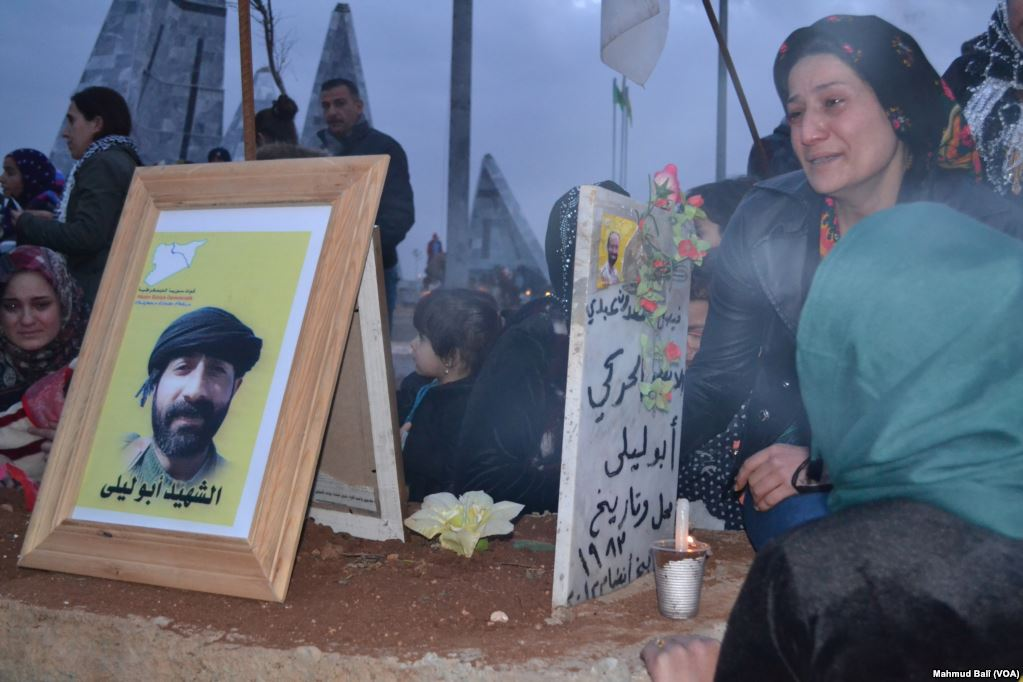
Tomb of Abu Layla in the Martyrs' cemetery in Kobanî

Abu Layla died on 5 June 2016, after being shot in the head by an Islamic State sniper on Friday 3 June, in the countryside south of Manbij, Syria. He had previously been evacuated by a US military helicopter to a hospital in Sulaymaniyah, Iraqi Kurdistan, but doctors were unable to remove the bullet in his head and prevent internal bleeding in the brain. A large funeral ceremony was held for Abu Layla in the martyrs cemetery in Kobanî. Other SDF and FSA commanders, including Abdul Sattar al-Jader and Muhammad Ahmed of the Euphrates Jarabulus Brigades and Abdul Karim Obeid of the Tahrir Brigade attended the funeral.

The Syrian Democratic Forces named the operation against Islamic State in Manbij "Martyr Abu Leyla operation" in his memory.

His brother Yussuf Abu Sa’dun was captured on 4 July by the Islamic State in the same operation near Manbij. The Kurdish Rudaw Media Network names him as Yousif Babe Aziz, a 42-year-old father of five. According to Rudaw, one of Aziz’s relatives told news agencies that they did not know Aziz had been captured by the Islamic State until they saw the footage released last night. "Yousif put Abu Layla’s rifle on his shoulder and decided to go to Manbij to fight ISIS. But he disappeared once he left Kobani towards Manbij. We looked for him a lot, but could not do anything," said Jalal Ahmed, a cousin of Aziz.
