= Northern Sun Battalion =

Armed Syrian rebel group

- كتائب شمس الشمال
- Leaders: Muhammad Mustafa Ali ("Abu Adel") (co-general commander, 2014-16,^{[a]} general commander since 2016); Faisal Saadoun ("Abu Layla") (DOW) (leading commander,^{[a]} 2014-16); Adnan Abu-Amjad † (former deputy commander); Sherwan Derwish (commander and spokesperson); Brig. Gen. Mohammed Hammou (first commander); Adnan al-Ahmad (commander-in-chief in Hasakah Governorate); Raizan Abu Mahmoud (commander); Abdul Qader Sheikh Muhammad ("Abdo Dushka") † (field commander, killed in April 2015); Ibrahim al-Banawi (Soldiers of the Two Holy Mosques Brigade commander); Gaddafi Abu Ali Jreikh † (Dam Martyrs Brigade commander)
- Dates active: April 2014 – present
- Groups: Euphrates Brigades; Soldiers of the Two Holy Mosques Brigade; Euphrates Martyrs Brigade; Dam Martyrs Brigade; Al-Qusais Brigade; Manbij Turkmen Brigade
- Headquarters: Manbij, Aleppo Governorate (until 2024); Kobani, Aleppo Governorate (since 2024)
- Active regions: Aleppo Governorate; Raqqa Governorate; Hasakah Governorate
- Ideology: Federalism; Democracy
- Size: +100 (2014); 2,500 (self-claim in 2016)
- Part of: Manbij Military Council; Syrian Democratic Forces; Free Syrian Army; Army of Revolutionaries (2015–2016); Euphrates Volcano (2014–2015); Dawn of Freedom Brigades (2014–2015)
- Wars: Syrian Civil War

The Northern Sun Battalion (Arabic: كتائب شمس الشمال, romanized: Katā'ib Šams aš-Šamāl) is an armed rebel group affiliated with the Free Syrian Army and part of the Syrian Democratic Forces that has been active during the Syrian Civil War.

== History ==
Commanders of the Northern Sun Battalion
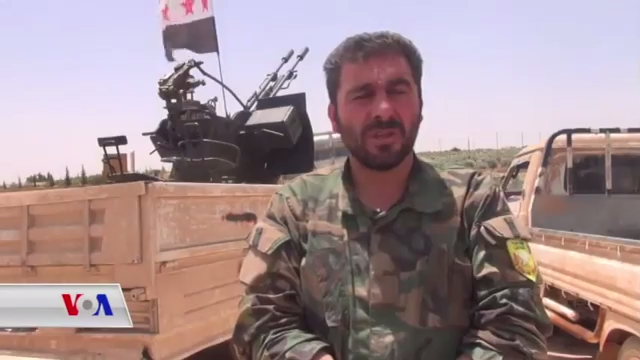
Muhammad Mustafa Ali, known by his nom de guerre "Abu Adel", general commander of the Northern Sun Battalion since 2014.^{[a]}

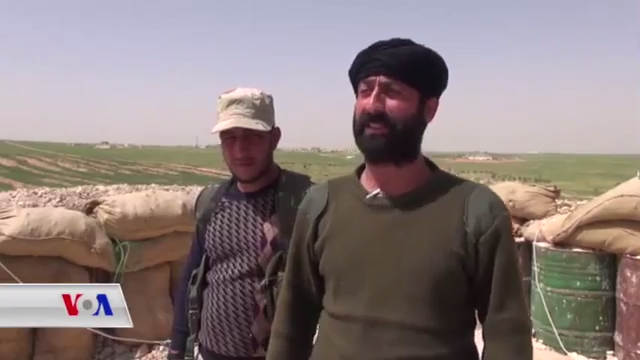
Saadoun al-Faisal, known by his nom de guerre "Abu Layla", general commander of the group from 2014 to June 2016.^{[a]}

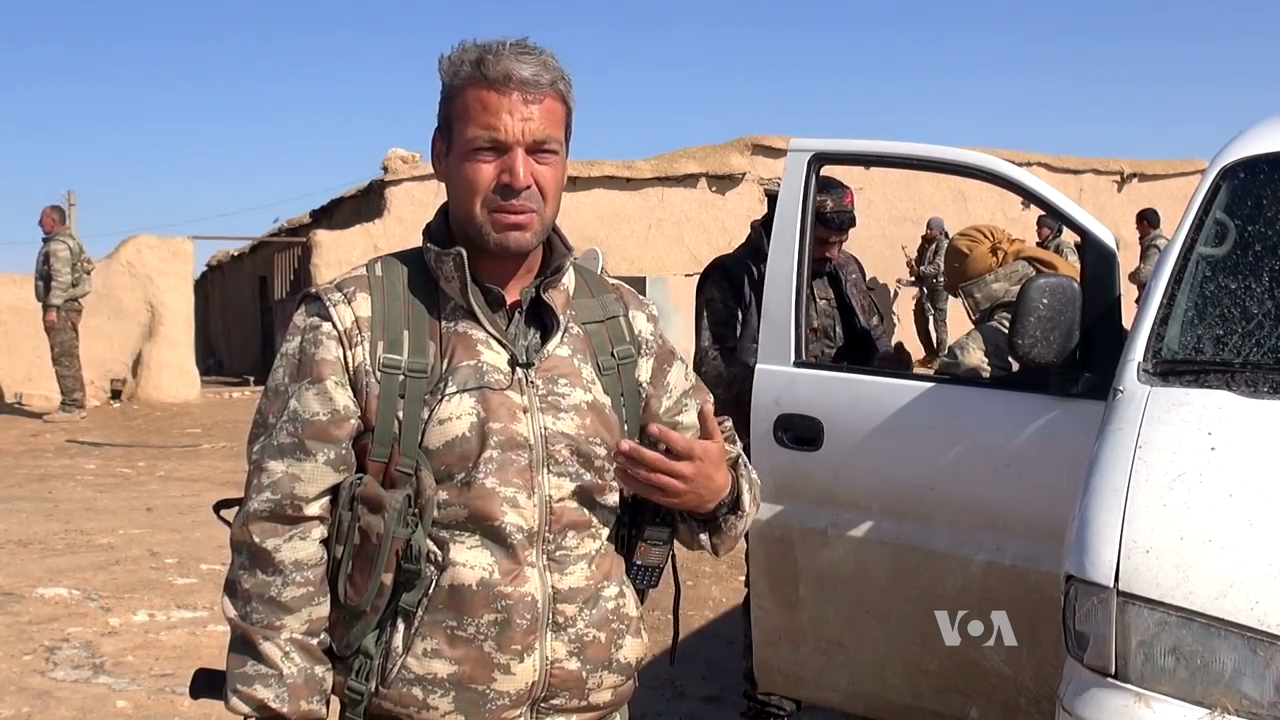
Adnan Abu Amjad, deputy commander of the group until his death in August 2017.

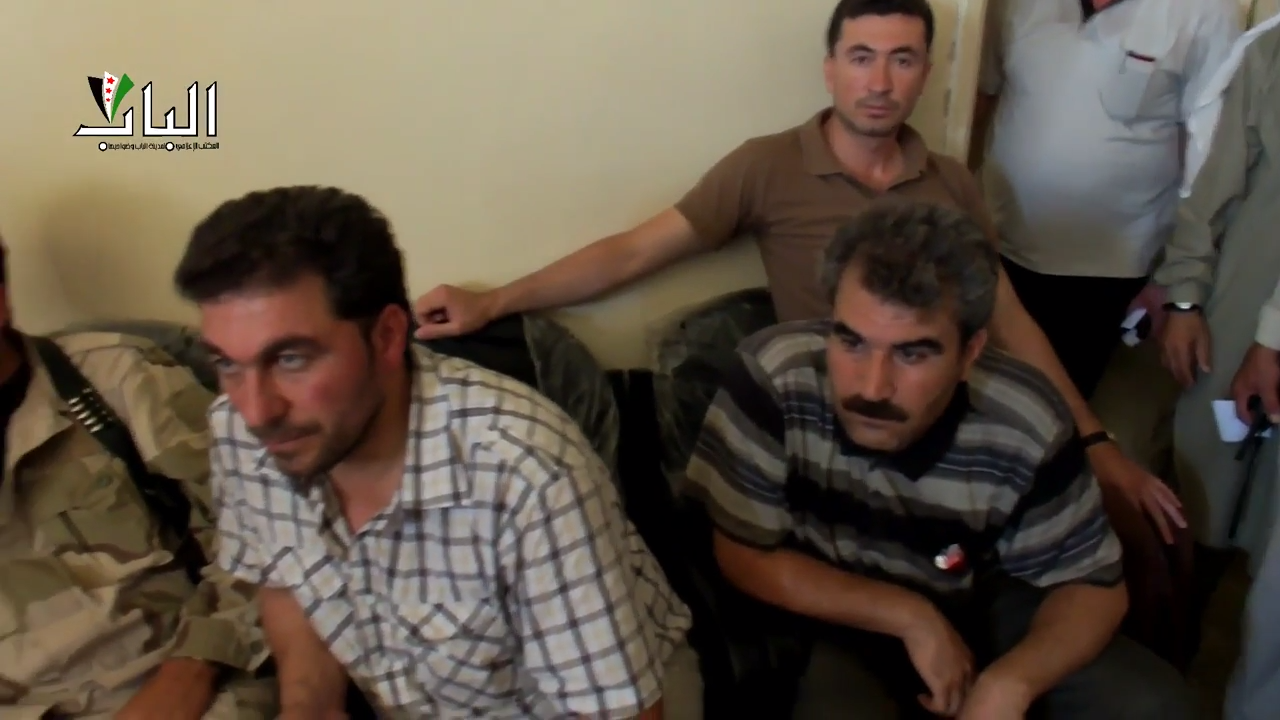
Muhammad Mustafa Ali (left) and Shervan Derwish (right) in Qabasin, July 2013, then as commanders of the Kurdish Front. They would later become commanders of the Northern Sun Battalion.

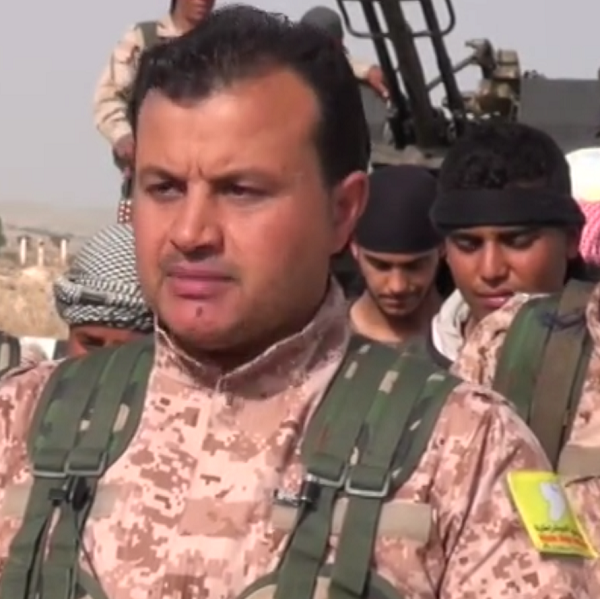
Ibrahim al-Banawi, leader of the Soldiers of the Two Holy Mosques Brigade

The formation of the Northern Sun Battalion was announced by Mohammed Hammou, a brigadier general who defected from the Syrian Armed Forces, in the Manbij countryside on 16 April 2014. Less than a week later, several other small groups and individuals joined the battalion, including Abu Layla and several other commanders from the Kurdish Front and the Free Syria Brigade's eastern branch.

On 3 May 2015, some of former members of the northern branches of the Hazzm Movement, (including the Atarib Martyrs Brigade) and the Syrian Revolutionaries Front along with Jabhat al-Akrad, the Dawn of Freedom Brigades main component group the Northern Sun Battalion (making the Dawn of Freedom Brigades defunct in the process) and smaller FSA groups formed the Army of Revolutionaries. Many of the northern members of the Syrian Revolutionaries Front and Hazzm Movement also joined the Levant Front.

In October 2015 it became part of the Syrian Democratic Forces. Subsequently, the Dawn of Freedom Brigades went defunct.

In November, the battalion participated in the Syrian Democratic Force's al-Hawl offensive, and according to commander-in-chief Adnan al-Ahmad was committed to pushing ISIL out of al-Shaddadah and Raqqa, as well as from Jarablus, the Tishrin Dam and Manbij.

When the Manbij Military Council was set up on 3 April 2016, the battalion's second-in-command, Adnan Abu-Amjad, was made the council's general commander. In course of the following Manbij offensive, one of the Northern Sun Battalion's most prominent commanders was killed: Abu Layla died on 5 June 2016, after being shot in the head by an Islamic State sniper on Friday June third, in the countryside south of Manbij, Syria. He had previously been evacuated by a US military helicopter to a hospital in Sulaymaniyah, Iraqi Kurdistan, but doctors were unable to remove a bullet to the head and prevent internal bleeding to the brain.

On 28 August 2017, pro-Syrian government media reported that Ibrahim al-Banawi, commander of the Northern Sun Battalion's Soldiers of the Two Holy Mosques Brigade, had defected to the Syrian Army in the southern Raqqa countryside; this was proven to be false, as Ibrahim was still with the Northern Sun Battalion in January 2018. On 29 August 2017, Adnan Abu Amjad, former deputy commander of the Northern Sun Battalion and the general commander of the Manbij Military Council, was killed in action during the Battle of Raqqa.

On 17 September 2017, Muhammad Mustafa Ali, also known by his nom de guerre "Abu Adel", the general commander of the Northern Sun Battalion, was appointed the general commander of the Manbij Military Council as the successor of Adnan Abu Amjad.

== Additional groups that joined ==
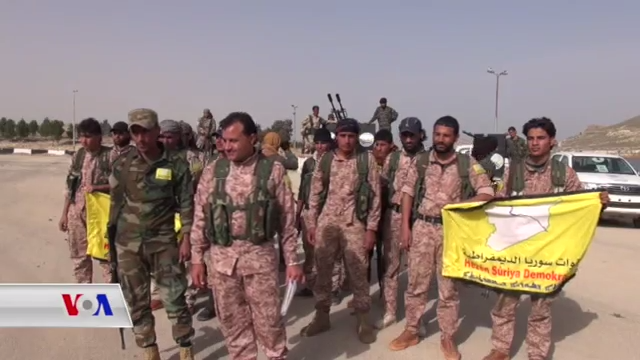
The Soldiers of the Two Holy Mosques Brigade, which joined the Northern Sun Battalion in March 2016.

- On 21 April 2014, 5 rebel groups from the Euphrates basin of Manbij, Jarabulus, and Sarrin joined the Northern Sun Battalion.
- The Euphrates Martyrs Battalion joined the Northern Sun Battalion in Kobane on 13 January 2016.
- The Dam Martyrs Brigade joined the group on 4 February 2016.
- On 10 March 2016, the Soldiers of the Two Holy Mosques Brigade joined the group. It was previously part of the al-Tawhid Brigade, the Army of Mujahideen, and Jaysh al-Salam.

== War crimes ==
On 15 March 2017, a video surfaced that showed members of the Northern Sun Battalion torturing an ISIL fighter, who had been captured while planting mines. One of these mines had killed nine fighters of the battalion, leading five others to take revenge on the ISIL militant. The Manbij Military Council condemned the act, and announced that the involved Northern Sun Battalion fighters would be held for trial for violating the Geneva Conventions. The five accused were subsequently arrested on 17 March.

== See also ==
- List of armed groups in the Syrian Civil War

== Notes ==
^{a} Unclear, as both Abu Adel and Abu Layla were described as the general commander of the Northern Sun Battalion between 2014 and 2016.
