= Army of Revolutionaries =

Multi-ethnic armed Syrian rebel coalition

- جيش الثوار; Jayš al-Thuwwār
- One of the logos of Jaysh al-Thuwar
- Leaders: Ahmed Mahmoud Sultan ("Abu Araj") (general commander since late 2016); Abdul Malik Bard ("Abu Ali") (former general commander until late 2016); Hasan Banawi ("Abu Juma") (Tribal Forces top commander); Abu Raad Bakary (Tribal Forces commander); Khalaf Mus'ab; Rami al-Agha; Former: Absi Taha ("Abu Omar") (al-Qa'qa Brigade and former Army of Revolutionaries military commander); Omar Rakhmon ("Tariq Abu Zeid") (surrendered) (former spokesperson); Abu Arab (777th Regiment commander); Abdul Aziz Mirza (Sultan Selim Brigade commander)
- Dates active: 3 May 2015–present
- Headquarters: Tel Rifaat, Aleppo Governorate (until 2024)
- Active regions: Al-Hasakah Governorate; Aleppo Governorate; Idlib Governorate; Raqqa Governorate; Deir ez-Zor Governorate
- Ideology: Federalism; Democracy; Syrian nationalism
- Size: 1,800–3,000 fighters (2015); 2,000–3,000 fighters (2016)
- Part of: Syrian Democratic Forces Al-Bab Military Council (Syrian opposition) Free Syrian Army; Former: Euphrates Volcano (dissolved, 2015); Fatah Halab (former, 2015)
- Wars: the Syrian Civil War

The Army of Revolutionaries (Arabic: جيش الثوار, romanized: Jayš al-Thuwwār), also known as Jaysh al-Thuwar, is a multi-ethnic armed Syrian rebel coalition that is allied with the primarily Kurdish People's Protection Units (YPG) and participating in the Syrian Civil War as part of the Syrian Democratic Forces (SDF).

Established as a Free Syrian Army coalition in May 2015, with a presence in six governorates, its membership includes Arabs, Kurds, and Turkmen. With its stated aims of fighting both the Ba'athist regime and Islamic State of Iraq and the Levant (ISIL), it was expected to become one of the more relevant rebel alliances in northern Syria, consolidating the democratic rebel spectrum. It was considered one of the "potential powerbrokers" in the Aleppo, Hama, Idlib, and Latakia governorates.

While Jaysh al-Thuwar considers itself to be a part of the rebel mainstream and turned down the U.S. Train-and-Equip-Program because it wanted to be able to fight the Syrian government as well as ISIL, it has always been allied with the YPG. It therefore did not receive Turkish support, rejected the Friends of Syria Group, and became embroiled in open conflict with Islamist rebel groups.

Subsequently, Jaysh al-Thuwar retreated from rebel-held areas and further deepened its bonds with the YPG. In October 2015, it became one of the constituents of the Syrian Democratic Forces, increasingly integrating with the SDF's common frontlines against ISIL and other Islamist forces.

Although it cooperates with the YPG, Jaysh al-Thuwar still considers itself to be part of the Syrian Opposition.

== Establishment ==
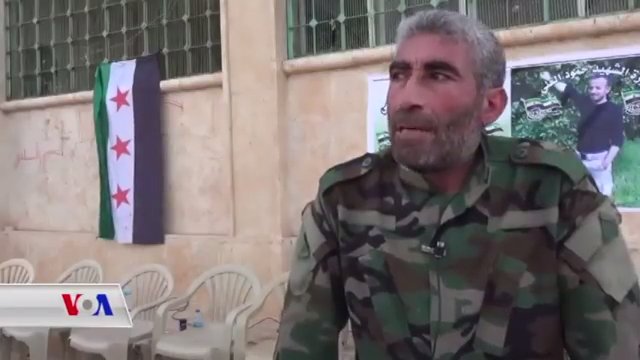
Ahmed Mahmoud Sultan, also known by his nom de guerre "Abu Araj", the general commander of the Army of Revolutionaries

On 3 May 2015, some of the former members of the northern branches of the Hazzm Movement and the Syria Revolutionaries Front (SRF) along with Jabhat al-Akrad, the Dawn of Freedom Brigades main component group the Northern Sun Battalion (making the Dawn of Freedom Brigades defunct in the process) and smaller FSA groups formed the Army of Revolutionaries. The participation of ex-SRF fighters in the new group was denounced by former SRF leader Jamal Maarouf who was strongly opposed to the YPG. Many of the northern members of the Syrian Revolutionaries Front and Hazzm Movement also joined the Levant Front, the group also has exiles from the Homs Governorate that were expelled from the region by Hezbollah in 2013.

In an October 2015 publication, the Washington D.C.–based Institute for the Study of War considered Jaysh al-Thuwar as one of the "potential powerbrokers" in Aleppo province, where it is part of the Euphrates Volcano joint operations room, as well as in Hama, Idlib and Latakia provinces, though not in Homs province.

=== Stances ===
The group has expressed disapproval of foreign presence in Syria, specifically condemning the involvement of Russia, Iran, and Turkey. In regards to the deployment of the Turkish military into Idlib, Ahmed Sultan said that Idlib had been sold to Russia and Iran as well as the Syrian government and called upon Idlib's population to fight Iranian, Russian and Turkish forces in Idlib. Sultan has also blamed Turkey's presence in Idlib for Russian airstrikes, saying "Idlib's southern countryside has been destroyed by aircraft, the Syrian regime, and the modern weapons that Russia is testing in that region," and that if Idlib were attacked it would cause a large humanitarian disaster, and that the group would fight to end Turkey's presence in both Idlib and Afrin. In response to the Syrian government's offensive in Idlib in early 2019, the group released a joint statement with a fellow Free Syrian Army-aligned SDF group known as the Northern Democratic Brigade stating both groups were ready to protect Idlib from an Iranian-led Shiite invasion, and stating that Iran's involvement in Syria is as bad as Turkey's.

=== Governance ===
In areas the group controls or has a presences in it conducts social outreach programs such as organizing Eid al-Adha celebrations and distribution of gifts to locals, as well as visiting hospitals. The group also organized protests in response to the rebel loss in Aleppo in December 2016, calling for the fall of the Syrian government.

== Battles and territorial presences ==
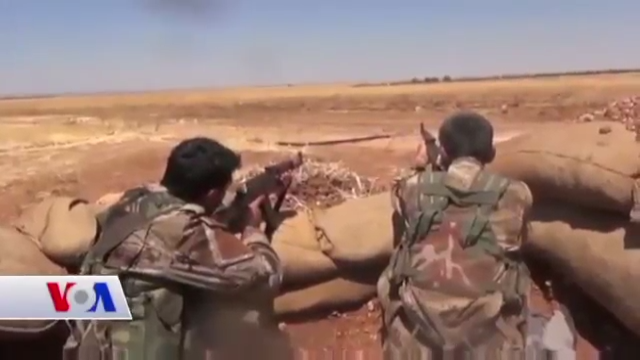
Kurdish Front fighters, part of Jaysh al-Thuwar, near the town of Herbel in July 2016

Jaysh al-Thuwar did not apply to join the American Train-and-Equip-Program because it declined to restrict itself to fighting ISIL. The Army subsequently released videos of them fighting both against the Syrian Army in Aleppo and the northern Homs pocket, as well as against ISIL in Mare', Kobanê and northern Raqqa.

It controlled territory to the west of Azaz, bordering the Kurdish-held Afrin Canton, and claimed further presences in the Rashidin neighborhood of Aleppo, as well as in Tell Malah and al-Ghab Plain areas in northern Hama, and sleeper cells in Manbij area.

The Army of Revolutionaries did not qualify for any support by Turkey, but neither did it receive any U.S. support. With weaponry considered "sparse by even Syrian standards", the coalition began to disintegrate early on.

In July 2015, Division 30 fighters retreated to territory controlled by the Army of Revolutionaries west of Azaz after being attacked by the al-Nusra Front. This led to clashes between the Army of Revolutionaries and al-Nusra.

On 29 August 2015, 30 fighters from the Army of Revolutionaries graduated from a boot camp west of Azaz, named after Alaa Ajabu, the former general commander of the Kurdish Front who was killed in action fighting against ISIL near Azaz in February 2014.

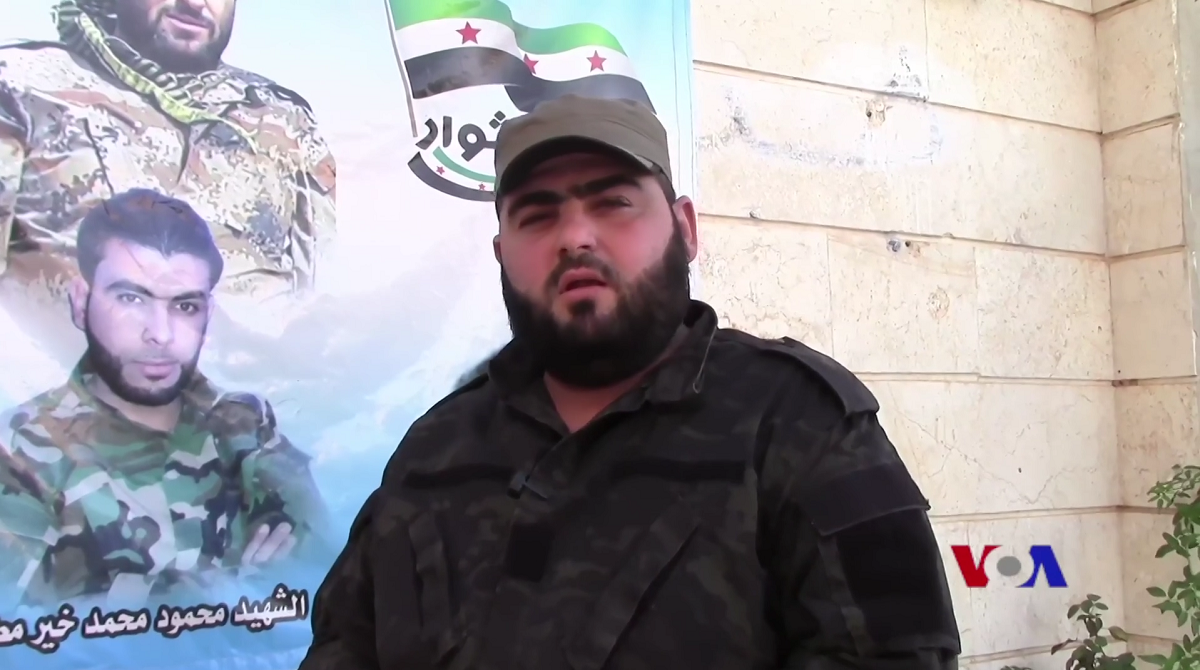
Abdul Malik Bard, also known by his nom de guerre "Abu Ali", general commander of the group until late 2016

On 13 February 2016, the Homs Liberation Movement declared hostilities on the Army of Revolutionaries. This led to the defection of two groups affiliated with the Army of Revolutionaries in Homs: the Homs Revolutionary Union and the 777th Regiment. With this incident, the Army of Revolutionaries no longer operate in the Homs Governorate. However, a commander in the Homs Liberation Movement claimed that some rebels in Homs still have covert links to Jaysh al-Thuwar, but refused to name the groups, citing that "they deceived him" and he "does not know the nature of the said army's relationship with the enemies of the revolution".

Jaysh al-Thuwar claims to have a presence in the Idlib Governorate. Orient News claimed that the group has cells in Ariha that conducted assassinations and "kidnapping operations" in the Idlib countryside and 12 of them were reportedly captured by the Army of Conquest in March 2016.

When the Battle of Qamishli broke out between Rojavan security forces and the regime in 2021, Jaysh al-Thuwar deployed to Qashimi to reenforce the security forces.

== Integration into the Syrian Democratic Forces ==
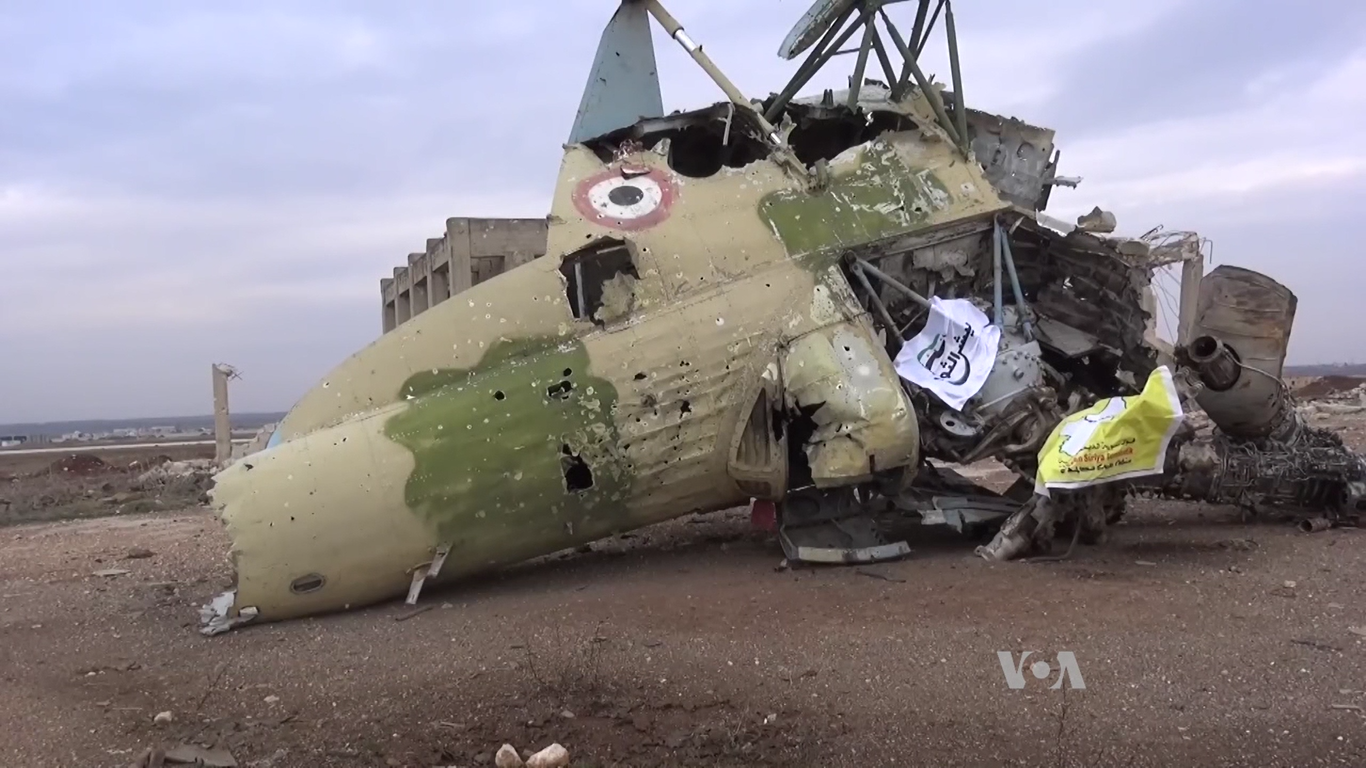
Flags of the Army of Revolutionaries and the Syrian Democratic Forces on the wreckage of a Syrian Air Force aircraft in Menagh Military Airbase, February 2016

In spite of occasional denials, the rebel coalition has always been closely allied with the Syrian Kurdish People's Protection Units (YPG). The coalition was therefore met with distrust by more Islamist rebel factions, and became embroiled in open conflict with hard-line Islamists, such as al-Qaeda's al-Nusra Front.

Further deepening bonds with the YPG and other anti-ISIL forces, the Army of Revolutionaries co-established the Syrian Democratic Forces in October 2015. Originally, only the eastern Syria branch of the group was part of the SDF. On 17 November 2015, 15 rebel groups led by the Army of Revolutionaries established the SDF's branch in Aleppo and Idlib. Subsequently, its constituents became involved in clashes with the al-Nusra Front, Ahrar al-Sham and Islamist groups of the Fatah Halab and the Mare' Operations Room. During the battles, two fighters of Jaysh al-Thuwar were beheaded by al-Nusra. According to observers, it therefore withdrew most of its presence from other rebel-held areas, refocusing on the Syrian Democratic Forces' joint front lines.

On 21 January 2017, the Army of Revolutionaries released 74 prisoners of war from rival rebel forces. On 11 March 2017, after negotiations between the Syrian National Democratic Alliance, the political council of Idlib, and the Army of Revolutionaries, a second batch of 80 prisoners were released.

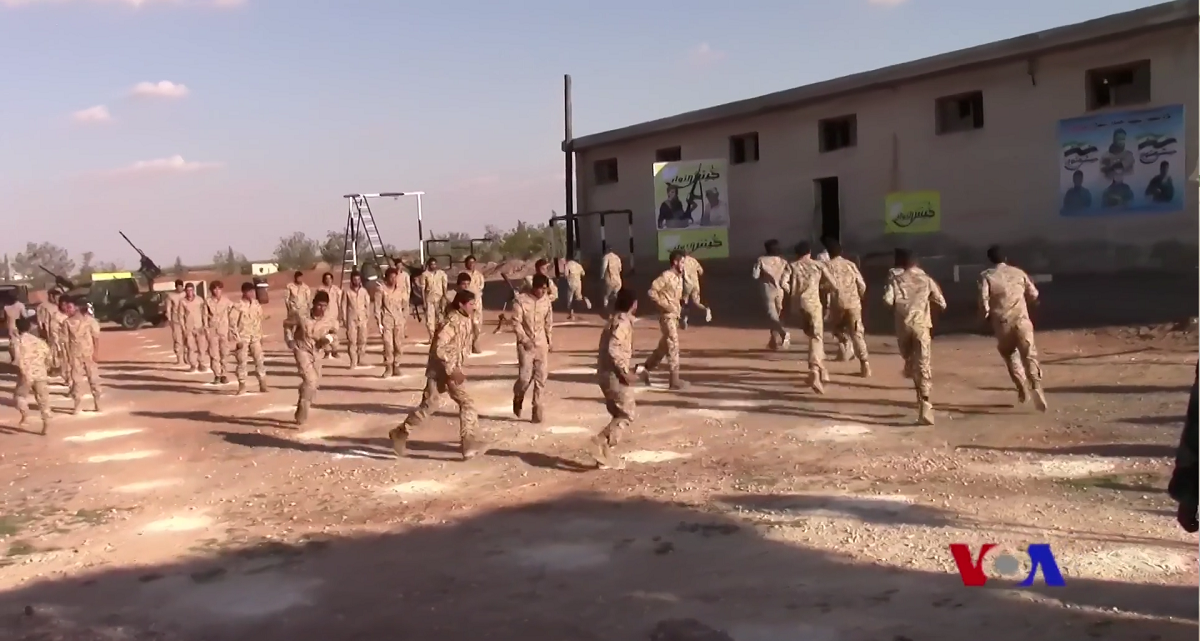
Training camp of the Army of Revolutionaries in October 2017

On 30 July 2017, the group announced that it would allow additional women to join its ranks, though its member group the Kurdish Front already recruit women into their units.

In early August, former Army of Revolutionaries commander Wissi Hijazi ("Abu Uday Menagh"), who had previously helped to capture Menagh and Menagh Military Airbase during the Northern Aleppo offensive (February 2016) and been involved in a scandal surrounding a Kurdish girl, defected to the TFSA's Sultan Murad Division. He cited his opposition to alleged cooperation between the government and the SDF as reason for this move. His defection was not accepted, however, by the Revolutionary Council of Menagh (another TFSA faction), which declared its intention to have him killed. In response, the Army of Revolutionaries issued a statement claiming that Hijazi was already expelled from the group in May 2016.

In an interview on 28 August 2017, Ahmed Sultan, leading commander of the Army of Revolutionaries, denied any coordination between his group and the Syrian Elite Forces, although both groups are participating in the Battle of Raqqa. During the interview, Sultan also stated that the Army of Revolutionaries was ready to fight in Deir ez-Zor against ISIL and in Idlib against al-Qaeda. In January 2018, the Army of Revolutionaries declared that it would fight with the YPG/YPJ against Operation Olive Branch.

== Current and former groups ==
=== Current ===
This is a list of current and former Jaysh al-Thuwar groups:

- Kurdish Front
  - Tel Rifaat Revolutionaries Battalion
  - Shahba Women's Front
- Northern Sun Battalion
- 99th Infantry Brigade (former member of the Syrian Revolutionaries Front)
- 455th Special Tasks Brigade
- Martyr Yusuf al-Quzhul Company
- Southern Storm Company
- Eagles of the Sunnah Company
- Truthful Promise Company
- Fighters for Justice Company
- Seljuk Brigade (former member of the Suleyman Shah Brigade)
- Division 30 remnants
- A unit of the Mountain Hawks Brigade consisting of 50 fighters stationed in the town of Deir Jamal defected to the Army of Revolutionaries during the Northern Aleppo offensive (February 2016), although its commander was soon after captured by another rebel group.
- Seljuk Brigade
  - Hammam Turkmen Martyrs Brigade
- Martyr Qasim Areef Battalion
- Homs Commandos Brigade
- Tribal Forces
- Revolutionary Shield Brigade

=== Former ===
- 777th Regiment (former member of the Farouq Brigades)
- Sultan Selim Brigade (part of the Syrian Turkmen Brigades)
- Homs Revolutionary Union (left in February 2016, joined the Sultan Murad Division in 2017)
- Atarib Martyrs Brigade (left to join the Army of Mujahideen in May 2016, former component of the Hazm Movement and Farouq Brigades)
- Descendants of Othman Brigade (left to join the Houla Operations Room in October 2015)
- Revolutionary Fedayeen Movement (left to join the Jaysh al-Nasr operations room in August 2015, left Jaysh al-Nasr when it became a unified group in October 2015)
- Brigade 313 – Free Men of Aqrab (left to join the Houla Operations Room in October 2015)
- al-Qa'qa' Brigade (former member of the Syrian Revolutionaries Front, later left and was renamed to the Northern Democratic Brigade in 2016)

== Flag ==
Whilst the Army of Revolutionaries uses the same Syrian independence flag used by many other opposition groups, the group also uses its own more specific Army of Revolutionaries flag, as well as the flag of the Syrian Democratic Forces. Since 2017, it also used a new flag, based on the flag of the SDF.

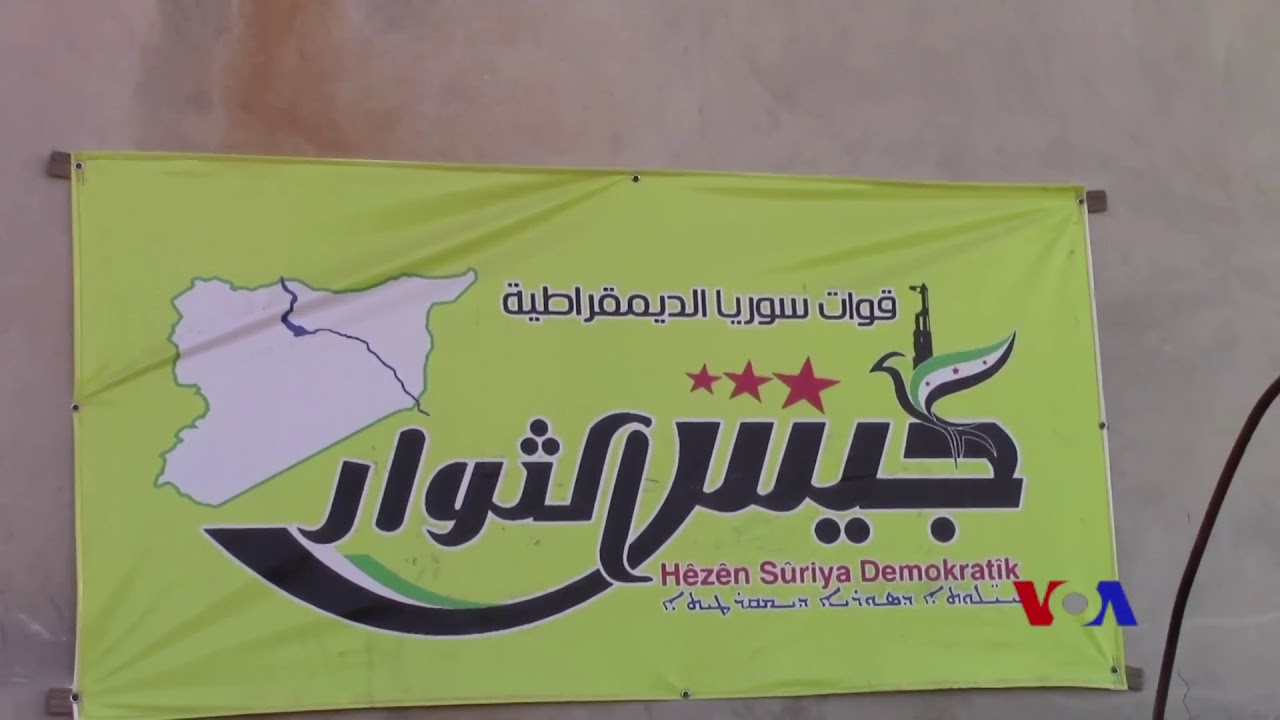

== See also ==
- List of armed groups in the Syrian Civil War
- Liwa Thuwar al-Raqqa
