= Liwa Ahrar Souriya =

Group of Syrian rebel fighters

Free Men of Syria Brigade Liwa Ahrar Souriya
- Arabic: لواء أحرار سورية
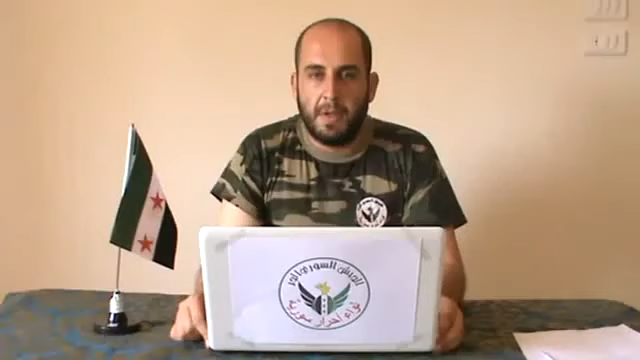
- Ali Belo, commander of Liwa Ahrar Souriya until September 2013
- Leaders: Ahmad Afash; Mahmoud Afash; Ali Belo; Capt. Mamon Kalzi; Abu Layla (Manbij area field commander, 2012–13); Muhammad Abu Adel (Manbij commander, 2013–14)
- Dates active: February 2012 — Unknown
- Groups: Anadan Brigade; Arab Spring Brigades; Kurdish Front (former, 2013)
- Headquarters: Anadan and Azaz, Aleppo Governorate, Syria
- Active regions: Aleppo Governorate and Raqqa Governorate, Syria
- Ideology: Syrian nationalism
- Size: 2,000–2,500 (self-claim, 2013); 500 (2012)
- Part of: (Syrian opposition) Free Syrian Army; 16th Division (2013); Mare' Operations Room (2014–2016); Hamza Division (2016); Northern Brigade (unclear); Revolutionary Knights Brigade (unclear)
- Wars: Syrian civil war

The Free Men of Syria Brigade or the Free Syrian Brigade (Arabic: لواء أحرار سورية, romanized: Liwa Ahrar Souriya) was a group of Syrian rebel fighters affiliated with the Free Syrian Army active during the Syrian civil war, mainly around Aleppo.

== Funding ==
The group received funding from sources in Saudi Arabia. By 2013, it required 2 million Turkish liras (equivalent of $568,456.42) daily to operate. The group also stole money and looted from warehouses in the al-Layramoun district of Aleppo and Kafr Hamrah. It also conducted kidnapping for large amounts of ransom.

== History ==
Liwa Shuhada Anadan changed its name to Liwa Ahrar Souriya on 11 September 2012 after it captured several tanks and BMPs.

The group was originally formed as the Free Anadan Brigade by Ahmad Afash, a rebel from the Khalidiya district of Aleppo. It fielded 500 fighters by mid-2012 and took part in the Battle of Anadan in July 2012. After the battle, the group captured several tanks from the Syrian Army and gained influence as well as additional fighters, and changed its name to the Free Syrian Brigade, or Liwa Ahrar Souriya.

In late October 2012, amid infighting between the People's Protection Units and other rebel groups in Aleppo, the Free Syrian Brigade abducted 120 Kurdish civilians in the area. After negotiations between the Democratic Union Party and FSA groups, they were released.

In December 2012 the group signed a declaration that rejected the authority of the National Coalition for Syrian Revolutionary and Opposition Forces and proposed to establish an Islamic state, although its leader later withdrew from the declaration and recognized the National Coalition.

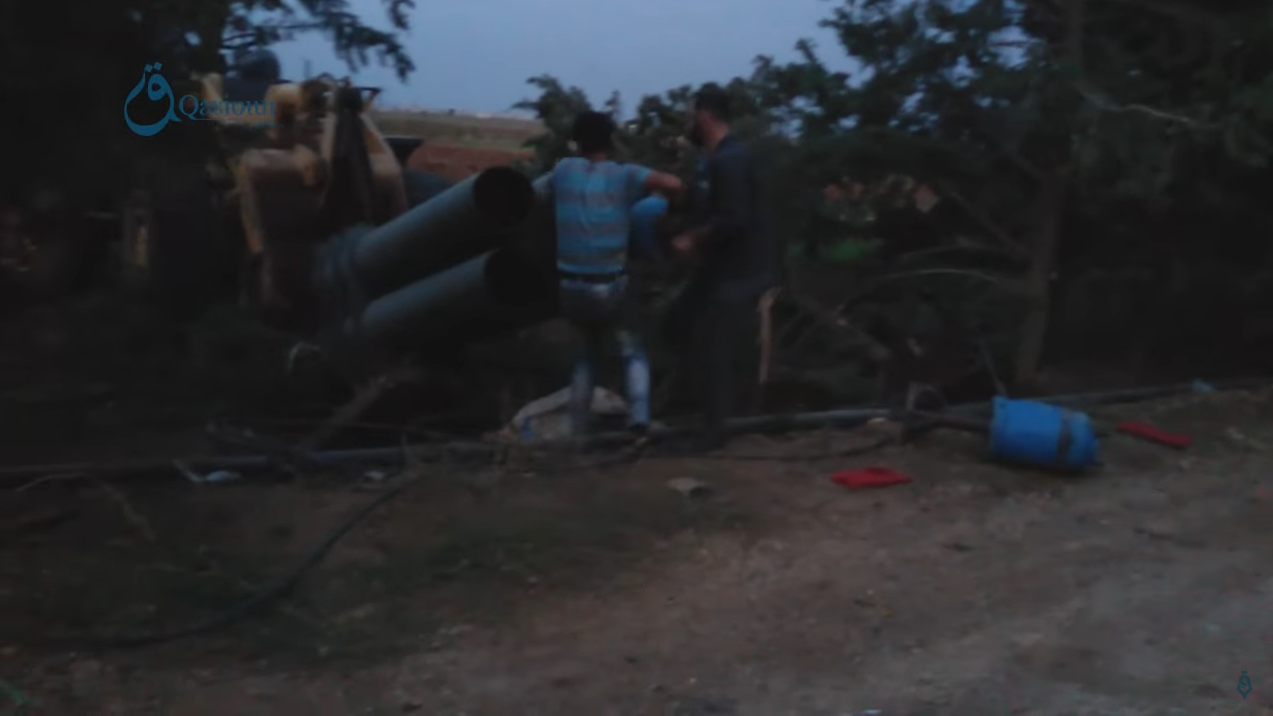
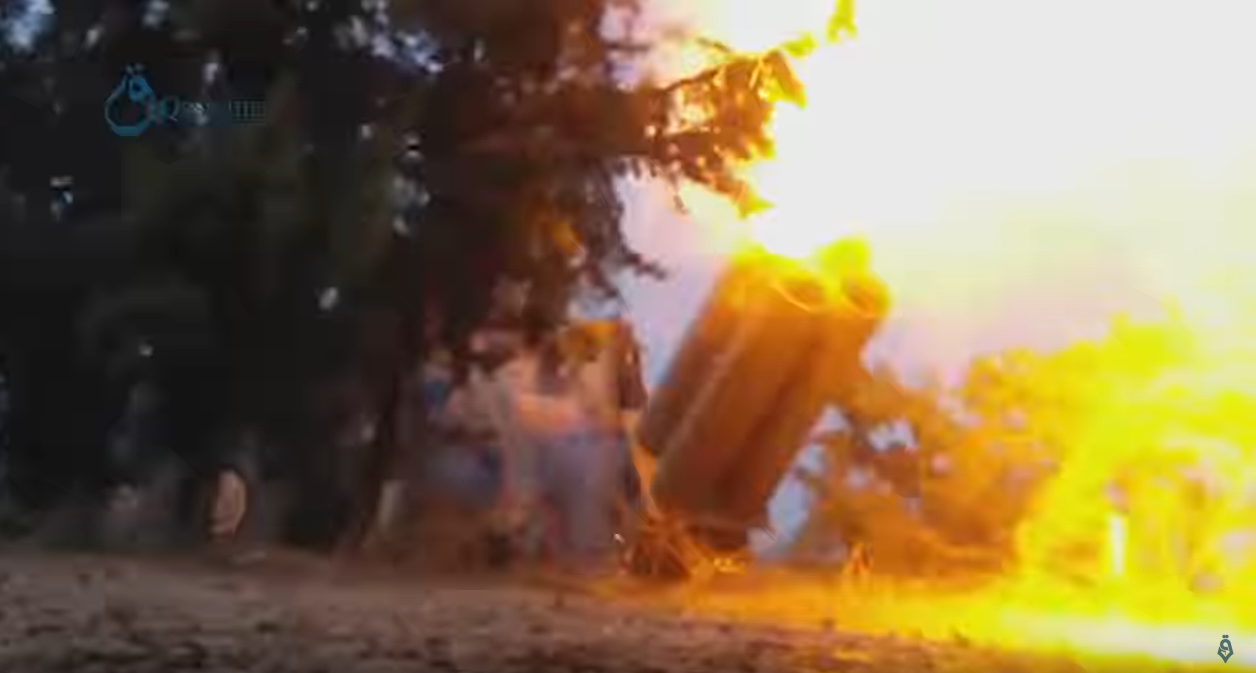
Free Syrian Brigade fighters load (top) and fire (bottom) improvised artillery during a battle with ISIL forces in northern Aleppo in November 2015.

In September 2013, the Free Syrian Brigade became a founding member group of the 16th Division. Another group in the 16th Division was the Badr Martyrs Brigade, led by Khaled Hayani. Tensions brewed between Hayani and Ahmad Afash after the Badr Martyrs Brigade clashed with the Islamic State of Iraq and the Levant in October 2013. The Free Syrian Brigade left the 16th Division in November 2013 and redeployed its fighters away from the frontlines with ISIL and toward the frontlines against the Syrian Army. The group was known to be corrupt. Among other things he did to receive money, Ahmad Afash confiscated alcohol to sell them to merchants outside Aleppo. During this time, he also acquired a Mercedes-Benz S-Class.

At the end of 2013 and the beginning of 2014, infighting between ISIL and other rebel groups escalated in northern Syria. During the infighting, Ahmad Afash fled to Turkey and rented a hotel in Mersin. During his stay in Turkey, Afash became a drug addict and was once hospitalized. Meanwhile, in Syria, the Free Syrian Brigade held out in Aleppo and its surrounding areas.

On 19 May 2014, the Free Syrian Brigade and the al-Nusra Front detonated a tunnel bomb in the Ancient City of Aleppo which destroyed a historic palace, which at the time was used by the Syrian Army as a military headquarter.

In October 2015, during the Russian military intervention in Syria, the Free Syrian Brigade headquarters in the northern Aleppo Governorate was hit by a Russian airstrike which killed 7 of its fighters.

Since November 2015, the group has participated in the shelling of Aleppo's Sheikh Maqsood neighborhood, controlled by the People's Protection Units as part of the Syrian Democratic Forces.

In September 2016, the Free Syrian Brigade joined the Hamza Division. 2 months later, on 15 November 2016, it left the Hamza Division and joined the Nour al-Din al-Zenki Movement's north Aleppo branch, whom they in turned joined the Sham Legion's north Aleppo branch. They in turn dissolved to form the Revolutionary Knights Brigade, which was a part of the Northern Brigade that left the Sham Legion on 30 May 2017, though their current membership was unclear, and it was also unclear if they are still active.

== See also ==
- List of armed groups in the Syrian Civil War

== Bibliography ==
- Report of the independent international commission of inquiry on the Syrian Arab Republic (PDF). Geneva: UNHRC. 2013.
