= Kurdish Front =

Syrian Kurdish Rebel Group

- جبهة الأكراد; Jabhat al-Akrād
- Logo of Jabhat al-Akrad since August 2016
- Leaders: Alaa Ajabu (nom de guerre Abu Satif) †; Haji Ahmed Kurdi; Salah Ajabu; Abu Steyf; Ali Çîçek; Khalid Abdo; Jawan Abu Hamza; Rustam Akrad †; Abu Layla (2013–14); Muhammad Abu Adel (2013–14)
- Dates active: 22 January 2013 – present
- Groups: Shahba Women's Forces; Tell Aran Revolutionaries Battalion; Victory Battalion (2013)
- Active regions: Aleppo Governorate; Raqqa Governorate
- Ideology: Pluralist democracy Kurdish interests Democratic socialism Federalism; Factions: Democratic confederalism Communalism
- Size: Over 3,000
- Part of: Free Syrian Brigade (January–March 2013); Revolutionary Military Council of Aleppo Governorate (March–August 2013); Euphrates Volcano (2014–15); Army of Revolutionaries (2015–present); Syrian Democratic Forces (2015–present)
- Wars: the Syrian Civil War
- Website: http://jabhetakrad.com/

The Kurdish Front (Arabic: جبهة الأكراد, transliterated: Jabhat al-Akrād; Kurdish: Eniya Kurdan, former full name: لواء جبهة الأكراد لنصرة شعبنا السوري Liwa' Jabhat al-'Akrād an-Nuṣrah Shaʿbnā al-Sūrī, "Brigade of the Kurdish Front to Support Our Syrian People") is a predominantly Kurdish Syrian rebel faction participating in the Syrian Civil War.

The Kurdish Front operates in Kurdish and ethnically mixed areas in northern Syria, such as the Sheikh Maqsood and Ashrafiyeh districts of Aleppo city, Afrin Canton, the Shahba region, and the northern Raqqa Governorate. It also fought as part of Fatah Halab in the Bustan al-Pasha, Haidariya, and Handarat districts of Aleppo city until November 2015, when Fatah Halab declared war on the Army of Revolutionaries.

== Ideology ==
During an interview with the commander of the group, Haji Ahmed Kurdi, in April 2014, he stated that the Kurdish Front is part of a "project for a democratic Syria". The goal of the group is to establish a pluralist democracy in Syria, where "every people can live freely, those of different faiths can find their own space to live, and all constitutional rights will be guaranteed".

In a May 2015 interview with Ahmed Barakal, another commander of the group, Barakal said that his group received support from "Western and Gulf sources", that the Kurdish Front was not affiliated with any political party, and that "we do not see the National Coalition as our representative."

== History ==
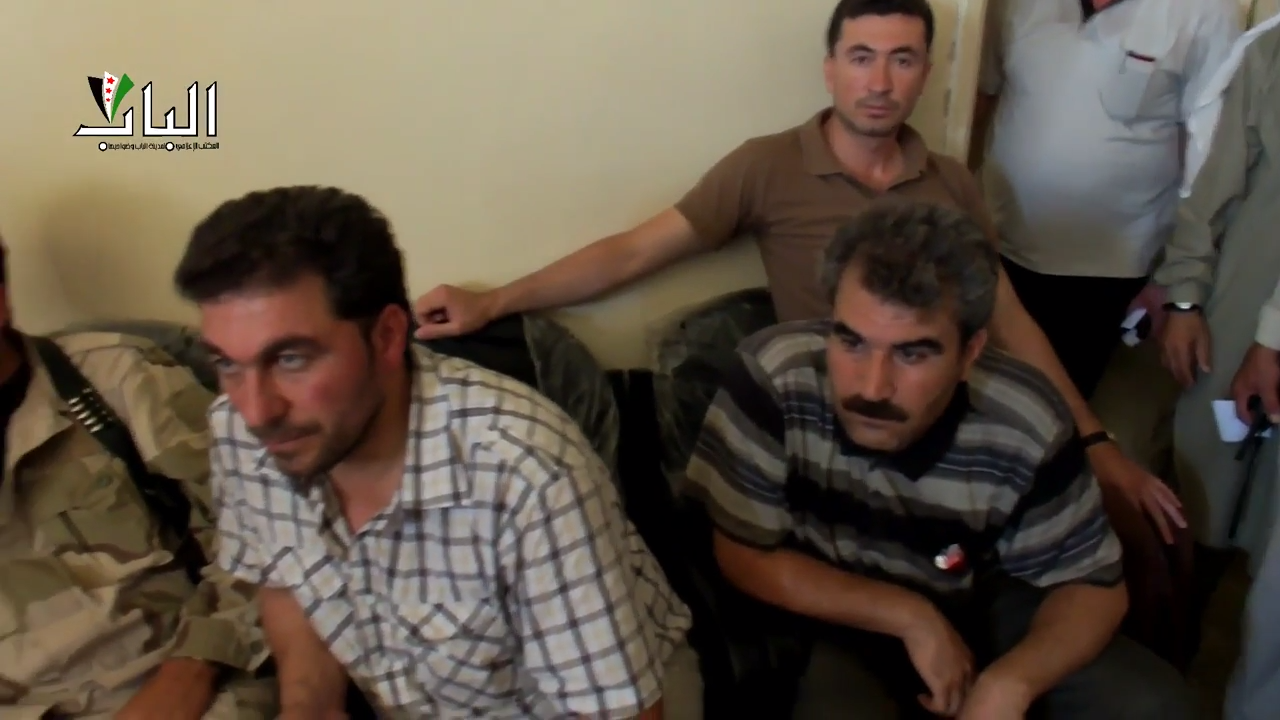
Muhammad Mustafa "Abu Adel" (left) and Shervan Derwish (right), two commanders of the Kurdish Front, in Qabasin during the signing of an agreement with other rebel groups in July 2013

The Kurdish Front Brigade was originally formed on 22 January 2013 as a subgroup of the Free Syrian Brigade in the Raqqa Governorate, affiliated with the Free Syrian Army. It was set up by Kurdish, Arab, and Turkmen fighters, some of whom had defected from the Syrian Army, from the Raqqa, Aleppo, Latakia, Hama, and Homs governorates. From the outset, the group maintained ties with the Democratic Union Party (PYD), including military coordination with its armed wing, the People's Protection Units (YPG). Some members of the Kurdish Democratic Progressive Party also joined the Kurdish Front. After the Kurdish Front was formed, the influence of other Kurdish FSA groups such as the Azadî Battalion and the Saladin Ayubi Brigade began to decline.

In early 2013, the Kurdish Front participated in the Siege of Menagh Air Base along with other rebel groups. On 28 May 2013, when several thousand FSA and jihadist rebels moved west to launch an attack on Kurdish fighters of the YPG in the Afrin region, the group withdrew its participation in the siege in order to join forces with the YPG to repel the attack on Afrin.

The Kurdish Front joined the Revolutionary Military Council of Aleppo Governorate, led by Abdul Jabbar al-Oqaidi, on 7 March 2013. It was subsequently expelled from the council on 15 August, amid intensifying conflict between the Kurdish Front and its YPG ally on one side and Sunni Islamist rebel groups, including the military council, the al-Nusra Front and the Islamic State of Iraq and the Levant (ISIL), on the other.

During the Battle of Tell Abyad in July 2013, the al-Nusra Front and the Islamic State of Iraq and the Levant (ISIL) captured the border town of Tell Abyad from the Kurdish Front and YPG.

In early 2014, following several months of inactivity, the Kurdish Front re-emerged to collaborate with other Free Syrian Army groups and other rebel factions in attacks on ISIL. During the fighting with ISIL, on 17 February, Alaa Ajabu, Kurdish Front general commander also known by his nom de guerre Abu Satif, was killed in action. On 28 February, ISIL withdrew from the strategic border town of Azaz, which was then taken by the Kurdish Front, the Northern Storm Brigade, and al-Tawhid Brigade. The Kurdish Front briefly joined the Dawn of Freedom Brigades in March.

In July 2014, the Kurdish Front and 10 other groups threatened to leave the frontlines in the Aleppo and Raqqa governorates if they are not aided by other rebels. The Kurdish Front, as part of Euphrates Volcano, re-entered the Raqqa province after they broke the Siege of Kobanî in February 2015. It also cooperated with the Levant Front and other groups in an attempt to advance into al-Bab and Jarabulus.

=== Army of Revolutionaries and Syrian Democratic Forces ===
On 3 May 2015, some of the former members of the northern branches of the Hazzm Movement, including the Atarib Martyrs Brigade, and the Syrian Revolutionaries Front along with the Kurdish Front, the Dawn of Freedom Brigades main component group the Northern Sun Battalion (making the Dawn of Freedom Brigades defunct in the process) and smaller FSA groups formed the Army of Revolutionaries. Many of the northern members of the Syrian Revolutionaries Front and Hazzm Movement also joined the Levant Front.

On 8 June 2016, the Kurdish Front established an all-female unit called the Shahba Women's Protection Front.

In August 2016, the Kurdish Front changed their logo, removing the Syrian independence flag in the process, though they kept the Arabic text. This represents the 4th logo the group has had. Their logos for their male and female units are different from the new main logo, as they sometimes employed Kurdish text. Their male unit is referred to in Kurdish as Hêzên Eniya Kurdan (HJK) and their female unit as Hêzên Jinên Kurdan (HEK).

On 6 October 2017, the first regiment of the Kurdish Front was formed in the Shahba region, consisting of 236 fighters.

== See also ==
- List of armed groups in the Syrian Civil War
- Idlib Revolutionaries Brigade
