= Raqqa campaign (2016–2017) order of battle =

Military unit

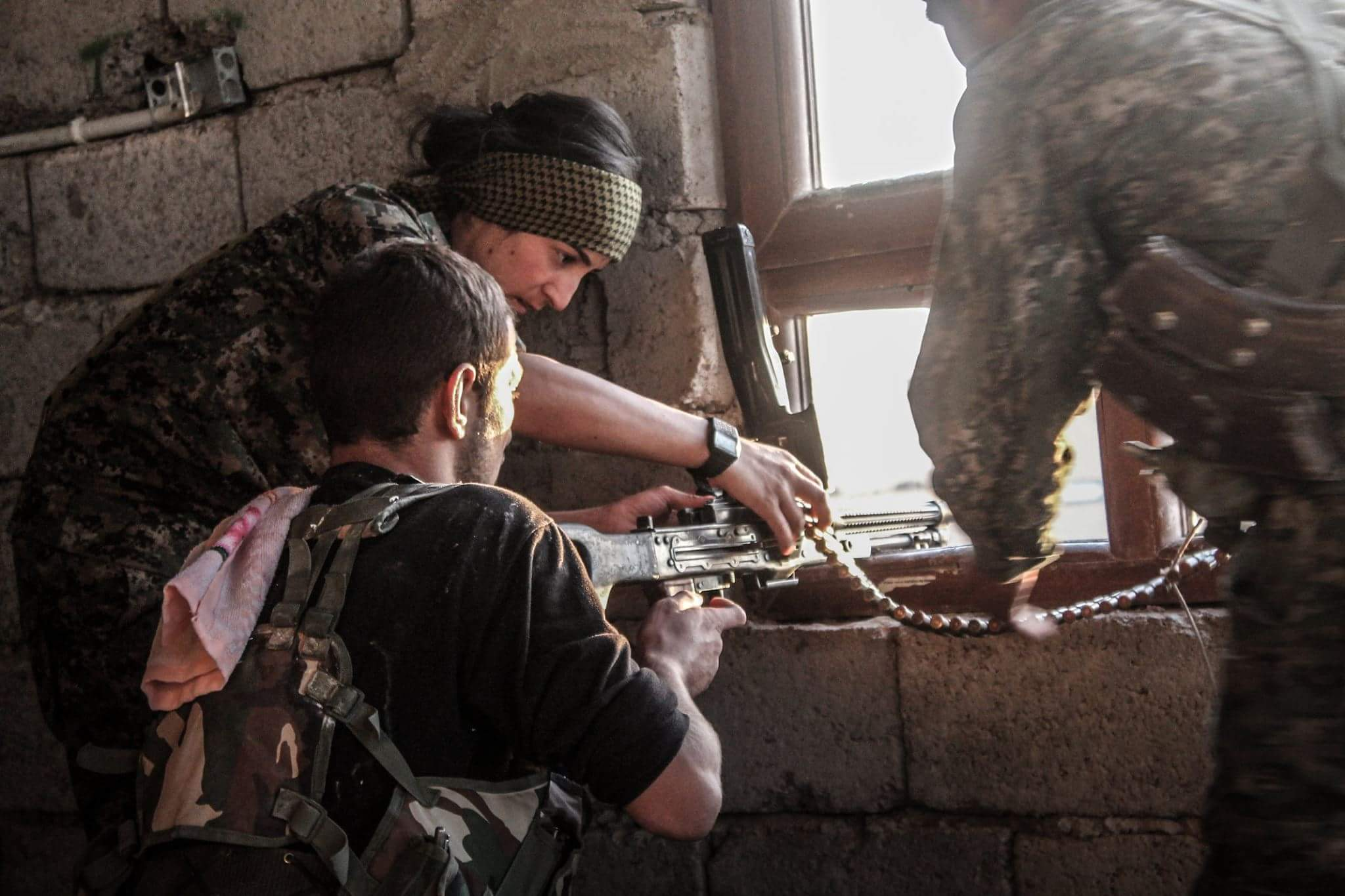
Syrian Democratic Forces fighters in combat during the Raqqa campaign (2016–2017).

In course of the Raqqa campaign (2016–2017), an international coalition, primarily composed of the Syrian Democratic Forces and CJTF–OIR, captured the Raqqa Governorate from the Islamic State, which had declared Raqqa city the capital of its self-proclaimed caliphate.

== Anti-ISIL forces ==
=== Syrian Democratic Forces and integrated units ===
SDF general headquarters - Gen. Mazlum Kobane (chief commander of the SDF), Rojda Felat (leading operations commander), Sipan Hamo (YPG chief commander), Cihan Shekh Ahmed (spokeswoman), Col. Talal Silo (spokesman), Brig. Gen. Hussam Awak (high-ranking commander)

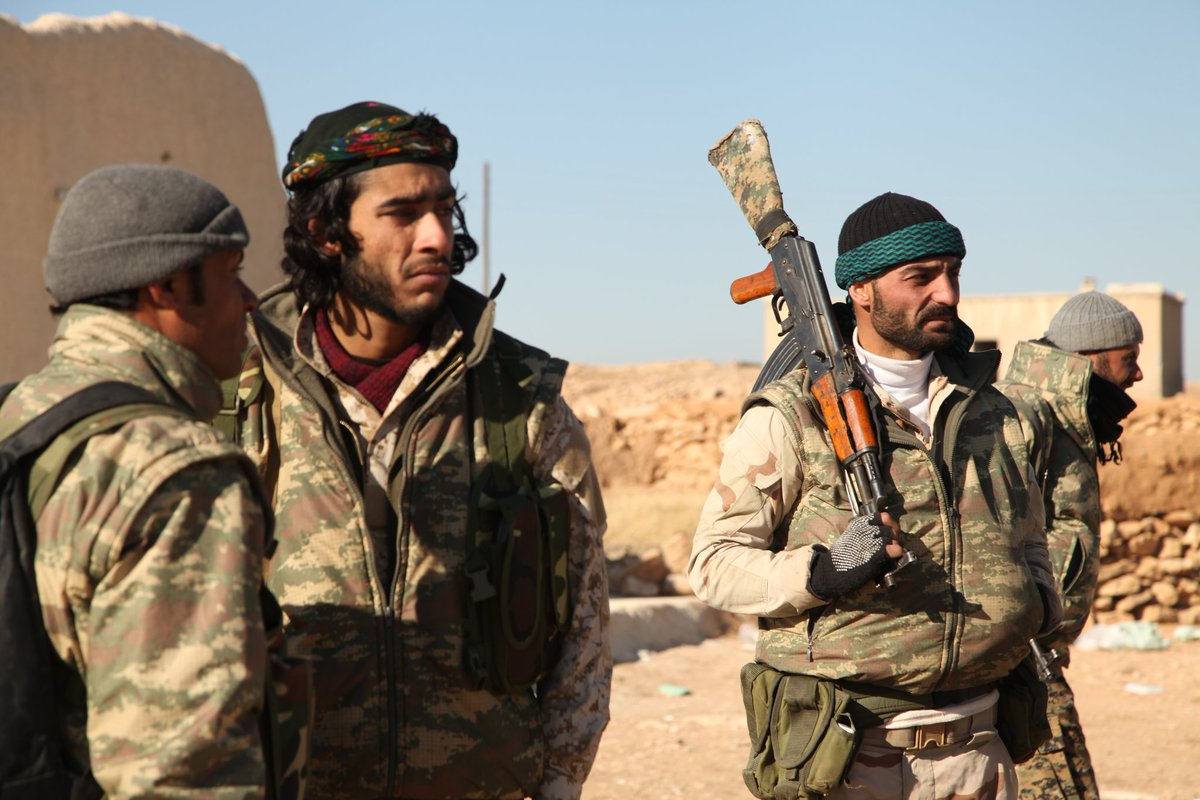
Kurdish YPG fighters during the offensive on 24 December 2016.

- People's Protection Units (YPG), under command of Sipan Hemo
  - YPG International Battalion, led by Karim Franceschi
  - Kobanî Brigade, led by Shevgar Himo
  - Units from Afrin Canton
  - Many other sub-units, led by Murat Amed, Merdali Süleymanovun (alias "Çiya Rûs", killed on 23 April 2017), and various other commanders (of which at least 7 were killed by 14 March 2017)
  - PKK units (suspected by observers)
  - Western leftist/anarchist YPG volunteers (c. 75+) (Note: These are volunteers who have fully joined the YPG but aren't a part of the YPG International Battalion, and are not members of any other units such as the "International Freedom Battalion" or the "YPG International Battalion".)
  - Non-leftist international volunteers
- Women's Protection Units (YPJ), under command of Rojda Felat
  - Units from Afrin Canton
  - Many other sub-units, commanded by Diljin Kobani, Clara Raqqa, Zagros Qamishlo, and others
- Anti-Terror Units (YAT)
- Syriac Military Council (MFS), under command of Kino Gabriel
  - Bethnahrain Women's Protection Forces
  - International volunteers
- Khabour Guards (since 30 July 2017, Battle of Raqqa)
  - Martyr Joel Hanna group
- Nattoreh, under command of Robert Ichou
- (Syrian opposition) Raqqa Hawks Brigade
  - Ghanim group, under command of Fayad Ghanim (until 26 Aug. 2017) (Note: The Ghanim group was forcibly disbanded by the SDF after accusations that they worked with the government. Several members of the group, including Fayad Ghanim, then fled into areas held by the Syrian Army.)
  - Northern Union, under command of Abu Yamen al-Meko (until 22 Feb. 2017) (Note: After the Northern Union declared its loyalty to the Assad government on 20 February, it was destroyed by Jabhat Thuwar al-Raqqa two days later during SDF infighting.)
  - Martyr Tasleem Jimmo Brigade, under command of Aboud al-Hafez
  - Other sub-units, led by Abu Saleh al-Hindawi, Abu Mustafa, and others

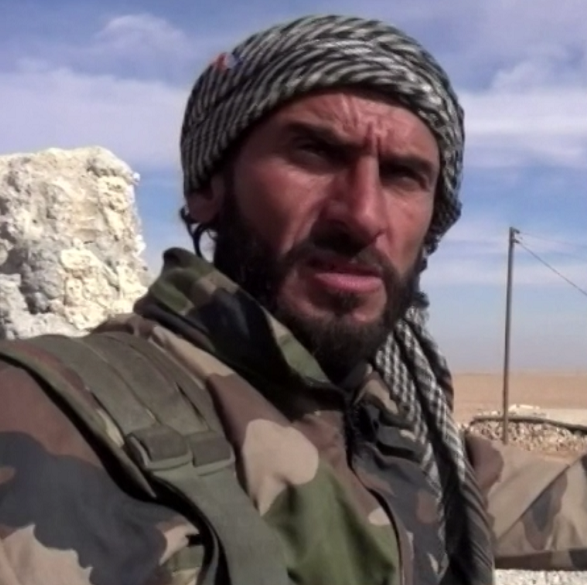
Abu Yazan, commander of the Tell Abyad Revolutionaries Brigade, a SDF member group.

- (Syrian opposition) Tell Abyad Revolutionaries Brigade, under command of Abu Yazan
- (Syrian opposition) Raqqa Martyrs Brigade, under command of Abu Sayaf
- (Syrian opposition) Liberation Brigade
- (Syrian opposition) Free Raqqa Brigade, under command of Abu Wael
- Jazeera Knights
- Jabhat Thuwar al-Raqqa (since 10 December 2016 - second phase), under command of Abu Issa
  - Various sub-units, led by Capt. Abu al-Qasim al-Shammari, (Note: Abu al-Qasim al-Shammari was reportedly captured by the Raqqa Hawks Brigade during alleged SDF infighting.) Farhan Abu Asker, Abdullah al-Helu, and others

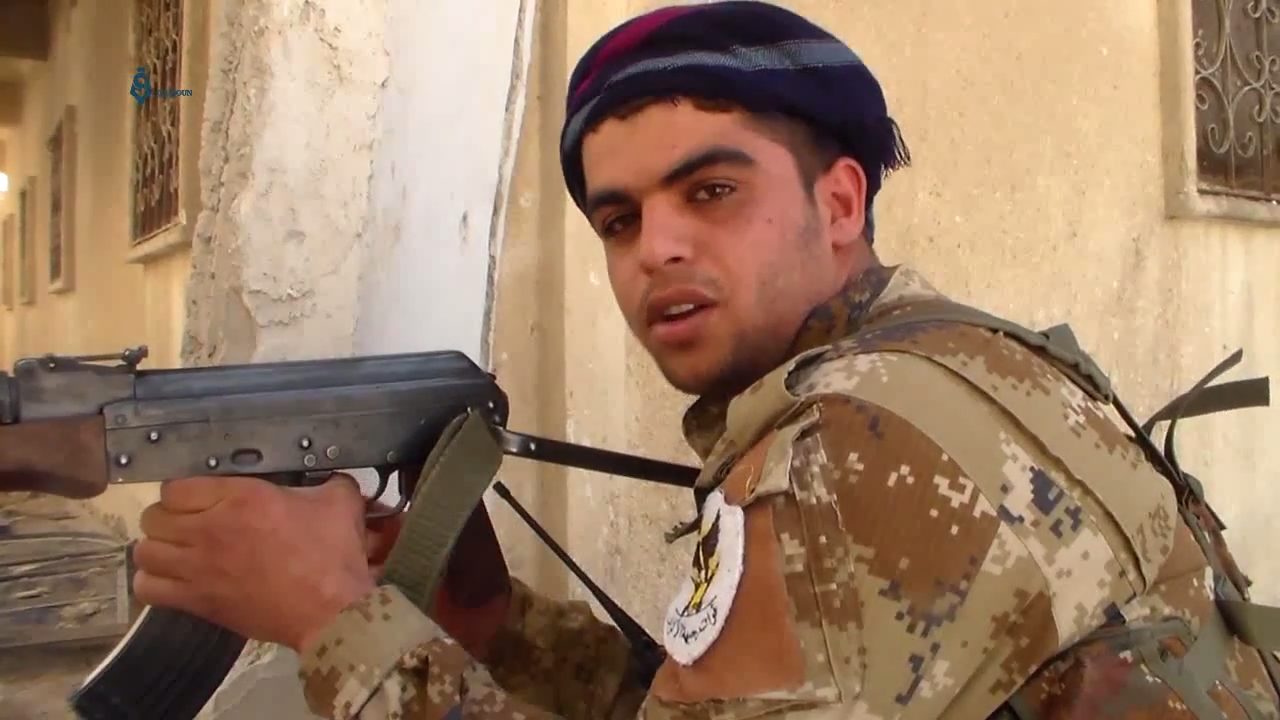
A Kurdish Front fighter during the Battle of Raqqa in June 2017.

- Army of Revolutionaries, under the command of Ahmad Sultan
  - Kurdish Front, under the commander of Ali Çiçek (since 6 June 2017, Battle of Raqqa)
  - Seljuk Brigade (since 6 June 2017, Battle of Raqqa)
    - Hammam Turkmen Martyrs Brigade
  - Tribal Forces (since 6 June 2017, Battle of Raqqa), under the command of Abu Raad Bakary
  - Homs Commandos Brigade (since 6 June 2017, Battle of Raqqa)
  - Martyr Qasim Areef Battalion
- Northern Democratic Brigade (since 6 June 2017, Battle of Raqqa)
- Manbij Military Council (since 17 April 2017), under the command of Muhammad Mustafa Ali, also known by his nom de guerre Abu Adel, since September 2017. The council was previously led by Adnan Abu Amjad until his death on 29 August 2017. The field commander of the council in Raqqa is Dilsuz Hashme.
  - Northern Sun Battalion, under command of Muhammad Mustafa Ali
    - Soldiers of the Two Holy Mosques Brigade
  - Euphrates Liberation Brigade, led by Ibrahim Semho
- Syria's Tomorrow Movement, under the official leadership of Ahmad Jarba
  - Elite Forces (since 10 December 2016 - second phase), commanded by Muhedi Jayila
    - Saadallah al-Jabiri Battalion, led by Muhammad Ramadan until his death on 16 March 2017
- Liwa Owais al-Qorani remnants
- Al-Sanadid Forces, under command of Bandar al-Humaydi

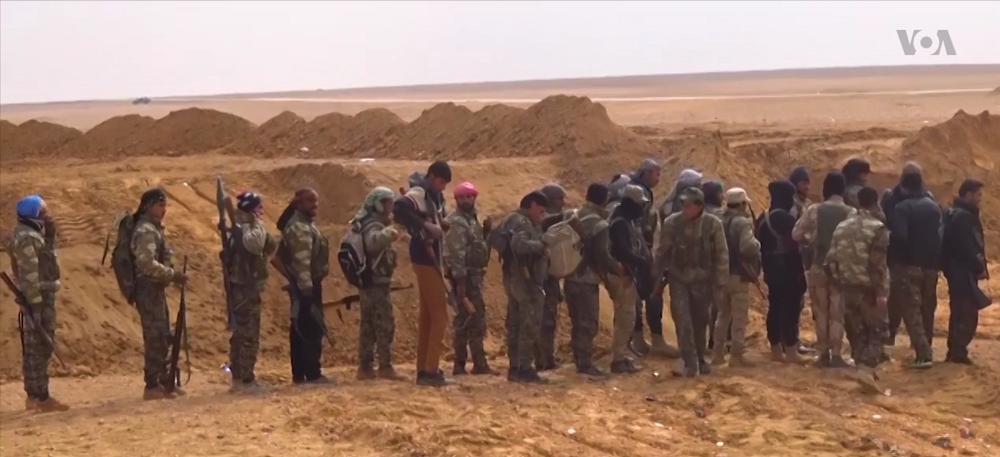
Deir ez-Zor Military Council fighters during the offensive.

- Deir ez-Zor Military Council (since 10 December 2016 - second phase), under command of Ahmad Abu Khoula
  - Sub-units led by Khalid Awad (killed on 22 February), and others
- Raqqa Regiment, led by Hassan Khalil
- Northern Brigade faction, led by Mihemed Al Musa (since 4 September 2017)
- Local pro-SDF tribes and militias

Self-Defense Forces (HXP) - Siyamend Welat (chief commander of HXP)

- Elements of the 3rd Brigade

Police

- Jazira Canton Asayish units
  - SWAT units (HAT)
- Raqqa Internal Security Forces , led by Edrees Hamo and others

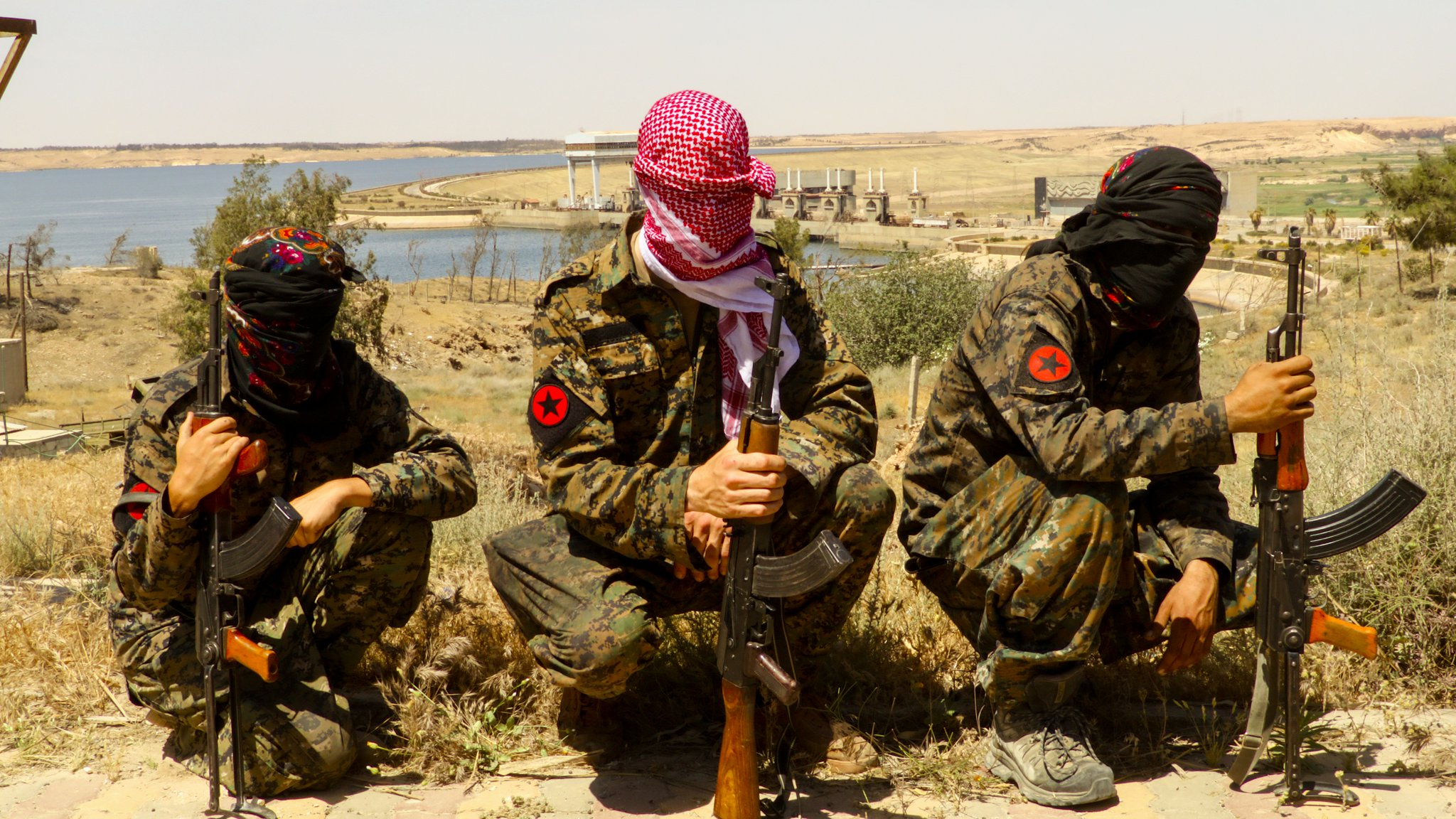
IRPGF fighters during the campaign.

International Freedom Battalion

- MLKP
  - MLKP/KKÖ
- United Freedom Forces
  - Revolutionary Communard Party, led by Ulaş Bayraktaroğlu (killed in May 2017)
  - THKP-C/MLSPB
- TKP/ML TİKKO, led by Nubar Ozanyan (killed in August 2017)
- Bob Crow Brigade
- International Revolutionary People's Guerrilla Forces (IRPGF)
  - TQILA (since 24 July 2017)
- RUIS

Sinjar Resistance Units (since July 2017)
Êzîdxan Women's Units (since July 2017),

Iraqi Kurdistan

- PUK Peshmerga Counterterrorism Group

=== CJTF–OIR ===
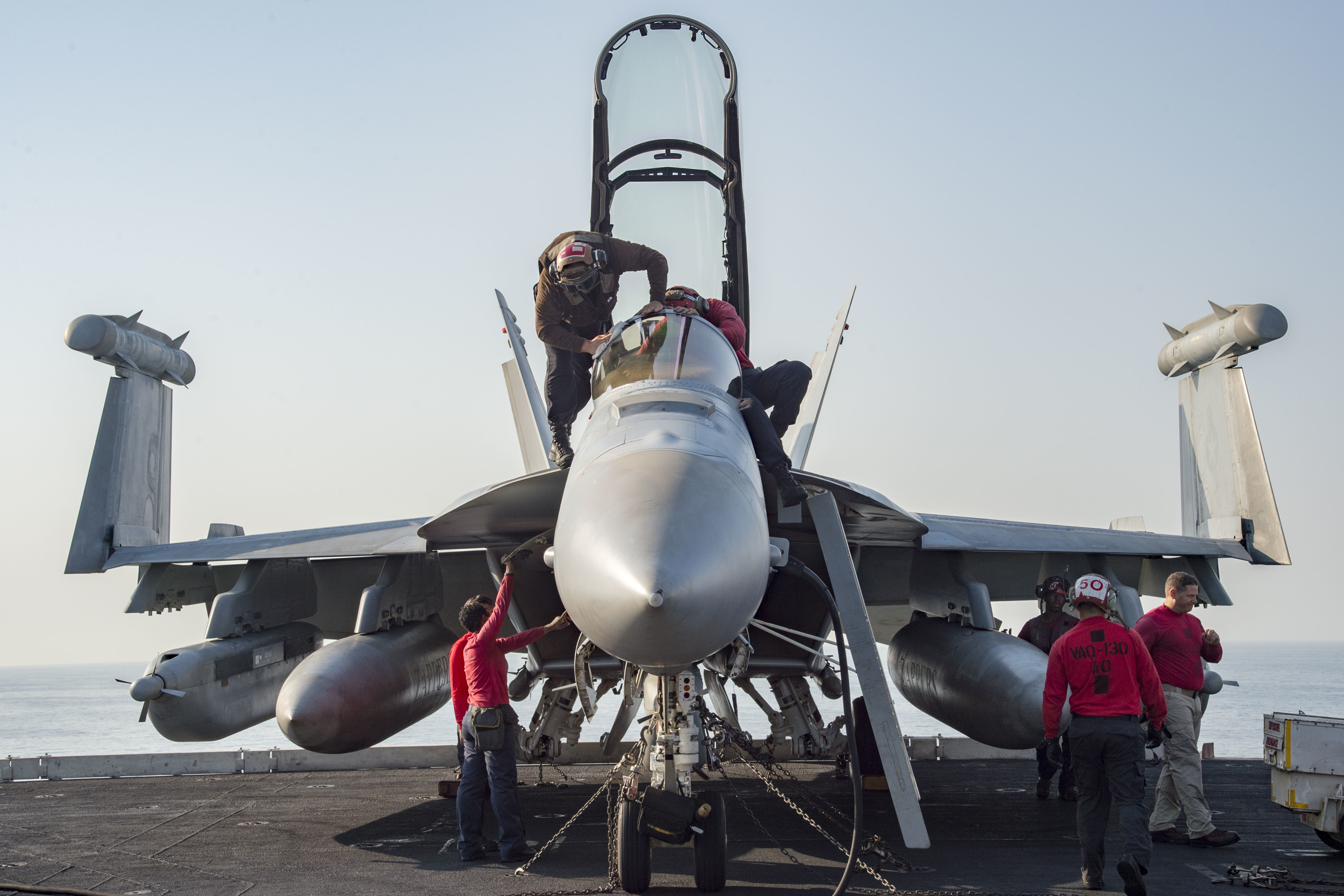
US Navy sailors conduct pre-flight inspections on a Boeing EA-18G Growler that participates in Operation Inherent Resolve.

CJTF–OIR general headquarters - Maj. Gen. John W. Brennan (chief commander), Brig. Gen. Karl Harris (deputy commander)

- United States Armed Forces, under the command of CENTCOM, which is led by Kenneth F. McKenzie
  - United States Air Force
    - United States Air Force Combat Control Team
  - United States Navy
  - United States Marine Corps
    - 11th Marine Expeditionary Unit
      - 24th Marine Expeditionary Unit 1st Battalion, 4th Marines
  - United States special operations forces
    - 75th Ranger Regiment
    - 5th Special Forces Group

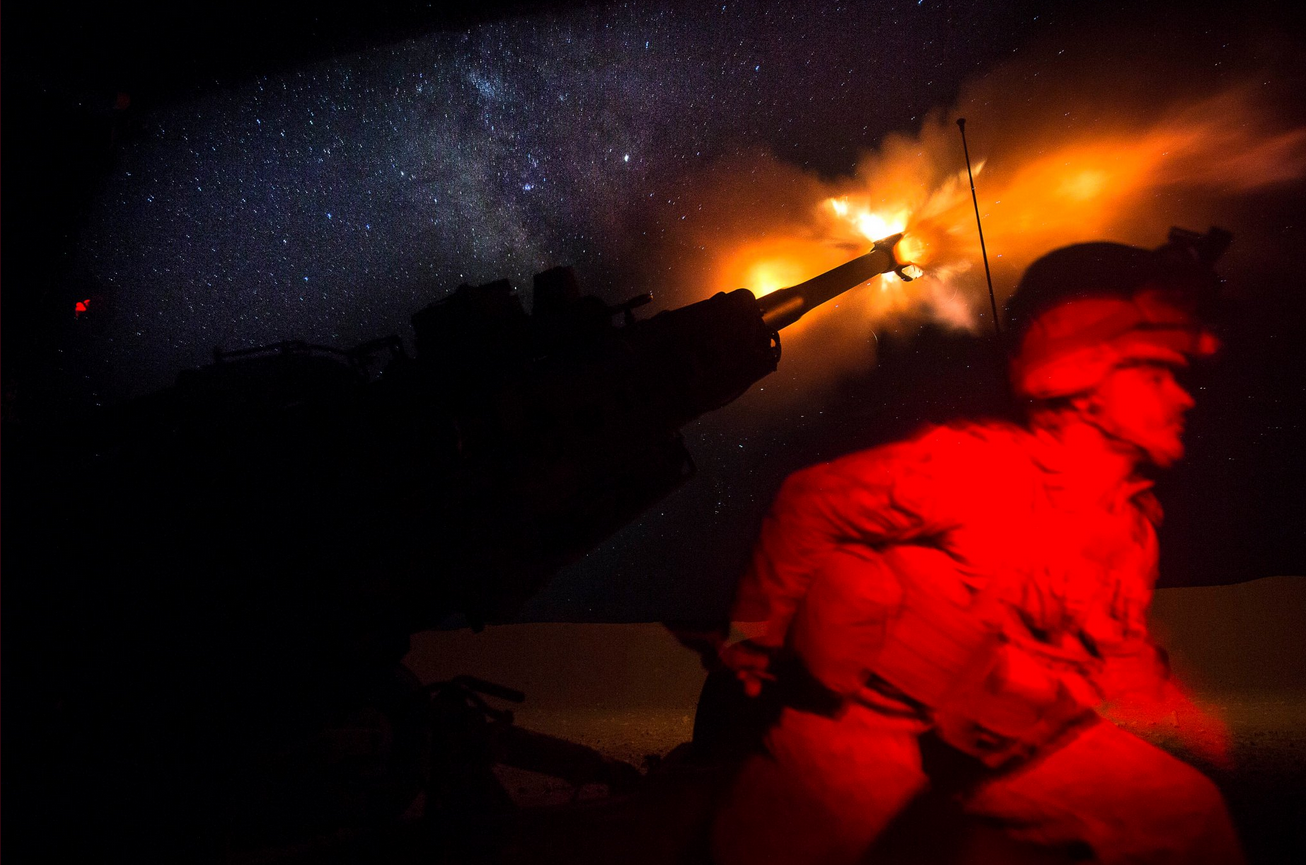
A United States Marine Corps artillery battery fires at ISIL positions during the Battle of Raqqa.

- (United Kingdom) British Armed Forces
  - Royal Air Force
  - British special forces
    - Special Air Service
- (France) French Armed Forces
  - French Air Force
  - French special forces
- (Germany) Bundeswehr
  - German Air Force

=== Syrian government and allies (co-belligerent) ===
- (Syria) Syrian Arab Army
  - Tiger Forces

Russia

- Russian Armed Forces
  - Russian Air Force

== Islamic State of Iraq and the Levant ==
The Black Standard of the Islamic State of Iraq and the Levant.

ISIL headquarters - Abu Bakr al-Baghdadi (self-proclaimed caliph and commander-in-chief); Abu Jandal al-Kuwaiti (leading commander for Raqqa defences 11–26 December); Abu Khattab al-Tunisi (ISIL high command member)

ISIL military forces ("Diwan al-Jund")

- Field army (organized into infantry, snipers, air defence, special forces, artillery forces, and the army of adversity)
  - Defences of Al-Thawrah, under command of Abu Saraqeb al-Maghribi
    - Sub-units in al-Thawrah District, led by various emirs, including Abu Umar al-Almani (killed on 25 March), Abu Zubeyir (killed on 2 April), and a Jordanian, who secretly worked as spy for CJTF–OIR until being extracted by US special forces in April
  - Defences of Raqqa city; the eastern city was under command of Abu Khattab al-Tunisi until his death on 10 June 2017. At least some of the ISIL holdouts in Raqqa by October 2017 were under the command of a man known as "Abu Osama".
    - Large number of foreign mujahideen (Chechens, Sudanese, Dagestanis, Moroccans, Algerians, Tunisians, Turks, Saudi Arabians, Georgians, Australians, Azerbaijanis, British)
    - Local pro-ISIL militias
  - Defences of al-Fakhikha, under command of a lower-ranking local commander/official, who was arrested by ISIL around 8 January on charges that he might have sold information to the Kurds or CJTF–OIR
  - Other sub-units, led by Abu Zur al-Tunisi and Bilal al-Shawwash (both deserted to Jabhat Fateh al-Sham around 7 December), Abo Hamza Riadiat (killed on 8 January), and others
- Caliphate Army (elite forces)
  - Katibah Nusantara elements, led by Zainuri Kamaruddin until his death on 13 January
  - Rapid Response Battalion, personally led by Abu Jandal al-Kuwaiti until his death
- Caliphate Cubs (child soldiers)
  - Abu Ubada al-Shami, one of the leading commanders and recruiters for the Caliphate Cubs, surrendered to the SDF on 20 Aug. 2017
- Committee for Military Manufacturing and Development
  - Aviation sector
    - Al Bara’ bin Malik Brigade (Note: It is known that ISIL has used drones during this campaign. ISIL drones are generally operated by the Al Bara’ bin Malik Brigade.)

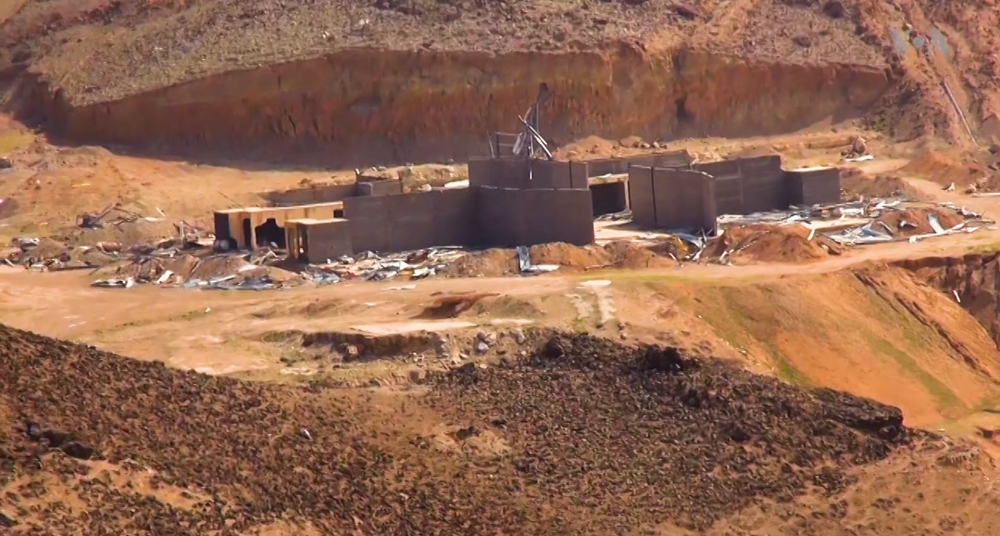
A destroyed chemical weapons factory of ISIL in the Deir ez-Zor Governorate.

- External operations networks, led by Abd al-Basit al-Iraqi (killed by an airstrike on 12 November)
  - Network of Boubaker Al-Hakim ( reported killed by an airstrike on 26 November), including sub-units led by Salah Gourmet, Sammy Djedou, and Walid Hamman (all killed on 4 December)
- Units responsible for contacts and coordination among ISIL forces, led by Abo Sufian al-Orani until his death on 8 January.

Administration

- Wilayat Raqqa, under ISIL Governor Abu Luqman.
  - Majority of al-Breij tribe
  - Elements of al-Ajeel tribe
  - Elements of al-Na'im tribe
- Islamic police (Hibsa), led by Abu Muhammad al-Jazrawi since his appointment around 31 December
  - Al-Khansaa Brigade
- Intelligence and propaganda networks, overseen by Mahmoud al-Isawi until his death on 31 December by an airstrike
  - Ahmad Abousamra, a leading ISIL propagandist, was killed by an airstrike north of al-Thawrah city in January 2017
- Ministry of Information, led by Abu Ahmed al-Souri until he was replaced by Abu Jandal al-Masri around 31 December

== See also ==
- Raqqa campaign (2016–2017)
- Order of battle for the Battle of Mosul (2016–2017)

== Bibliography ==
- Harp, Seth (23 February 2017). "The Anarchists vs. ISIS". Rolling Stone. New York City: Wenner Media LLC. pp. 42–49.
- Tabler, Andrew J. (2017). "Eyeing Raqqa: A tale of four tribes" (PDF). Policy Notes (38). Washington, D.C.: The Washington Institute for Near East Policy. Archived from the original (PDF) on 25 March 2017.
