= Battle of Mosul (2016–2017) order of battle =

During the course of the Battle of Mosul (2016–2017), an international coalition primarily composed of the Iraqi Army, Kurdish Peshmerga and US-led CJTF–OIR forces, along with allied Popular Mobilization Forces and Yazidi militias captured Mosul from the Islamic State, which had used the city as the capital for the Iraqi half of its "caliphate".

== Anti-IS forces ==
=== Iraq ===
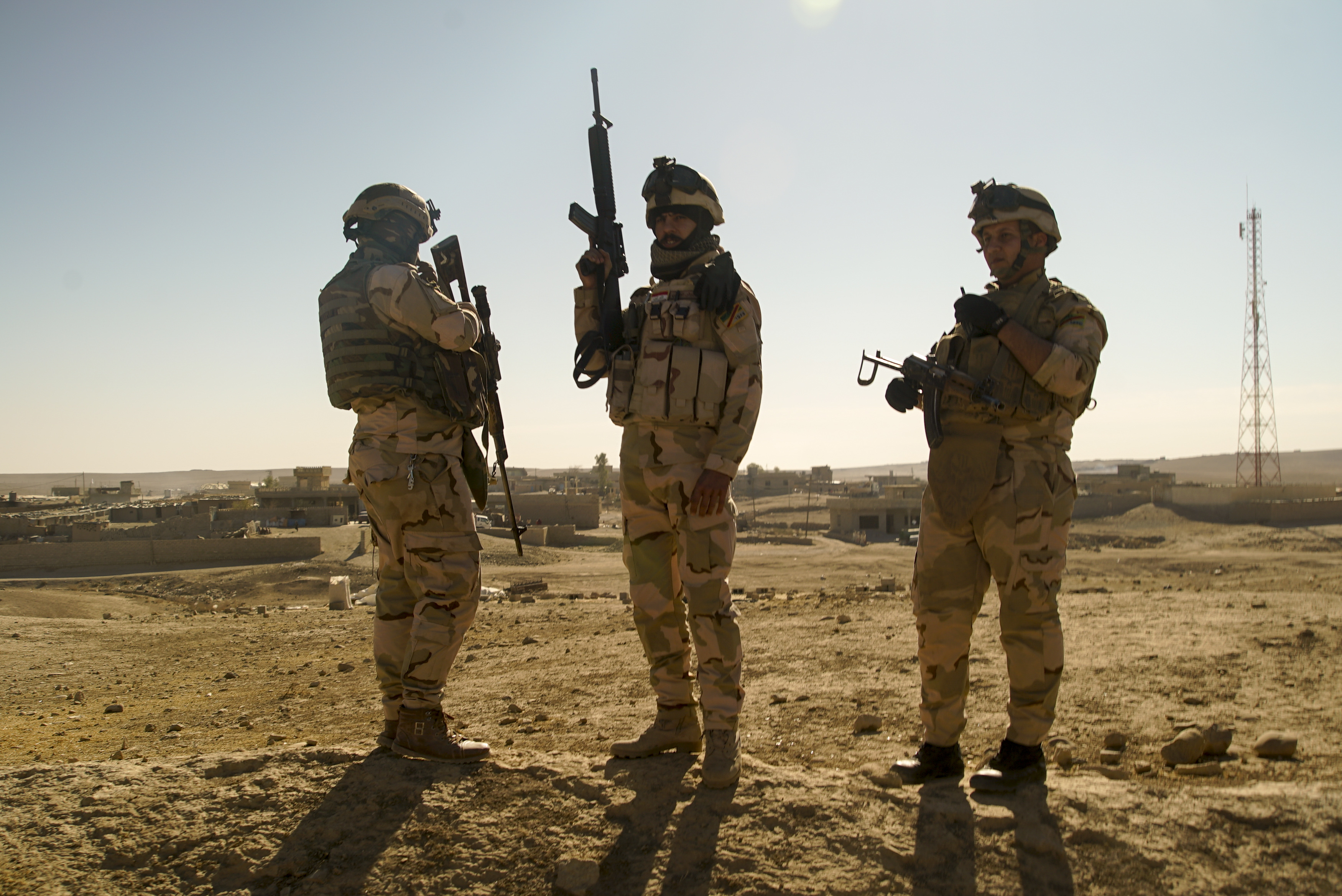
Iraqi Army soldiers, south of Mosul, November 2016.

Commanded by Iraqi Prime Minister Haider al-Abadi, Lieutenant General Abdul Amir Rashid Yarallah (commander of the operation), Major General Najim Abdullah al-Jubouri (ISF commander of the operation)

- Iraqi Army
  - 1st Division
  - 9th Armored Division
    Commanded by Lieutenant General Qassim Jassem Nazal
  - 15th Division
  - 16th Division
    - 3rd Group
      Commanded by Colonel Mohamed Moheil Suleiman al-Jabouri †
  - Unknown
    - 91st Brigade
      Commanded by Colonel Falah Hassan Salman †
- Iraqi Air Force

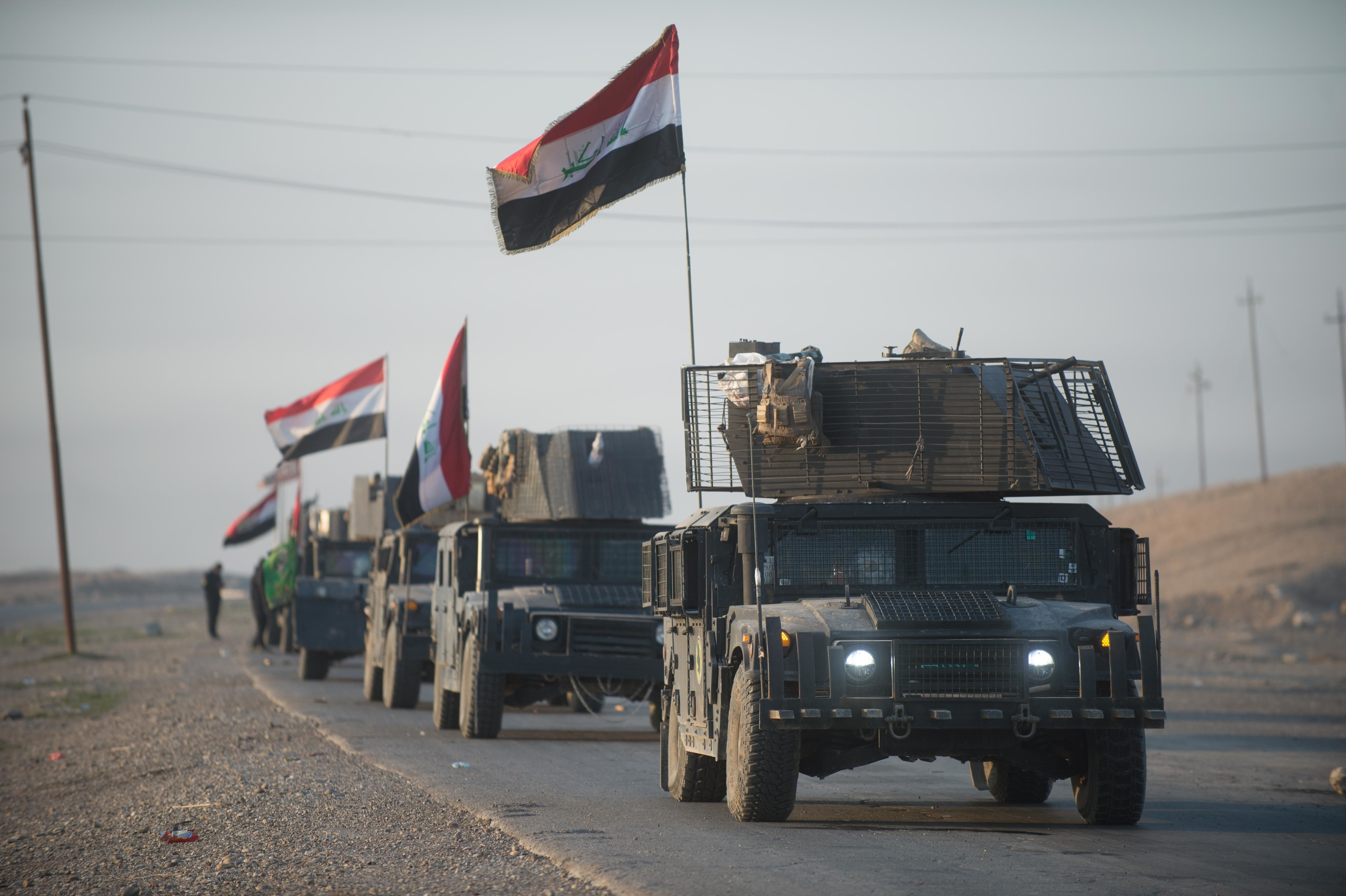
ICTS convoy in Mosul, February 2017.

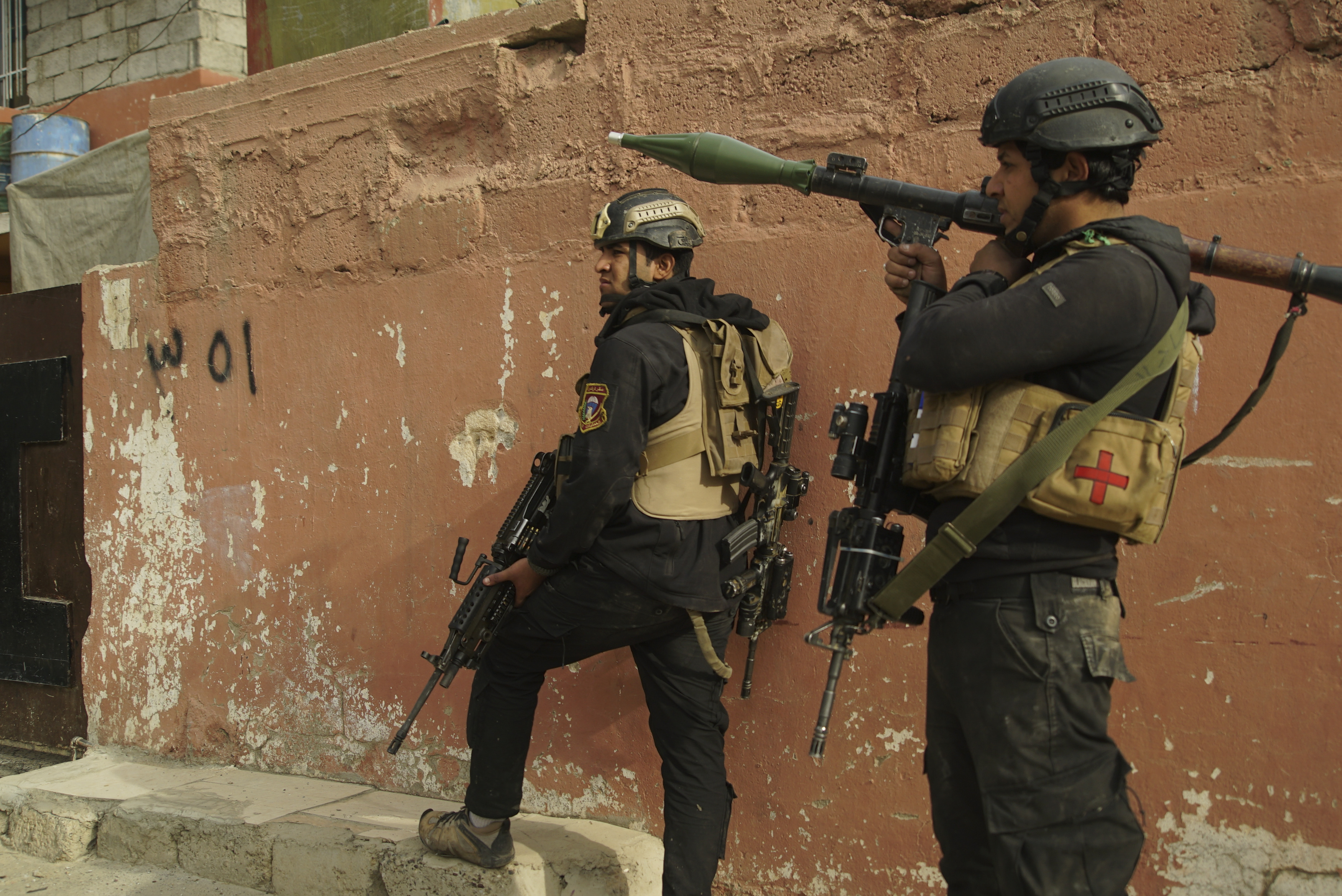
ISOF soldiers in Mosul, November 2016.

- Iraqi Counter Terrorism Service (ICTS)
  Commanded by Lieutenant General Talib Shaghati al-Kenan (Joint Military Operation Command), Lieutenant General Abdul-Ghani al-Assadi, Lieutenant General Abdel-Wahab al-Saadi
  - Iraqi Special Operations Forces (ISOF)
    - 1st Special Operations Brigade ("Golden Division")
      Commanded by Major General Fadhil Jalil al-Barwari
      - 1st Commando Battalion
    - 2nd Special Operations Brigade
      Commanded by Major General Maan al-Saadi
- Federal Police
  Commanded by Lieutenant General Raed Shaker Jawdat
  - Rapid Response Units
    Commanded by Major General Thamer al-Husseini
- Assyrian forces
  - Nineveh Plain Protection Units
    Commanded by General Behnam Abboosh
  - Nineveh Plain Forces
    Commanded by Safaa Khamro
  - Dwekh Nawsha
    Commanded by Albert Kisso
  - Babylon Brigades
    Commanded by Rayan al-Kildani, a Chaldean Catholic Assyrian with close ties to the Badr Organization
- Popular Mobilization Forces (PMF)
  Commanded by Abu Mahdi al-Muhandis
  - Badr Organization
    Commanded by Hadi Al-Amiri
  - Asa'ib Ahl al-Haq
    Commanded by Qais al-Khazali
  - Nineveh Guard
    Commanded by Atheel al-Nujaifi
  - Saraya al-Salam
  - Kata'ib Hezbollah
  - Saraya Ashura
  - Saraya Khorasani
  - Kata'ib al-Imam Ali
  - Kata'ib al-Abbas
  - Harakat Hezbollah al-Nujaba
  - Turkmen Brigades
  - Saraya al-Jihad
  - 39th Regiment
- Local militias
  - Naqshbandi Army
  - Prophet Yunus Brigades
  - Mosul Brigades
  - Ahrar al-Mosul

=== Kurdistan Region ===
Commanded by President Massoud Barzani

- (Kurdistan Region) Peshmerga
  - Zeravani
  - Asayish
  - Counter Terrorism Department
- Kurdistan Workers' Party
  - People's Defence Forces
- Kurdistan Freedom Party
  - Kurdistan National Army
- Sinjar Alliance
  - Sinjar Resistance Units (YBŞ)
    Commanded by Mazlum Shengal
  - Êzîdxan Women's Units (YJÊ)
    Commanded by Berivan Arin
  - Êzîdxan Protection Force (HPÊ)
- Shammar tribal militias

=== US-led forces ===
Combined Joint Task Force – Operation Inherent Resolve (CJTF–OIR)

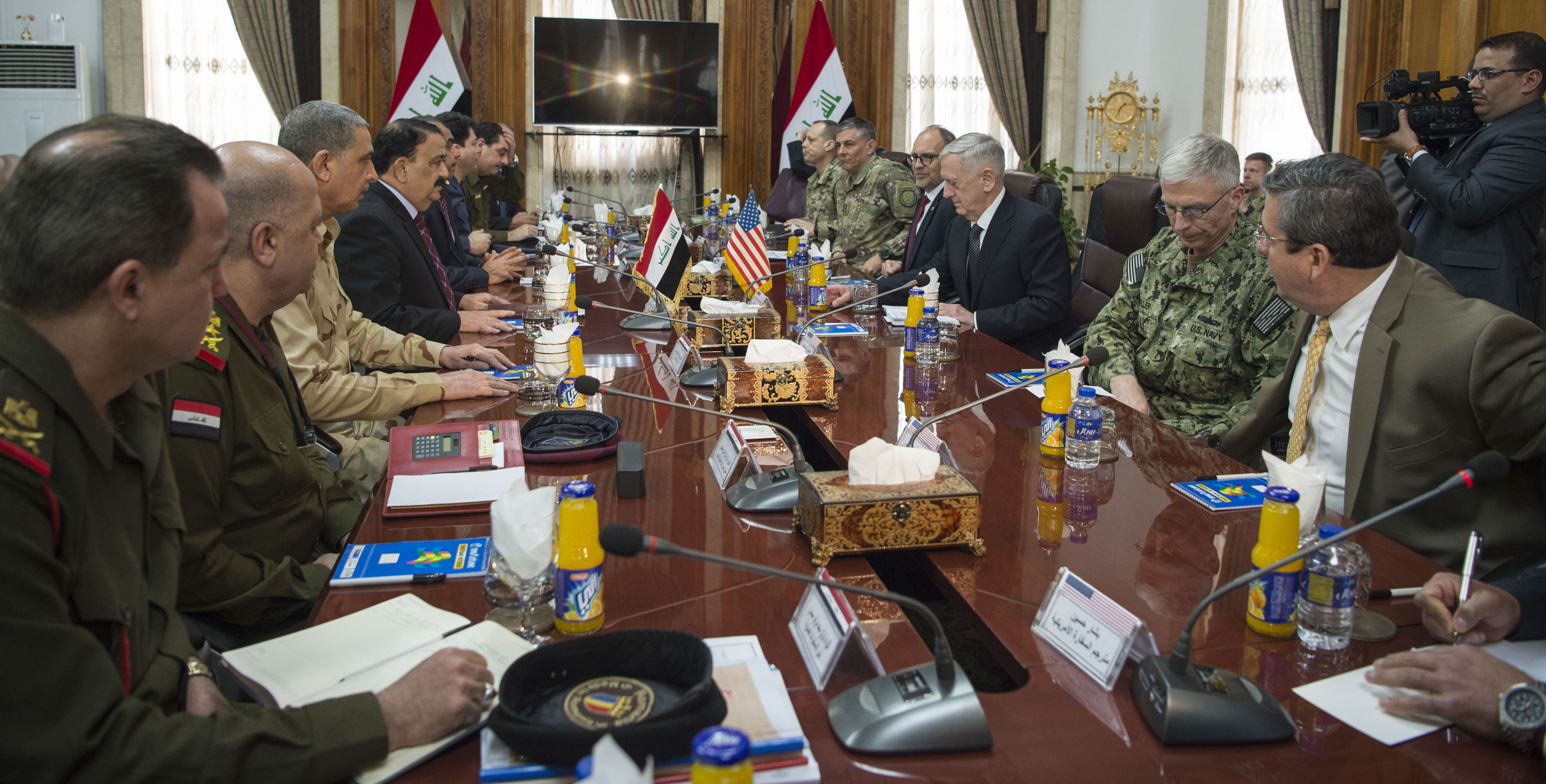
U.S. Secretary of Defense James Mattis meets with Iraqi Minister of Defense Erfan al-Hiyali in Baghdad, 20 February 2017

Commanded by Lieutenant General Stephen J. Townsend

- Combined Joint Forces Land Component Command – Operation Inherent Resolve (CJFLCC-OIR)
  Commanded by Major General Joseph M. Martin

United States Armed Forces

- United States Navy
  - United States Navy SEALs
- United States Army
  - 101st Airborne Division (Air Assault)
    - 2nd Brigade Combat Team
    - 526th Brigade Support Battalion
    - 2-502 Infantry Regiment
  - 1st Cavalry Division
    - 3rd Brigade Combat Team
    - 1-12 Cavalry Regiment
  - Special Operations Forces
- United States Marine Corps
  Commanded by Major General Gary J. Volesky
- United States Air Force

British Armed Forces

- British Army
  - Special Forces
- Royal Air Force

France Armed Forces

- French Army
  - Special Operations Command
- French Air and Space Force

Bundeswehr

- German Army
- German Air Force

Canadian Armed Forces

- Canadian Army
  - Special Operations Forces Command
    - Special Operations Regiment
    - Joint Task Force 2
  - 21 Electronic Warfare Regiment
  - Health Services Group
- Royal Canadian Air Force

Turkish Armed Forces

- Turkish Land Forces
- Turkish Air Force

Australian Defence Force

- Australian Army
  - Special Operations Command
- Royal Australian Air Force

Netherlands Armed Forces

- Royal Netherlands Air and Space Force

Pakistan Armed Forces

- Pakistan Army
  - Medical Corps
- Inter-Services Intelligence

=== Iran-led forces ===
- Islamic Revolutionary Guard Corps
  - Basij
- Hezbollah
  Commanded by Secretary-General Hassan Nasrallah
  - Hezbollah in Iraq
    Commanded by Muhammad Kawarithmi

== Islamic State ==
Islamic State

Military of the Islamic State

- Wilayat Nineveh
- Al-Khansaa Brigade
- Australian Brigade
- Islamic Police (Al-Hisbah)
- Tariq Bin Ziyad battalion
- Ramadi brigade (under Kawasir Division)
- Fallujah brigade (under Yamama Division)
- 3 brigade from Furqan division
- Abu Umar al-Baghdadi brigade (under fatah division)
- Tikrit brigade (under Qadisiya division)
- Cubs of the Caliphate

== See also ==
- Battle of Mosul (2016–17)
- Order of battle for the Raqqa campaign (2016–17)
