= Battle of Raqqa (2017) =

Major battle in the Syrian civil war

- Part of the Raqqa campaign (2016–2017)
- Map of the SDF advances and control situations in Raqqa city, during the battle Islamic State control Syrian Democratic Forces control
Date	6 June – 17 October 2017 (4 months, 1 week and 4 days)
Location	Raqqa, Raqqa Governorate, Syria 35.9500°N 39.0167°E
Result	SDF and allies victory
Territorial changes	The SDF captured 17th Division HQ on 8 June and completely encircled Raqqa on 24 June; The SDF captured the city on 17 October

Belligerents
AANES; Syrian Democratic Forces; People's Defense Units; YPG International; Self Defence Forces (HXP); International Freedom Battalion (Note: Most leftist foreign volunteers fight as part of the YPG, though some have also formed an independent unit, the Antifascist International Tabur, or joined the International Freedom Battalion. The latter is a larger unit, mostly composed of Kurdish and Turkish communists.); Sinjar Resistance Units; Êzîdxan Women's Units; CJTF–OIR: United States; France; United Kingdom; Germany	Islamic State

Commanders and leaders
Rojda Felat (SDF general command member and YPJ commander); Clara Raqqa (high-ranking YPJ commander); Adnan Abu Amjad † (Manbij Military Council general commander); Muhammad Mustafa Ali "Abu Adel" (Manbij Military Council and Northern Sun Battalion commander); Dilsuz Hashme (Manbij Military Council senior commander); Ibrahim Semho (Euphrates Liberation Brigade commander); Abu Imad (Elite Forces commander); Ahmad Sultan (Army of Revolutionaries commander-in-chief); Ali Çiçek (Kurdish Front commander); Abu Raad Bakary (Tribal Forces commander); Nubar Ozanyan † (IFB and TKP/ML commander)	(Islamic State) Abu Khattab al-Tunisi † (ISIL high command member and commander of eastern Raqqa) (Islamic State) Abu Osama al-Tunisi † (ISIL commander) (Islamic State) Abu Ubada al-Shami (surrendered) (Caliphate Cubs commander and chief recruiter) (Islamic State) Abu Osama (Commander of ISIL holdouts by Oct. 2017)

Units involved
See anti-ISIL forces order of battle	See ISIL order of battle

Strength
30,000–40,000 total: 10,000–15,000 in the city (SOHR estimate)	3,000–5,000

Casualties and losses
690 killed (per SOHR); 655 killed (per SDF); 1,000 killed (per ISIL)	1,400 killed (per SOHR); 1,246+ killed, 715 captured (per SDF)
- 1,540 civilians killed (per SOHR); 1,300–1,600 civilians killed by US led airstrikes (per Airwars and Amnesty International); 1,854–1,873 civilians killed (per local monitors); Tens of thousands of civilians displaced 3,200 combats and civilians killed overall

The battle of Raqqa (2017), also known as the second battle of Raqqa, was the fifth and final phase of the Raqqa campaign (2016–2017) launched by the Syrian Democratic Forces (SDF) against the Islamic State (IS) with an aim to seize the city of Raqqa, the de facto capital of ISIL since 2014. The battle began on 6 June 2017, and was supported by airstrikes and ground troops from the US-led coalition. The operation was named the "Great Battle" by the SDF. It concluded on 17 October 2017, with the SDF fully capturing the city of Raqqa.

The battle ran concurrently with the conclusion of the Battle of Mosul (2016–2017), which had started seven months earlier, as part of an effort by the CJTF–OIR and its allies to strip ISIL of its regional centers of power and to dismantle it as a state. It continued while Syrian Arab Army and allies began clearing ISIL across the Euphrates, reaching the point of the lifting of the Siege of Deir ez-Zor (2014–2017).

Like other battles fought against ISIL, the battle for Raqqa was marked by intense urban combat, with fighting both on the surface level, and in tunnels below that ISIL militants moved through. One U.S. commander described it as some of the most intense urban fighting since the Second World War. Out of a pre-war population of 300,000 some 270,000 people were said to have fled Raqqa. Around 80% of the city was destroyed by the battle.

== Background ==
In 2015, ISIL began to fortify the city and its surrounding areas with bunkers and a network of tunnels.

By June 2017, Raqqa remained the only major Syrian city fully under ISIL control and was, therefore, its effective center of operations. With its large number of foreign fighters, Raqqa was a planning center for terrorist attacks against European cities. The Raqqa campaign was launched by the SDF on 6 November 2016 in an effort to capture the city, and it had resulted in the SDF capturing a large amount of territory in the Raqqa Governorate from ISIL, including the city of al-Thawrah, and the infrastructure at Euphrates Dam and Mansoura Dam.

As many as 500 US special forces operated on the ground in northern Syria in support of the Raqqa campaign. The US and other coalition members supplied heavy weapons, intelligence collection, communications support and other assistance to the SDF as part of their intervention in the conflict. The battle began in the wake of a tumultuous period for the coalition, as internal pressures had been elevated by the Qatar diplomatic crisis, which had seen diplomatic relations between Qatar and other coalition members severed, and was publicly supported by President Donald Trump.

Local residents stated that many ISIL militants had already abandoned the city and traveled to Deir ez-Zor in anticipation of the impending attack on their capital. ISIL assaulted the regime's enclave in Deir ez-Zor, which at the time was split between ISIL and the Syrian government, launching a series of strong attacks against the Syrian Army from June to August.

It was reported by AFP that in a US airstrike, 21 civilians were killed while attempting to flee Raqqa by dinghy on the Euphrates River. The event was also reported by Al Jazeera, but with uncertainty as to who carried out the bombing.

== Timeline of the battle ==
=== Entering Raqqa ===
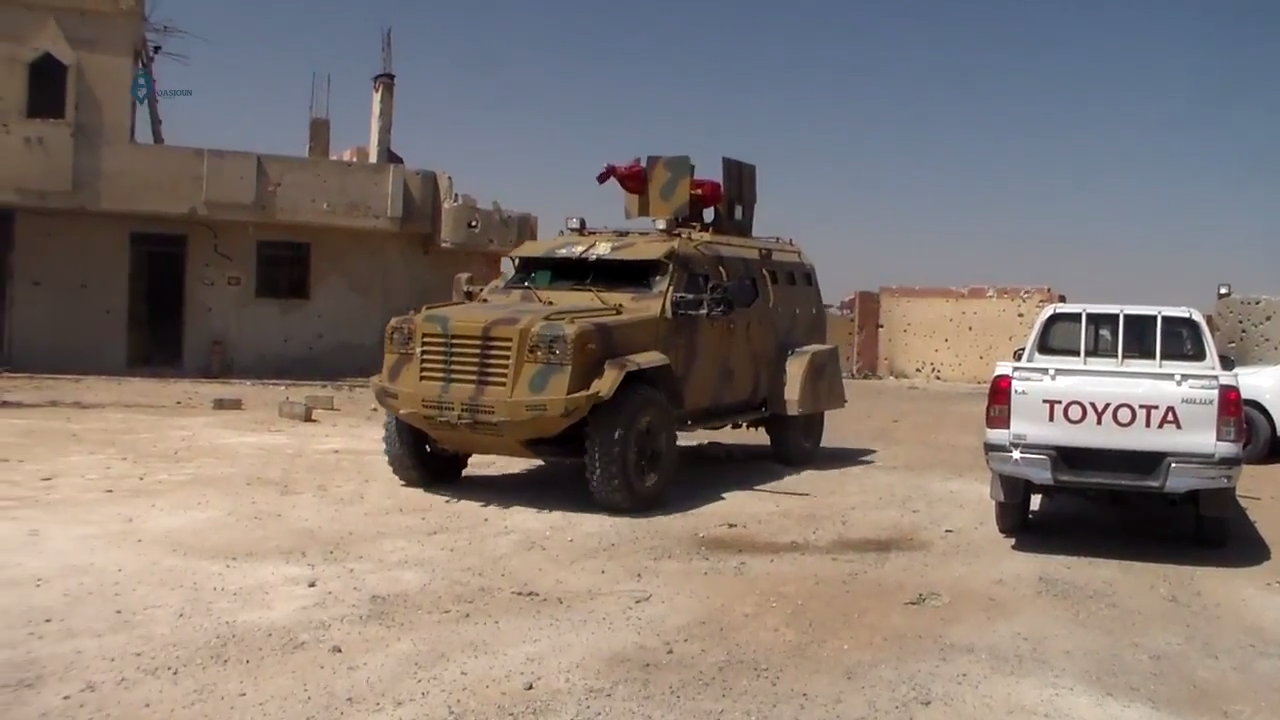
An SDF MRAP and pickup truck in Raqqa

The United States Air Force conducted heavy airstrikes on Raqqa the day before the battle. The battle was officially launched by the SDF in the dawn of 6 June 2017. The offensive came from Raqqa's north, east, and west. Supported by US airstrikes, the SDF attacked the former base of the 17th Division north of Raqqa and the Mashlab district in the southeastern part of the city. By the end of the day, the SDF captured more than half of Mashlab district and also attacked the Andalus district in the northwest. The SDF also captured the village of al-Jazra.

On 7 June, the SDF captured a ruined fortress on the edge of the city, and a US coalition official said the attack was set to accelerate. On the same day, the SDF captured the Tell Harqal district of the city.

Brett H. McGurk, the special envoy with responsibility over the US-led military coalition, stated that the fighting in the city would be accelerated by the failures of ISIL in the Battle of Mosul, and stated that the forces were prepared for a "difficult and very long-term battle".

The SDF entered the former 17th Division base and the nearby sugar plant on 8 June, but retreated due to heavy casualties.

The following night, Coalition airplanes heavily struck the city, killing 23 civilians. At the same time the SDF, supported by US special forces, were close to capturing the entire al-Mashlab neighborhood. Later that day, the SDF entered Sabahiyah neighborhood from the west and captured the remaining parts of the al-Mashlab neighborhood within hours.

On 10 June, the SDF entered the Roman suburb and were locked "in fierce fighting", while they were reinforcing the western half of Al-Sabahiya. An international coalition spokesperson stated that they had destroyed numerous targets in Raqqa between 7–9 June; a minefield, eleven fighting positions, four vehicles, three ISIL headquarters, two vehicle-borne improvised explosive devices (VBIEDs) and an ISIL-held building. At the end of the day, the SDF took control over the suburb of Harqaliya. During the battle, US forces used white phosphorus munitions in the city several times, per ISIL video footage and statements, the Syrian foreign ministry, and human rights organizations. A spokesman for the US military did not confirm or deny the statements, the US later confirmed it was using white phosphorus "for screening, obscuring, and marking in a way that fully considers the possible incidental effects on civilians and civilian structures".

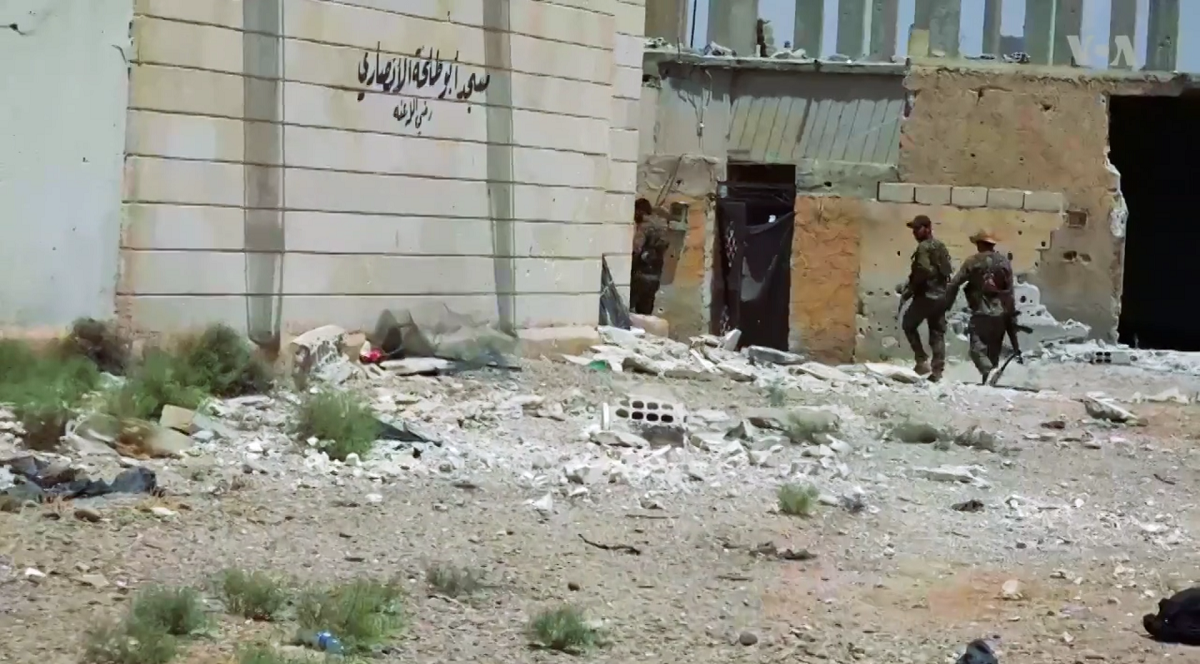
SDF fighters walk through a destroyed area in the suburbs of Raqqa.

By 11 June, 79 civilians reportedly had been killed. The SDF captured "wide parts" of the Roman suburb and advanced into al-Sinaa neighborhood and al-Hal Market near the northern banks of the Euphrates River. ISIL fighters attacked the sugar plant that the SDF had captured three days earlier in the northern part of the city.

On 12 June, the SDF began the process of capturing al-Sinaa and al-Hattin neighborhoods, along with the al-Sinaa industrial zone. The SDF captured Sahil village southwest of Raqqa after clashes between the SDF and ISIL broke out and lasted until the next morning.

On 14 June, the SDF entered the al-Berid neighborhood in the western part of Raqqa, following intense fighting in which an ISIL suicide bomber was killed.

On 15 June, the SDF captured the al-Sinaa neighborhood and entered the Batani neighborhood. Several CJTF–OIR troops were injured by a VBIED planted by ISIL in al-Sinaa neighborhood.

On 18 June, the SDF captured Kasrat Sheyh Juma village, to the south of Raqqa. SDF forces also captured Batani neighborhood in the east.

=== Encirclement of Raqqa ===
On 19 June, ISIL counter-attacked at the old city walls and managed to encircle a group of SDF fighters, among them members of the Elite Forces (SEF). Other Elite Forces then attempted to break the encirclement, shooting down an ISIL bombing drone, and breaking through to their fifteen besieged fighters at the Bab Baghdad gate of the old city. In the course of this operation, the SEF lost its first member in the battle for Raqqa and its fourth in the Raqqa campaign. On the next day, the SDF, supported by especially heavy airstrikes, continued to advance in northwestern Raqqa amid "desperate" attempts from ISIL to stop their progress. An ISIL counter-attack on the Batani district was repelled. On 23 June, the SDF began an assault on the Qadisiya district, which led to fierce fighting in the area. On the next day, the SDF completely encircled and besieged Raqqa city, trapping about 4,000 ISIL militants.

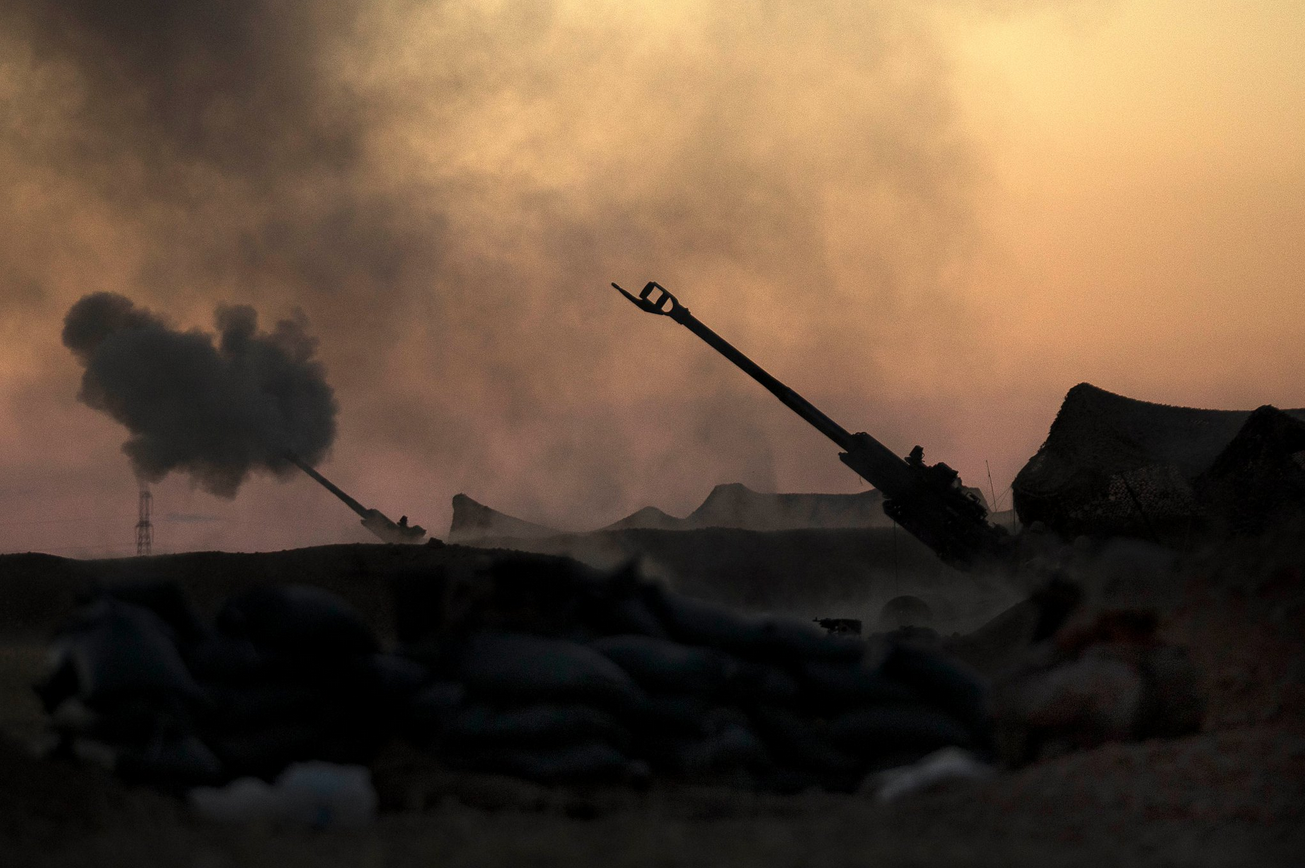
The United States Marine Corps provides fire support to the SDF during the battle.

By 25 June, the SDF had captured most of the western Qadisiya district, whereupon ISIL launched a major counter-attack, leading to extremely heavy fighting. On the following day, the SDF finally captured all of Qadisiya, making it the sixth district in the city under SDF control. In response, ISIL launched multiple counter-attacks in the city and on the Euphrates' southern bank, though these failed. By the end of the day, the SDF had also taken control of al-Farkha village to Raqqa's southwest. CJTF–OIR spokesman Ryan Dillon said that the resistance of ISIL increased as the SDF further advanced into the city.

On 27 June, the SDF launched an attack against the old city, which was repelled by ISIL, though they succeeded in capturing the village of al-Ghota south of Raqqa.

On 28 June, the SDF clashed with ISIL militants near a kindergarten in Ar-Ruda neighborhood in eastern Raqqa, killing eight ISIL fighters. The SDF also entered al-Nahda neighborhood in western Raqqa where they clashed heavily with ISIL militants, which resulted in 19 ISIL fighters being killed. In course of the next two days, the SDF cut off all remaining escape routes for ISIL from Raqqa. Clashes between the SDF and ISIL militants also began in al-Yarmouk and Huteen neighborhoods in western Raqqa, while the SDF captured another village south of the city. Nevertheless, a major ISIL counter-attack on 30 June, spearheaded by numerous VBIEDs, retook the al-Sinaa neighborhood after 350 SDF fighters who were part of an unidentified Free Syrian Army (FSA) unit abandoned their posts and fled.

=== SDF advance into the old city ===
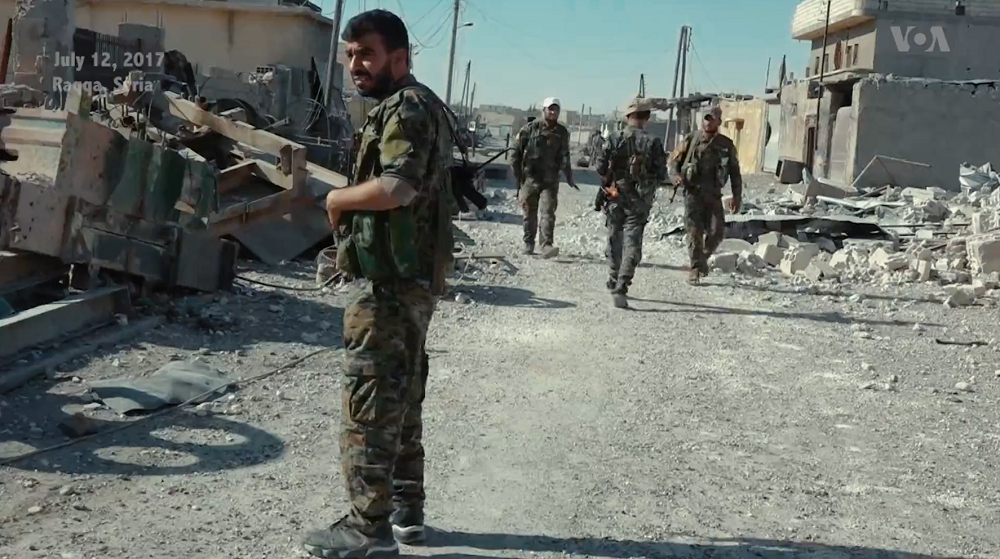
SDF fighters in a largely destroyed part of Raqqa's downtown

During 1–2 July, SDF fighters cleared the al-Hal market in eastern Raqqa of ISIL militants, while the SDF continued to advance in other neighborhoods of the city with the help of heavy CJTF–OIR airstrikes. Ratla, a village southeast of the city also fell to the SDF. The SDF entered the Hashim Bin al-Melek neighborhood in southern Raqqa and the al-Yarmouk neighborhood in the west on 3 July. In the night of 3–4 July, a CJTF–OIR precision airstrike destroyed a 25-meter-long section of the medieval wall surrounding Raqqa's old city. This was done so that the SDF could finally enter the heavily fortified old city, while at the same time preserving most of the wall. The SDF advanced into the old city, capturing the Palace of the Maidens, albeit encountering heavy resistance. Meanwhile, the US-backed forces continued to make progress in other parts of Raqqa, reportedly capturing half of the Hisham ibn Abd al-Malik neighborhood, while a major assault by the Elite Forces managed to retake the al-Sinaa neighborhood from ISIL. Some less disciplined Elite Forces units, however, were demoralized by the heavy fighting and retreated from the city, against the orders of the SDF command, and their own superiors and comrades. (Note: While they are simply said to be members of unspecified FSA units in the article, the retreating fighters can be identified in the photographs as members of the Elite Forces due to their arm patches.) Nevertheless, the other Elite Forces units remained at the frontlines.

Heavy fighting in the old city continued through the next two days, and the SDF advances were slow despite heavy airstrikes in their support. Intense ISIL counter-attacks inside Raqqa and south of the city at Ratla were mostly repelled, though ISIS militants managed to retake a part of the al-Hal market. Especially intense clashes also took place in the western city, mostly for the al-Bareed neighborhood, as both sides launched repeated attacks in attempts to gain territory. By 6 July, pro-SDF media stated that the Coalition forces were making progress in the west and that the ISIL defenses there showed signs of breaking. The international coalition also sent further weapons, supplies, and reinforcements to Raqqa. Meanwhile, ISIL put up a bounty of approximately US$4,000 for every US soldier or foreign SDF fighter killed. Over the next days, the fierce fighting in Raqqa continued, with the SDF capturing the Harun al-Rashid Castle in the old city, and the al-Mazarie Square in the west. By 10 July, the battle in Raqqa was described as increasingly "desperate house-to-house fight" without frontlines, as ISIL fighters holed up in small pockets of resistance that proved to be only extremely difficult to clear out for the often not adequately armed SDF fighters. ISIL suicide attacks also hampered the advance of the Coalition forces.

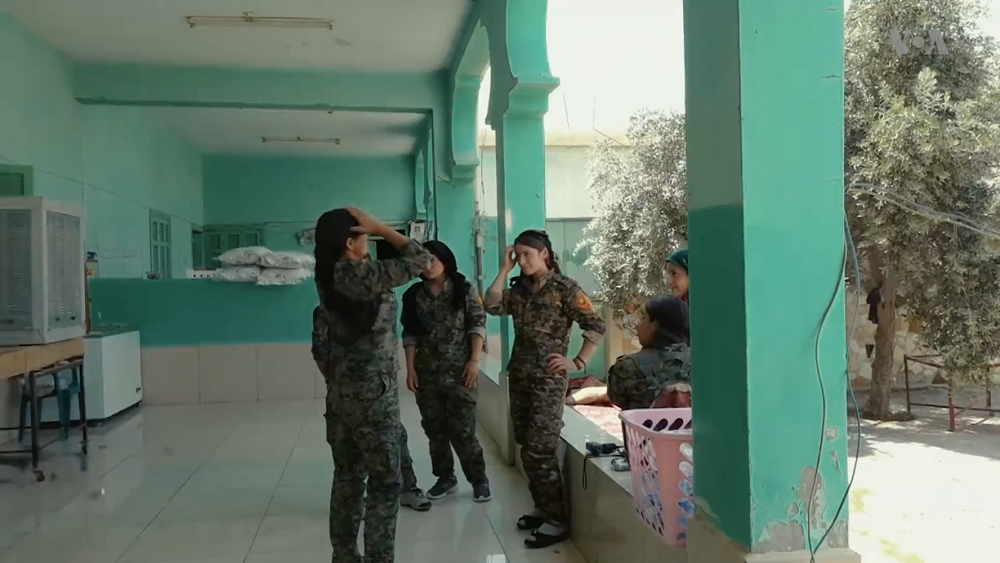
Female Yazidi fighters of the YJÊ also participated in the battle for Raqqa. Yazidis were massacred or enslaved by ISIL, and the YJÊ aimed to liberate Yazidi slaves who still lived in the city, while taking revenge on ISIL.

The SDF progress was also reportedly hindered by disputes within the SDF and the distrust of the locals toward the anti-ISIL Coalition. Due to ISIL propaganda and long-standing distrust between the ethnic groups in Syria, many of Raqqa's Arabs are wary of the Kurdish forces within the SDF. On 8 July, the Syrian Observatory for Human Rights (SOHR) reported that the Arab Elite Forces had withdrawn from Raqqa as result of disputes within the SDF, and their sometimes inferior battlefield performance; the SDF, however, denied this statement as baseless rumors and said that the Elite Forces were still involved in the operation. One Elite Forces' commander, Abu Saleh, later confirmed that at least the unit of around 1,000 fighters that he led had withdrawn from Raqqa; nevertheless, there were still reports that at least some of the Elite Forces still continued to be active in Raqqa. The reports of the Elite Forces' reported retreat furthered the distrust of the local population toward the SDF. There were also statements that members of the Manbij Military Council were looting houses in the city. Whereas progress in Raqqa city during this time proved slow, the SDF made some progress south of the Euphrates on 10 and 11 July, capturing two villages, including al-Ukeirshi, which had served as major military base for ISIL.

These are days of trials. The greatest thing you can present to God is to sell yourself to him cheaply.

— Statement of an ISIL fighter in Raqqa to his comrades. The ISIL militants in Raqqa were considered to fight extremely tenaciously, repeatedly launching "vicious" counter-attacks and holding out amid massive bombardments.

Over the next four days, the SDF made some major advances, securing the al-Batani, Hisham ibn Abd al-Malik, al-Bareed and al-Qasyeh neighborhoods, and about 50% of the old city; after heavy counter-attacks, however, the SDF had to abandon some of its newly captured territory in the old city and the aforementioned neighborhoods. Meanwhile, CJTF–OIR chief commander Stephen J. Townsend said that the only options for the ISIL fighters in Raqqa were to "surrender or be killed".

Between 15 and 18 July, fighting mostly concentrated on the western neighborhoods of al-Tayyar and Yarmouk as well as the Hisham ibn Abd al-Malik neighborhood in the southeast, as both sides tried to gain/regain ground. Even though the SDF eventually prevailed in the former two, the coalition made little to no progress in the eastern and old city, while casualties among both the SDF as well as the civilian population had risen drastically. As result, the SDF began to shift its strategy in the east and the old city, advancing slower and with more caution, in order to minimize further losses and to avoid the destruction of historic monuments, such as the Abbasid al-Atiq Mosque. In course of the fighting, a major ISIL headquarters and weapons storage center was destroyed. On 20 July, ISIL launched intense counter-attacks against all the areas where the SDF had progressed over the previous several days.

=== Capture of the city's south and center ===
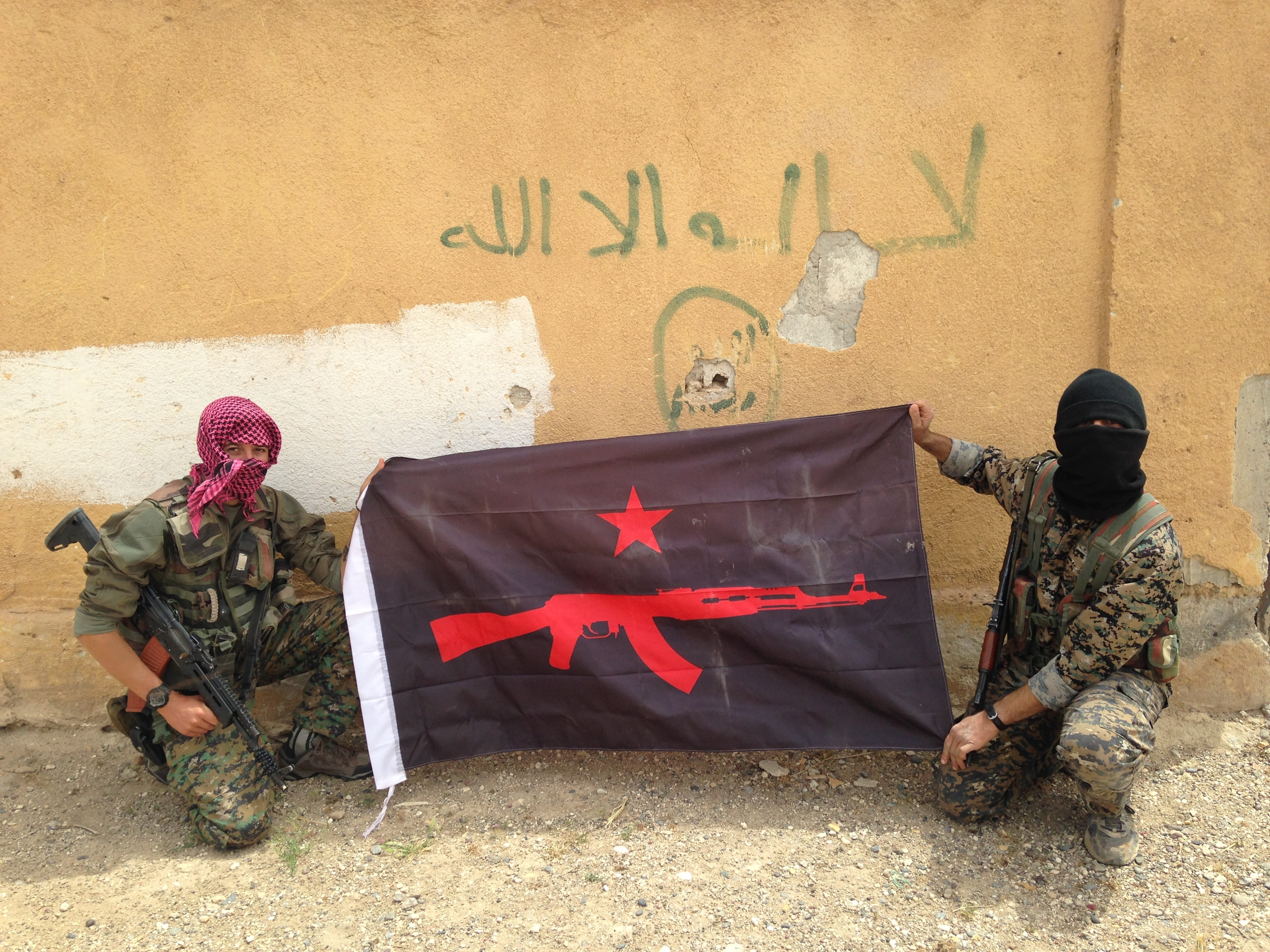
Foreign volunteers of the anarchist IRPGF, a unit of the International Freedom Battalion, in Raqqa

Despite these continued counter-attacks, the SDF further advanced against ISIL during the following four days. By 24 July, the coalition had fully secured the neighborhoods al-Romaniya, Hutteen, Qadisiyah, Yarmouk, Mashlab, al-Batani and al-Sinaa, while having taken control of parts of Hisham ibn Abd al-Malik, al-Rawda, al-Rumaila, al-Muazzafin, al-Hamra and Nazlat Shehada, and the old city. As a result, around 41% of Raqqa was held by the SDF. By this time, the center of fighting was in the southern city, namely for the Nazlat Shehada, Hisham bin Abdul Malik and al-Kournish neighborhoods. By 28 July, the SDF had made further important advances in the western and southern city and increased their territorial control to 50% of Raqqa. While combat in the central and southern city continued, the SDF advanced into the al-Nahdah neighborhood in Raqqa's northeast on 30 July.

Between 1 and 3 August, the SDF captured most of the Hisham ibn Abd al-Malik and Nazlat Shehada neighborhoods and other important locations, thus largely securing southern Raqqa. ISIL was also pushed back in the old city, losing control of the Uwais al-Qarni Mosque and the 'Ammar Ben Yasser shrine, and in Raqqa's north, where the SDF conquered around 10 km^{2} (four square miles) of territory. As result of their shrinking territory and constant bombardments, both the 2,000 militants, as well as tens of thousands of civilians still trapped in the ISIL-held areas, increasingly suffered from shortages of food, medicines and drinking water, causing ISIL to alleviate the situation by granting 3,000 civilians safe passage from their territory to SDF-held neighborhoods. Nevertheless, ISIL's deteriorating prospects in Raqqa were beginning to seriously undermine the morale of the group's Syrian fighters, many of which wanted to escape or surrender. These native militants remained, however, due to fear of ISIL's foreign mujahideen. These foreigners wanted to make their last stand at Raqqa, and are ready to kill all who want to surrender. The hardcore ISIL elements in Raqqa also reportedly had chemical weapons in their possession, which they would use when their position became completely untenable, regardless of possible civilian casualties.

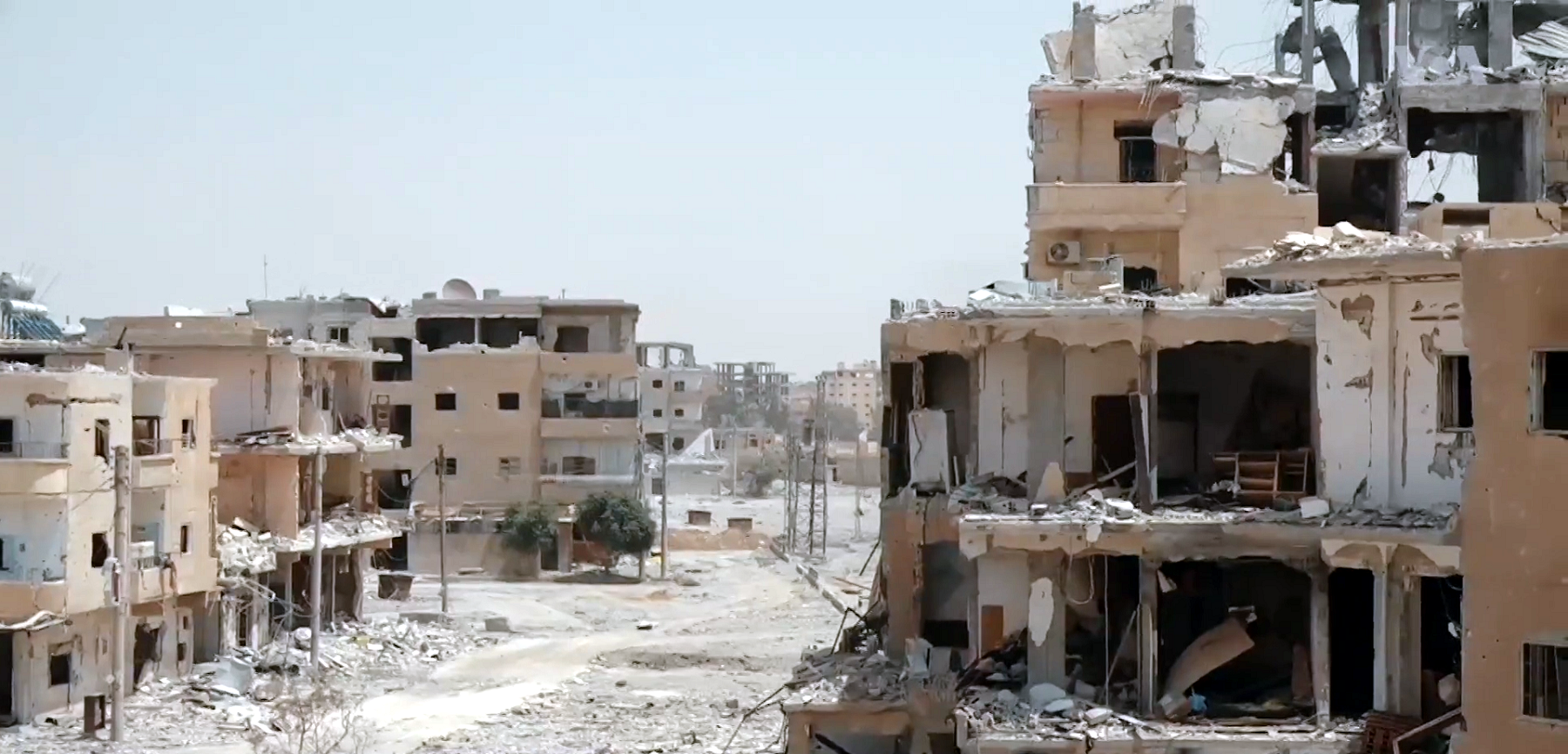
Much of Raqqa suffered extensive damage during the battle, while an activist in the ISIL-held neighborhoods said that the situation for the besieged populace was "beyond catastrophic, I can't describe the situation as anything besides hellish. People are just waiting for their turn to die."

By 6 August, the SDF controlled around 55% of Raqqa. Over the next days, the SDF, bolstered by new reinforcements, evicted ISIL fully from the southern city. By 10 August the western and eastern fronts of the SDF linked up in the south and thereby cut off the access to the Euphrates from the ISIL militants. The remaining ISIL forces responded to these advances by launching major counter-attacks between 12 and 14 August in an attempt to regain ground in the northeastern and southern city; although the assaults were reportedly unsuccessful, both sides suffered numerous casualties.

Despite this, the SDF managed to capture more territory in the old city, bringing about 57% of Raqqa under their control by 14 August. In course of the next days, the SDF cleared out the remaining ISIL holdouts in the southern city, and by 20 August had begun to push into the neighborhoods north of Hisham ibn Abd al-Malik and Nazlat Shehada. Between 22 and 29 August, the SDF further advanced in Raqqa's old city, capturing several symbolic or strategic locations such as the old clock tower (a site for ISIL's public executions). Nevertheless, ISIL continued to fight fiercely for the 10% of the old city it still controlled, as well as other neighborhoods in the city center in which the militants still held territory: Al-Moror, al-Nahda, al-Mansour, and most importantly al-Thaknah (the location of ISIL's former government buildings). In the course of this heavy close-quarter fighting, Adnan Abu Amjad, leader of the Manbij Military Council and high-ranking SDF commander, was killed in combat.

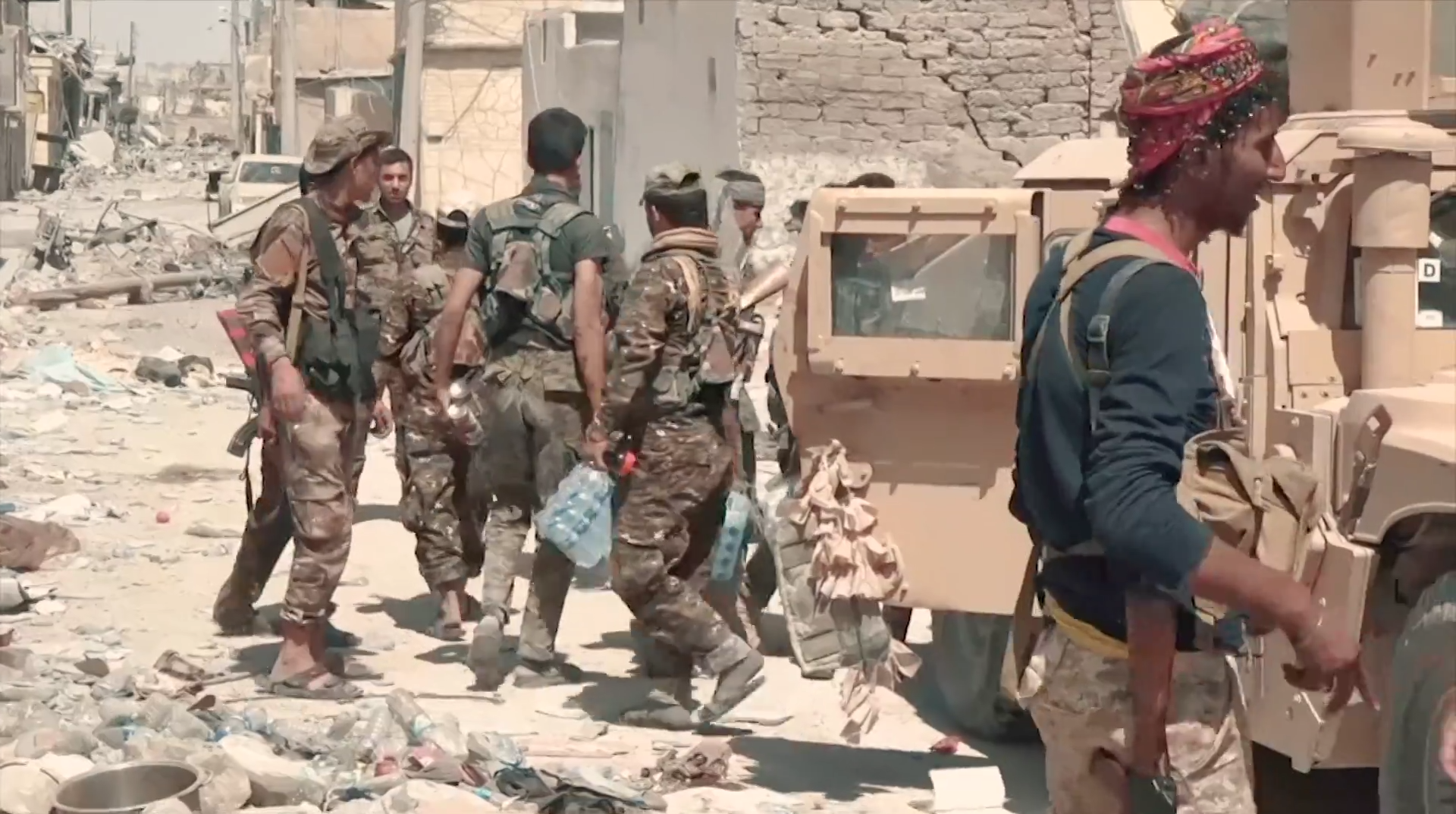
SDF fighters with a Humvee in central Raqqa

By 1 September, the SDF had secured almost all of the old city, though some ISIL holdouts continued to resist in the al-Busariyah alley and the Grand Mosque. These ISIL forces were finally destroyed with the support of US Boeing AH-64 Apaches on 2 and 3 September, bringing all of the old city under SDF control. The coalition forces also advanced into the Al-Morour and Daraiya neighborhoods, which were captured by 6 September. By 9 September, ISIL control over Raqqa had been reduced to about 36%, most importantly the northern neighborhoods of Al-Andalus, Shamal Sekket al-Qitar, al-Huriyah, Teshreen, and al-Tawaso'eiyah. Besides these, ISIL pockets of resistance were reported by SOHR in nine mostly SDF-held neighborhoods.

=== Battle for the north and the last holdouts ===
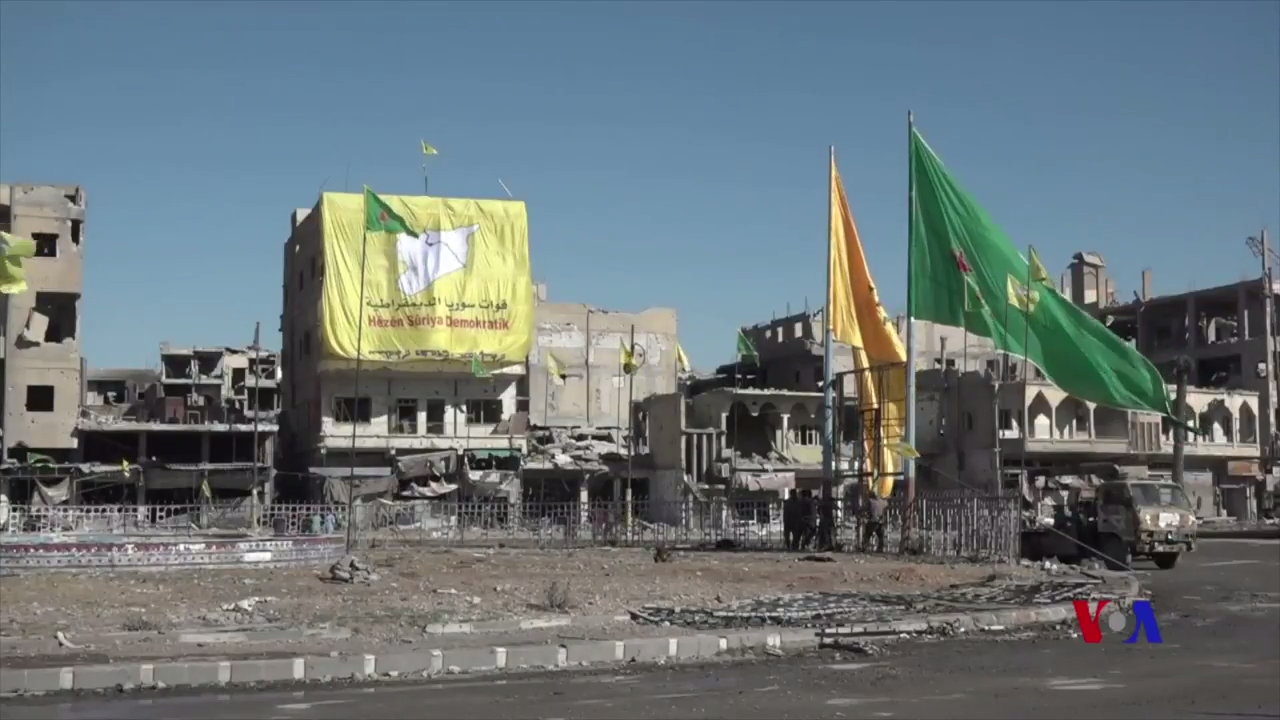
Flags of the SDF, YPG and YPJ in the centre of Raqqa city after its complete capture by the SDF

On 14 September, the SDF fully secured al-Thaknah, "one of [Raqqa's] most important neighborhoods", after a 24-hour-long battle. With al-Thaknah captured, the SDF controlled about 70% of Raqqa. By this time, the situation of the remaining 1,200 ISIL fighters in the city had become desperate, as they lacked fresh water, food, ammunition, and weaponry; some of them were even sent foraging into SDF-held territories in order to get direly needed supplies. Nevertheless, many ISIL militants refused to surrender and vow to continue defending Raqqa and putting up severe resistance and instead launched suicide attacks on coalition forces when their positions became untenable. The remaining ISIL resistance was centered on Raqqa's north as well as enclaves in the south-west and central city. Activists criticised that the anti-ISIL coalition did little to avoid civilian casualties at this stage. Though it was said that ISIL used the civilians as human shields, the activists also said that neither the SDF nor CJTF–OIR took any "extraordinary measures to assist civilians who [were] trying to flee the city", with the United States Air Force instead indiscriminately bombing all who attempted to escape by boat or car.

Such airstrikes did, however, also decisively weaken ISIL's defenses at its last strongholds. Heavy airstrikes by the US Air Force on 20 September caused ISIL to retreat from five northern neighborhoods into the central city, which the militants deemed more secure. Most of northern Raqqa was subsequently occupied by the SDF without much resistance. By 22 September, it initially was reported that ISIL had lost all of its territory in Raqqa, but the SDF later said that the militants still controlled or at least had a presence in 20–25% of the city.

We won't leave until the city turns into another Kobane. We'll only leave Raqqa when the last of us dies.

— —Abu Muath Al Tunisi, ISIL fighter. According to the SDF, foreign ISIL mujahideen wanted to make their last stand at Raqqa, while ensuring that most of the city is destroyed during the battle. This would benefit their propaganda, as they could blame "western bombs [for destroying] an ancient Arab city."

Over the next days, heavy fighting continued for areas in the northern, western, central and southwestern city in which ISIL still had a substantial presence. Progress proved slow against fierce ISIL resistance. These last ISIL forces, as in many cases small groups or even individual militants holed up in their hideouts and waited for the SDF to come for them while sniping at them. The SDF fighters, not well enough equipped for such tasks, often could not clear out these fortified and booby-trapped holdouts without risking disproportionate casualties. Thus, they had to call in airstrikes; "time and time again, entire buildings are taken to kill a single [ISIL] fighter". ISIL also continued to launch counter-attacks. Its militants used their hidden tunnel networks to assault the SDF from behind or disguised themselves as civilians and even SDF members to infiltrate enemy positions. On 26 September, for example, dozens of ISIL militants with YPG insignias managed to enter SDF positions in the northeastern city, killing at least 28 coalition fighters before they were themselves overwhelmed. The exact number of ISIL fighters who were still active in Raqqa at this point was disputed, with estimates ranging from around 400 (according to local SDF troops), to 400–900 (United States Department of Defense estimate), to 700 regular militants and 1,500 pro-ISIL militiamen (intelligence and information obtained from former ISIL members). Of these forces, only the foreign mujahideen were expected to fight to the end. Native Syrian Arab ISIL militants had instead fled the city by the hundreds, often disguised as civilians.

The fighting between advancing SDF units and ISIL holdouts was especially bitter at the al-Naim roundabout in Raqqa's center, which had been dubbed "the Circle of Hell", and various fortified ISIL strongholds. Among these were the National Hospital, where ISIL had one of its headquarters and held hostages; a sports stadium, where the militants were storing weapons; and around grain silos in the north of the city. On 15 October, close to 50 trucks, 13 buses and more than 100 ISIL vehicles evacuated around 4,000 people from Raqqa under an agreement with the SDF, including 250 ISIL fighters and 3,500 of their family members, along with weapons and ammunition. Around 400 civilians were reportedly used as human shields by ISIL during the transportation.

After the ISIL convoy left Raqqa under the agreement on 15 October, the SDF announced the "final phase" of the battle, code-named the Battle of Martyr Adnan Abu Amjad, to capture the remaining ISIL holdouts in 10% of the city. On 16 October, the SDF reportedly destroyed the last ISIL forces in the al-Andalus and al-Matar neighborhoods, and finally secured the al-Naim roundabout.

On 17 October, the SDF launched an attack overnight and captured the National Hospital and further advanced towards the ISIL-held stadium, the jihadists' last foothold in the city. The stadium was later captured, marking the defeat of ISIL in Raqqa.

On 20 October, the SDF officially declared victory in Raqqa.

== Aftermath ==
Around 80% of Raqqa had been left "uninhabitable" after the battle, according to the UN.

According to Airwars, a team of independent journalists, by October 2017, at least 1,300 civilians likely died as a result of Coalition strikes (more than 3,200 such deaths have been reported in total). Overall, local monitors say at least 1,800 civilians were killed in the fighting." In April 2019, a joint investigation by Amnesty International and Airwars reported that 1,600 civilians were killed by coalition strikes during the battle.

=== Cleaning and reconstructions ===
Efforts to clear the city of mines started in a controlled area, which had later killed and injured hundreds of civilians. The US pledged minor assistance to rebuild the city.

=== Mass graves ===
In February 2019, 3,500 bodies were found in an ISIL mass grave in the al-Fukheikha agricultural suburb. In March 2019, another ISIL mass grave was discovered with 300 buried bodies. In July 2019, 200 corpses were found near Raqqa.

== Official reactions ==
United States
The US Secretary of State's statement of 20 October 2017 said: "We congratulate the Syrian people and the Syrian Democratic Forces, including the Syrian Arab Coalition, on the liberation of Raqqa. The United States is proud to lead the 73-member Global Coalition that supported this effort, which has seen ISIS's self stated caliphate crumble across Iraq and Syria. Our work is far from over but the liberation of Raqqa is a critical milestone in the global fight against ISIS, and underscores the success of the ongoing international and Syrian effort to defeat these terrorists. [...] The Coalition will continue its relentless campaign to deny ISIS safe haven anywhere in the world, and sever its ability to recruit, move foreign terrorist fighters, transfer funds, and spread false propaganda over the internet and social media. We are confident that we will prevail and defeat this brutal terrorist organization." On 24 October 2017, the US Department of State's spokesperson said: "[...] Where we are right now is a tremendous success over ISIS in Raqqa. This is still a very long road ahead of us. [...] So it's a tremendous success that finally, under this administration, Raqqa was taken back, and I don't want us to lose focus on the significance of that. That's not a US success necessarily, although we were certainly part of that. It's a Syrian success for the Syrian people, and frankly, it's a success for all peace-loving people who want to do away with ISIS and see ISIS taken out."
Russia
Major-General Igor Konashenkov, chief spokesman for the Russian Defence Ministry, said: "Raqqa has inherited the fate of Dresden in 1945, wiped off the face of the Earth by Anglo-American bombardments." He also questioned the relative significance of Raqqa by pointing out the fact that prior to the war Deir ez-Zor had been a much bigger urban centre.
Syria
At the end of October 2017, the government of Syria issued a statement that said: "Syria considers the claims of the United States and its so-called alliance about the liberation of Raqqa city from ISIS to be lies aiming to divert international public opinion from the crimes committed by this alliance in Raqqa province. [...] more than 90% of Raqqa city has been leveled due to the deliberate and barbaric bombardment of the city and the towns near it by the alliance, which also destroyed all services and infrastructures and forced tens of thousands of locals to leave the city and become refugees. [...] Syria still considers Raqqa to be an occupied city, and it can only be considered liberated when the Syrian Arab Army enters it."

== See also ==
- 2017 Mayadin offensive
- Battle of Baghuz Fawqani
- Siege of Marawi
- Battle of Sirte (2016)
- Central Syria campaign
- Deir ez-Zor campaign (2017–2019)
- Manbij offensive (2016)
- Siege of Kobanî
- Tell Abyad offensive
- Western al-Hasakah offensive
