= Raqqa Internal Security Forces =

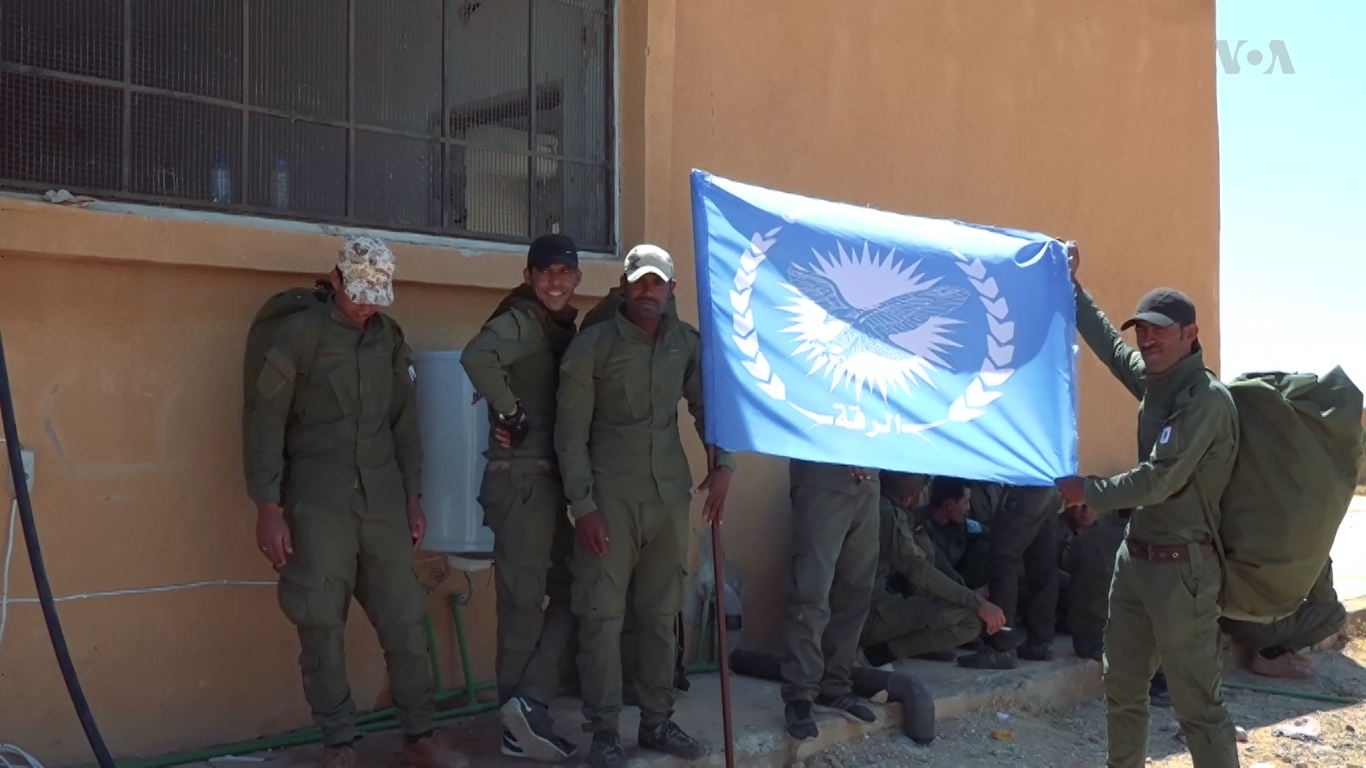
- Members of the unit showcase an Asayish flag.
- Active: 17 May 2017 – 18 January 2026
- Allegiance: Syrian Democratic Forces
- Type: Police
- Role: Security and policing
- Size: c. 1,200
- Part of: Internal Security Forces
- Garrison/HQ: Raqqa, Ayn Issa

Commanders
- General commander: Edrees Hamo ("Edrees Raqqa")
- Spokesman: Idris Muhammad

The Raqqa Internal Security Forces (RISF) (Arabic: قوات الأمن الداخلي في الرقة, romanized: Quwwāt al-ʾAmn ad-Dāḵilī fi'r-Raqqah) were a police unit that was formed in 2017 by the Syrian Democratic Forces, supported by the United States and Jordan, to handle the security in southern Raqqa Governorate, including Raqqa city, after the region's conquest from the Islamic State. The United States provide the majority of funding for the force and consider it to be part of the Syrian opposition. The RISF also have their own Quick Reaction Force.

== History ==
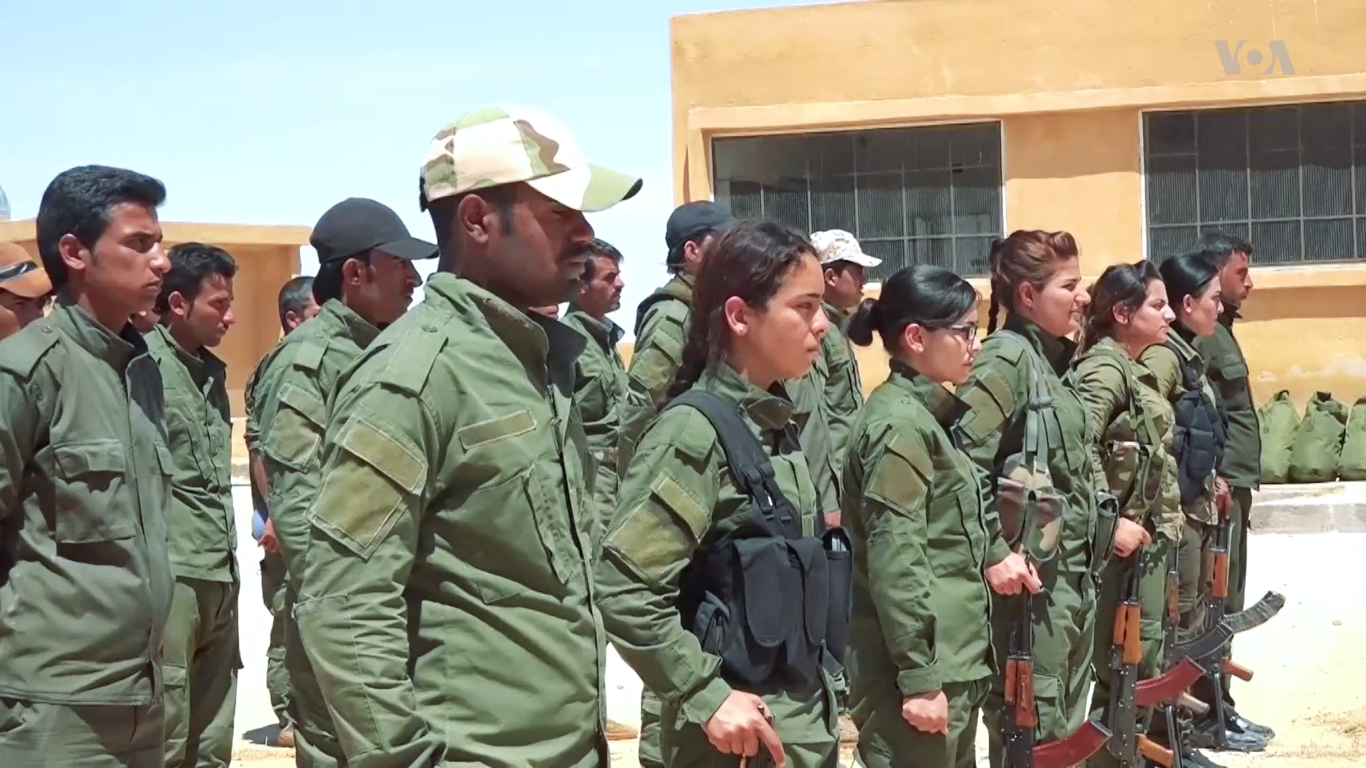
Members of the unit in Ayn Issa.

On 17 May 2017, the Raqqa Internal Security Forces (RISF) were established as new police unit, with the first training course being set up in Ayn Issa. The first 50 recruits were all Arab men and women, some of them former members of the Asayish, and trained by U.S. and Jordanian instructors "on how to conduct patrols, diffuse disputes, deal with car bombs and suicide bombers, and how to man a checkpoint". After the graduation of this first batch of police officers, the unit was gradually expanded, also recruiting Kurds; the long-term goal for the unit is to have at least 3,000 members in order to enforce law and order in Raqqa and restore stability.

The RISF further expanded on 20 July, as 250 more recruits finished their training; by this point, the unit had around 800 members and was already policing various areas in the Raqqa Governorate. By early August, 230 additional recruits graduated and joined the force, bringing it to around 850 members. Further 320 recruits completed their training in August. By 16 August, the RISF was around 80% Arab and 20% Kurdish according to CJTF–OIR.

RISF also began to release Islamic State members from prison who had only worked with, and not fought for, the organization. These pardons were facilitated by the Raqqa Civil Council, which wanted to gain the support of Raqqa Governorate's population, much of which had cooperated with or at least tolerated Islamic State.

After the end of the Battle of Raqqa in October 2017, the Syrian Democratic Forces gradually began to hand over security responsibilities in the city to the RISF, beginning with the al-Mashleb neighborhood in November. By December 2017, the Raqqa Internal Security Forces had also begun policing Ayn Issa and surrounding areas.

In May 2018, tensions built up between members of Arab tribes, most notably the Syrian Democratic Forces group Liwa Thuwar al-Raqqa, and the rest of the alliance and the RISF over recruitment issues in Raqqa. A curfew was put in place in both Raqqa city and the rest of the governorate on 23 June, as the Syrian Democratic Forces and RISF besieged Thuwar al-Raqqa's headquarters and arrested between 90 and 200 of its members the next day. By 25 June, the Syrian Democratic Forces and RISF had captured all of Thuwar al-Raqqa fighters and their weapons in Raqqa, completely defeating the group, and the curfew was ended.

== Gallery ==
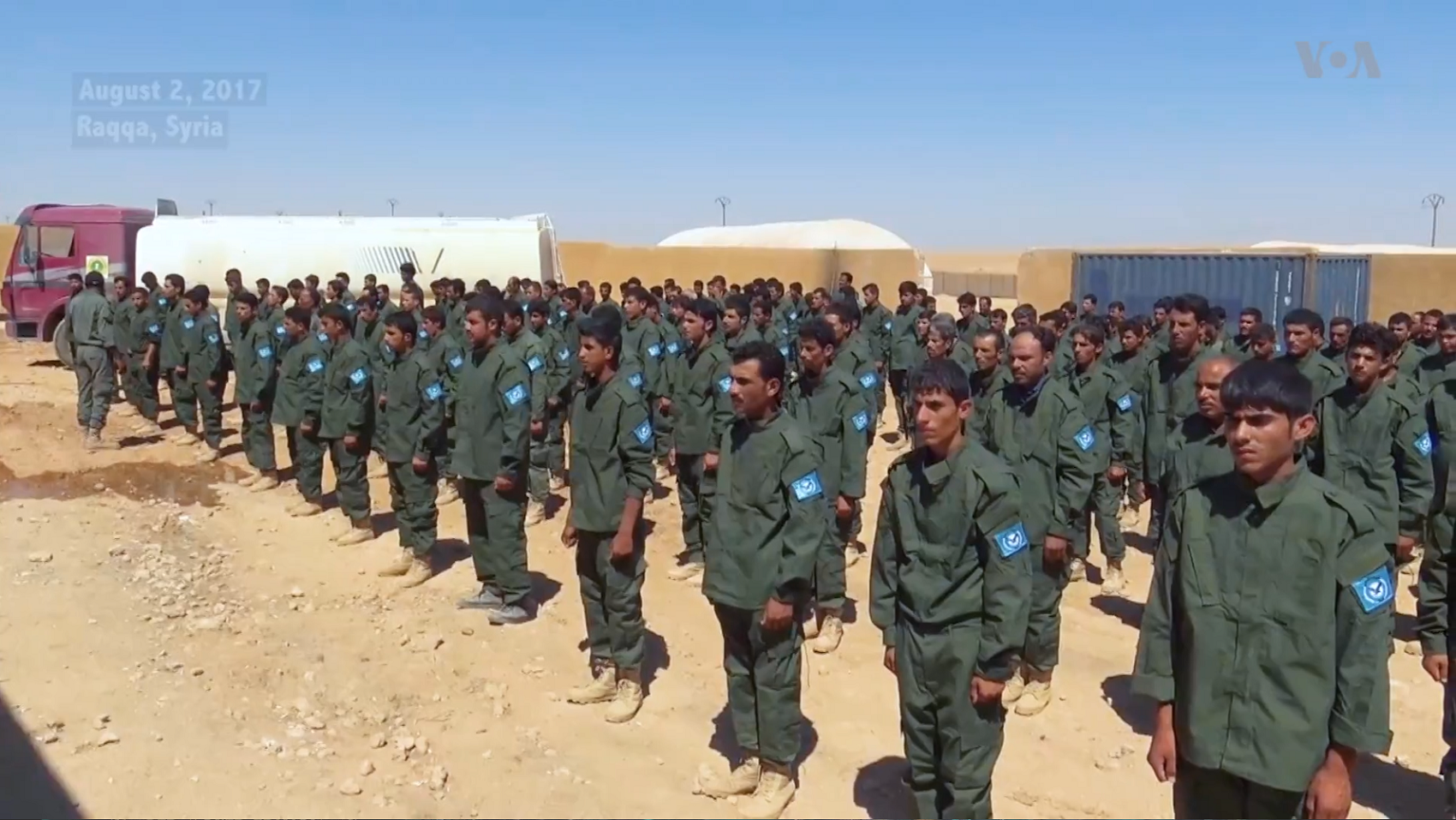
RISF recruits after the completion of their training

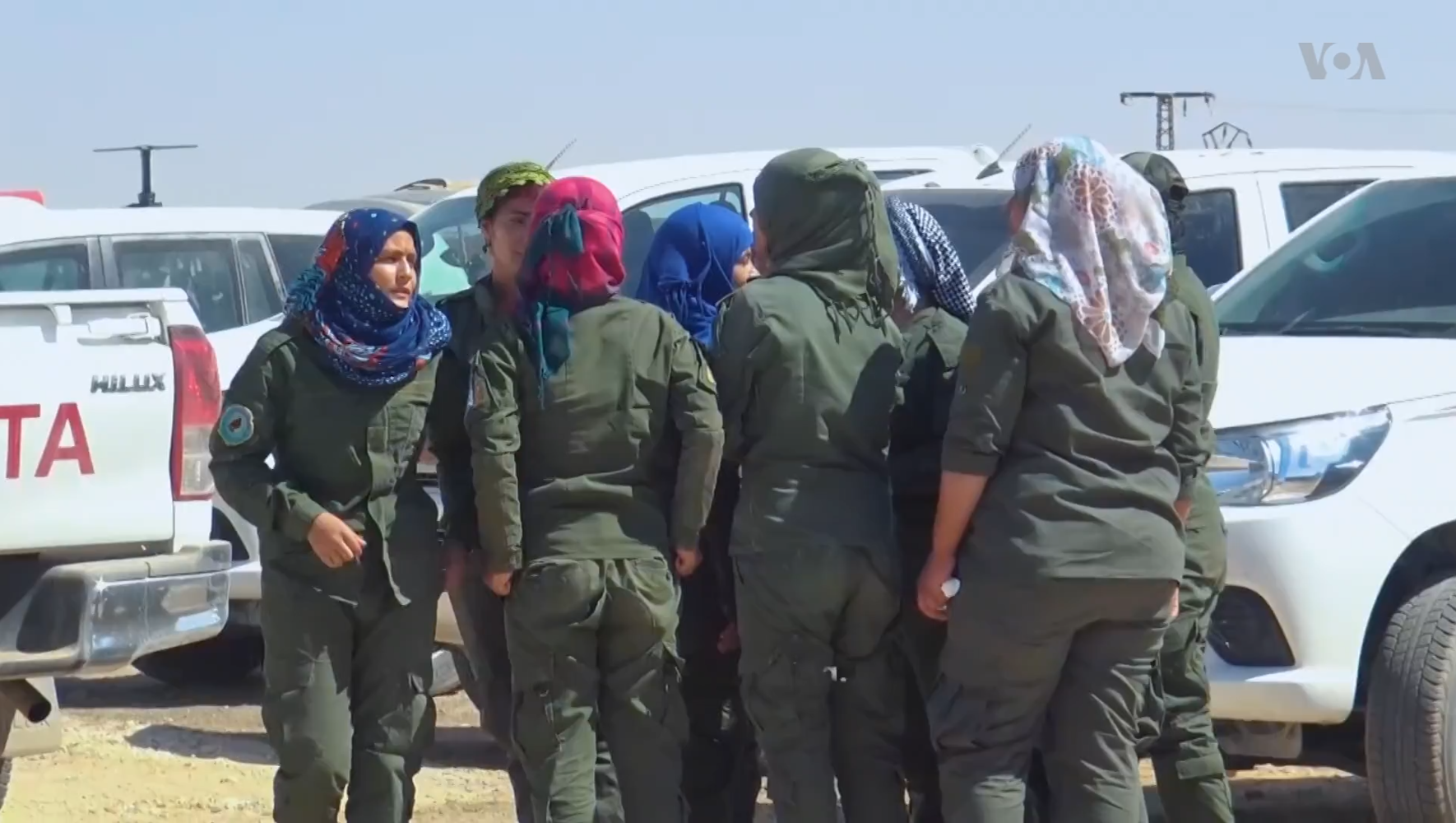
RISF policewomen

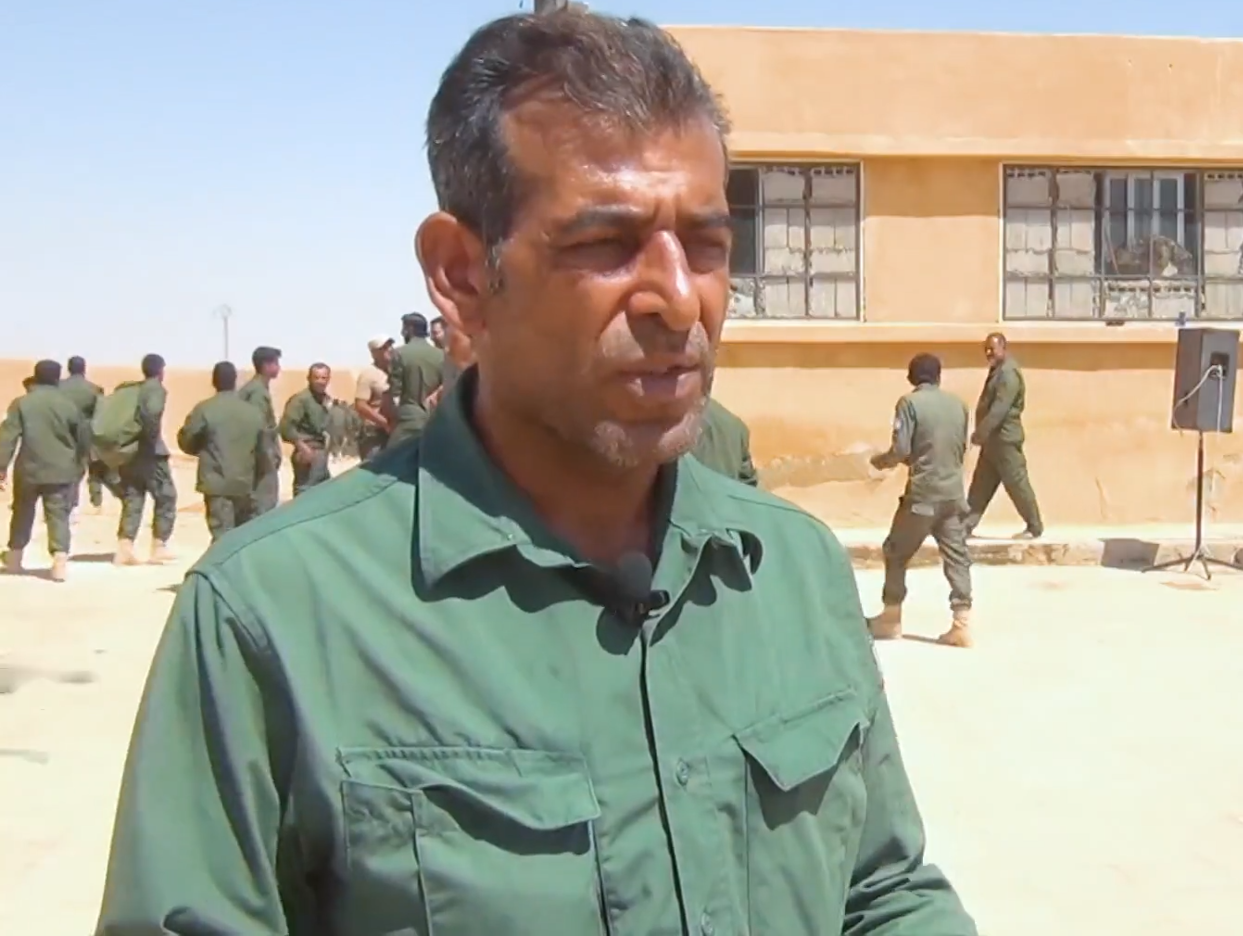
Idris Muhammad, spokesman of the RISF

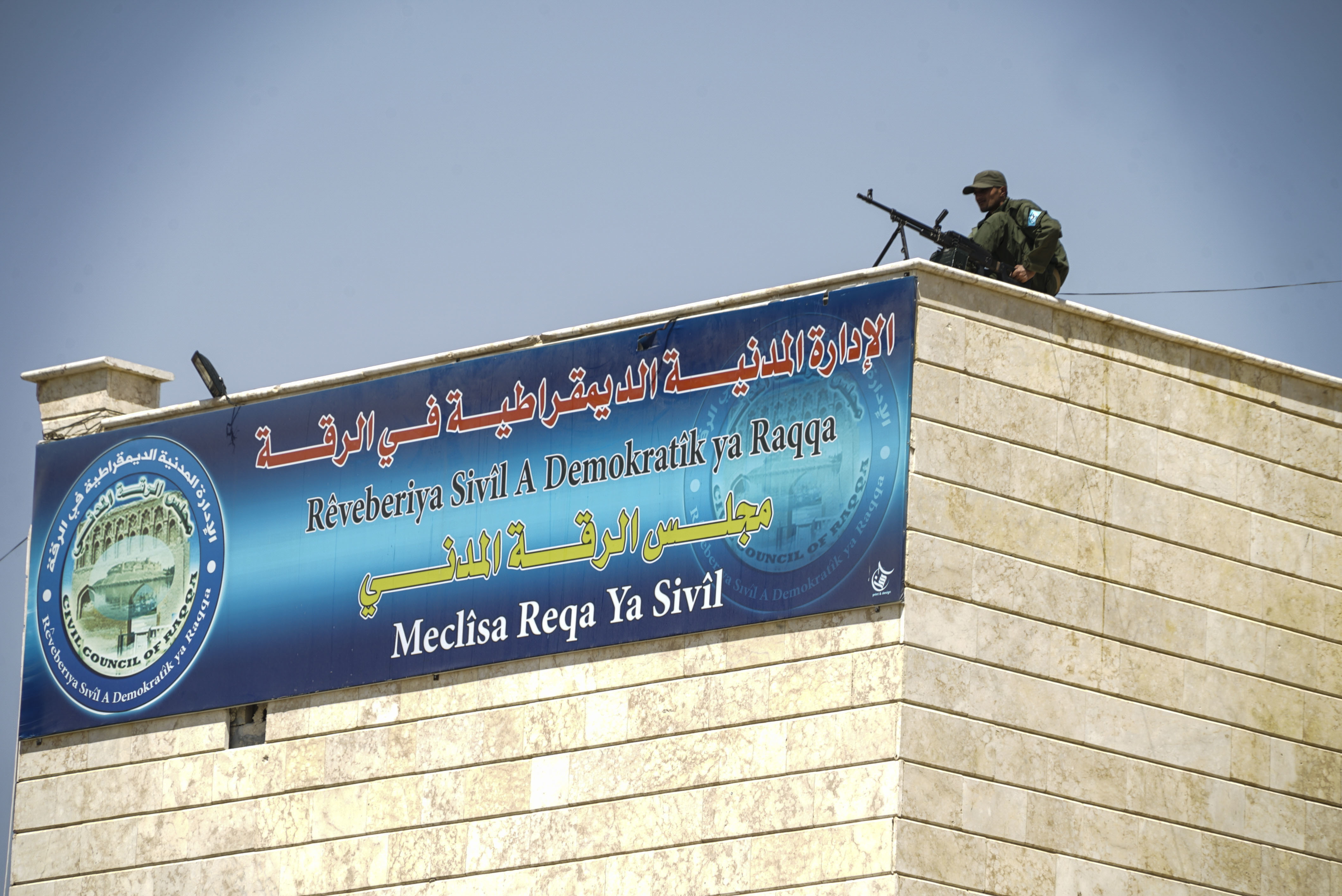
An RISF policeman providing security atop the Raqqa Civil Council building, 18 August 2018
