= Najim Abdullah al-Jubouri =

Iraqi military officer and politician (born 1956)

Major general Najim Abdullah al-Jubouri
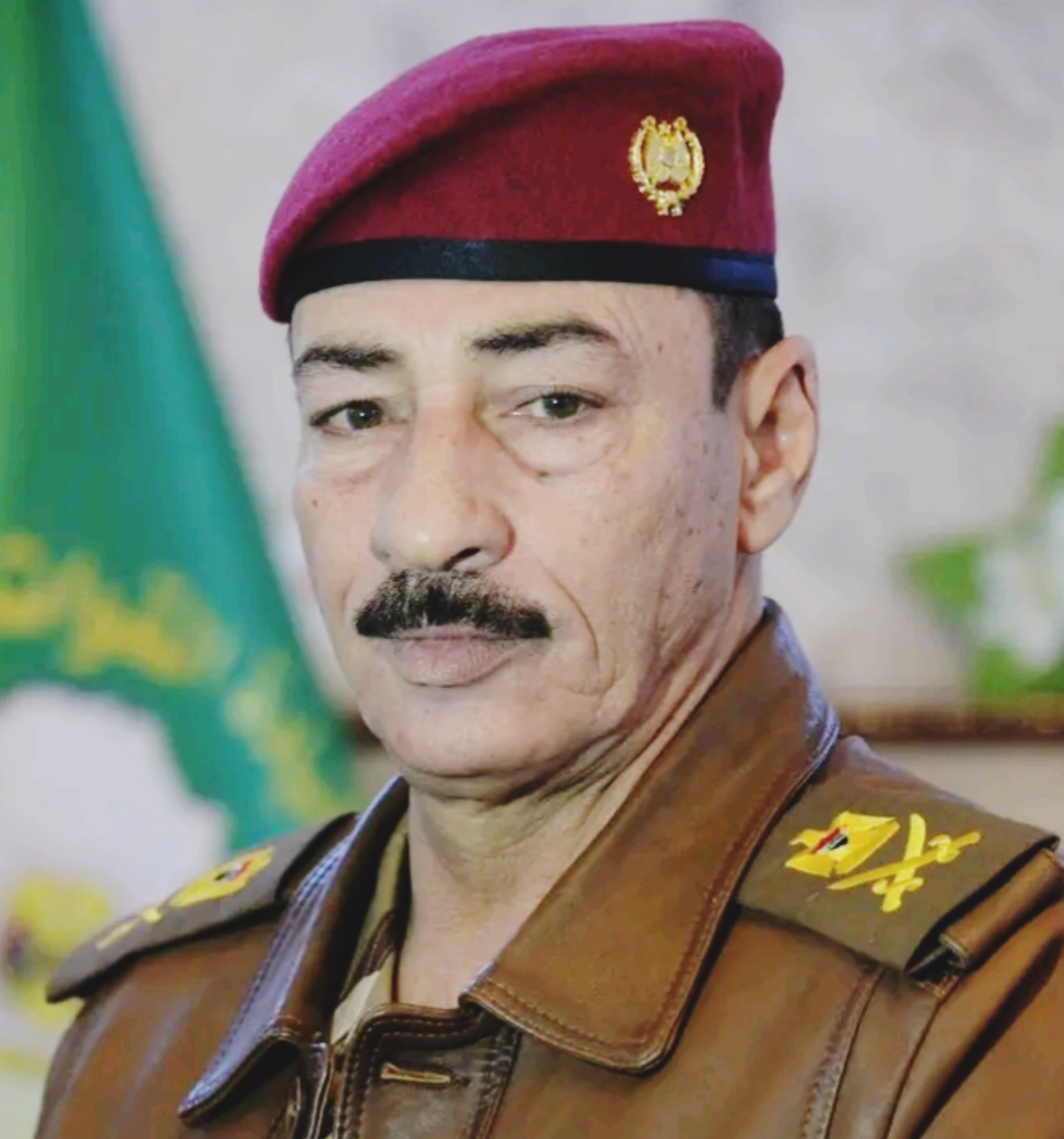

Governor of Nineveh Governorate
- In office 24 November 2019 – 26 November 2023
- Preceded by: Mansour Mar'ad
- Succeeded by: Abdul Qadir al-Dakhil

Personal details
- Born: 28 October 1956 (age 69) Qayyarah, Nineveh Governorate, Kingdom of Iraq

Military service
- Allegiance: Ba'athist Iraq (to 2003); Iraq
- Branch/service: Iraqi Ground Forces
- Years of service: 1976–2003; 2015–2019
- Rank: Major General
- Commands: Nineveh Operations Command
- Battles/wars: Iran–Iraq War; Gulf War; Iraq War; 2003 invasion of Iraq; Iraqi insurgency (2003–2011); War in Iraq (2013–2017); Mosul offensive (2016); Battle of Mosul

Najim Abdullah al-Jubouri (Arabic: نجيم عبدالله الجبوري; born 28 October 1956) is an Iraqi military officer and politician who served as the Governor of the Nineveh Province from 2019 to 2023. Jubouri rose to prominence during the War in Iraq (2013–2017), when he commanded the Iraqi Ground Forces in the Battle of Mosul.

== Early life and career ==
Jubouri was born on 28 October 1956 in Qayyarah, south of Mosul. He received his primary education in Samarra and Kut. He joined the military college in 1976 and graduated from the rank as first lieutenant later in 1979. He participated in Iran–Iraq War and the 1991 Gulf War. He continued to serve in the military until the US invasion of Iraq and subsequent fall of the Hussein regime in 2003. Jubouri had been a member of the air defense forces and held the rank of brigadier general.

== Post-Ba'athist Iraq ==
After the Ba'athist Iraqi Army, Jubouri initially served as the police commander in Tal Afar and worked with the U.S. 3rd Armored Cavalry Regiment when it was commanded by Colonel H. R. McMaster. Jubouri was mayor of the city of Tal Afar from June 2005 to 2008, and assisted coalition forces in counter-insurgency operations. His tenure there and cooperation with the U.S. has been described as one of the first clear victories over al-Qaeda in Iraq. He moved to the United States in 2008, having claimed asylum according to his account because he and his family were targeted by al-Qaeda, but returned to Iraq later in 2015 after living in Virginia for eight years. In 2009, he was a researcher at the National Defense University in Washington, D.C., after having graduated that same year. During his time in Washington he had worked with the Near East and Southeast Asia Center for Strategic Studies at the National Defense University, on the recommendation of H. R. McMaster.

In April 2015 he was recommissioned in the Iraqi Army as a major general and was named the commander of Nineveh Operations Command for the planned liberation of Mosul. Shortly before his return he was awarded an honorary degree from the United States Army Command and General Staff College. This was an unpopular choice in the Iraqi military because he had moved to the United States and was a former air defense officer with limited experience, leading to the belief that he was unqualified for the role. His selection also bypassed the military's process for senior appointments, in a decision made by Prime Minister Haidar al-Abadi. The perception among some Iraqi officials was that Jubouri received the role because the Iraqi administration was pressured by the United States, which preferred to work with him.

The first actions of the Iraqi ground forces led by Jubouri against the Islamic State in northern Iraq during early 2016 were unsuccessful. He remained in charge of operations in Nineveh during the Battle of Mosul in late 2016 and in 2017. In addition, while he was the head of Nineveh Operations Command, Jubouri tried to limit the influence of the Popular Mobilization Forces in the region, which included pro-Iranian elements. In May 2019, the Iraqi government announced that Jubouri would step down and retire from the military in June.

== Governor of Nineveh ==
He was appointed as Governor of Nineveh in 2019 and remained in office until his resignation in 2023. Jubouri was elected as governor on 24 November 2019, replacing Mansour Mar'ad, who took office following the removal of Nawfal Sultan by the Iraqi parliament earlier that year. He became governor as part of an anti-corruption purge of local officials by the Iraqi government between 2017 and 2019, after the region was liberated from ISIS. While in office he oversaw the reconstruction efforts in the Nineveh province in the aftermath of the war against the Islamic State.

Jubouri, as a former officer in the Ba'athist military, and the provincial police chief of Nineveh were investigated by the government under a 2008 law that prevents former members of the Ba'athist regime from holding political offices. The governor resigned on 26 November 2023, with his resignation accepted by the Prime Minister of Iraq, amidst allegations that he had been a member of the Iraqi Ba'ath Party when he was in the old military. According to the United States Ambassador to Iraq, Alina Romanowski, "a true patriot, he helped Iraq defeat ISIS and supported reconstruction work, including UNESCO efforts to rebuild historic sites in Mosul."

Military offices
Preceded by ??	Commander of Nineveh Operations Command; 2015–2019	Succeeded by Numan Abdul al-Zubai
Political offices
Preceded by Mansour Mar'ad	Governor of Nineveh Governorate; 2019–2023	Succeeded by Abdul Qadir al-Dakhil
