= Abu Khattab al-Tunisi =

Tunisian jihadist

- Native name: أبو خطاب التونسي
- Born: Tunisia
- Died: 10 June 2017 Raqqa, Syria
- Allegiance: Islamic State
- Branch: Military of the Islamic State
- Service years: ?–2017
- Rank: Third-highest ranking IS commander
- Conflicts: Syrian Civil War: Raqqa campaign (2016–2017); Battle of Raqqa (2017) †

Abu Khattab al-Tunisi (Arabic: أبو خطاب التونسي; died 10 June 2017) was a Tunisian jihadist and military leader of the Islamic State, who had risen to the group's third-highest ranking commander by 2017. In that year, he was put in charge of the military operations in eastern Raqqa, IS's proclaimed capital, which was attacked by the Syrian Democratic Forces on 6 June 2017. Just four days after the battle's beginning, Abu Khattab was killed at the frontlines in the Roman suburb, alongside 12 other IS militants, during a shootout with SDF fighters. His death was considered to be "a new blow to the ISIS terror group".
