= Êzîdxan Women's Units =

Yazidi all-women militia

- Yekinêyen Jinên Êzidxan (YJÊ)
- Flag of Sinjar Women's Units
- Leaders: Berivan Aslan (chief commander) Rosyar Vejin (Khanasor commander) "Koçber" (Manbij commander)
- Dates active: 2015–present
- Headquarters: Sinjar, Nineveh Governorate, Iraq
- Ideology: Democratic confederalism Yazidi regionalism Jineology
- Status: Active
- Part of: Sinjar Alliance
- Wars: Iraqi Civil War (2014–2017)

The Êzîdxan Women's Units (Kurdish: Yekinêyen Jinên Êzîdxan or YJÊ) is a Yazidi all-women militia formed in Iraq in 2015 to protect the Yazidi community in the wake of attacks by the Islamic State of Iraq and the Levant and other Islamist groups that view Yazidis as 'pagan infidels'.

An offshoot of the mixed-gender Yazidi militia Sinjar Resistance Units (YBŞ), the YJÊ was founded on 5 January 2015 under the original name of Yekîneyên Parastina Jin ê Şengalê (Kurdish: Sinjar Women's Protection Units, YJŞ), or YPJ-Sinjar. The militia adopted its current name on 26 October 2015.

The organization follows imprisoned PKK leader Abdullah Öcalan's feminist Jineology, and with the broader concept of democratic confederalism as advocated by the Group of Communities in Kurdistan (KCK).

== Activity ==
In October 2015, the YJÊ participated in the foundation of the Sinjar Alliance as an all-Yezidi joint commando umbrella structure, along with the Sinjar Resistance Units (YBŞ), the formerly Peshmerga-aligned Protection Force of Sinjar (HPŞ) and other, independent Yezidi units committed to the united Yezidi front.

Under the joint command of the newly founded Sinjar Alliance, the Êzidxan Women's Units took part in the November 2015 Sinjar offensive.

== See also ==
- Genocide of Yazidis by ISIL
- List of armed groups in the Iraqi Civil War
- November 2015 Sinjar offensive
- List of Yazidi settlements
