= Al-Shaddadi offensive (2016) =

Battle in 2016, during the Syrian civil war

Coordinates: 36.0561°N 40.7303°E

- Part of the Syrian Civil War and the American-led intervention in Syria
- Map of the frontline changes from 17 November 2015 – 20 February 2016 SDF control ISIL control Syrian Army control Ongoing confrontation or unclear situation
Date	16–24 February 2016 (1 week and 1 day)
Location	Southern Al-Hasakah Governorate, Syria
Result	Major SDF victory: SDF forces capture 315+ villages and hamlets, and 2 oil fields; The SDF captures al-Shaddadi city, and the towns of Sabaa, Al-Fadghami, and Al-Arishah; SDF forces capture over 2,400 square kilometers (1,491 square miles) of territory; ISIL releases the last 42 of the 287–400 Assyrian Christian hostages that they captured in February 2015

Belligerents
Syrian Democratic Forces; International Freedom Battalion; Airstrikes: CJTF–OIR	Islamic State

Commanders and leaders
Simko Çelê (YPG commander of Shaddadi operations); Rojda Felat (YPJ commander); Torhildan (YPJ commander); Alwan al-Shammari (Al-Sanadid Forces commander); Adnan Abu Amjad (Northern Sun Battalion deputy commander); Qehreman (Liberation Brigade commander-in-chief)	Abu Ali al-Anbari (Deputy, Syria); Abu Waheeb; Adam al-Chechani † (Top ISIL commander in Al-Hasakah Province); Abu Abeer al-Iraqi † (Deputy Emir of Al-Shaddadi); Abu Aicha al-Jazrawi † (Head of Sharia Court in Al-Shaddadi); Rima al-Jarish † (Propaganda Chief in northeastern Syria)

Units involved
Syrian Democratic Forces; YPG; YPJ; Al-Sanadid Forces; Jaysh al-Thuwar; Northern Sun Battalion; Liwa Thuwar al-Raqqa; Syriac Military Council (MFS); Bethnahrain Women's Protection Forces; Liberation Brigade; al-Jazeera brigades; International Freedom Battalion; United Freedom Forces; MLSPB-DC; Reconstrucción Comunista; TKP/ML TİKKO	(Islamic State) Military of ISIL: al-Barakah Province

Strength
SDF: 6,000 fighters (United States) US: Unknown	2,000+ fighters

Casualties and losses
26 fighters killed, 13+ injured	455+ militants killed
- 40 civilians killed by CJTF–OIR airstrikes 30,000+ people displaced and flee to ISIL territory

The al-Shaddadi offensive (2016), also known as Operation Wrath of Khabur, was an offensive launched by the Syrian Democratic Forces (SDF) during the Syrian Civil War, in February 2016. The main goal of this offensive was to capture the strategic city of Al-Shaddadi and the remainder of the southern al-Hasakah Governorate from the Islamic State (IS). During the offensive, the US-led coalition conducted more than 86 airstrikes in Al-Shaddadi and the nearby areas, in support of the SDF advances.

== Background ==
On 31 October 2015, the SDF launched an offensive to capture the town of al-Hawl and the surrounding countryside from ISIL. On 13 November, the SDF captured al-Hawl and the al-Hawl Refugee Camp, along with the areas to the east and south of the town, and on 16 November, the SDF captured a pocket of ISIL territory to the northwest of al-Hawl. On 22 November, the SDF captured the town of Kama'il, the Regiment 121 base, and the surrounding area. By 30 November, the SDF had captured the South Hasakah Dam and the village of Qana, coming within 25 kilometres (15.53 mi) of Al-Shaddadi from both the north and northeast. During the al-Hawl offensive, the SDF captured 1,400 square kilometers (870 square miles) of land, including more than 240 towns and villages. By 23 December, the SDF had captured the town of Al-Arishah. On the same day, the SDF repelled a pro-Assad militia attack on their positions in the town.

== The offensive ==
On 16 February 2016, the SDF launched an offensive to capture the strategic city of al-Shaddadi and the surrounding countryside, with a force of about 6,000 fighters. SDF forces attacked mainly from two axes, from the Abdul al-Aziz Mountains and from the al-Hawl area, advancing towards Shaddadi from the northwest and the northeast. On 18 February, the SDF captured at least eight villages and two other areas, including the villages of Mashtal and Mishwar, to the southwest of Al-Hawl. On the same day, the SDF also captured the Jabisah and Kabibah oil fields, both to the northeast of Al-Shaddadi. By this time, SDF forces had captured 48 villages and hamlets since the start of the offensive. At least 49 ISIL militants were killed, and another dozen were wounded in the clashes. 38 civilians were killed by US-led coalition airstrikes.

On 19 February 2016, the SDF cut off the al-Shaddadi–al-Baaj road, capturing multiple villages in the process, including: Dilan, Simalka, Ballouna, Dabshi, Meshal, Mashwar, Khirba, Givara, Umm Tanak, Umm Bouja, and Misherfa. On the same day, the SDF reached the northeastern entrance of Al-Shaddadi, and they also advanced within 3 kilometers of Al-Shaddadi's northwestern outskirts, capturing the town of Sabaa. SDF forces also captured another 47 villages around Al-Shaddadi, and fully besieged the city. This also trapped many ISIL fighters in a pocket of villages between Al-Arishah and Al-Shaddadi.

Later on 19 February, al-Shaddadi was captured by the Syrian Democratic Forces, A US-led coalition airstrike also killed several high-ranking ISIL leaders in Al-Shaddadi on 19 February. On the same day, a YPG position to the east of Al-Hasakah was bombed by an unidentified jet, killing three YPG fighters and wounding two others.

On 20 February, the SDF advanced further south of al-Shaddadi and captured the village of al-Alwa, as well as the town of al-Fadghami. SDF forces also captured 12 farms and villages during this advance. This left Markada as the last town controlled by ISIL in the Al-Hasakah Governorate. On the same day, the SDF celebrated capturing Al-Shaddadi from ISIL.

On 21 February, violent clashes erupted, after ISIL attempted to infiltrate an area in the al-Shaddadi countryside. On the same day, SDF forces advanced further southward, coming within 16 kilometers (10 miles) of the Deir ez-Zor Governorate. A pro-Kurdish source claimed the SDF also reportedly captured the town of Markada, although this was not independently confirmed. At least 64 ISIL militants were killed in the clashes. It was also reported that the SDF found and eliminated three separate groups of ISIL militants that were hiding in Al-Shaddadi city, and that ISIL was sending reinforcements from the Deir ez-Zor Governorate to prevent further SDF advances. Later on the same day, the SDF released an operations statement sheet, declaring that they had liberated 2,400 square kilometers (1,491 square miles) of land from ISIL forces. The SDF began cleanup operations to remove the mines and booby traps left behind by ISIL, and to sweep the countryside for any remaining ISIL militants.

Late on 21 February, ISIL forces launched a counterattack, in an attempt to recapture the city, re-entering Al-Shaddadi's western and southern suburbs, and recapturing the town of Sabaa. However, SDF forces managed to repel the attack and recaptured Sabaa; 11 SDF fighters and seven ISIL militants were reported killed in the clashes. Afterwards, SDF fighters began fortifying Al-Shaddadi, to protect against future attacks. The SDF also stated that they would never give up control of the city to ISIL, and that they would work to push ISIL out of the entire Al-Hasakah Province and keep them from returning. Early on 22 February, ISIL launched another counterattack on Al-Shaddadi's southern outskirts, resulting in additional clashes, before they were repelled by the SDF once again. Early on 23 February, SDF forces recaptured the Jabisah oil field, following an earlier ISIL counterattack. Clashes also erupted to the south of Al-Shaddadi.

On 22 February, ISIL also released the last 42 survivors of their 350–400 Assyrian Christian hostages that they had captured from the Khabur Valley region, during a previous offensive in February 2015, after they had spent nearly a full year in captivity. It was also reported that half of Al-Shaddadi had been cleared of the bombs left behind by ISIL. Later on the same day, ISIL's forces in the southern countryside of Al-Shaddadi were reported to have collapsed and retreated back to the Markada District. Early on 24 February, the SOHR reported that two more civilians had been killed by US-led coalition airstrikes near Al-Shaddadi, while clashes continued south of Al-Shaddadi. Additionally, four YPG fighters, one of them a German volunteer, were killed in the Al-Shaddadi countryside during clashes with ISIL. Later on the same day, it was reported that 120 ISIL militants had been found and killed, during a clearing operation in a village south of Al-Shaddadi. Late on 24 February, it was reported that the SDF had ended their offensive operations, after they completely secured and demined the city of Al-Shaddadi, along with the surrounding countryside, including the pocket between Al-Arishah and Al-Shaddadi. By the end of the offensive, the SDF had captured 315+ villages and 2,400+ square kilometers (1,491+ square miles) of land from ISIL. It was later revealed that during the offensive, a small number of US commanders had traveled to the frontlines to help advise SDF forces, and to coordinate airstrikes.

== Strategic analysis ==
The capture of al-Shaddadi left the ISIL capital city of Raqqa as the only major ISIL stronghold near SDF-held territories in northeastern Syria. The capture of al-Shaddadi was considered to be a major victory for the SDF and the US-led Coalition, because Al-Shaddadi was the city from which ISIL had planned all of its attacks on Kurdish-held territories in the Al-Hasakah Province, and because Al-Shaddadi was also the last major hub on the Syrian side of the Mosul-Raqqa route, following the capture of al-Hawl. Although the SDF managed to sever another key supply route between Raqqa and Mosul, Coalition Spokesman Col. Christopher Garver noted that ISIL could still switch to using multiple other goat trails and desert roads, even though those routes would be much harder to navigate. ISIL's sudden collapse in al-Shaddadi was described as "swift and surprising," and the withdrawal was thought to be due to ISIL's tactical reasoning or an attempt to alarm Turkey with rapid Kurdish advances. In late March 2016, US officials revealed that the Al-Shaddadi offensive had originally been planned as a 6-week-long operation, but instead, ISIL forces there collapsed within days.

== Aftermath ==
On 1 August 2016, a motorcycle bomb blew up at an Internet café in Shaddadi, killing at least 4 civilians.

On 26 August, ISIL forces launched a counterattack on the southern Shaddadi countryside after shelling and detonating 2 car bombs at SDF positions, reportedly capturing 3 villages in the area. ISIL conducted another attack on the city's suburbs on 11 September, but the attack was repelled by the SDF.

== See also ==
- November 2015 Sinjar offensive
- Al-Hasakah offensive (May 2015)
- Battle of Sarrin (June–July 2015)
- Battle of Al-Hasakah (June–August 2015)
- Tishrin Dam offensive
- Northern Raqqa offensive (May 2016)
- Manbij offensive (2016)
- List of wars and battles involving ISIL
