= 2015 al-Hawl offensive =

Offensive during the Syrian Civil War

Coordinates: 36.3899°N 41.1477°E

Al-Hawl offensive (2015)
- Part of the Syrian Civil War and the American-led intervention in Syria
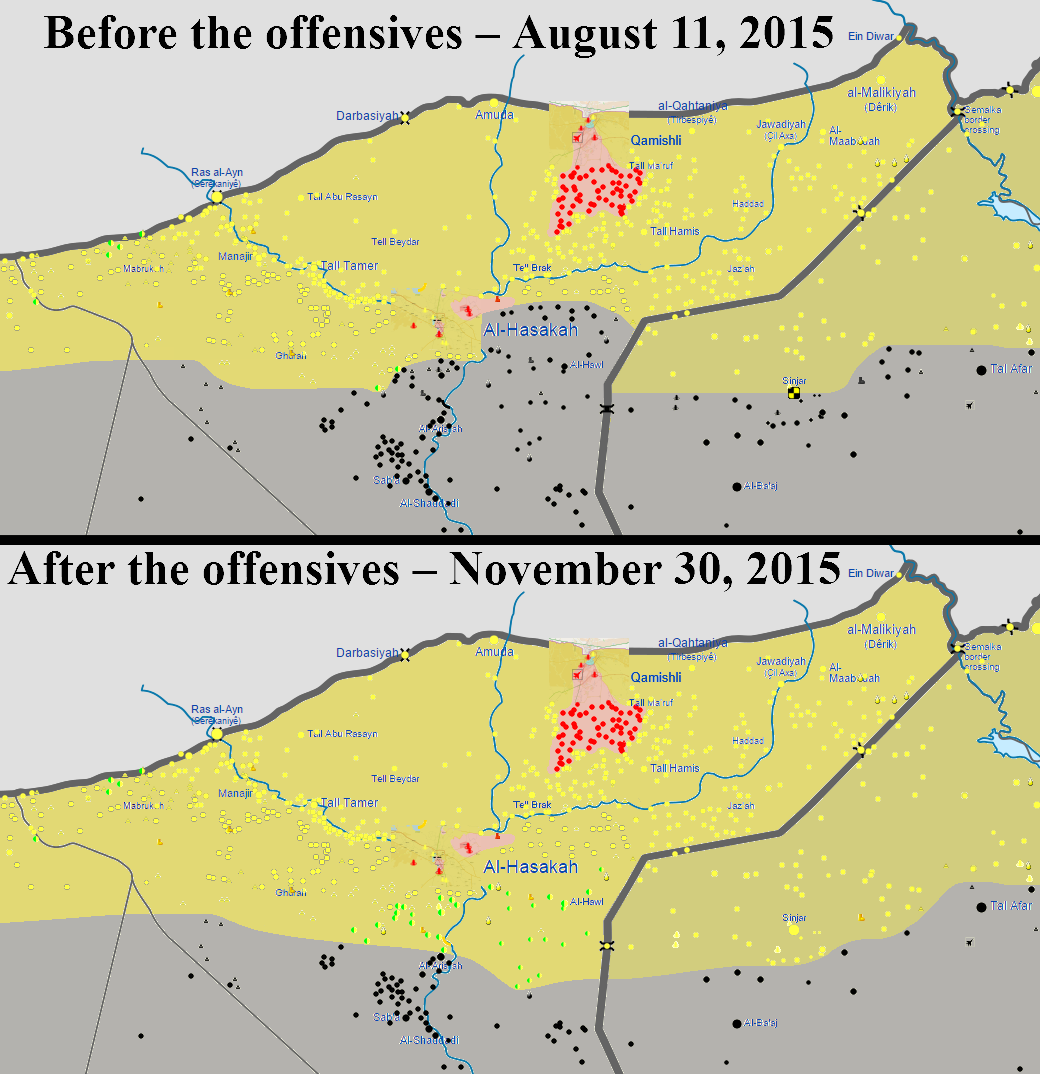
- Map of the territorial changes during the concurrent offensives in Al-Hawl and Sinjar.
Date	31 October – 30 November 2015 (4 weeks and 2 days)
Location	Eastern Al-Hasakah Governorate, Syria
Result	SDF victory: SDF forces capture Al-Hawl, 240+ towns and villages, 2 oil fields, two gas stations, the Regiment 121 base, the South Hasakah Dam, six border posts, and one hill; SDF forces capture 1,400 square kilometres (870 square miles) of territory

Belligerents
Syrian Democratic Forces; International Freedom Battalion; Sinjar Resistance Units Airstrikes: CJTF–OIR	Islamic State

Commanders and leaders
Torhildan (YPJ commander); Haqi Kobani (YPG commander); Alwan al-Shammari (Al-Sanadid Forces commander); Adnan al-Ahmad (Northern Sun Battalion commander-in-chief); Adnan Abu Amjad (Northern Sun Battalion second-in-command); Col. Talal Ali Sulo (Seljuq Brigade leader); Khalil Iskander (al-Qa'qa Brigade commander) (Syrian opposition) Qehreman (Al-Tahrir Brigade commander-in-chief); Hêvî Sarya (MLKP commander)	Abu Ali al-Anbari (Deputy, Syria) Adam al-Shishani (Top ISIL commander in Al-Hasakah Province); Unknown Dagestani ISIL leader †

Units involved
Syrian Democratic Forces; YPG; YPJ; Al-Sanadid Forces; Jaysh al-Thuwar; Northern Sun Battalion; Kurdish Front Brigade; Seljuq Brigade; al-Qa'qa' Brigade; Liwa Thuwar al-Raqqa; MFS; HSNB; (Syrian opposition) Al-Tahrir Brigade; Brigade Groups of Al-Jazira; International Freedom Battalion; MLKP; Martyr Serkan Battalion; Devrimci Karargâh; United Freedom Forces; MLSPB-DC; TKP/ML TİKKO	(Islamic State) Military of ISIL: al-Barakah Province

Strength
2,700+ fighters	1,000+ fighters

Casualties and losses
33 killed	493+ killed (per the SDF)
- 4–8 civilians killed by CJTF–OIR airstrikes

The 2015 al-Hawl offensive was an offensive launched by the Syrian Democratic Forces (SDF) during the Syrian Civil War, in order to capture the strategic town of al-Hawl and the surrounding countryside from the Islamic State of Iraq and the Levant (ISIL). The offensive consisted of separate operations in three different areas: Tell Brak, al-Hawl, and the southern al-Hasakah city countryside.

== Background ==
US air support was limited during the early part of the offensive due to the US reducing bombing activity after the Kunduz hospital airstrike.

== The offensive ==
=== Al-Hawl ===
The offensive was launched on 31 October 2015.

During the first week of the offensive, SDF forces captured a number of villages and other positions from ISIL near Al-Hawl, and to the southeast of Al-Hasakah city. ISIL responded by detonating a number of VBIED's. One of those VBIED's targeted an SDF convoy, killing and wounding dozens of fighters. A Canadian SDF fighter was among the SDF casualties that week. He was first reported to have been killed by an ISIL suicide bomber in a farm that was contested. However, it was later reported that he died due to blood loss caused by a bullet in his hip. A Dagestani ISIL leader was also killed that week. The SDF claimed that they were in control of 12 new villages since the start of the offensive. On 6 November, SDF forces captured the area around the village of Nazilah, including the Tishreen Oil Field.

The second week started with SDF forces seizing parts of the Al-Hasakah–Al-Shaddadi road and two villages from ISIL. By this time, the SDF forces had reportedly captured over 36 villages, 350 square kilometers of land, and killed 178 ISIL militants. Two days later, SDF forces seized a hill and two vehicles from ISIL.

On 11 November, the SDF continued its offensive and captured al-Khatuniyah, northeast of Al-Hawl, while also advancing in the southern countryside of Al-Hasakah city. At least 7 SDF fighters were killed in the clashes. The next day, SDF captured two villages and weaponry from ISIL, while at least 14 ISIL militants were killed by U.S. airstrikes.

On 13 November, SDF forces captured the town of Al-Hawl, killing dozens of ISIL militants and seizing large quantities of weapons and ammunition left behind.

On 14 November, SDF forces captured three villages around Mount Abdulaziz, and also advanced near the Tishreen Oil Field, while ISIL detonated an VBIED near Al-Hawl. On the next day, four ISIL militants and one SDF fighter were killed, while a new VBIED was detonated. On 15 November, SDF forces captured Abu Hajirat Khuatana, Khuwaytilah, and the Al-Hawl Grain Silos, allowing the SDF to capture a pocket of ISIL-controlled area to the northwest of Al-Hawl.

On 16 November, SDF forces captured the Al-Hawl Oil Field, to the southwest of Al-Hawl. By 16 November, SDF forces had captured nearly 200 villages, reportedly seizing 1,362 square kilometres (545 square miles) of territory. According to the SDF, 493 ISIL militants, 33 SDF fighters, and four civilians were killed during the operation.

=== Southern Al-Hasakah city countryside ===
On 17 November, SDF forces began advancing on the Regiment 121 base from the east. On 22 November, SDF forces captured the Regiment 121 base, Khama'il, the al-Melabiyyah granaries, the cotton factory, and the villages around it.

During the next week, the SDF continued their offensive, advancing from the Regiment 121 base to the south, and from Al-Hawl towards the southwest, capturing multiple villages in the southern Al-Hasakah countryside and along the Sinjar-Al-Shaddadi road (Highway 47). On 22 November, SDF reached the northern part of the South Hasakah Dam, capturing the neighboring village of Taban. On 25 November, SDF forces captured the village of Ghunah, near the Jabisah Oil Field, to the southwest of Al-Hawl, and severing a segment of Highway 715. On 30 November, SDF forces captured Umm Madhah, and they also captured the South Hasakah Dam and the nearby village of Qana, bringing SDF forces within 25 kilometres (15.53 mi) of Al-Shaddadi from the north and the northeast. Eventually, it was revealed that the SDF had captured 240+ towns and villages during the entire operation.

== Aftermath ==
After the SDF captured the South Hasakah Dam on 30 November, the SDF continued their offensive southward, towards the city of Al-Shaddadi, ISIL's last stronghold in the Al-Hasakah Province. On 1 December, Arab tribal leaders were reportedly urging ISIL to withdraw from the city "peacefully," in order to prevent civilian casualties and the possible collapse of the economic infrastructure in Al-Shaddadi, if a destructive battle between the SDF/Coalition forces and ISIL were to occur. It was also reported that ISIL was beginning to evacuate some of its positions near Al-Shaddadi, and that some ISIL militants were moving their families from the area to ISIL-held territories in the Deir ez-Zor Province, in preparation for the upcoming battle.

On 7 December US airstrikes killed at least 36 civilians, including 20 children, in the town of al-Khan, near al-Hawl.

On 14 December 2015, SDF forces began to heavily shell the ISIL headquarters in the town of Al-Arishah, in preparation for storming the town. By 23 December, the SDF had captured the town of Al-Arishah. However, on 23 December, pro-Assad militias attacked the SDF headquarters in Al-Arishah, but the SDF was able to repel the attack. The attack came after the pro-Assad militias had allegedly warned ISIL about a potential offensive on Al-Shaddadi, and urged civilians in Al-Shaddadi to resist any Kurdish offensive, earlier in the week.

On 27 January 2016, it was reported that ISIL had banned civilians from leaving Al-Shaddadi, in an attempt to use them as human shields in the event of an SDF offensive on the city. It was also reported that food and other basic supplies were running out in Al-Shaddadi. On 31 January 2016, the US-led Coalition bombed 3 ISIL checkpoints in their stronghold of Al-Shaddadi, killing 14+ ISIL militants.

On 16 February 2016, the SDF launched an offensive to capture the strategic city of Al-Shaddadi and the surrounding countryside.

On 19 February, the SDF captured Al-Shaddadi city and the surrounding countryside.

On 20 February, the SDF advanced further southward, capturing the town of Al-Fadghami. On February 21, SDF forces advanced further southward, coming within 16 kilometers (10 miles) of the Deir ez-Zor Governorate, and capturing the town of Markada. During the offensive, the SDF liberated 2,400 square kilometers (1,491 square miles) of land from ISIL forces.

== See also ==
- November 2015 Sinjar offensive
- Al-Hasakah offensive (May 2015)
- Battle of Sarrin (June–July 2015)
- Battle of Al-Hasakah (June–August 2015)
- Tishrin Dam offensive
- List of wars and battles involving ISIL
