= Tell Safouk =

Tell Safouk تل صفوك
- Village
- Location of Tell Safouk in Syria
- Coordinates: 36°3′15″N 41°12′18″E
- Country: Syria
- Governorate: al-Hasakah
- District: al-Shaddadah
- Subdistrict: Markada

Population (2004)
  - Total: 5,781
- Time zone: UTC+3 (AST)
- Geocode: C4450

Tell Safouk (Arabic: تل صفوك) is a town in southern al-Hasakah Governorate, northeastern Syria.

Administratively the village belongs to the Nahiya Markada of al-Shaddadah District. At the 2004 census, it had a population of 5,781.
