= Democratic Conservative Party (Syria) =

Democratic Conservative Party Arabic: حزب المحافظين الديمقراط
- Secretary-General: Humaydi Daham al-Hadi
- Founded: 2017
- Paramilitary wing: None official; de facto al-Sanadid Forces
- Ideology: Conservatism; Arab tribal interests Economic liberalism Anti-racism
- National affiliation: Democratic Nation List
- People's Council: 0 / 250

Website
- Facebook

The Democratic Conservative Party (Arabic: حزب المحافظين الديمقراط), also known simply as the Conservative Party, is a political party founded in 2017 that operates in Rojava, a de facto autonomous region in northeastern Syria.

== History ==
The Democratic Conservative Party emerged in the context of the Syrian Civil War. In course of this conflict, the Syrian government lost control of the country's northeast, where the mostly Kurdish Democratic Union Party (PYD) assumed power. It founded an unrecognized proto-state, widely known as "Rojava", with its own constitution, government, and military. In order to safeguard and expand this proto-state and gain recognition and acceptance among the region's population of Kurds, Arabs, and other ethnic as well as religious groups, the PYD forged alliances with other regional actors. One of the PYD's most important allies was the Syrian branch of the Shammar tribe, led by Humaydi Daham al-Hadi. He organized a tribal militia, known as Army of Dignity and later al-Sanadid Forces, to fight alongside the PYD's armed wings (YPG/YPJ) against other militant groups during the civil war.

In August 2017, Humaydi Daham al-Hadi met at Qamishli with representatives of several Arab tribes that lived in Rojava's Jazira Region. Anticipating the upcoming regional elections, the tribal representatives agreed to organize a party which they dubbed the "Democratic Conservative Party" with the motto "Syria is a homeland for all Syrians." Humaydi Daham al-Hadi was chosen as secretary general, and Akram Mahshoush, a Jubur tribal leader, was appointed deputy secretary general. The party participated in the regional elections of December 2017 as part of the PYD-led Democratic Nation List. Since then, the party established a presence throughout the Jazira Region, such as at al-Qahtaniyah, but also in other areas including Raqqa.

The party sent representatives to the "Meeting and Progress" Dialogue in late 2018, and the 2nd Middle East Youth Conference at Kobanî on 20 February 2019. It has repeatedly voiced support for talks between the northeastern administration under the PYD and the Syrian government, and has condemned the Turkish occupation of northern Syria. In March 2020, the Democratic Conservative Party was one of 31 parties which signed a statement rebuffing President Bashar al-Assad's claim that the ruling elements in northeastern Syria did not represent the area's majority.

== See also ==
- List of political parties in Rojava
