= Saba'a Stele =

C. 800 BC boundary stone inscription

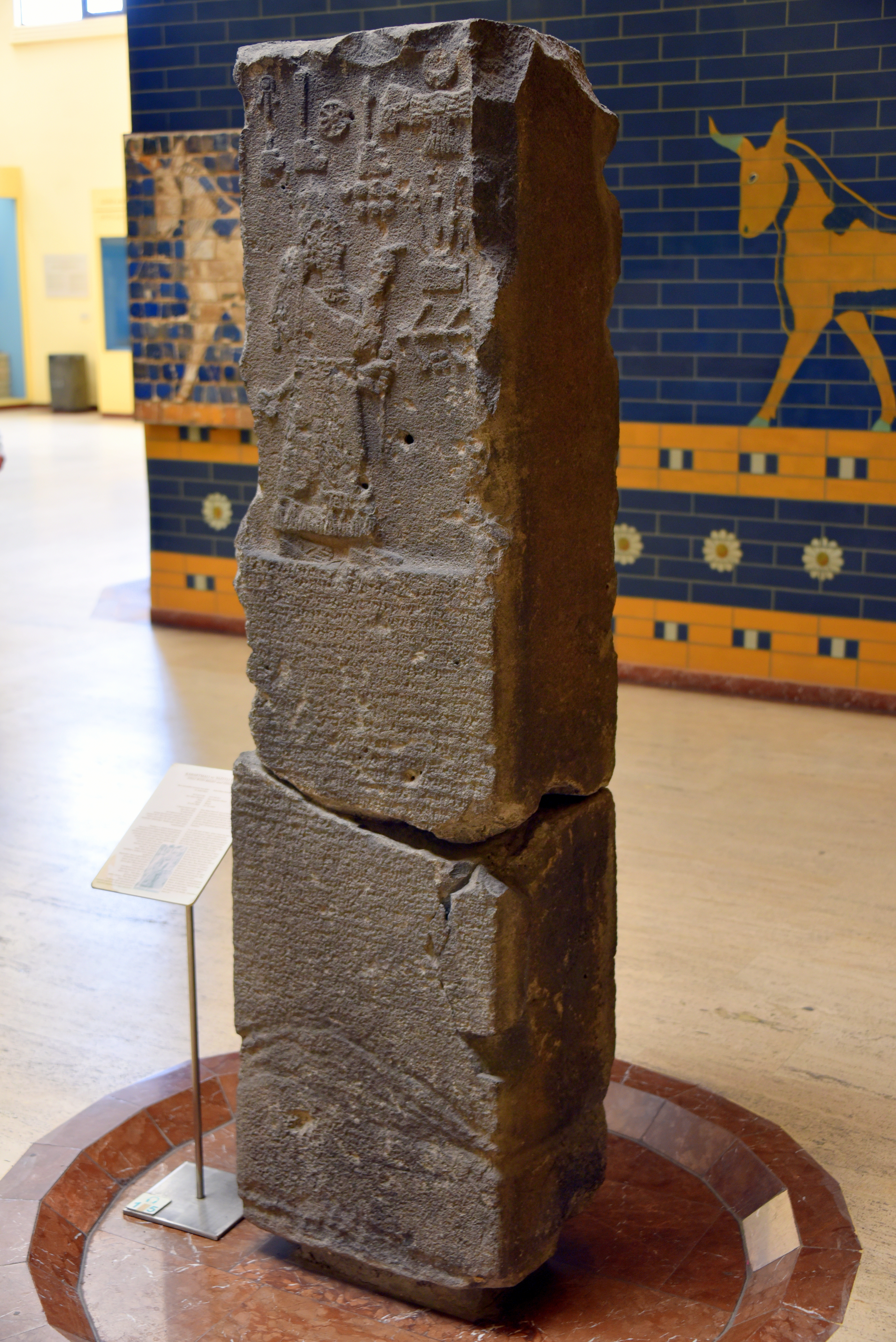
- The stele in its current location
- Material: Basalt
- Writing: Akkadian cuneiform
- Created: c. 800 BC
- Discovered: 1905; Al-Sabaa wa Arbain, Al-Hasakah, Syria
- Present location: Istanbul Archaeology Museums

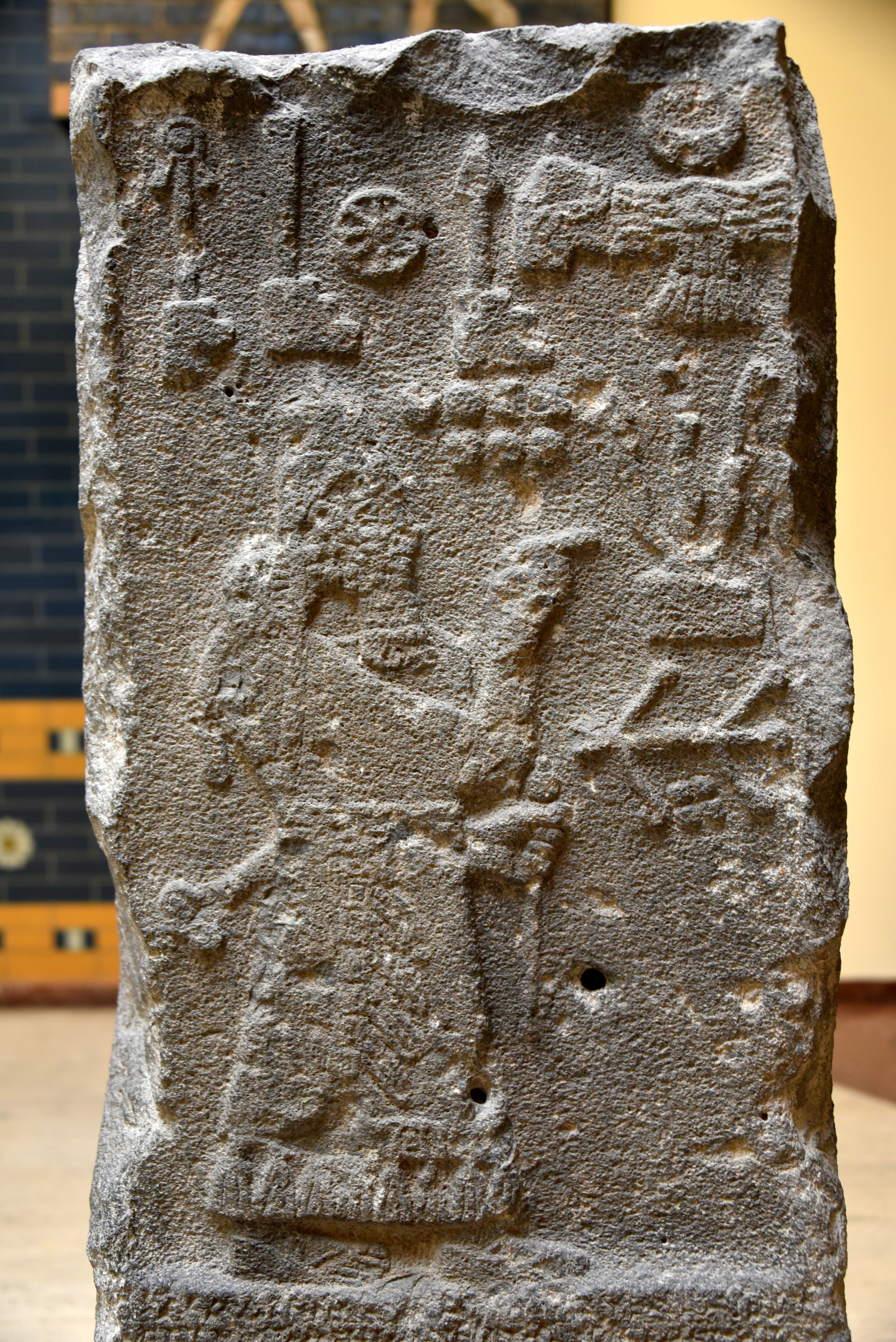
Adad-nirari III prays in front of Mesopotamian divine symbols. Upper part of the stele

The Saba'a Stele, also known as the Saba'a Inscription, is a boundary stone inscription of the reign of Adad-nirari III (811 to 783 BC) discovered in 1905 in two pieces in Saba'a, Sanjak of Zor, south of the Sinjar Mountains in modern Syria. It is the primary source for the military campaigns of Adad-nirari III.

The stele was erected by one of Adad-Nirari's officers, Nergalerish. The text consists of 33 lines in seven sections: a dedication, the genealogy of Adad-Nirari III, a description of Adad-Nirari III's campaign to Palestine in year 5, a tribute from Mari, King of Damascus, erection of a statue in Zabanni, introduction of Nergalerish and curses.

The third section, describing a campaign in year 5, has received the most focus from scholars. The text as translated by Daniel David Luckenbill as below:

In the fifth year (of my official rule) I sat down solemnly on my royal throne and called up the country (for war). I ordered the numerous army of Assyria to march against Paláštu. I crossed the Euphrates at its flood. As to the numerous hostile kings who had rebelled in the time of my father Shamshi-Adad (i.e. Shamshi-Adad V) and had wi[thheld] their regular (tributes), [the terror-inspiring glam] or overwhelmed them (and) upon the command of Asur, Sin, Shamash, Adad (and) Ishtar, my trust (-inspiring) gods, they seized my feet (in submission). I received all the tributes ... which they brought to Assyria. I (then) ordered [to march] against the country Damascus (Ša-imērišu).

The term "Pa-la-áš-tu" had long been translated as Philistia by scholars. More recent scholarship, finding the use of West Semitic š instead of Assyrian s as in the Nimrud Slab to be problematic, and comparing the description to contemporaneous events described in the Tell al-Rimah stela, have replaced reading Philistia with "the land of Hatti".

== See also ==
- Calah Slab
- Tell al-Rimah stela
