= Al-Shaddadah Subdistrict =

Al-Shaddadah Subdistrict ناحية الشدادي Nahiye Şeddadê
- Subdistrict
- Location of Al-Shaddadah Subdistrict within al-Hasakah Governorate

- Location in Syria
- Coordinates (al-Shaddadah): 36.0522°N 40.7717°E
- Country: Syria
- Governorate: Hasakah
- District: Hasakah District
- Seat: al-Shaddadah

Area
  - Total: 1,935.05 km^{2} (747.13 sq mi)

Population (2004)
  - Total: 58,916
  - Density: 30.447/km^{2} (78.857/sq mi)
- Geocode: SY080002

Al-Shaddadah Subdistrict (Arabic: ناحية الشدادي; Kurdish: Nahiye Şeddadê) is a subdistrict of al-Shaddadah District in southern Hasakah Governorate, northeastern Syria. Administrative centre is the city of al-Shaddadah.

At the 2004 census, the subdistrict had a population of 58,916.

== Cities, towns and villages ==
Cities, towns and villages of al-Shaddadah Subdistrict
PCode	Name	Population
C4446	al-Shaddadah	15,806
C4441	al-Sabaa wa Arbain	14,177
—N/a	Ghurery	4,081
C4439	Hweizeh	3,515
C4443	Western Jermez	3,351
C4445	Eastern Henna	3,304
C4444	Tarnabet Elrafee	2,734
—N/a	Abajdla	1,852
—N/a	Western Rashidiya	1,806
C4442	Adla	1,623
—N/a	al-Alwa	1,431
C4438	Eastern Rashidiya	1,381
—N/a	Tell Gaar	1,376
—N/a	al-Hummar	1,029
C4447	Kishkish Jabbur	947
C4440	Eastern Elweh	503
