= Abu Hajirat Khuatana =

Abu Hajirat Khuatana أبو حجيرة خواتنة
- Village
- Location of Abu Hajirat Khuatana in Syria
- Coordinates: 36°40′0″N 40°20′33″E
- Country: Syria
- Governorate: al-Hasakah
- District: al-Hasakah
- Subdistrict: al-Hawl

Population (2004)
  - Total: 1,774
- Time zone: UTC+3 (AST)
- Geocode: C4514

Abu Hajirat Khuatana (Arabic: أبو حجيرة خواتنة) or Abu Hujayrat Khawatinah is a village near al-Hawl in eastern al-Hasakah Governorate, northeastern Syria.

The village is located by a main road that connects the provincial capital al-Hasakah, which is located some 30 kilometres (19 mi) to the west, with two important border crossings to Iraq. The Makhfar Umm Jaris border crossing near the Sinjar mountains is just some 25 kilometres (16 mi) to the south-east of the town.

Administratively the village belongs to the al-Hawl Nahiya of al-Hasakah District. At the 2004 census, it had a population of 1,774.

== History ==
During the Syrian civil war, the area was occupied by the Islamic State. The village was however liberated on 15 November 2015 by the Syrian Democratic Forces in the course of their al-Hawl offensive.
