= Al-Arishah Subdistrict =

Al-Arishah Subdistrict ناحية العريشة
- Subdistrict
- Location of Al-Arishah Subdistrict within al-Hasakah Governorate

- Location in Syria
- Coordinates (al-Arishah): 36.2242°N 40.4897°E
- Country: Syria
- Governorate: al-Hasakah
- District: Hasakah District
- Seat: al-Arishah

Area
  - Total: 1,519.41 km^{2} (586.65 sq mi)

Population (2004)
  - Total: 30,544
  - Density: 20.103/km^{2} (52.065/sq mi)
- Geocode: SY080005

Al-Arishah Subdistrict (Arabic: ناحية العريشة) is a subdistrict of al-Shaddadah District in southern al-Hasakah Governorate, northeastern Syria. The Administrative centre is the town of al-Arishah. At the 2004 census, the subdistrict had a population of 30,544.

== Cities, towns and villages ==
Cities, towns and villages of al-Arishah Subdistrict
PCode	Name	Population
—N/a	Bureij Sharqi	4,160
C4497	al-Arishah	3,957
C4500	al-Hajiyah	3,643
C4498	al-Haddadiyah	3,345
C4502	Umm Madfaa	2,519
C4505	Manajid	1,953
C4496	al-Gharb	1,814
—N/a	Umm Raqibah Sharqiyah	1,753
—N/a	Ajajah Sharqiyah	1,441
C4501	al-Hamdaniyah	1,377
—N/a	Qana	838
C4499	Zayn al-Mabraj	726
—N/a	?	684
—N/a	an-Nassiri	600
C4504	Metiaha	565
—N/a	?	424
—N/a	al-Malihah	414
C4495	Ghuzaylan	161
C4503	Umm Kheif	103
—N/a	?	67
