= Al-Alwa =

al-Alwa الْعَلْوَة
- Town
- Location of al-Alwa in Syria
- Coordinates: 35°49′45″N 40°50′14″E
- Country: Syria
- Governorate: al-Hasakah
- District: al-Shaddadah
- Subdistrict: al-Shaddadah

Population (2004)
  - Total: 1,431
- Time zone: UTC+3 (AST)
- Geocode: n/a

al-Alwa (Arabic: الْعَلْوَة, romanized: al-ʿAlwa) is a village in southern Al-Hasakah Governorate, northeastern Syria.

The village is located on the Khabur River Administratively the village belongs to the Nahiya al-Shaddadah of al-Shaddadah District.

The village is predominantly inhabited by Sunni Arabs. At the 2004 census, it had a population of 1,431.
