= Markada Subdistrict =

Markada Subdistrict ناحية مركدة
- Subdistrict
- Location of Markada Subdistrict within al-Hasakah Governorate

- Location in Syria
- Country: Syria
- Governorate: al-Hasakah
- District: Hasakah District
- Seat: Markada

Area
  - Total: 3,383.44 km^{2} (1,306.35 sq mi)

Population (2004)
  - Total: 34,745
  - Density: 10.269/km^{2} (26.597/sq mi)
- Geocode: SY080003

Markada Subdistrict (Arabic: ناحية مركدة) is a subdistrict of al-Shaddadah District in southern al-Hasakah Governorate, northeastern Syria. The Administrative centre is the city of Markada.

At the 2004 census, the subdistrict had a population of 34,745.

== Cities, towns and villages ==
Cities, towns and villages of Markada Subdistrict
PCode	Name	Population
C4450	Tell Safouk	5,781
C4449	al-Fadghami	5,062
—N/a	?	4,188
—N/a	Eastern Markada	3,766
—N/a	Western Dashaa	3,058
—N/a	Sheikh Hamad	3,056
—N/a	?	2,880
C4454	Markada	2,530
C4453	Kishkish Zyanat	1,696
C4448	Elwet Eldisheisha	1,212
C4451	Shamasani	738
—N/a	?	492
C4452	Thalja	286
