= Al-Hawl =

al-Hawl ٱلْهَوْل
- Town
- Location of al-Hawl in Syria
- Coordinates: 36.3914°N 41.1514°E
- Country: Syria
- Governorate: al-Hasakah
- District: al-Hasakah
- Subdistrict: al-Hawl
- Elevation: 452 m (1,483 ft)

Population (2004)
  - Total: 3,409
- Time zone: UTC+3 (AST)
- Geocode: C4519

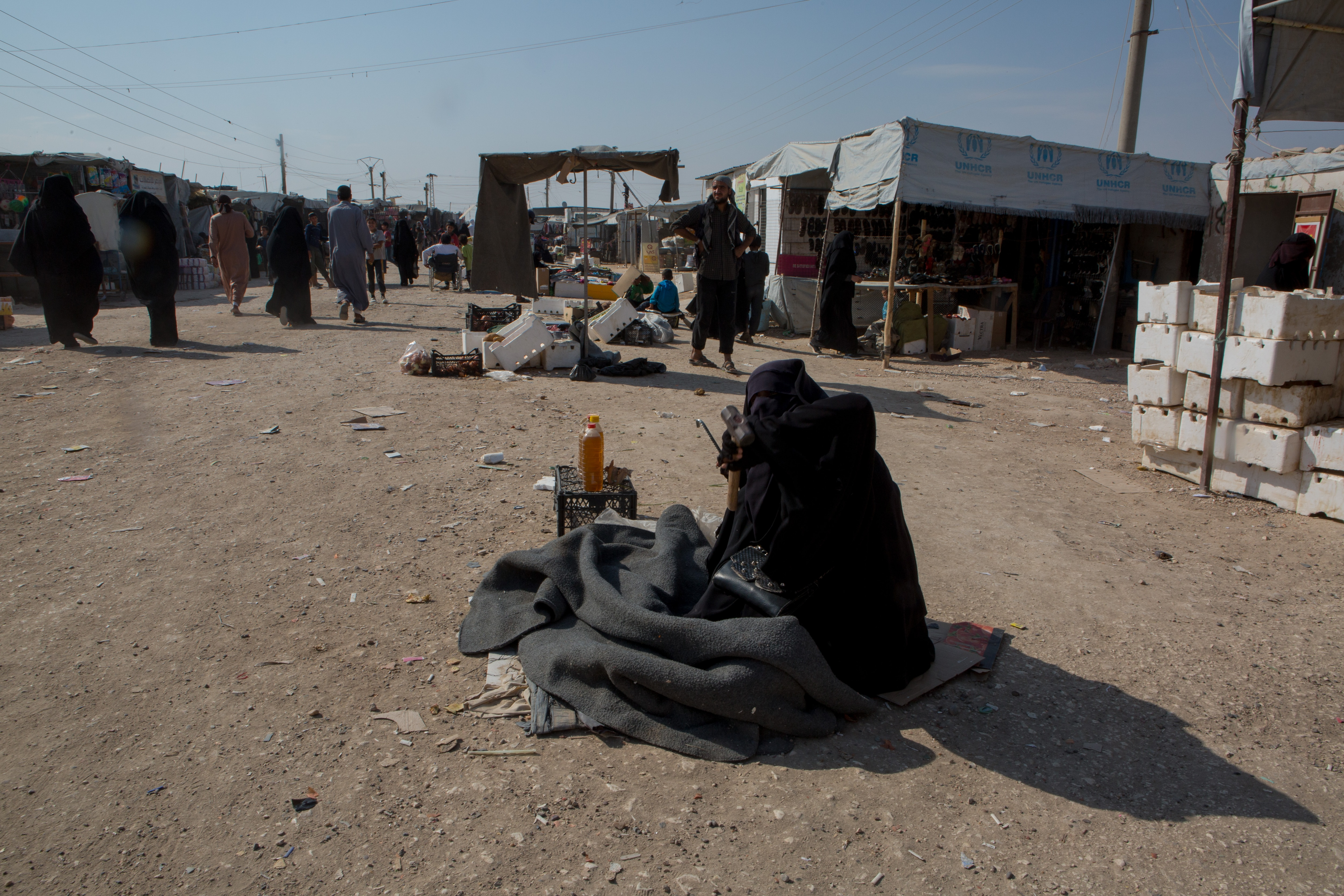

Al-Hawl (Arabic: ٱلْهَوْل, romanized: al-Hawl, lit. '"swampland"'), also spelled al-Hole, al-Hol, al-Hool and al-Houl, is a town in eastern al-Hasakah Governorate, northeastern Syria, under control of the International Coalition. It is the administrative center of the Al-Hawl Subdistrict consisting of 22 municipalities. At the 2004 census, the town had a population of 3,409. Al-Hawl is the site of the Al-Hawl refugee camp.

During the civil war, al-Hawl was seized by Islamic State forces, becoming one of the major IS strongholds in northeastern Syria. On 13 November 2015, al-Hawl was captured by the SDF, in what was considered as the first strategic success by the newly established SDF.

== Infrastructure ==
North of the town is a significant road junction connecting the provincial capital with the Iraqi border. While the northeastern branch proceeds towards Tall Hamis and the Rabia border crossing, the southeastern branch towards the Sinjar mountains passes through the town southeastwards, reaching the Makhfar Umm Jaris border crossing after some 20 kilometres (12 mi).

The town is surrounded by disused military bases formerly used by the Syrian Army and abandoned in February 2013.

== Al-Hawl Refugee Camp ==
In early 1991, during the Gulf War, the United Nations High Commissioner for Refugees established a refugee camp in the southern outskirts of al-Hawl, which was operated in cooperation with the Syrian government. Along with another camp in al-Hasakah, it provided shelter to at least 15,000 refugees from Iraq. Following the 2003 invasion of Iraq and the subsequent Iraq War, the camp was later reopened as one of three camps at the Iraqi–Syrian border, when an exodus of Palestinian refugees living in Iraq occurred due to persecution by the newly-installed Iraqi government.

In the context of the civil war and the takeover of al-Hawl by the Syrian Democratic Forces from the Islamic State, the al-Hawl camp has come to be inhabited by more than 60,000 refugees as of February 2021. More than 40,000 of these people arrived after December 2018 in a series of massive civilian evacuations from ISIS final major holdout, the town of Baghuz Fawqani, fleeing the fierce two-month battle for the town between the SDF and IS. Conditions along the road to the camp, including in screening centers for IS operatives, have been described as "extremely harsh" with limited food, water, shelter and no health services. Aid organizations feared dysentery and other diseases could break out from the overflow camp. The UN stated that 84 people, mostly children, died on the way to al-Hawl from December 2018 to March 2019, mostly due to hypothermia. Around 500 families in the camp are family members of IS fighters, including a large number of foreign nationals. They are however kept in a separate guarded section of the camp after repeated violent incidents between them and other members of the camp. It is estimated that around 1,000 European citizens are living in Al-Hawl refugee camp, of whom more than 600 are children.

During January and February 2021, 21 people were killed by cells of the Islamic State which was more than triple the number of people killed in recent months in what the Syrian Observatory for Human Rights described as the "Al-Hawl mini-state."

== Civil war and conflict ==
In the course of the Eastern al-Hasakah offensive of Syrian Kurdish YPG, Islamic State militants were expelled from large swaths of eastern Hasakah, including Tell Hamis and Tell Brak. The southeastern Hasakah countryside around al-Hawl however remained one of the last IS strongholds in the province.

When in October 2015, the Kurdish YPG militia and their partners, including the Sunni Arab Shammar tribe's al-Sanadid Forces, joined forces to form the SDF, al-Sanadid leader Bandar al-Humaydi made it an "immediate priority to liberate al-Hawl and Ash Shaddadi from the Islamic State.”

In late October 2015, following the successful Battle of Hasakah, the SDF launched their al-Hawl offensive slowly advancing southwards from Tell Hamis. On 11 November they seized Khatuniyah and moved on around the lake further southwards to surround al-Hawl from both northeast and south on 12 November. On 13 November, al-Hawl was captured, in what was considered the SDF's first strategic success. In the following days, the SDF advanced further westwards to close the remaining ISIL-held pocket around the villages of Abu Hajirat Khuatana and Khuwaytilah.

In January 2026, Al-Hawl came under the control of forces affiliated with the Syrian transitional government.

== Geography ==
The town is located some 40 kilometres (25 mi) east of al-Hasakah, on the southern bank of the dried-out wadi ‘Aţā Allāh. While the wadi has dried out, the spring ‘Ayn al-Hawl, located south of the town, still carries water. Nearby villages include Sheikh Ma'ad with the Sheikh Ma‘ad shrine to the north, just across the wadi.

=== Climate ===
Climate data for al-Hawl
Month	Jan	Feb	Mar	Apr	May	Jun	Jul	Aug	Sep	Oct	Nov	Dec	Year
Mean daily maximum °C (°F)	10.9 (51.6)	13.5 (56.3)	17.3 (63.1)	22.6 (72.7)	29.8 (85.6)	36.1 (97.0)	39.7 (103.5)	39.5 (103.1)	34.7 (94.5)	28 (82)	20.4 (68.7)	13.1 (55.6)	25.5 (77.8)
Daily mean °C (°F)	6.6 (43.9)	8.3 (46.9)	11.6 (52.9)	16.3 (61.3)	22.6 (72.7)	28.4 (83.1)	31.7 (89.1)	31.4 (88.5)	26.8 (80.2)	20.8 (69.4)	14.1 (57.4)	8.3 (46.9)	18.9 (66.0)
Mean daily minimum °C (°F)	2.3 (36.1)	3.1 (37.6)	5.9 (42.6)	10.1 (50.2)	15.5 (59.9)	20.8 (69.4)	23.8 (74.8)	23.4 (74.1)	18.9 (66.0)	13.6 (56.5)	7.9 (46.2)	3.6 (38.5)	12.4 (54.3)
Average precipitation mm (inches)	70 (2.8)	52 (2.0)	49 (1.9)	56 (2.2)	26 (1.0)	1 (0.0)	0 (0)	0 (0)	1 (0.0)	15 (0.6)	25 (1.0)	56 (2.2)	351 (13.7)
