= Al-Hawl Subdistrict =

Al-Hawl Subdistrict ناحية الهول
- Subdistrict
- Location of Al-Hawl Subdistrict within al-Hasakah Governorate

- Location in Syria
- Coordinates (al-Hawl): 36.3872°N 41.1328°E
- Country: Syria
- Governorate: Hasakah
- District: Hasakah District
- Seat: al-Hawl

Area
  - Total: 1,271.92 km^{2} (491.09 sq mi)

Population (2004)
  - Total: 14,804
  - Density: 11.639/km^{2} (30.145/sq mi)
- Geocode: SY080006

Al-Hawl Subdistrict (Arabic: ناحية الهول) is a subdistrict of Hasakah District in eastern Hasakah Governorate, northeastern Syria. Administrative centre is the town of al-Hawl.

The subdistrict is located east of al-Hasakah. It borders to the Khabur Basin to the west, and the Sinjar mountains just across the Iraqi border to the east.

At the 2004 census, it had a population of 14,804.

== Cities, towns and villages ==
Cities, towns and villages of Al-Hawl Subdistrict
| PCode | Name | Population |
|---|---|---|
| C4519 | al-Hawl | 3,409 |
| C4514 | Abu Hjera Khawatneh | 1,774 |
| C4513 | al-Khatuniyah | 1,218 |
| —N/a | Tal al-Hawa | 1,102 |
| —N/a | Dhi Qar | 851 |
| C4520 | Botheh Sharqia | 664 |
| C4517 | Nafayel | 631 |
| C4506 | al-Khan | 621 |
| C4522 | Khuwaytilah | 529 |
| C4516 | Shulalah | 518 |
| —N/a | Sawi | 440 |
| C4518 | Atshana | 429 |
| C4507 | Janabeh Sharqi | 387 |
| C4523 | Qattara | 383 |
| C4508 | Janabeh Wasatah | 374 |
| C4510 | Um Fakik | 326 |
| C4511 | Motasarrefiyeh | 259 |
| C4521 | Nazileh | 257 |
| C4509 | Bir Jafar | 255 |
| C4512 | Abu Wishwash | 147 |
| —N/a | Khuwaytilyah al-Khan | 133 |
| C4515 | Khuwaytilah Hmud | 97 |
