= Nimrud Slab =

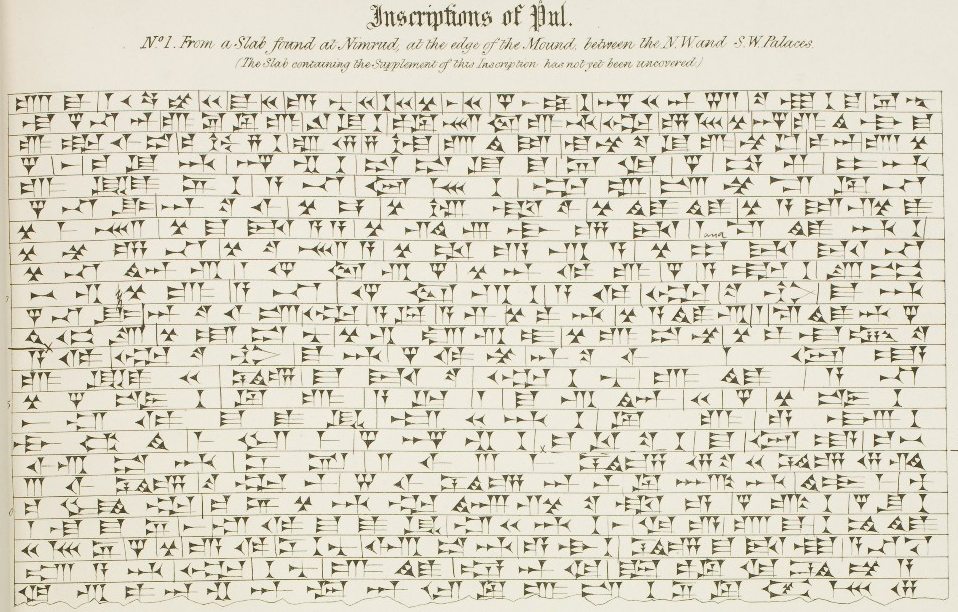
- The Nimrud Slab in Rawlinson's Editio princeps. The original slab has been lost.
- Material: Gypsum
- Writing: Akkadian cuneiform
- Created: c. 800 BC
- Discovered: 1854; Nineveh, Iraq
- Discovered by: William Loftus
- Present location: Unknown

The Nimrud Slab, also known as the Calah Orthostat Slab, is the top half of a "summary inscription" of the reign of Adad-nirari III (811 to 783 BC) discovered in 1854 by William Loftus in his excavations at Nimrud on behalf of the Assyrian Excavation Fund.

It is the best known of the inscriptions of Adad-nirari III, since it includes a description of early Assyrian conquests in Syria and Palestine.

The inscription was carved on a gypsum slab, and the surviving part of the inscription is thought to represent the top half of the original slab. The original slab was temporarily lost after it was thought to have been left behind in Nimrud. However, a squeeze was taken by Edwin Norris, which allowed the text to be published by Rawlinson.

Excavations by Iraqi archaeologist Muzahim Hussein in 1993 relocated the slab in the so-called "Upper Chambers" area of the Nimurd citadel, first excavated by Austen Henry Layard, and Dr. Ali Yassin Ahmad published the inscription in the Iraqi journal Sumer (LI nos. 1–2, pp. 27–31). Excavations by a University of Pennsylvania Museum team led by American archaeologist Dr. Michael Danti in the "Upper Chambers," more properly the Palace of King Adad Nerari III, re-examined this area in 2022. This slab was a door sill (threshold) within the palace, and the Penn team has found several other inscribed thresholds of this same king in the doorways of the building.

The text as translated by Luckenbill as below:

[I subdued] from the bank of the Euphrates, the land of Hatti, the land of Amurru in its entirety, the land of Tyre, the land of Sidon, the land of Humri, the land of Edom, the land of Palastu, as far as the great sea of the setting sun. I imposed tax and tribute on them.

== See also ==
- Saba'a Stele
- Tell al-Rimah stela
