= Battle of Markada =

Military confrontation between two jihadist groups

Coordinates: 35.7333°N 40.7667°E

- Part of Opposition–Islamic State conflict during the Syrian civil war
Date	21–31 March 2014 (1 week and 3 days)
Location	Markada, Syria
Result	ISIL victory: ISIL captures Markada on 29 March

Belligerents
Al-Nusra Front	Islamic State of Iraq and the Levant: al-Barakah Province; Katiba al-Bittar al-Libi

Commanders and leaders
Abu Mohammad al-Julani (Leader of Al-Nusra Front)	Abu Bakr al-Baghdadi (Leader of ISIL); Omar al-Farouk al-Turki † (Top provincial ISIL commander)

Casualties and losses
- 120 killed

The Battle of Markada (also spelled "Markadah" or "Markadahin") was a military confrontation between two jihadist groups, al-Qaeda's al-Nusra Front and the Islamic State (ISIS), over the town of Markada in the Al-Hasakah Governorate, in March 2014 during the Syrian civil war. The strategic importance of the town to the ISIS lay in its position on the group's weapons supply route from Iraq, the road linking Al-Hasakah with Deir ez-Zor and a hill that dominates the surrounding area. On the ISIS side there were many Sunni Iranians, including Kurds, who played an important role in the battle.

== Battle ==
The battle started on 21 March 2014, with fighting near Markada's grain silos that left 27 al-Nusra Front fighters dead and others missing.

On the morning of 27 March, ISIS attacked the town, which was being held by the al-Nusra Front. ISIS began the assault with a heavy artillery bombardment and managed to force al-Nusra to withdraw to the town's hospital and the mountain overlooking Markada.

Before dawn on 29 March, clashes erupted in the town as ISIS attacked the hospital and al-Nusra positions in the mountain. After heavy fighting that left 43 al-Nusra and 13 ISIS fighters dead, ISIS took full control of the town as al-Nusra forces retreated towards the town of al-Sour in the eastern rural area of Deir ez-Zor province. Many al-Nusra fighters were also captured. Among those killed was also the top provincial ISIS commander, Omar al-Farouk al-Turki.

On 31 March, al-Nusra launched a counterattack in an attempt to recapture the town which failed. By this time, the number of those killed since the start of the fighting had risen to 120.

== Bibliography ==
- Nance, Malcolm W. (2016). Defeating ISIS: Who They Are, How They Fight, What They Believe. New York City: Skyhorse Publishing. ISBN 978-1510711846.
