= Tell al-Rimah stela =

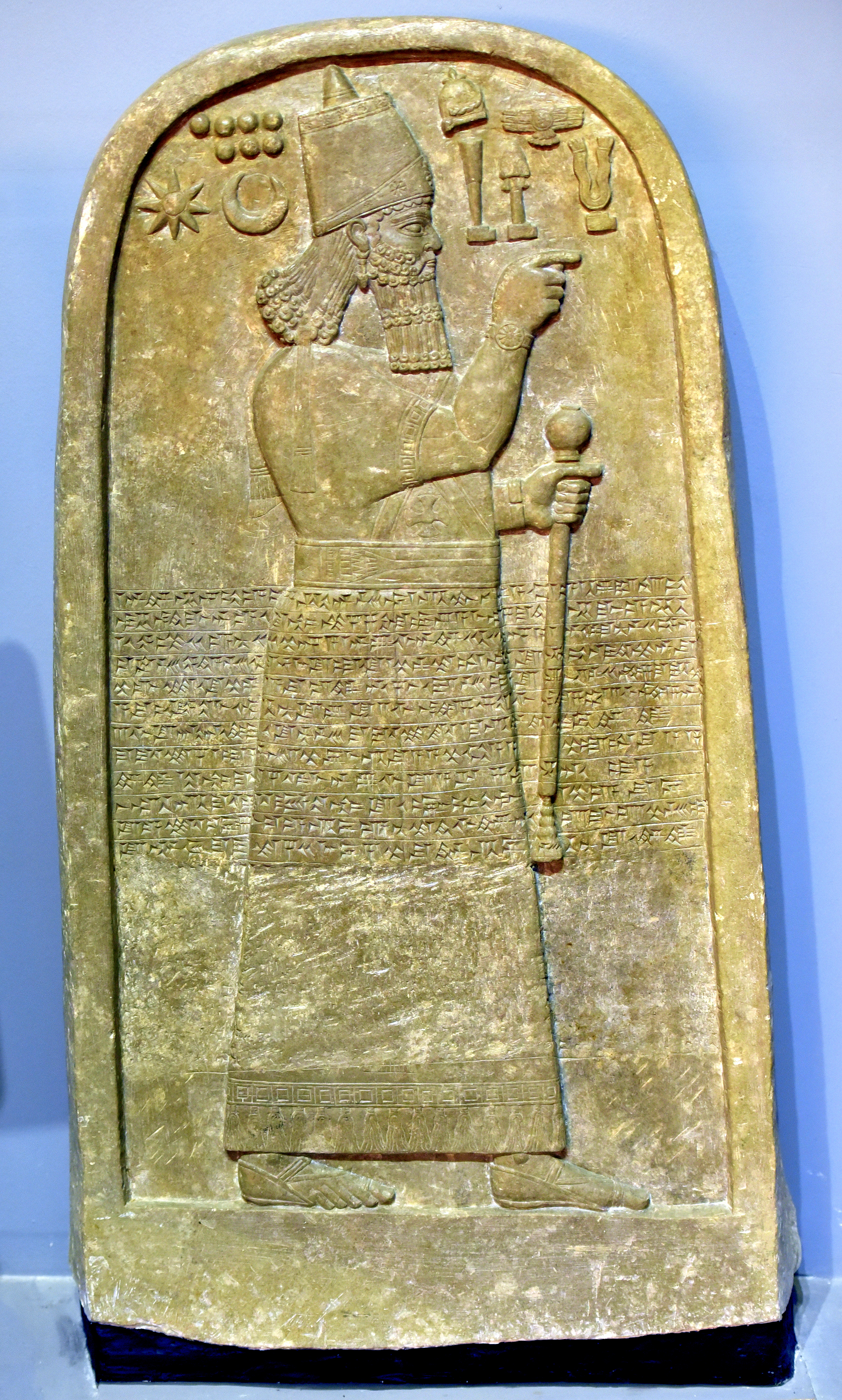
- Stele of Adad-nirari III at the Iraq Museum
- Created: c. 780 BC
- Discovered: 1967; Nineveh Governorate, Iraq
- Present location: Baghdad, Baghdad Governorate, Iraq

The Tell al-Rimah stela or the Stele of Adad-nirari III is a victory stele of Adad-nirari III which include a reference to an early king of Samaria as "Jehoash the Samarian" the first cuneiform mention of Samaria by that name.

It was discovered in 1967 during excavations at Tell al-Rimah and is today at the Iraq Museum.

== See also ==
- Saba'a Stele
- Calah Slab
