= Humaydi Daham al-Hadi =

Syrian politician (1936–2022)

Sheikh Humaydi Daham al-Hadi
- حميدي دهام الهادي الجربا
- Born: c. 1936; Tall Ulu al-Ula, Al-Hasakah Governorate, First Syrian Republic
- Died: November 10, 2022 (aged 86); Erbil, Kurdistan Region, Iraq
- Other names: Hamidi Daham al-Hadi, Hmeidi Daham al-Jarba
- Children: Bandar al-Humaydi
- Military career
- Allegiance: Autonomous Administration of North and East Syria
- Military affiliation: Al-Sanadid Forces
- Service years: 2014–2022
- Rank: Tribal leader and politician
- Known for: Leadership of Shammar tribe; Co-president of Jazira canton (Rojava)
- Conflicts: Campaigns against ISIL
- Other work: Secretary General of the Democratic Conservative Party (Syria)

Sheikh Humaydi Daham al-Hadi (also Hamidi Daham al-Hadi and Hmeidi Daham al-Jarba; Arabic: حميدي دهام الهادي الجربا, 1936 – 10 November 2022) was the leader of the Arab tribe of Shammar in Syria.

== Biography ==
Al-Hadi al-Jarba was born in Tall Ulu al-Ula, al-Hasakah Governorate in 1936, to Daham ibn al-Hadi ibn al-Assi al-Jarba, who was the leader of Shammar tribe and a member in the People's Assembly of Syria.

In 2014, he was given a role described variously as co-president and co-governor of Jazira canton of Rojava in northern Syria. He has actively promoted the campaign against ISIL, and has been a severe critic of Wahhabism.

His son Bandar al-Humaydi is military leader of al-Sanadid Forces.

He chaired a meeting of Arab tribal representatives in August 2017 that resulted in the foundation of the Democratic Conservative Party. He was subsequently chosen as the party's first secretary general. In March 2019, he traveled from northern Syria to Damascus, the Khmeimim Air Base and Baghdad for talks with Syrian, Russian and Iraqi officials. The visit was interpreted as a sign of his willingness to abandon the PYD in favour of the Syrian government.

On 10 November 2022, he died at hospital in Erbil, aged 86.
