= Khatuniyah, al-Hasakah =

Khatuniyah خاتونية بحرة
- Village
- Location of Khatuniyah in Syria
- Coordinates: 36°25′22″N 41°13′12″E
- Country: Syria
- Governorate: al-Hasakah
- District: al-Hasakah
- Subdistrict: al-Hawl

Population (2004)
  - Total: 1,218
- Time zone: UTC+3 (AST)
- Geocode: C4513

Khatuniyah (Arabic: خاتونية بحرة, romanized: Khātūnīyah) is a village near al-Hawl in eastern al-Hasakah Governorate, northeastern Syria.

The village is located on a small peninsula at the northeastern shore of al-Khatuniyah Lake (Arabic: بحرة الخاتونية, romanized: Baḩrat al Khātūnīyah, close to the border with Iraq. Northwest of the town, a main road that connects the provincial capital al-Hasakah, which is located around 40 kilometres (25 mi) to the west, with the Rabia border crossing towards Iraq.

Administratively the village belongs to the al-Hawl Nahiya of al-Hasakah District. At the 2004 census, it had a population of 1,218.

== History ==
During the Syrian Civil War, the area was occupied by the Islamic State. The village was however captured on 11 November 2015 by the Syrian Democratic Forces in the course of their al-Hawl offensive.
