= Al-Fadghami =

Village in Al-Hasakah, Syria

al-Fadghami الفدغمي
- Town
- Location of al-Fadghami in Syria
- Coordinates: 35°54′18″N 40°53′16″E
- Country: Syria
- Governorate: al-Hasakah
- District: al-Shaddadah
- Subdistrict: Markada

Population (2004)
  - Total: 5,062
- Time zone: UTC+3 (AST)
- Geocode: C4449

Al-Fadghami (Arabic: الفدغمي) is a village in southern al-Hasakah Governorate, northeastern Syria.

Administratively the village belongs to the Markada Subdistrict of al-Shaddadah District. At the 2004 census, it had a population of 5,062.

== Qattunan ==
The tell of the village might be the site of the ancient Qattunan; a provincial center of the kingdom of Mari. Qattunan might be the same "Gu-da-da-num" mentioned in the Ebla tablets. It was known as "Qatni", "Qatnu" and "Qa-tu-un" to the Assyrians.
