= Al-Sabaa wa Arbain =

al-Sabaa wa Arbain السبعة وأربعين
- Town
- Location of al-Sabaa wa Arbain in Syria
- Coordinates: 36°04′52″N 40°39′23″E
- Country: Syria
- Governorate: al-Hasakah
- District: al-Shaddadah
- Subdistrict: al-Shaddadah

Population (2004)
  - Total: 14,177
- Time zone: UTC+3 (AST)
- Geocode: C4441

Al-Sabaa wa Arbain (Arabic: السبعة وأربعين, romanized: as-Sabʿa wa-ʾArbaʿīn) is a town in southern al-Hasakah Governorate, northeastern Syria.

Administratively, the town belongs to the Nahiya al-Shaddadah subdistrict of the al-Shaddadah District. At the time of the 2004 census, it had a population of 14,177. Nearby localities include al-Shaddadeh to the east.

== Civil war ==
On 10 January 2023, joint forces of the US-led coalition and forces of the SDF launched a counter-terror operation in the village, where 2 ISIS fighters had barricaded themselves inside a house. One ISIS militant killed himself by detonating a suicide vest and the other was shot dead by the joint forces.
