= Al-Shaddadah =

al-Shaddadah ٱلشَّدَّادَة Şeddadê
- Town
- Location of al-Shaddadah in Syria
- Coordinates: 36.0561°N 40.7303°E
- Country: Syria
- Governorate: al-Hasakah
- District: al-Shaddadah
- Subdistrict: al-Shaddadah

Population (2004)
  - Total: 15,806
- Time zone: UTC+3 (AST)
- Geocode: C4446

Al-Shaddadah or al-Shaddadi (Arabic: ٱلشَّدَّادَة \ ٱلشَّدَّادِي, romanized: aš-Šaddādah / aš-Šaddādī; Kurdish: Şeddadê) is a town in southern al-Hasakah Governorate, northeastern Syria. The town is the administrative center of the al-Shaddadah Subdistrict, which consists of 16 municipalities. At the 2004 census, al-Shaddadah had a population of 15,806.

== Name and geography ==
The town's name might be derived from "Shadadu"; a governor of the district of "Suru" mentioned in the annals of the Assyrian king Assurnasirpal II. The town is situated off the western bank of the Khabur River. Nearby localities include al-Sabaa wa Arbain to the west.

== Syrian civil war ==
=== Early developments ===
In the course of the Syrian civil war, the town was attacked by jihadist rebel forces of the al-Nusra Front in the Battle of Shaddadi (2013) and was captured three days later. According to the Syrian Observatory for Human Rights (SOHR), over 100 pro-Assad fighters and 40 al-Nusra fighters were killed, as well as dozens of petroleum workers, as a result of the battle.

=== Capture and control by the Islamic State ===
The town was later attacked and captured by the Islamic State (ISIS) in July 2013. Al-Shaddadah remained one of the last ISIS strongholds in the province over the next years.

The town gained notoriety for its use as a slave market where Yazidi girls captured in the Sinjar region in August 2014 were sold as sex slaves. The New York Times also reported an incident in al-Shaddadah in which a Saudi ISIS fighter raped a 12-year-old Yazidi girl.

=== Capture and control by Kurdish-led forces ===
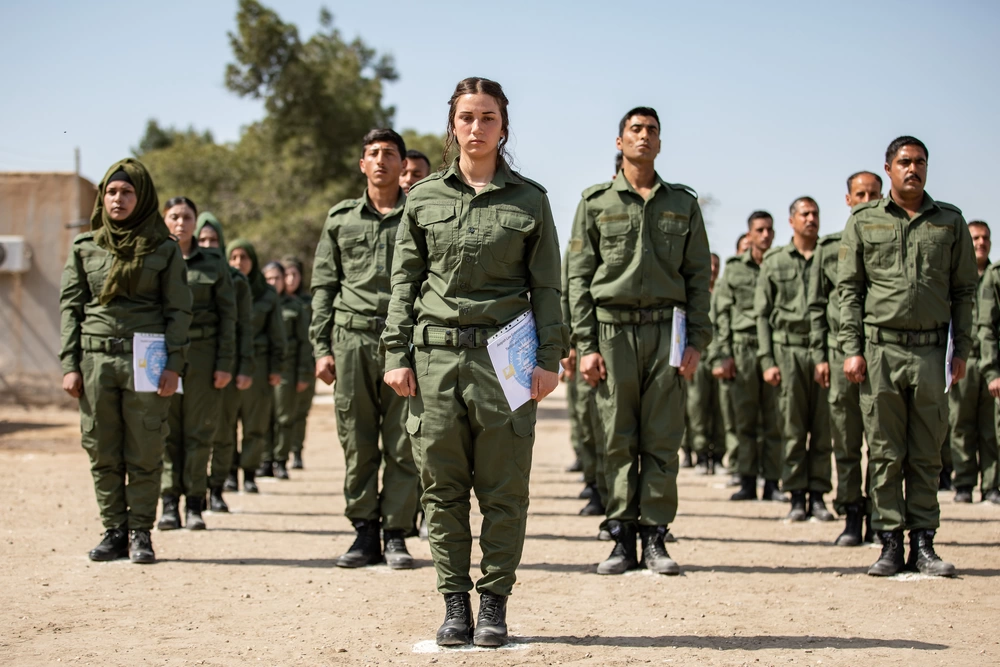
Asayish members graduating at a training base near al-Shaddadah, 3 April 2023.

On 11 October 2015, one day after the Kurdish-majority People’s Protection Units (YPG) and allied groups, including the al-Sanadid Forces of the Arab Shammar tribe, formed the U.S.-backed Syrian Democratic Forces (SDF), al-Sanadid leader Bandar al-Humaydi made it an "immediate priority to liberate al-Hawl and al-Shaddadah from the Islamic State” for the newly formed coalition.

On 24 November 2015, it became known that ISIS militants were transferring their family members further south to the Deir ez-Zor Governorate. After the SDF captured the South Hasakah Dam on 30 November, they continued their offensive southward, towards the city of al-Shaddadah, now ISIS' last stronghold in al-Hasakah province. Subsequently, Arab tribal leaders reportedly urged ISIS to withdraw from the city "peacefully," in order to prevent civilian casualties and the possible collapse of al-Shaddadi's economic infrastructure, if a destructive battle between the SDF/coalition forces and the Islamic State were to occur. It was also reported that ISIS was beginning to evacuate some of its positions near al-Shaddadi.

On 19 February 2016, the town was captured by the SDF and subsequently became part of the DAANES. After SDF forces took control of the town, Yazidi spiritual leader Eidou Baba Sheikh stated, “The Yazidis are happy when they [SDF] liberated the town.”

Following its capture, the U.S. Army established a military base southeast of the city. The base regularly receives cargo aircraft carrying logistical and military supplies and serves as a major hub for military coordination and anti-ISIS operations in cooperation with the SDF and local Asayish police force.

The U.S. military base has been targeted with vehicle-borne improvised explosive devices (VBIEDs) and rocket attacks by ISIS and various Iranian-backed militias, including the Islamic Resistance in Iraq, notably during attacks on U.S. bases amid the Gaza conflict.

== Economy ==
The areas surrounding al-Shaddadah contain one of the large oil and gas fields in Hasakah Governorate.
