= Markada =

Markada مَرْكَدَة
- Town
- Location of Markada in Syria
- Coordinates: 35.7589°N 40.7692°E
- Country: Syria
- Governorate: al-Hasakah
- District: al-Shaddadah
- Subdistrict: Markada

Population (2004)
  - Total: 2,530
- Time zone: UTC+3 (AST)
- Geocode: C4454

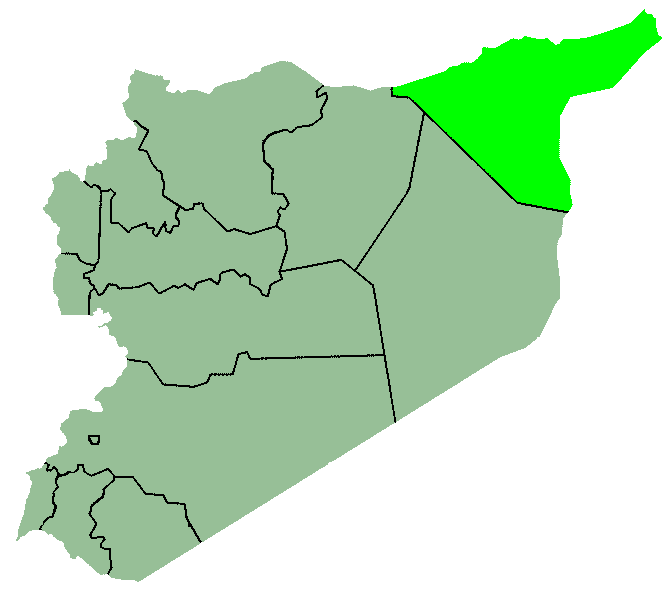

Markada (Arabic: مَرْكَدَة, sometimes Markadah or Margada) is a town in southern al-Hasakah Governorate, northeastern Syria. It is the administrative center of the Nahiya Markada consisting of 13 municipalities. In the 2004 census, Markada had a population of 2,530.

The town is divided by the Khabur River.

== History ==
Markada succeeded the village of "Makîsîn" (also spelled "Makasîn", "Maykasan" or "Makîs"). During early Islamic rule (7th–10th centuries), Makisin was a town in the district of Diyar Rabi'a with a bridge that crossed the Khabur River. Large quantities of cotton were grown around the site. In the late 680s, numerous Arab Taghlib tribesmen were killed in an ambush at Makisin by the Sulaym tribe as part of the long-running Qays–Yaman feud.

Obadiah the Proselyte visited Makisin in the 12th century and found there a Jewish community and synagogue, which then housed the Codex Sassoon.

=== Civil War ===
Markada saw fighting between the Syrian Government forces and the al-Nusra Front during 2013. Having gained control of the town, the al-Nusra Front were driven out the following year by Islamic State in the Battle of Markada. By March 2014 thousands of residents had fled from Markada, many to al-Sur in Deir ez-Zor Governorate.

US-led Coalition airstrikes against ISIL targeted the town in September 2017, with many casualties, including Iraqi refugees, reported. On 19 October, the SDF attacked the town, capturing part of it. The town was fully captured by the SDF on 9 November 2017.

== See also ==
- Battle of Markada, March 2014
