= Al-Arishah =

al-Arishah ٱلْعَرِيشَة
- Town
- Location of al-Arishah in Syria
- Coordinates: 36.2475°N 40.7619°E
- Country: Syria
- Governorate: al-Hasakah
- District: al-Shaddadah
- Subdistrict: al-Arishah

Population (2004)
  - Total: 3,957
- Time zone: UTC+3 (AST)
- Geocode: C4497

al-Arishah (Arabic: ٱلْعَرِيشَة, romanized: al-ʿArīšah) is a town in southern al-Hasakah Governorate, northeastern Syria. It is administrative center of the Nahiya al-Arishah District, which consists of 20 municipalities.

During the 2004 census, al-Arishah had a population of 3,957.
