= Al-Sanadid Forces =

Militia in Syria

- قوات الصناديد
- Flag of Al-Sanadid Forces
- Leaders: Bandar al-Humaydi (Sanadid military leader); Humaydi Daham al-Hadi (Tribe leader)
- Dates active: 2013–present
- Headquarters: Tell Hamis, Syria
- Active regions: Democratic Autonomous Administration of North and East Syria
- Ideology: Pro-Shammar tribal autonomy Anti-Wahhabism; Anti-House of Saud; Pro-breakup of Saudi Arabia
- Size: 4,500
- Part of: Syrian Democratic Forces (until 2026)
- Wars: Syrian Civil War
- Website: web.archive.org/web/20150924073107/http://alsanadid.com/

The Forces of the Brave (Arabic: جيش الصناديد / قوات الصناديد, romanized: Quwwāt aṣ-Ṣanādīd / Jayš aṣ-Ṣanādīd), generally called the al-Sanadid Forces, is a militia formed by the Arab Shammar tribe to fight against the Islamic State. Even though the tribe's Syrian strongholds are mostly in the Jazira Canton of the Democratic Autonomous Administration of North and East Syria (DAANES), such as at al-Yaarubiyah and Tell Hamis, the militia operates throughout most of the DAANES. The red colour in their flag represents blood while the yellow represents the light, calling themselves "marchers on the red death". The al-Sanadid Forces are affiliated with the co-governor/co-president of Jazira Canton and tribal leader Humaydi Daham al-Hadi, and are led by Humaydi's son Bandar al-Humaydi.

== Ideology ==
The al-Sanadid Forces primarily want to ensure the Shammar tribe's autonomy and security in the Al-Hasakah Governorate; furthermore, they have pledged to fight Wahhabism. Humaydi Daham al-Hadi has also expressed his ambition to facilitate the breakup of Saudi Arabia, likely to retake the former Emirate of Jabal Shammar from the House of Saud.

The Shammar tribe generally maintains a long cooperative relationship with the Syrian Kurds since the 18th century, despite a number of tribal disputes. In course of the 2004 Qamishli riots, the Shammar under Humaydi Daham al-Hadi were the only Arab tribe in al-Hasakah Governorate that refused to fight the Kurdish protestors for the government. As result, when the al-Sanadid Forces were formed, they were set up as explicitly pro-Kurdish. Humaydi Daham al-Hadi and his son both repeatedly expressed loyalty to and support for the Kurdish forces.

The al-Sanadid Forces' stance in regard to the Ba'athist government of Bashar al-Assad is ambiguous. Whereas some sources regard Humaydi Daham al-Hadi as "anti-government" figure, others accuse the al-Sanadid Forces of siding with the government, while strictly opposing the Syrian opposition. The militia itself has claimed that it neither supports nor opposes Assad's rule, with Humaydi Daham al-Hadi having said that "whoever rules Damascus rules Syria".

== History ==
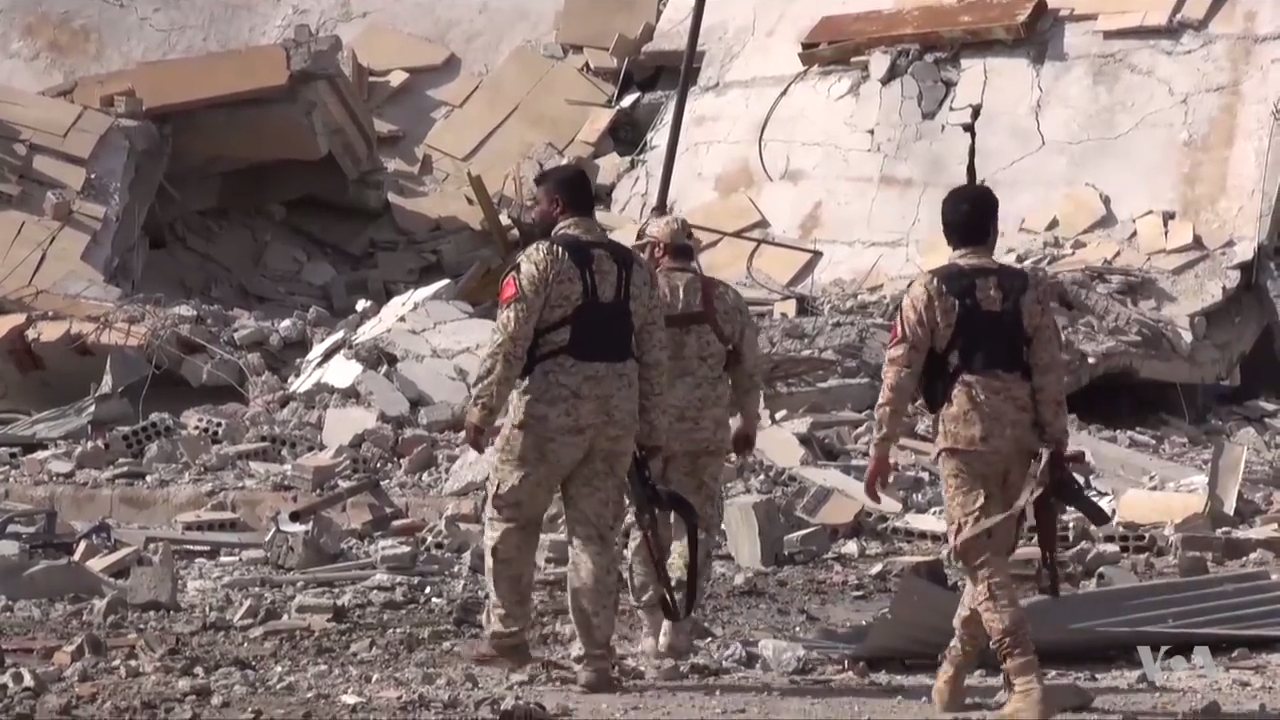
The Sanadid Forces in al-Shaddadi after the offensive in February 2016.

The Shammar is a historically powerful and prestigious tribal group, though their number and influence in Syria has dwindled since the independence of Syria. After the outbreak of the Syrian Civil War and the almost complete retreat of the Syrian Army from the al-Hasakah Governorate in mid 2012, Humaydi Daham al-Hadi soon aligned himself with the Syrian Kurdish Democratic Union Party (PYD) and in 2013 set up the Army of Dignity (Jaysh al-Karama), which later transformed into the al-Sanadid Forces. The alliance with the Kurds and the formation of the Army of Dignity were Humaydi's response to the growing power of Jihadi groups like ISIL in the region. By aiding the PYD's YPG and YPJ in capturing much of the al-Hasakah Governorate, and especially securing the local oil fields, the militia managed to grow in size and power, which allowed Humaydi Daham al-Hadi to maintain his authority over the Syrian Shammar. Shammar members that were opposed to him and the PYD while supporting the Syrian opposition faced "expulsion and imprisonment" by the Army of Dignity / al-Sanadid Forces.

As the influence of the al-Sanadid Forces and the Shammar grew, their cooperation with the PYD increased. Humaydi Daham al-Hadi was elected co-governor (along with Hediye Yusuf) of Jazira Canton in early 2015, while the al-Sanadid Forces joined the Syrian Democratic Forces and helped to expel ISIL from the rest of the al-Hasakah Governorate over the course of 2015/16. The growing power of the Shammar was however resented by other Arab tribes in northeastern Syria such as the Tayy, which led them to oppose any attempts by the al-Sandid Forces to integrate non-Shammar tribal forces into their ranks. Some tribes have instead opted to support the Assad government or even ISIL.

Nevertheless, experts still consider the al-Sanadid Forces as important mediators between Arabs and Kurds, and major diplomatic asset for the PYD and SDF. As result, the Shammar militia took part in several offensives in the non-Kurdish/non-Shammar Raqqa Governorate, such as the Tishrin Dam offensive, the Northern Raqqa offensive, and the campaign and battle to capture Raqqa city, ISIL's de facto capital. The SDF has also advocated that an offensive against the ISIL-held areas in Deir ez-Zor Governorate should be spearheaded by the Deir ez-Zor Military Council and the al-Sanadid Forces instead of other United States-allied Arab militias such as the Lions of the East Army, Revolutionary Commando Army or Deir ez-Zor Liberation Brigade. Regional WINEP expert Fabrice Balanche claimed that this support for the Shammar militia stemmed primarily from the PYD's unwillingness to allow potential political rivals to grow in power in eastern Syria, although both the Lions of East as well as Deir ez-Zor Liberation Brigade have themselves expressed opposition or even open hostility toward the SDF.

Despite their usual cordial relationship, there have also been tensions between the YPG and the al-Sanadid Forces over time, such as when violent local disputes erupted between factions of two groups in June 2017.

On 20 January 2026, during the 2026 northeastern Syria offensive, it is reported that members of the al-Sanadid Forces defected from the SDF to the Syrian Ministry of Defense and allowed Syrian troops to be deployed in Al-Yaarubiyah border crossing with Iraq and Tell Hamis.

== See also ==
- Ahrar al-Jazeera – another Shammar militia.
- List of armed groups in the Syrian Civil War

== Bibliography ==
- Hassan Hassan (2017). "The Battle for Raqqa and the Challenges after Liberation" (PDF). CTC Sentinel. 10 (6). West Point, New York: Combating Terrorism Center: 1–10. Archived from the original (PDF) on 2017-10-09.
