= Al-Shaddadah District =

Al-Shaddadah District منطقة الشدادي Navçeya Şeddadê
- District
- Location of Al-Shaddadah District within al-Hasakah Governorate

- Location in Syria
- Coordinates (Al-Shaddadah): 36.06401629°N 40.76056506°E
- Country: Syria
- Governorate: al-Hasakah
- Seat: Al-Shaddadah
- Subdistricts: 3 nawāḥī

Area
  - Total: 6,837.9 km^{2} (2,640.1 sq mi)

Population (2004)
  - Total: 124,205
  - Density: 18.164/km^{2} (47.045/sq mi)

Al-Shaddadah District (Arabic: منطقة الشدادي, romanized: manṭiqat aš-Šaddādah; Kurdish: Navçeya Şeddadê) is a district of al-Hasakah Governorate in northeastern Syria. The administrative centre is the city of Al-Shaddadah. The district was established in 2009 by presidential decree after being separated from the al-Hasakah District.

The district encompasses the southern part of the Khabur River basin, as well as the Ajaja Dam and Lake Ajaja. Most of its territory forms part of the Jazira steppe. The Al-Jabsa natural gas field is also located within the district. At the 2004 census, the district had a population of 124,205.

== Subdistricts ==
The district of Al-Shaddadah is divided into three subdistricts or nawāḥī (population as of 2004):

Subdistricts of al-Hasakah District
PCode	Name	Area	Population	Villages	Seat
SY080002	al-Shaddadah Subdistrict	1,935.05 km^{2}	58,916	16	al-Shaddadah
SY080003	Markada Subdistrict	3,383.44 km^{2}	34,745	13	Markada
SY080005	al-Arishah Subdistrict	1,519.41 km^{2}	30,544	20	al-Arishah
