= Imam Ali Mosque =

The Imam Ali Mosque may refer to:

- Imam Ali Mosque (Shaki), in Azerbaijan
- Mausoleum of Imam Ali, in Afghanistan
- Imam Ali Mosque (Basra), in Basra, Iraq
- Imam Ali Mosque (Copenhagen), in Copenhagen, Denmark
- Imam Ali Shrine, in Najaf, Iraq
