= Basra =

Port city in southern Iraq

Basra ٱلْبَصْرَة Basrah
- Metropolis
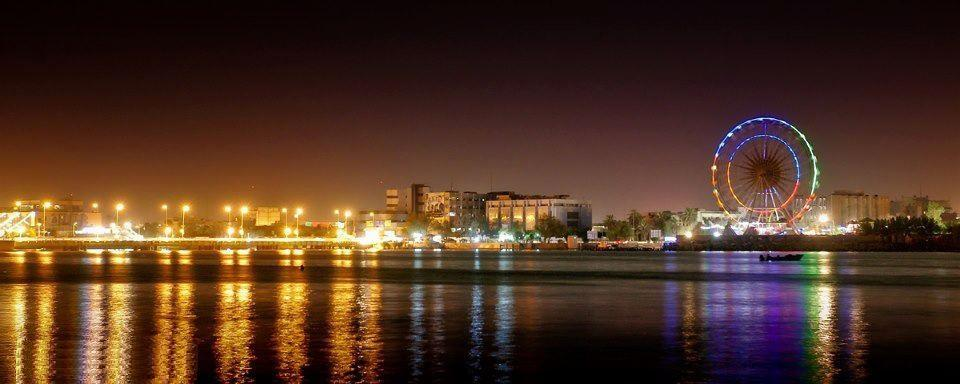
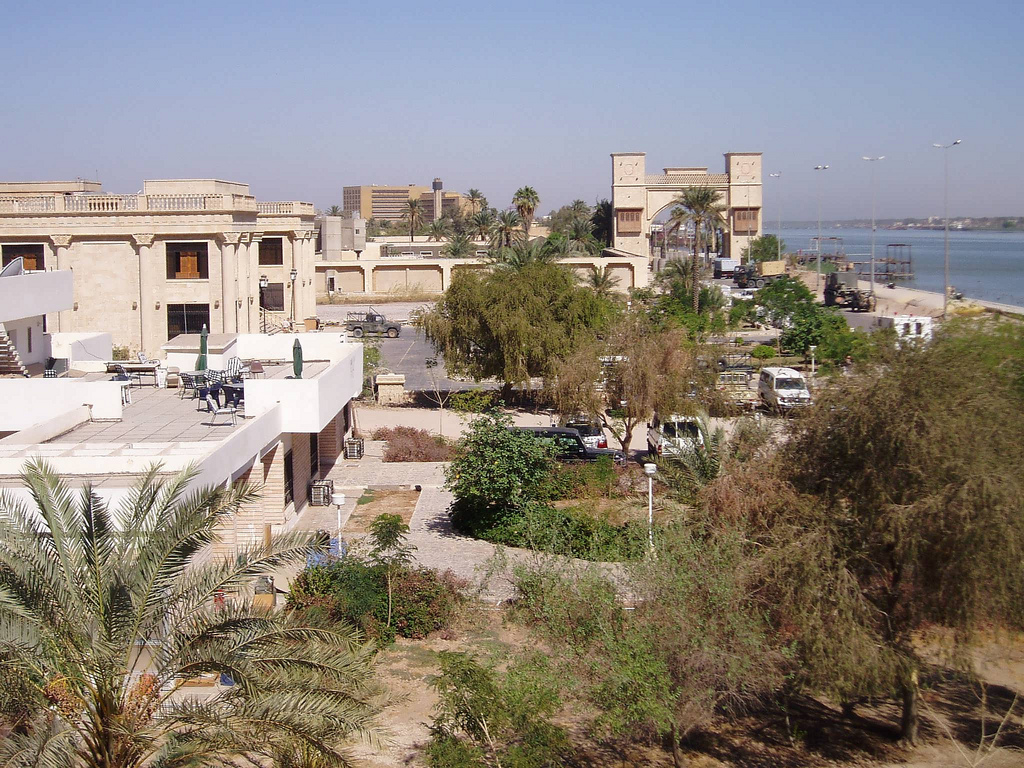
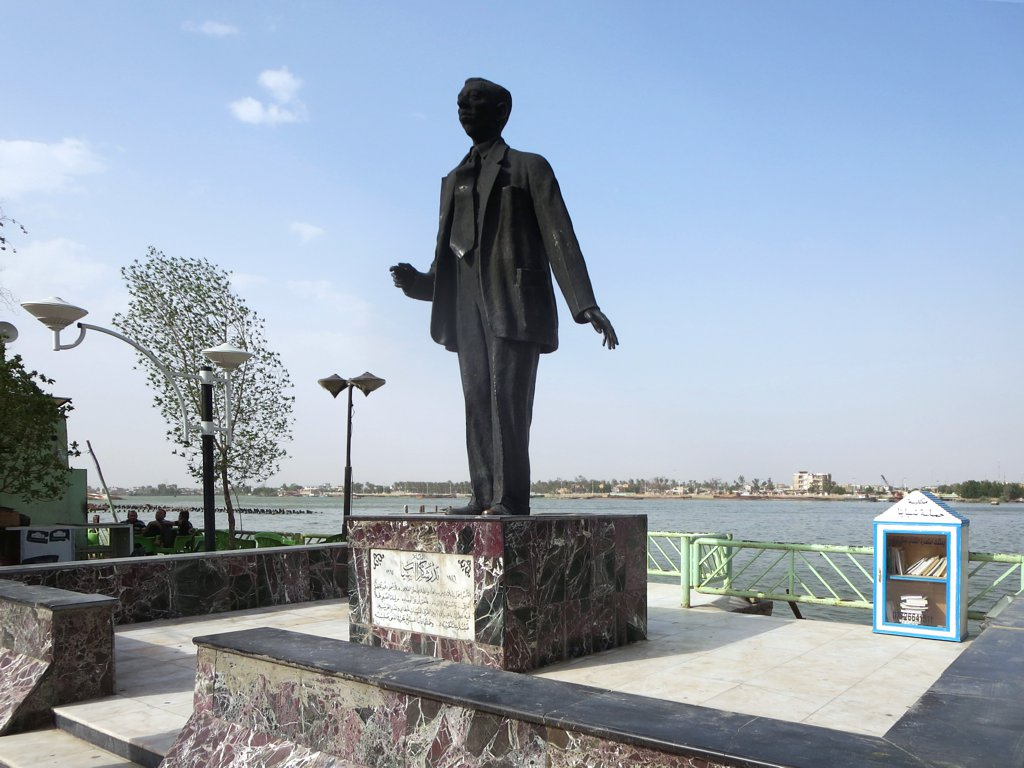
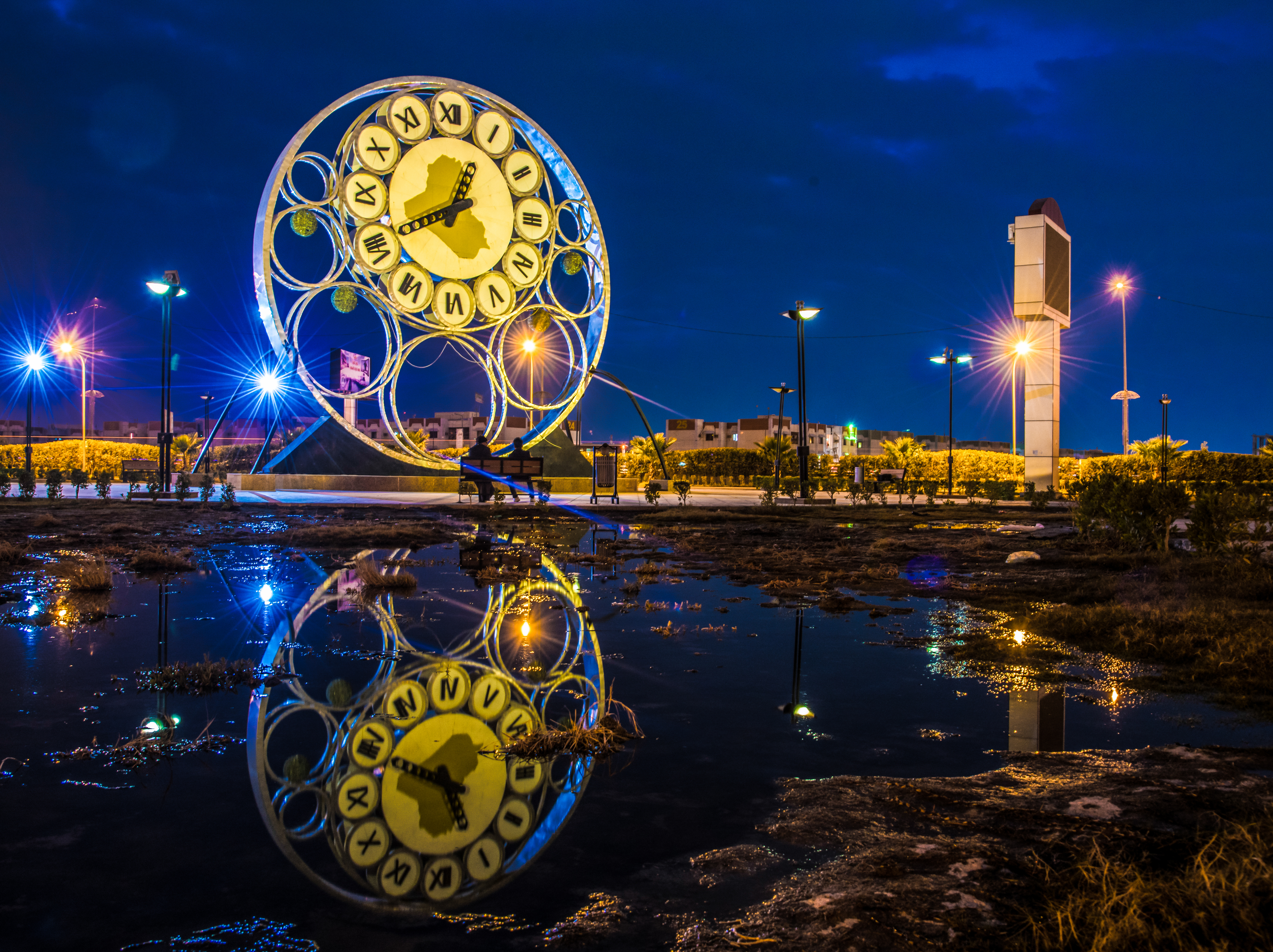
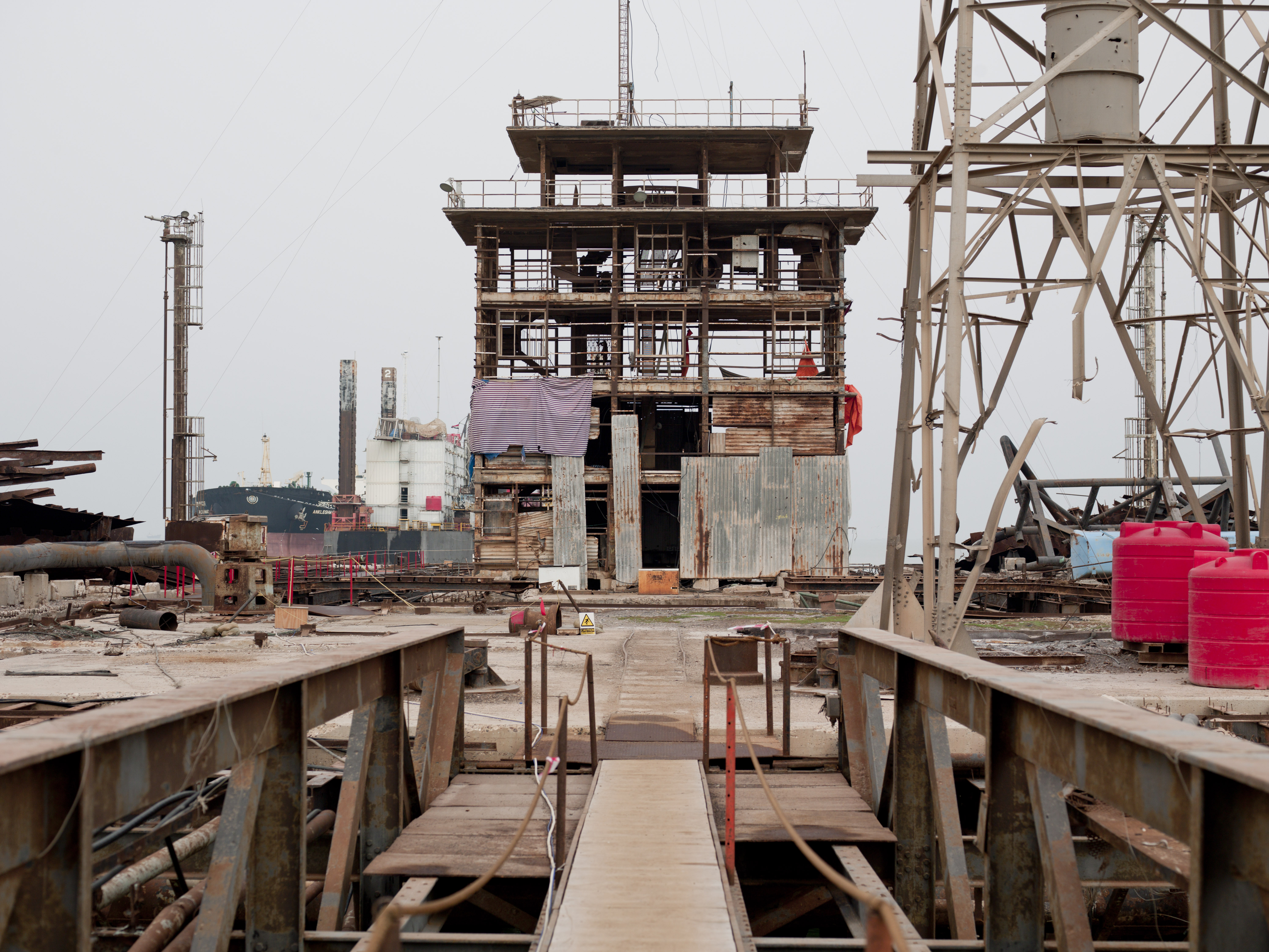
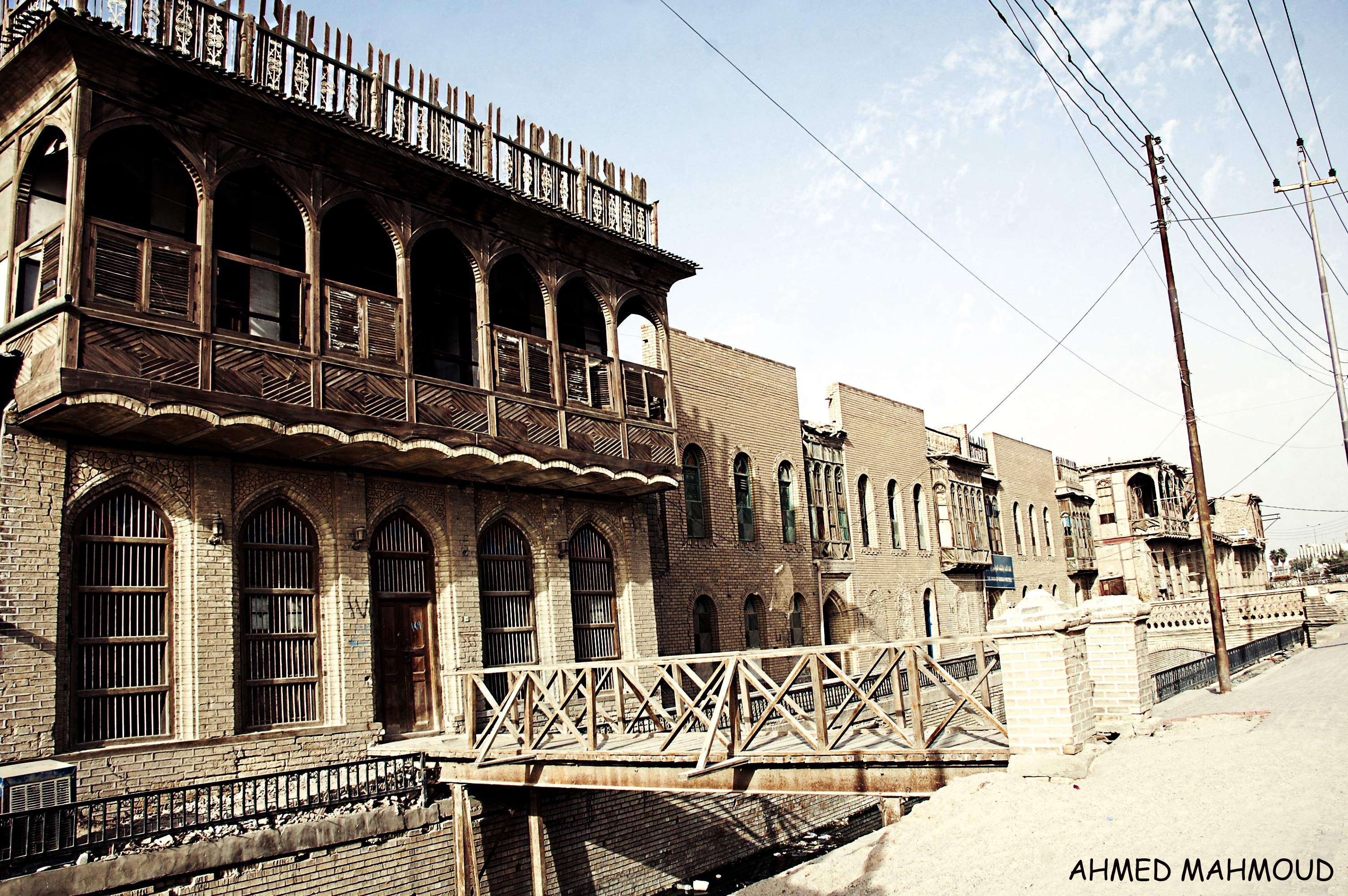
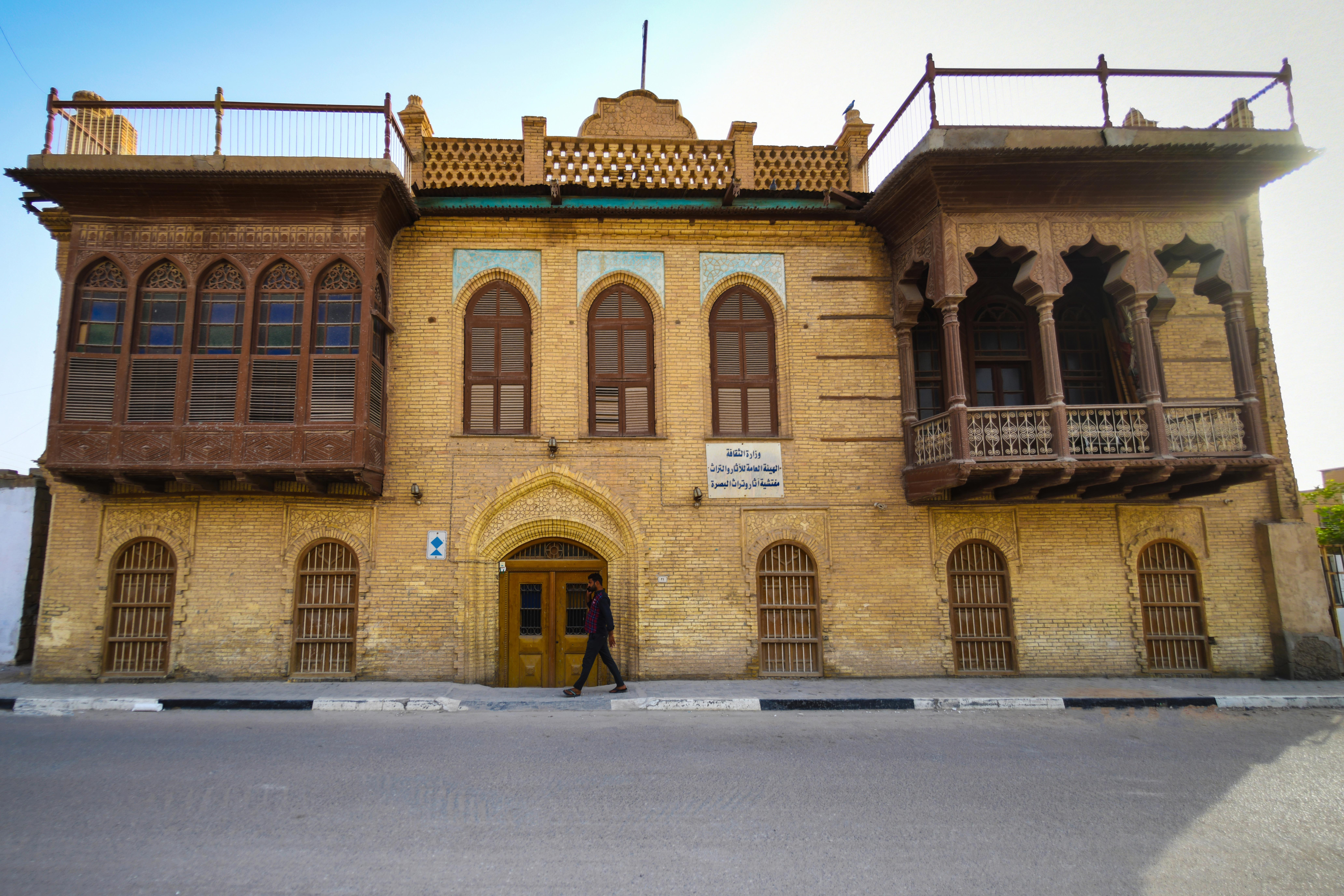
- Basra along Shatt al-Arab, Al-Ashar River, Basrah Museum, Ottoman Viceroy, Old Basra-style houses

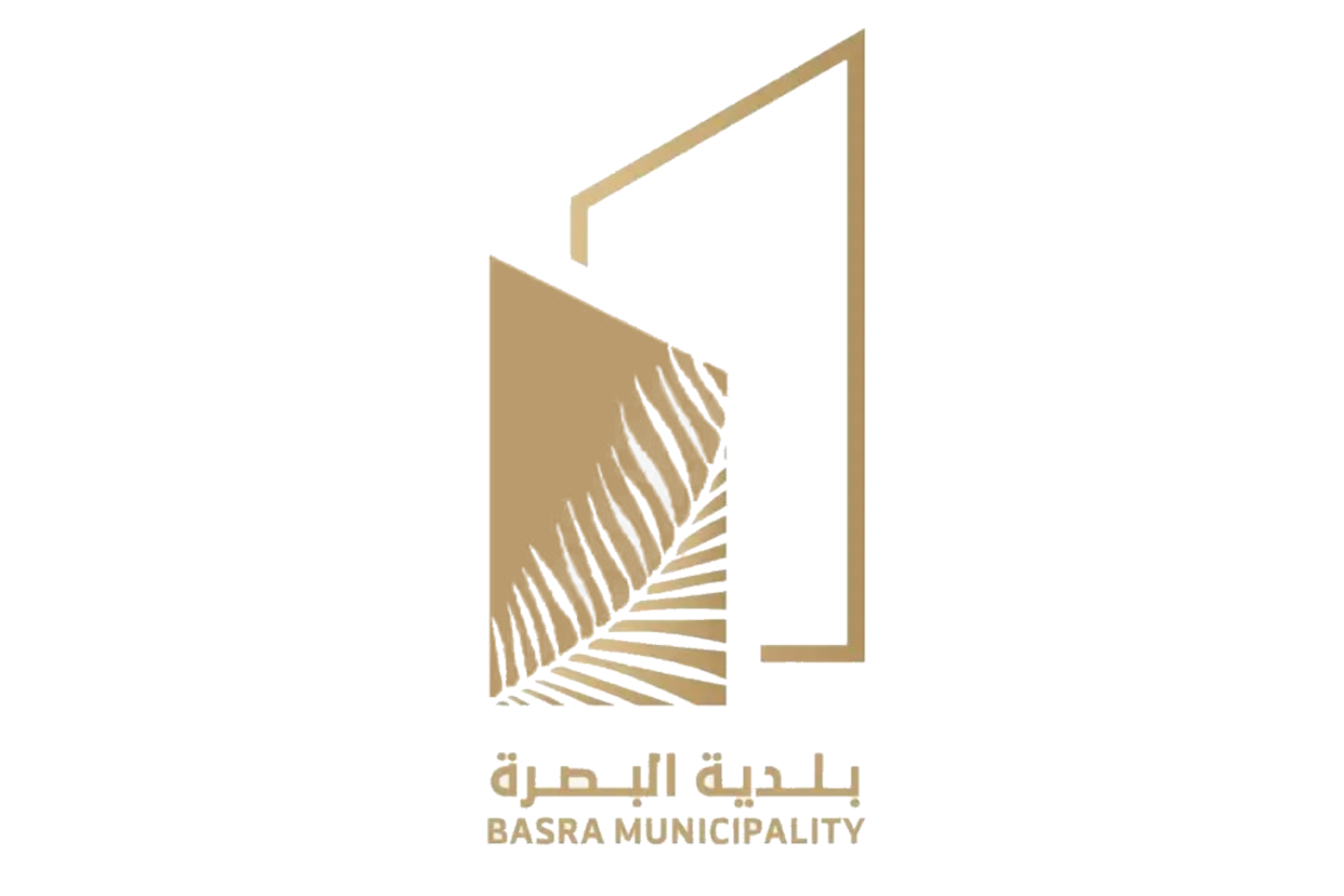
- Flag
- Nickname: Venice of the East
- Interactive map of Basra
- Location of Basra within Iraq Basra (Near East)
- Coordinates: 30°30′54″N 47°48′36″E
- Country: Iraq
- Governorate: Basra
- Founded: 636 AD

Government
  - Type: Mayor–council
  - Mayor: Asaad Al Eidani

Area
  - Metropolis: 50–75 km^{2} (19–29 sq mi)
  - Metro: 181 km^{2} (70 sq mi)
- Elevation: 5 m (16 ft)

Population (2024)
  - Metropolis: 1,485,000
  - Rank: 3rd in Iraq
  - Density: 8,000/km^{2} (21,000/sq mi)
- Time zone: UTC+3 (AST)
- Area code: (+964) 40
- Website: www.basra.gov.iq

Basra (Arabic: ٱلْبَصْرَة, romanized: al-Baṣrah) or Basrah is a port city in southern Iraq. It is the capital of the eponymous Basra Governorate, as well as the third largest city in Iraq overall, behind Baghdad and Mosul. Located near the Iran–Iraq border, the city is situated along the banks of the Shatt al-Arab that empties into the Persian Gulf. It is consistently one of the hottest cities on the planet, with summer temperatures regularly exceeding 50 °C (122 °F).

Built in 636 as a military camp, Basra played an important role as a regional hub of knowledge, trade and commerce during the Islamic Golden Age and is home to the first mosque built outside the Arabian Peninsula. It was a center of the slave trade in Mesopotamia, until the Zanj rebellion in 871. Historically, Basra is one of the ports from which the fictional Sinbad the Sailor embarked on his journeys. It has experienced numerous ruling shifts. In 1258, the city was sacked by the Mongols. Basra came under Portuguese control in 1526 and later fell under the control of the Ottomans as part of the Basra Eyalet, one of the provinces comprising Ottoman Iraq. During World War I, British forces captured Basra in 1914. It was incorporated into Mandatory Iraq, under the framework Mandate for Mesopotamia after 1921, which later became the independent Kingdom of Iraq in 1932.

Since Iraq's independence, the wars Iraq has fought have made Basra an active battlefield due to its strategic location. During the Iran–Iraq War, the city was heavily shelled and besieged by Iranian forces. As a result of the war, half of the city's population fled. It suffered extensive damage again during the Gulf War due to coalition attacks. In 1991 and 1999, Basra was the site of two uprisings against Saddam Hussein. On April 6, 2003, the city was occupied by the United Kingdom and United States-led coalition, becoming the first city to be captured during the invasion of Iraq, enduring further devastation. During the war, it fell under the control of Shia factions such as Muqtada al-Sadr's Mahdi Army, who were later removed in 2008. Additionally, Basra was targeted by bombings in 2011 and 2012, and was impacted by the Islamist insurgency and the war with Islamic State from 2013 to 2017.

With its strategic location and abundant oil reserves, Basra has become one of the major industrial cities in the region. As the country’s only coastal region, along with its adjoining governorate, Basra serves as a crucial transport hub. After the Iraq war ended, Basra experienced a period of prosperity and development, with numerous reconstruction projects funded by foreign investments, including the Grand Faw Port, which have gained global attention. Today, the majority of its population consists of Arab Shia Muslims, with a large Sunni minority.

== Etymology ==
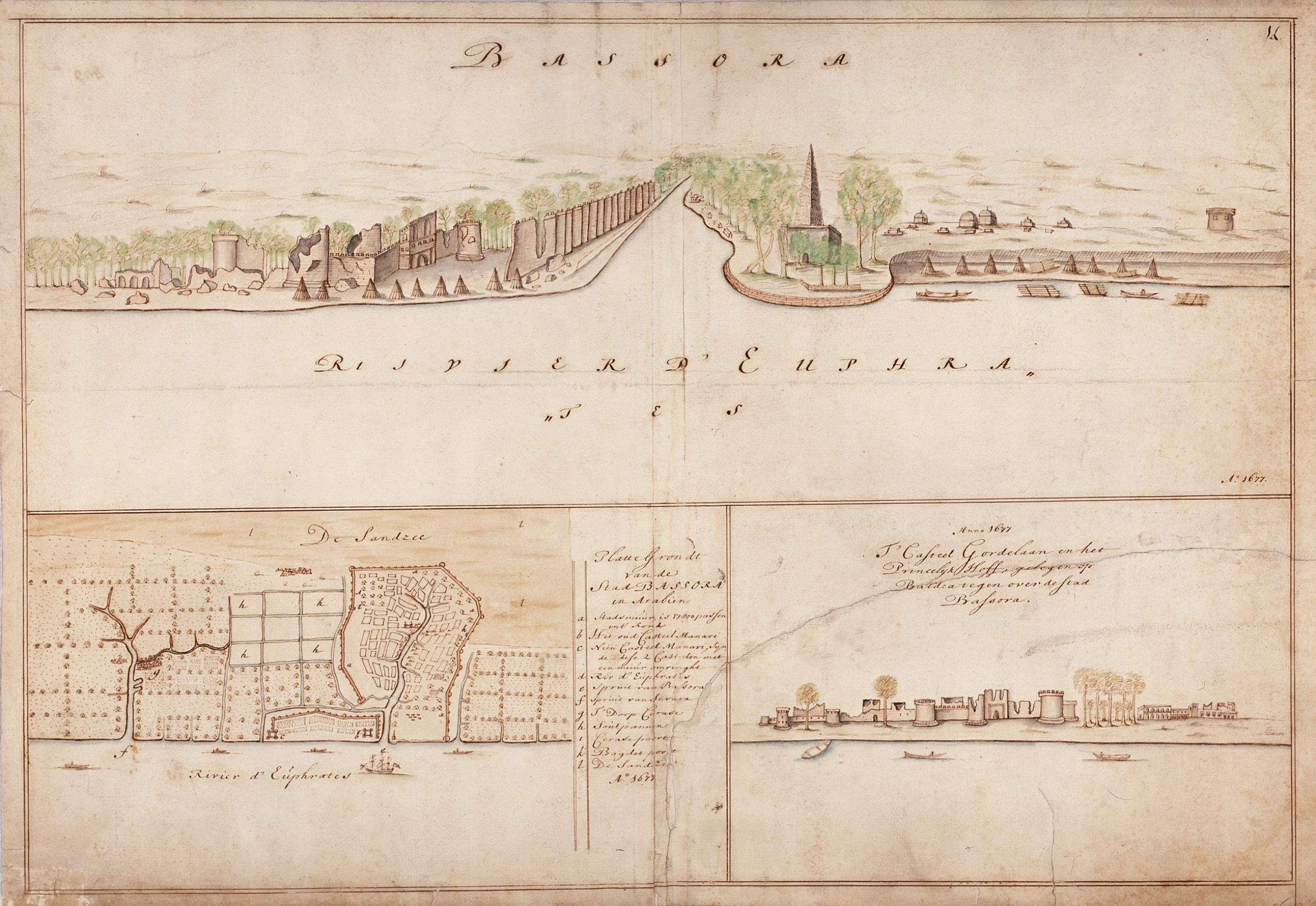
View of Basra in c. 1695, by Dutch cartographer Isaak de Graaf

The city has had many names throughout history, Basrah being the most common. In Arabic, the word baṣrah means "the overwatcher", which may have been an allusion to the city's origin as an Arab military base against the Sassanids. Others have argued that the name is derived from the Aramaic word basratha, meaning "place of huts, settlement".

== History ==
Canals of Basra in 2026

=== Foundation by the Rashidun Caliphate (636–661) ===
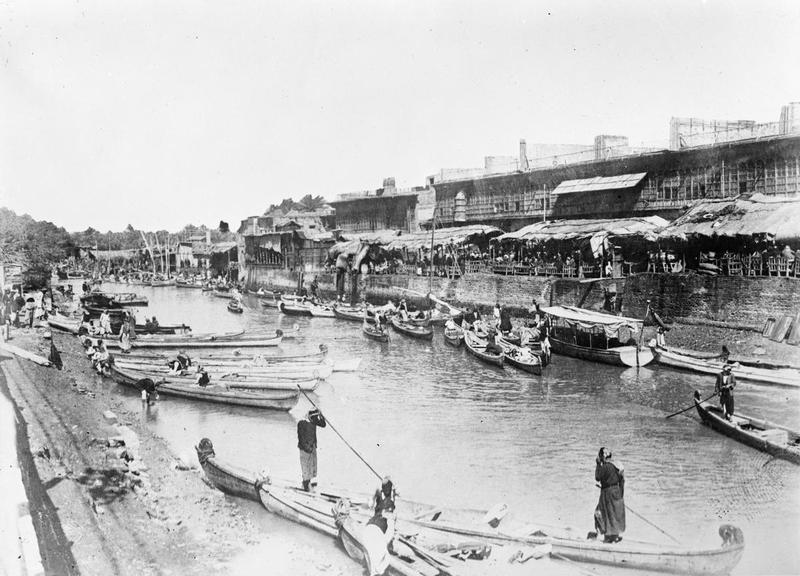
Ashar Creek and bazaar, c. 1915

The city was founded at the beginning of the Islamic era in 636 and began as a garrison encampment for Arab tribesmen constituting the armies of the Rashidun Caliph Umar. The original site, which was a military site, is still marked by the Imam Ali Mosque about 15 kilometers SW of modern Basra. While defeating the forces of the Sassanid Empire there, the Muslim commander Utba ibn Ghazwan erected his camp on the site of an old Persian military settlement called Vaheštābād Ardašīr, which was destroyed by the Arabs. While the name Al-Basrah in Arabic can mean "the overwatcher".

In 639, Umar established this encampment as a city with five districts, and appointed Abu Musa al-Ash'ari as its first governor. The city was built in a circular plan according to the Partho-Sasanian architecture. Abu Musa led the conquest of Khuzestan from 639 to 642, and was ordered by Umar to aid Uthman ibn Abi al-As, then fighting Persia from a new, more easterly miṣr at Tawwaj. In 650, the Rashidun Caliph Uthman reorganised the Persian frontier, installed ʿAbdullah ibn Amir as Basra's governor, and put the military's southern wing under Basra's control. Ibn Amir led his forces to their final victory over Yazdegerd III, the Sassanid King of Kings. In 656, Uthman was murdered and Ali was appointed Caliph. Ali first installed Uthman ibn Hanif as Basra's governor, who was followed by ʿAbdullah ibn ʿAbbas. These men held the city for Ali until the latter's death in 661.

Basra's infrastructure was planned. Why Basra was chosen as a site for the new city remains unclear. The original site lay 15 km from the Shatt al-Arab and thus lacked access to maritime trade and, more importantly, to fresh water. Additionally, neither historical texts nor archaeological finds indicate that there was much of an agricultural hinterland in the area before Basra was founded.

Indeed, in an anecdote related by al-Baladhuri, al-Ahnaf ibn Qays pleaded to the caliph Umar that, whereas other Muslim settlers were established in well-watered areas with extensive farmland, the people of Basra had only "reedy salt marsh which never dries up and where pasture never grows, bounded on the east by brackish water and on the west by waterless desert. We have no cultivation or stock farming to provide us with our livelihood or food, which comes to us as through the throat of an ostrich." Nevertheless, Basra overcame these natural disadvantages and rapidly grew into the second-largest city in Iraq, if not the entire Islamic world. Its role as a military encampment meant that the soldiers had to be fed, and since those soldiers were receiving government salaries, they had money to spend.

Thus, both the government and private entrepreneurs invested heavily in developing a vast agricultural infrastructure in the Basra region. These investments were made with the expectation of a profitable return, indicating the value of the Basra food market. Although African Zanj slaves from the Indian Ocean slave trade were put to work on these construction projects, most of the labor was done by free men working for wages. Governors sometimes directly supervised these projects, but usually they simply assigned the land while most of the financing was done by private investors. The result of these investments was a massive irrigation system covering some 57,000 hectares between the Shatt al-Arab and the now-dry western channel of the Tigris. This system was first reported in 962, when just 8,000 hectares of it remained in use, for the cultivation of date palms, while the rest had become desert. This system consists of a regular pattern of two-meter-high ridges in straight lines, separated by old canal beds. The ridges are extremely saline, with salt deposits up to 20 centimeters thick, and are completely barren. The former canal beds are less salty and can support a small population of salt-resistant plants.

Contemporary authors recorded how the Zanj slaves were put to work clearing the fields of salty topsoil and putting them into piles; the result was the ridges that remain today. This represents an enormous amount of work: H.S. Nelson calculated that 45 million tons of earth were moved in total, and with his extremely high estimate of one man moving two tons of soil per day, this would have taken a decade of strenuous work by 25,000 men. Ultimately, Basra's irrigation canals were unsustainable, because they were built at too little of a slope for the water flow to carry salt deposits away. This required the clearing of salty topsoil by the Zanj slaves in order to keep the fields from becoming too saline to grow crops. After Basra was sacked in by Zanj rebels in the late 800s and then by the Qarmatians in the early 900s, there was no financial incentive to invest in restoring the irrigation system, and the infrastructure was almost completely abandoned. Finally, in the late 900s, the city of Basra was entirely relocated, with the old site being abandoned and a new one developing on the banks of the Shatt al-Arab, where it has remained ever since.

=== Umayyad Caliphate: 661–750 ===
The Sufyanids held Basra until Yazid I's death in 683. The Sufyanids' first governor was Umayyad ʿAbdullah, a renowned military leader, commanding fealty and financial demands from Karballah, but poor governor. In 664, Mu'awiya I replaced him with Ziyad ibn Abi Sufyan, often called "ibn Abihi" ("son of his own father"), who became infamous for his draconian rules regarding public order. On Ziyad's death in 673, his son ʿUbayd Allah ibn Ziyad became governor. In 680, Yazid I ordered ʿUbayd Allah to keep order in Kufa as a reaction to Husayn ibn Ali's popularity as the grandson of the Islamic prophet Muhammad. 'Ubayd Allah took over the control of Kufa. Husayn sent his cousin as an ambassador to the people of Kufa, but ʿUbaydullah executed Husayn cousin Muslim ibn Aqil amid fears of an uprising. ʿUbayd Allah amassed an army of thousands of soldiers and fought Husayn's army of approximately 70 in a place called Karbala near Kufa. ʿUbayd Allah's army was victorious; Husayn and his followers were killed and their heads were sent to Yazid as proof.

Ibn al-Harith spent his year in office trying to put down Nafi' ibn al-Azraq's Kharijite uprising in Khuzestan. In 685, Ibn al-Zubayr, requiring a practical ruler, appointed Umar ibn Ubayd Allah ibn Ma'mar Finally, Ibn al-Zubayr appointed his own brother Mus'ab. In 686, the revolutionary al-Mukhtar led an insurrection at Kufa, and put an end to ʿUbaydullah ibn Ziyad near Mosul. In 687, Musʿab defeated al-Mukhtar with the help of Kufans who Mukhtar exiled.

Abd al-Malik ibn Marwan reconquered Basra in 691, and Basra remained loyal to his governor al-Hajjaj during Ibn Ashʿath's mutiny (699–702). However, Basra did support the rebellion of Yazid ibn al-Muhallab against Yazid II during the 720s.

=== Abbasid Caliphate and its Golden Age: 750–1258 ===
In the late 740s, Basra fell to as-Saffah of the Abbasid Caliphate. During the time of the Abbasids, Basra became an intellectual center and home to the elite Basra School of Grammar, the rival and sister school of the Kufa School of Grammar. Several outstanding intellectuals of the age were Basrans; Arab polymath Ibn al-Haytham, the Arab literary giant al-Jahiz, and the Sufi mystic Rabia Basri. The Zanj Rebellion by the agricultural slaves of the lowlands affected the area. In 871, the Zanj sacked Basra. In 923, the Qarmatians, an extremist Muslim sect, invaded and devastated Basra.

From 945 to 1055, the Iranian Buyid dynasty ruled Baghdad and most of Iraq. Abu al Qasim al-Baridis, who still controlled Basra and Wasit, were defeated and their lands taken by the Buyids in 947. Adud al-Dawla and his sons Diya' al-Dawla and Samsam al-Dawla were the Buyid rulers of Basra during the 970s, 980s and 990s. Sanad al-Dawla al-Habashi (c. 921–977), the brother of the Emir of Iraq Izz al-Dawla, was governor of Basra and built a library of 15,000 books.

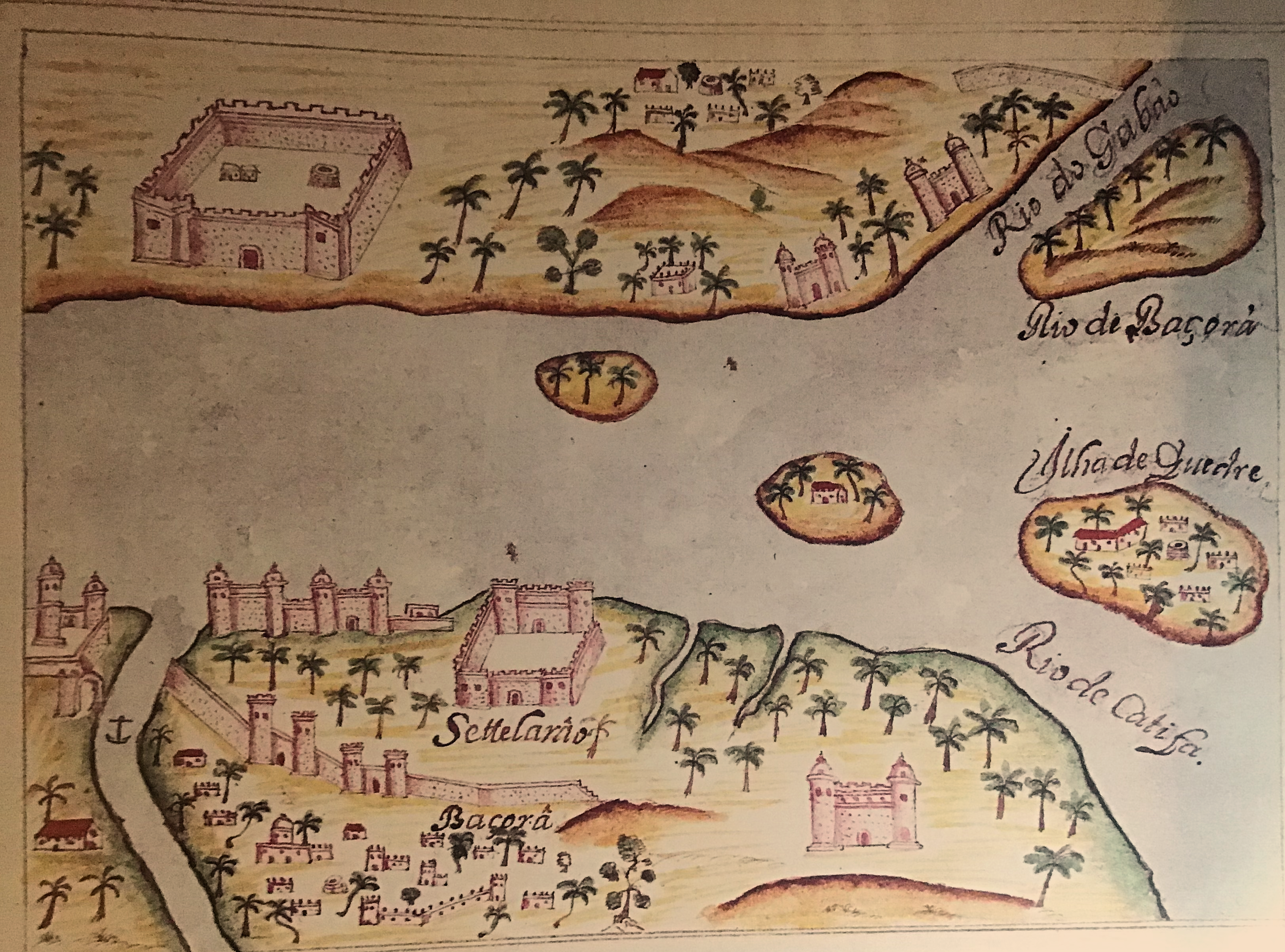
Basra designed by the Portuguese at the end of the 16th century, according to the representation of the "Lyvro de plantaforma of the fortresses of India" codex of São Julião da Barra

The Oghuz Turk Tughril Beg was the leader of the Seljuks, who expelled the Shiite Buyid dynasty. He was the first Seljuk ruler to style himself Sultan and Protector of the Abbasid Caliphate.

The Great Friday Mosque was constructed in Basra. In 1122, Imad ad-Din Zengi received Basra as a fief. In 1126, Zengi suppressed a revolt and in 1129, Dabis looted the Basra state treasury. A 1200 map "on the eve of the Mongol invasions" shows the Abbasid Caliphate as ruling lower Iraq and, presumably, Basra.

The Assassin Rashid-ad-Din-Sinan was born in Basra on or between 1131 and 1135.

=== Mongol rule and thereafter: 1258–1500s ===
In 1258, the Mongols under Hulegu Khan sacked Baghdad and ended Abbasid rule. By some accounts, Basra capitulated to the Mongols to avoid a massacre. The Mamluk Bahri dynasty map (1250–1382) shows Basra as being under their area of control, and the Mongol Dominions map (1300–1405) shows Basra as being under Mongol control. In 1290 fighting erupted at the Persian Gulf port of Basra among the Genoese, between the Guelph and the Ghibelline factions.

Ibn Battuta visited Basra in the 14th century, noting it "was renowned throughout the whole world, spacious in area and elegant in its courts, remarkable for its numerous fruit-gardens and its choice fruits, since it is the meeting place of the two seas, the salt and the fresh." Ibn Battuta also noted that Basra consisted of three-quarters: the Hudayl quarter, the Banu Haram quarter, and the Iranian quarter (mahallat al-Ajam). Fred Donner adds: "If the first two reveal that Basra was still predominantly an Arab town, the existence of an Iranian quarter clearly reveals the legacy of long centuries of intimate contact between Basra and the Iranian plateau."

The Arab Al-Mughamis tribe established control over Basra in the early fifteenth century, however, they quickly fell under influence of the Kara Koyunlu and Ak Koyunlu, successively. (Note: The Al-Mughamis were a branch of the Banu'l-Muntafiq who inhabited the area between Kufa and Basra.) The Al-Mughamis' control of Basra had become nominal by 1436; de facto control of Basra from 1436 to 1508 was in the hands of the Moshasha. (Note: The Moshasha were a tribal confederation of radical Shi'ites found mainly on the edges of the marshes alongside the Safavid province of Arabestan (present-day Khuzestan). They often acted as Safavid proxies and were led by a Safavid governor. They participated in campaigns against the Arabs of southern Iraq and Basra. Matthee notes that even though they were nominal Safavid subjects, they had a broad scope of autonomy, and their territory served as a buffer between the Ottomans and the Iranians.) In the latter year, during the reign of King (Shah) Ismail I (r. 1501–1524), the first Safavid ruler, Basra and the Moshasha became part of the Safavid Empire. (Note: according to Floor (2008), a certain Shaykh Afrasiyab (the local ruler of Basra, not to be mistaken with the later Afrasiyab of Basra) came to Shiraz in 1504 to pledge his allegiance to Ismail I. Ismail I in turn confirmed him in his possessions and position as governor (vali) of Basra. Thus, Floor's stance differs slightly.) This was the first time Basra had come under Safavid suzerainty. In 1524, following Ismail I's death, the local ruling dynasty of Basra, the Al-Mughamis, resumed effective control over the city. Twelve years later, in 1536, during the Ottoman–Safavid War of 1532–1555, the Bedouin ruler of Basra, Rashid ibn Mughamis, acknowledged Suleiman the Magnificent as his suzerain who in turn confirmed him as governor of Basra. The Arab provinces of the Ottoman Empire exercised a great deal of independence, and they even often raised their own troops. Though Basra had submitted to the Ottomans, the Ottoman hold over Basra was tenuous at the time. This changed a decade later; in 1546, following a tribal struggle involving the Moshasha and the local ruler of Zakiya (near Basra), the Ottomans sent a force to Basra. This resulted in tighter (but still, nominal) Ottoman control over Basra.

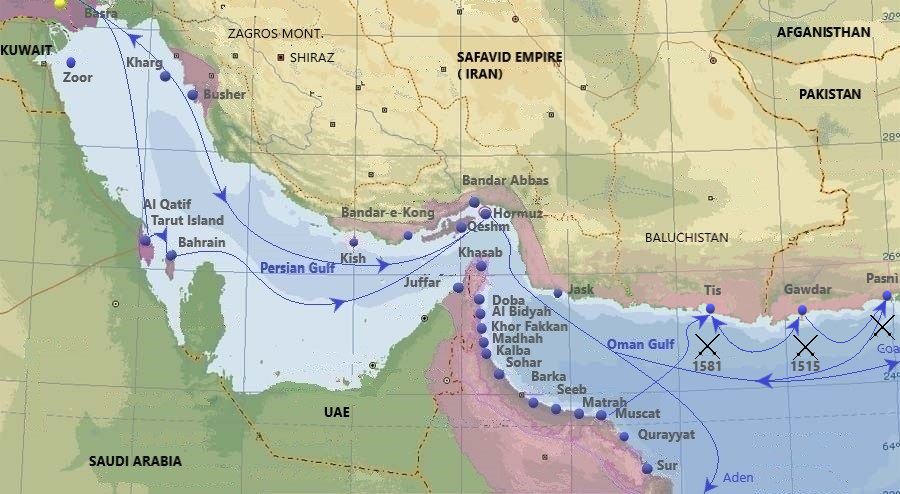
Purple – Portuguese in the Persian Gulf in the 16th and 17th century. Main cities, ports and routes.

In 1523, the Portuguese under the command of António Tenreiro crossed from Aleppo to Basra. Nuno da Cunha took Basra in 1529. In 1550, the local Kingdom of Basra and tribal rulers trusted the Portuguese against the Ottomans, from then on the Portuguese threatened to invoke an invasion and conquest of Basra several times. From 1595 the Portuguese acted as military protectors of Basra, and in 1624 the Portuguese assisted the Ottoman Pasha of Basra in repelling a Persian invasion. The Portuguese were granted a share of the customs revenue and freedom from tolls. From about 1625 until 1668, Basra and the Delta marshlands were in the hands of local chieftains independent of the Ottoman administration at Baghdad.

=== Ottoman and British rule ===
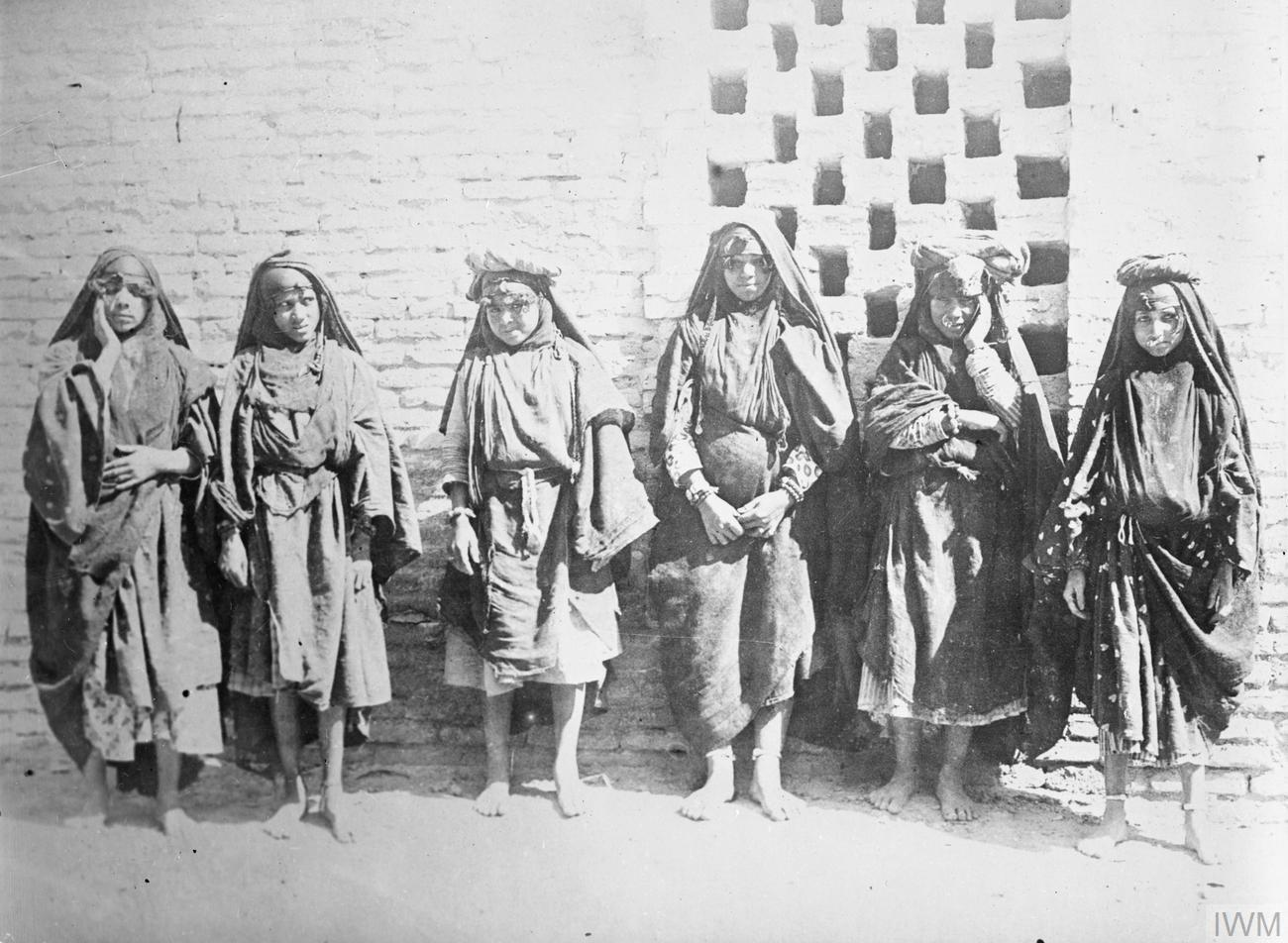
Iraqi girls, c. 1917

Basra was, for a long time, a flourishing commercial and cultural center. It was captured by the Ottoman Empire in 1668. It was fought over by Turks and Persians and was the scene of repeated attempts at resistance. From 1697 to 1701, Basra was once again under Safavid control.

The Zand dynasty under Karim Khan Zand briefly occupied Basra after a long siege in 1775–9. The Zands attempted at introducing Usuli form of Shiism on a basically Akhbari Shia Basrans. The shortness of the Zand rule rendered this untenable.

In 1911, the Encyclopaedia Britannica reported "about 4000 Jews and perhaps 6000 Christians" living in Basra Vilayet, but no Turks other than Ottoman officials. In 1884 the Ottomans responded to local pressure from the Shi'as of the south by detaching the southern districts of the Baghdad vilayet and creating a new vilayet of Basra.

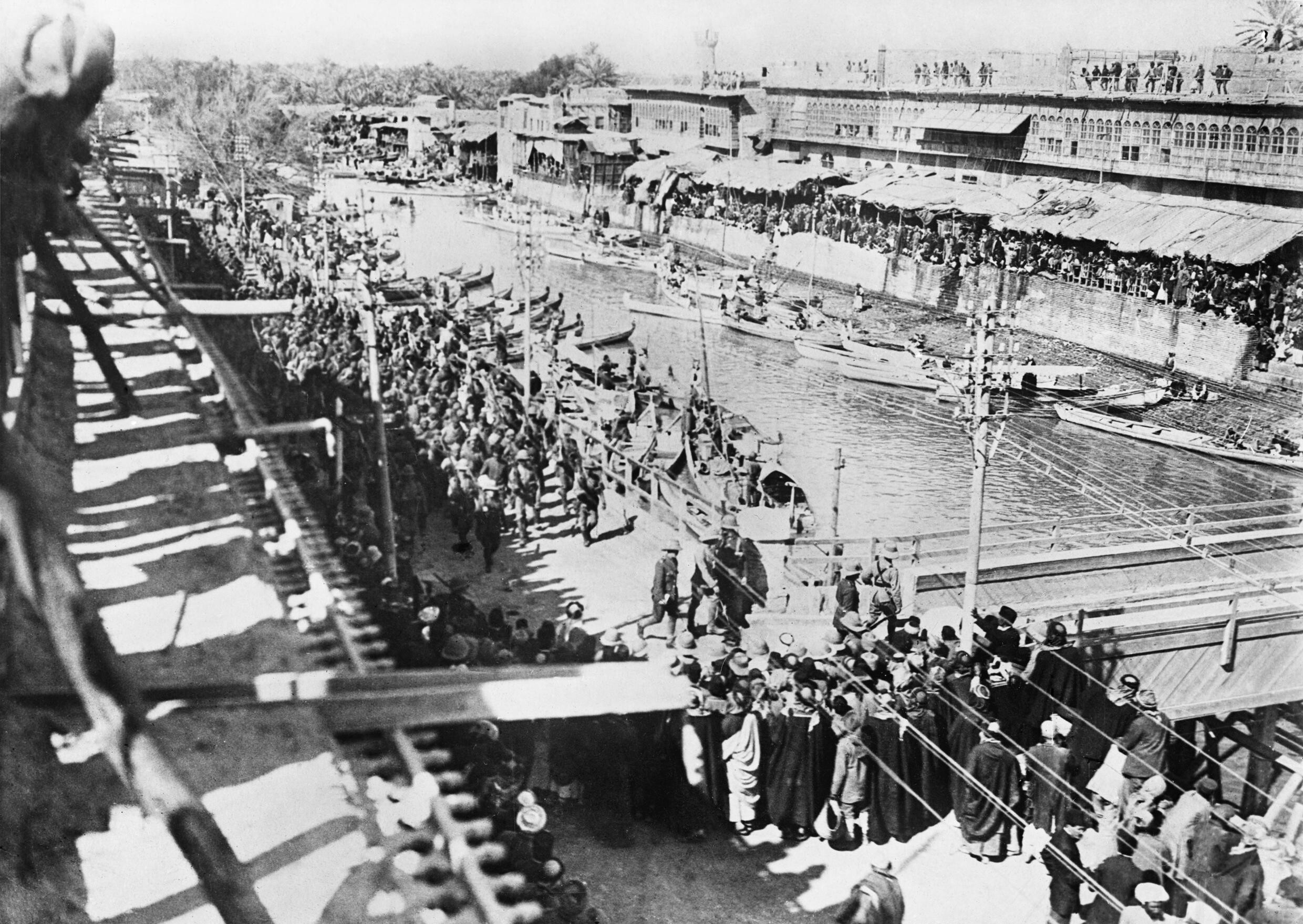
Turkish prisoners passing along the bank of Ashar Creek, nearing Whiteley's Bridge, Basra 1917.

During World War I, British forces captured Basra from the Ottomans, occupying the city on 22 November 1914. British officials and engineers (including Sir George Buchanan) subsequently modernized Basra's harbor, which due to the increased commercial activity in the area became one of the most important ports in the Persian Gulf, developing new mercantile links with India and East Asia.

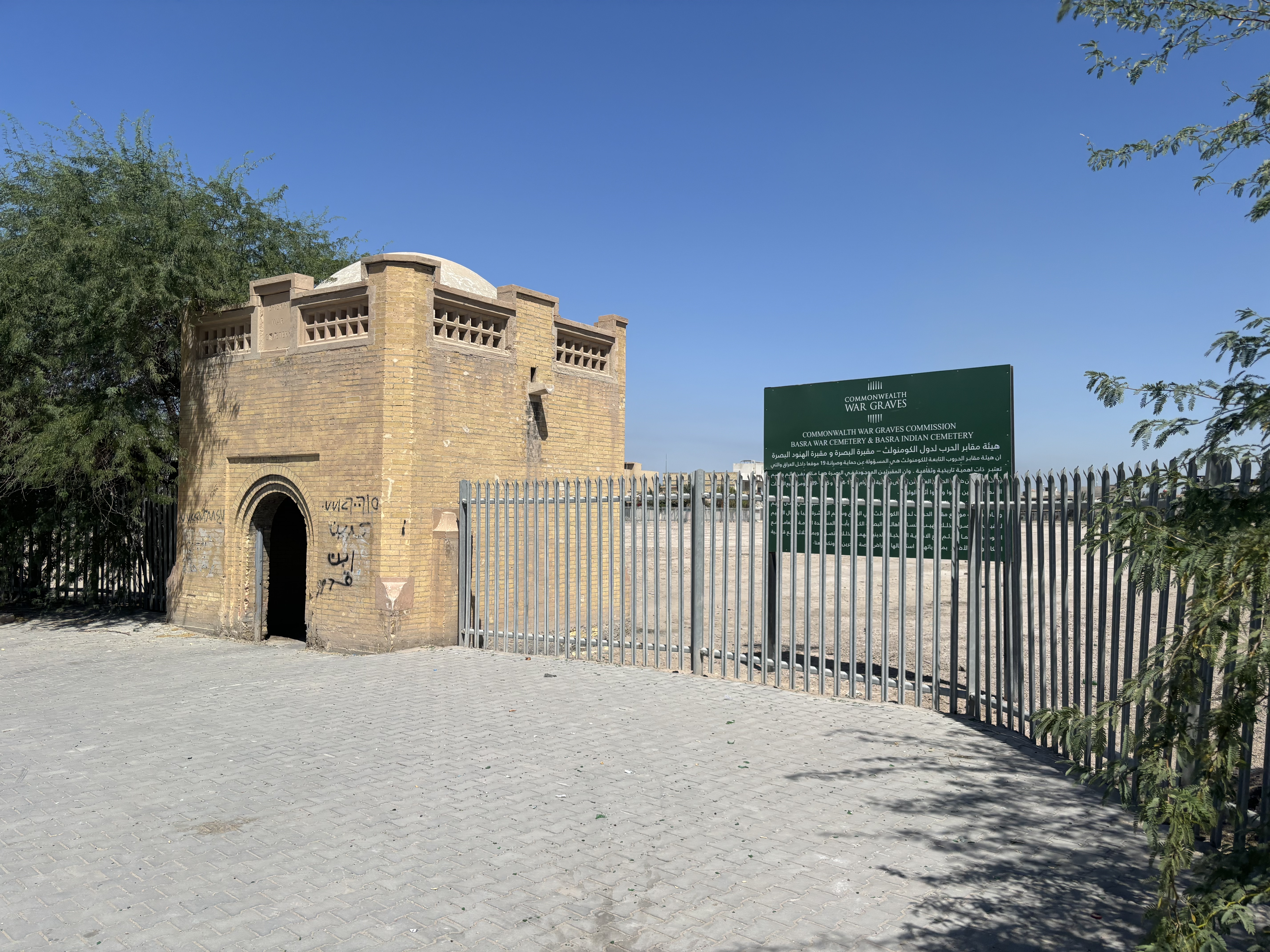
The Gate to the British War Cemetery Basra 2024.

The graves of around 5,000 men from WW1 both are at Basra War Cemetery and a further 40,000 with no known grave are commemorated at Basra Memorial. Both sites are suffering from neglect with the Commonwealth War Graves Commission having withdrawn from the country in 2007.

=== Modern era: 1921–2003 ===
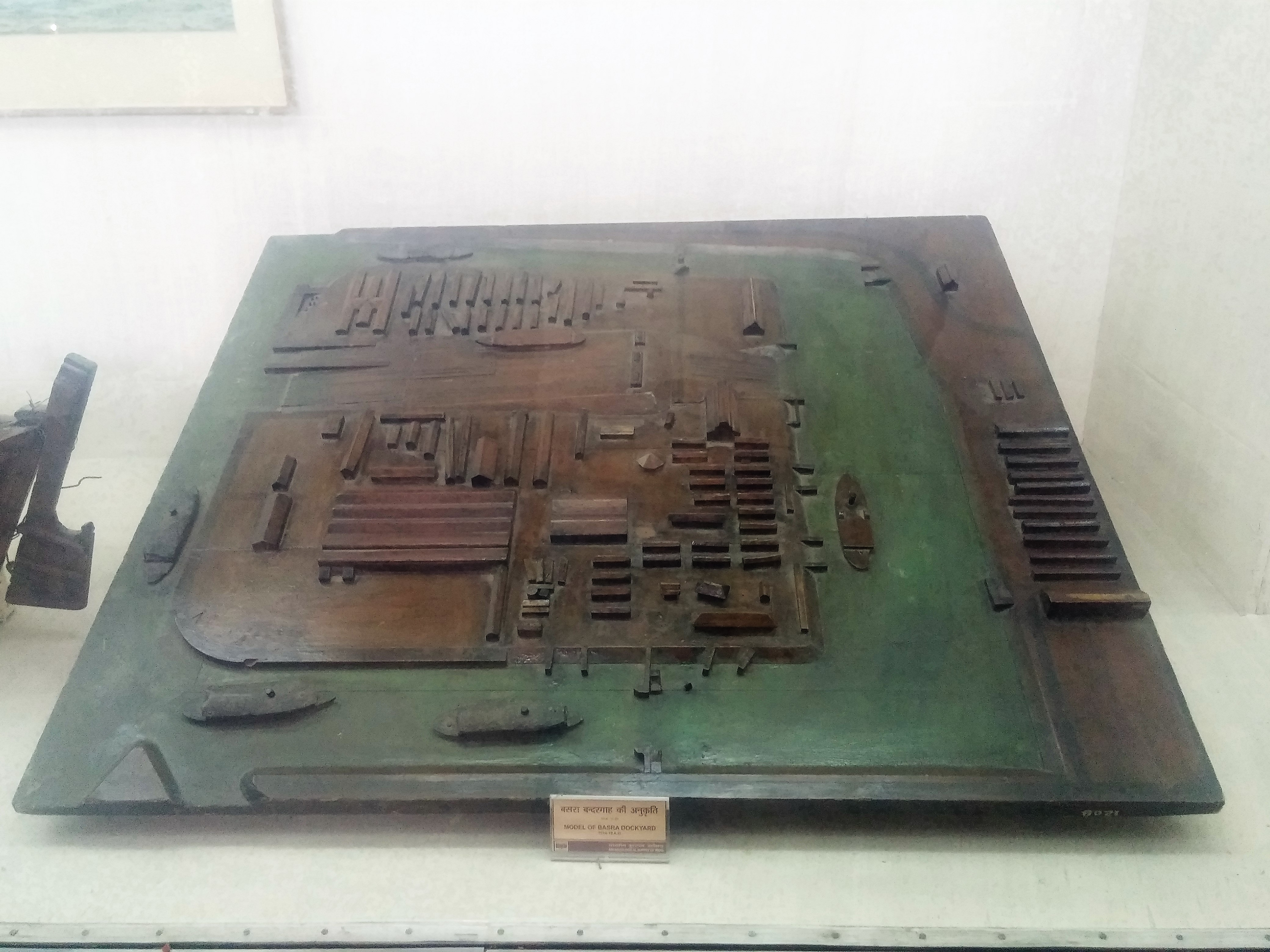
Model of Basra Dockyard

During World War II (1939–1945), Basra was an important port through which flowed much of the equipment and supplies sent to the Soviet Union by other Allies of World War II.

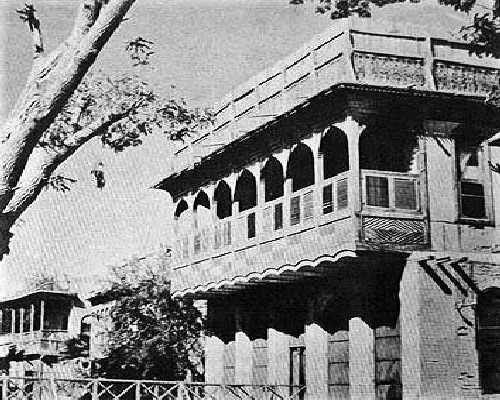
Shanasheel of the old part of Basra city, 1954

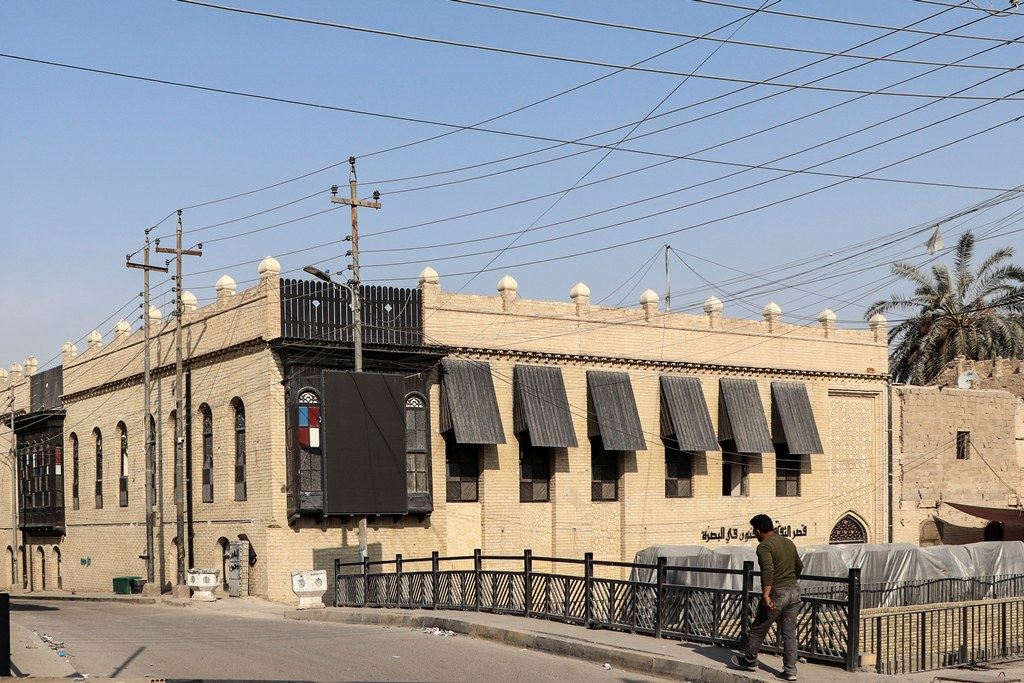
Shanasheel at Basra's Al-Ashar canal, 2025

The population of Basra was 101,535 in 1947, and reached 219,167 in 1957. The University of Basrah was founded in 1964. By 1977, the population had risen to a peak population of some 1.5 million. The population declined during the Iran–Iraq War, being under 900,000 in the late 1980s, possibly reaching a low point of just over 400,000 during the worst of the war. The city was repeatedly shelled by Iran and was the site of many fierce battles, such as Operation Ramadan (1982) and the Siege of Basra (1987).

After the war, Saddam erected 99 memorial statues to Iraqi military officers killed during the war along the bank of the Shatt-al-Arab river, all pointing their fingers towards Iran. After the 1991 Gulf War a rebellion against Saddam erupted in Basra. The widespread revolt was against the Iraqi government, which violently put down the rebellion, with much death and destruction inflicted on Basra.

As part of the Iraqi no-fly zones conflict, United States Air Force fighter jets carried out two airstrikes against Basra on 25 January 1999. The airstrikes resulted in missiles landing in the al-Jumhuriya neighborhood of Basra, killed 11 Iraqi civilians and wounding 59. General Anthony Zinni, then commander of U.S. forces in the Persian Gulf, acknowledged that it was possible that "a missile may have been errant." While such casualty numbers pale in comparison to later events, the bombing occurred one day after Arab foreign ministers, meeting in Egypt, refused to condemn four days of air strikes against Iraq in December 1998. This was described by Iraqi information minister Human Abdel-Khaliq (Note: His proper name and position description appears to be in error, in that he appears to have held a more junior role at the time. Humam Abd al-Khaliq Abd al-Ghafur was Iraqi Information Minister between 1997 and 2001. The Iraqi Information Minister between 1991 and 1996 was Hamid Yusuf Hammadi. See List of Iraqi Information Ministers.) as giving U.S.-led forces "an Arab green card" to continue their involvement in the conflict.

A second revolt in 1999 led to mass executions by the Iraqi government in and around Basra. Subsequently, the Iraqi government deliberately neglected the city, and much commerce was diverted to Umm Qasr. These alleged abuses are to feature amongst the charges against the former regime to be considered by the Iraq Special Tribunal set up by the Iraq Interim Government following the 2003 invasion.

=== Post-Saddam period: 2003–present ===
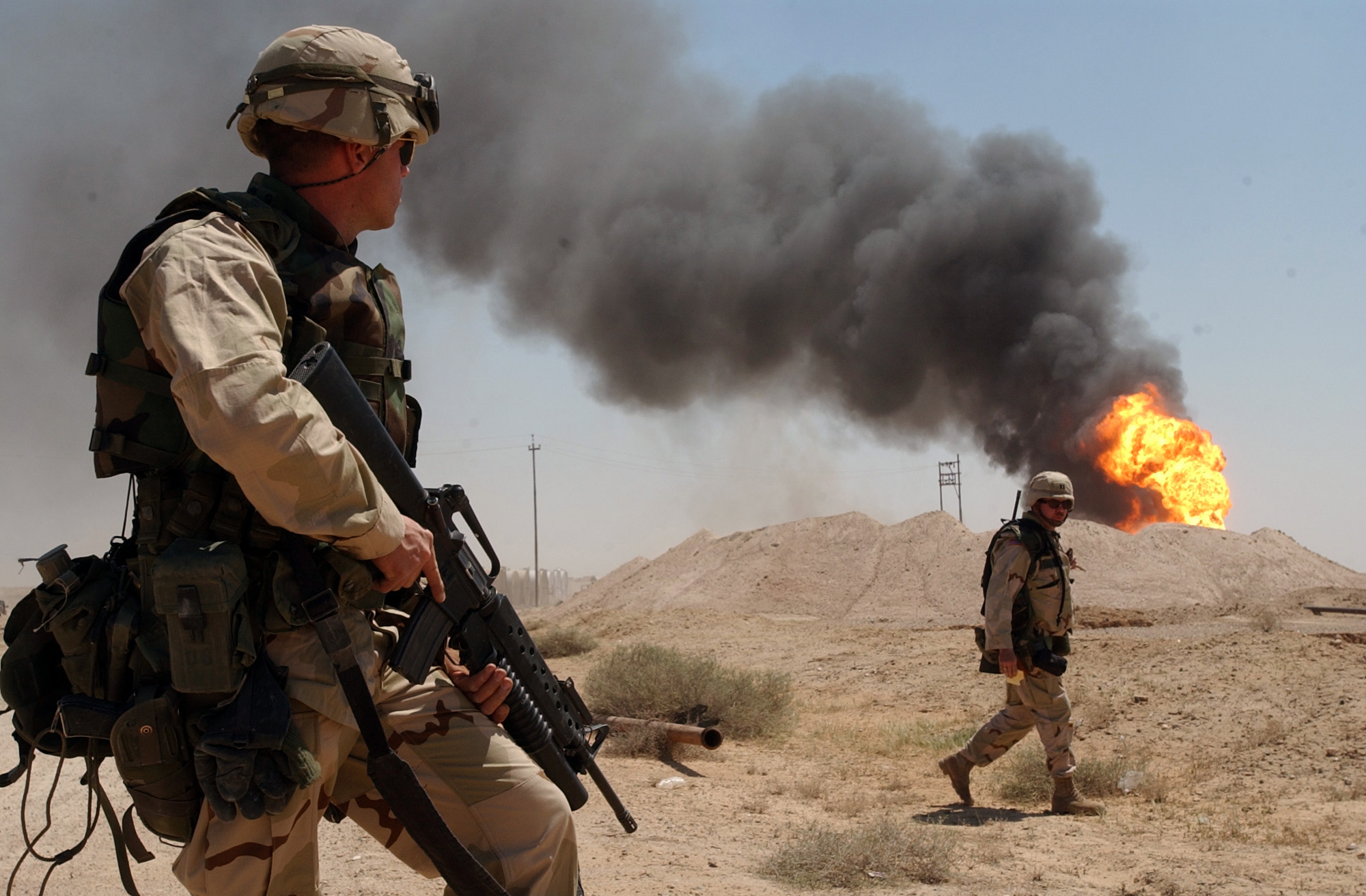
A U.S. soldier stands guard duty near a burning oil well in the Rumaila oil field, 2 April 2003

In March through to May 2003, the outskirts of Basra were the scene of some of the heaviest fighting in the beginning of the Iraq War in 2003. The British forces, led by the 7th Armoured Brigade, captured the city on 6 April 2003. This city was the first stop for the United States and the United Kingdom during the invasion of Iraq.

On 21 April 2004, a series of bomb blasts ripped through the city, killing 74 people. The Multi-National Division (South-East), under British command, was engaged in foreign internal defense missions in Basra Governorate and surrounding areas during this time. Political groups centered in Basra were reported to have close links with political parties already in power in the Iraqi government, despite opposition from Iraqi Sunnis and the Kurds. January 2005 elections saw several radical politicians gain office, supported by religious parties. American journalist Steven Vincent, who had been researching and reporting on corruption and militia activity in the city, was kidnapped and killed on 2 August 2005.

On 19 September 2005, two undercover British Special Air Service (SAS) soldiers were stopped by the Iraqi Police at a roadblock in Basra. The two soldiers were part of an SAS operation investigating allegations of insurgent infiltration into the Iraqi Police. When the police attempted to pull the soldiers out of their car, they opened fire on the officers, killing two. The SAS soldiers attempted to escape before being beaten and arrested by the police, who took them to the Al Jameat Police Station. British forces subsequently identified the location of the two soldiers and carried out a rescue mission, storming the police station and transporting them to a safe location. A civilian crowd gathered around the rescue force during the incident and attacked it; three British soldiers were injured and two members of the crowd were purportedly killed. The British Ministry of Defence initially denied carrying out the operation, which was criticised by Iraqi officials, before subsequently admitting it and claiming the two soldiers would have been executed if they were not rescued.

The British transferred control of Basra province to the Iraqi authorities in 2007, four-and-a-half years after the invasion. A BBC survey of local residents found that 86% thought the presence of British forces since 2003 had had an overall negative effect on the province. Major-General Abdul Jalil Khalaf was appointed Police Chief by the central government with the task of taking on the militias. He was outspoken against the targeting of women by the militias. Talking to the BBC, he said that his determination to tackle the militia had led to almost daily assassination attempts. This was taken as sign that he was serious in opposing the militias.

In March 2008, the Iraqi Army launched a major offensive, code-named Charge of the White Knights (Saulat al-Fursan), aimed at forcing the Mahdi Army out of Basra. The assault was planned by General Mohan Furaiji and approved by Iraqi Prime Minister Nouri al-Maliki. In April 2008, following the failure to disarm militant groups, both Major-General Abdul Jalil Khalaf and General Mohan Furaiji were removed from their positions in Basra.

Jith Al-nakhla Stadium where the 25th Arabian Gulf Cup was hosted

Workers in Basra's oil industry have been involved in extensive organization and labour conflict. They held a two-day strike in August 2003, and formed the nucleus of the independent General Union of Oil Employees (GUOE) in June 2004. The union held a one-day strike in July 2005, and publicly opposes plans for privatizing the industry.

Basra was scheduled to host the 22nd Arabian Gulf Cup tournament in Basra Sports City, a newly built multi-use sports complex. The tournament was shifted to Riyadh, Saudi Arabia, after concerns over preparations and security. Iraq was also due to host the 2013 tournament, but that was moved to Bahrain. At least 10 demonstrators died as they protested against the lack of clean drinking water and electrical power in the city during the height of summer in 2018. Some protesters stormed the Iranian consulate in the city. In 2023, the city hosted the long scheduled 25th Arabian Gulf Cup where the Iraqi team won.

== Geography ==
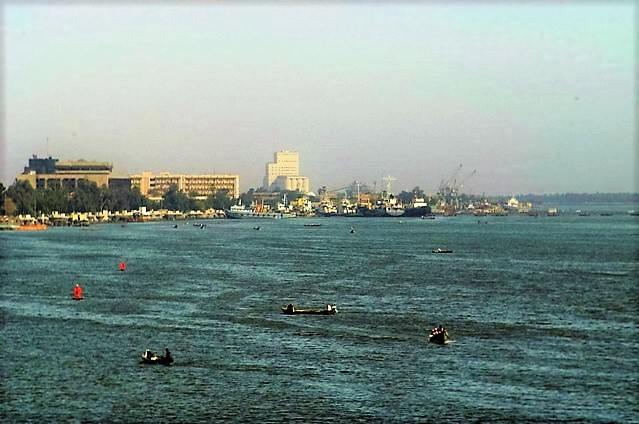
Shatt al-Arab near Basra

Basra is located on the Shatt-Al-Arab waterway, downstream of which is the Persian Gulf. The Shatt-Al-Arab and Basra waterways define the eastern and western borders of Basra, respectively. It is located near to the borders of Iran and Kuwait.

The city is penetrated by a complex network of canals and streams, vital for irrigation and other agricultural use. These canals were once used to transport goods and people throughout the city, but during the last two decades, pollution and a continuous drop in water levels have made river navigation impossible in the canals. Basra is roughly 110 km (68 mi) from the Persian Gulf. The city is located along the Shatt al-Arab waterway, 55 kilometers (34 mi) from the Persian Gulf and 545 kilometers (339 mi) from Baghdad, Iraq's capital and largest city.

=== Climate ===
Basra has a hot desert climate (Köppen climate classification BWh), like the rest of the surrounding region, though it receives slightly more precipitation than inland locations due to its location near the coast. During the summer months, from May to September, Basra is consistently one of the hottest cities on the planet, with temperatures regularly exceeding 50 °C (122 °F) between July and August. In winter Basra experiences mild and somewhat moist conditions with average high temperatures around 20 °C (68 °F). On some winter nights, minimum temperatures are below 0 °C (32 °F). High humidity – sometimes exceeding 90% – is common due to the proximity to the marshy Persian Gulf.

An all-time high temperature was recorded on 22 July 2016, when daytime readings soared to 53.9 °C (129.0 °F), which is the highest temperature that has ever been recorded in Iraq. This is one of the hottest temperatures ever measured on the planet. The following night, the night time low temperature was 38.8 °C (101.8 °F), which was one of the highest minimum temperatures on any given day, only outshone by Khasab, Oman, Dehloran, Iran and Death Valley, United States. The lowest temperature ever recorded in Basra was −4.7 °C (23.5 °F) on 22 January 1964.

Climate data for Basra (1991-2020)
Month	Jan	Feb	Mar	Apr	May	Jun	Jul	Aug	Sep	Oct	Nov	Dec	Year
Record high °C (°F)	34.0 (93.2)	39.0 (102.2)	42.6 (108.7)	46.1 (115.0)	50.0 (122.0)	51.6 (124.9)	53.9 (129.0)	52.6 (126.7)	50.7 (123.3)	46.8 (116.2)	39.7 (103.5)	31.2 (88.2)	53.9 (129.0)
Mean daily maximum °C (°F)	18.7 (65.7)	21.7 (71.1)	26.8 (80.2)	33.4 (92.1)	40.3 (104.5)	45.0 (113.0)	47.0 (116.6)	47.2 (117.0)	43.3 (109.9)	37.2 (99.0)	27.0 (80.6)	20.5 (68.9)	34.0 (93.2)
Daily mean °C (°F)	13.0 (55.4)	15.5 (59.9)	20.2 (68.4)	26.6 (79.9)	33.3 (91.9)	37.4 (99.3)	38.9 (102.0)	38.5 (101.3)	34.7 (94.5)	28.8 (83.8)	20.0 (68.0)	14.4 (57.9)	26.8 (80.2)
Mean daily minimum °C (°F)	8.3 (46.9)	10.1 (50.2)	14.3 (57.7)	20.1 (68.2)	26.2 (79.2)	29.1 (84.4)	30.7 (87.3)	29.9 (85.8)	26.3 (79.3)	21.7 (71.1)	14.4 (57.9)	9.6 (49.3)	20.1 (68.1)
Record low °C (°F)	−4.7 (23.5)	−4.0 (24.8)	1.9 (35.4)	2.8 (37.0)	8.2 (46.8)	18.2 (64.8)	22.2 (72.0)	20.0 (68.0)	13.1 (55.6)	6.1 (43.0)	1.0 (33.8)	−2.6 (27.3)	−4.7 (23.5)
Average precipitation mm (inches)	26.9 (1.06)	17.7 (0.70)	18.5 (0.73)	12.8 (0.50)	4.0 (0.16)	0 (0)	0 (0)	0 (0)	0 (0)	6.6 (0.26)	19.1 (0.75)	25.2 (0.99)	130.8 (5.15)
Average precipitation days (≥ 1.0 mm)	4.8	3.7	3.2	2.4	0.9	0.1	0	0	0	0.5	2.2	4.1	21.9
Average relative humidity (%)	66.3	56.8	47.0	38.6	26.8	20.5	21.8	23.6	27.2	38.5	53.8	66.1	40.6
Mean monthly sunshine hours	186.0	197.8	217.0	243.0	297.6	345.6	347.2	353.4	318.0	279.0	219.0	182.9	3,506.5
Mean daily sunshine hours	6	7	7	8	9	11	11	10	10	9	7	6	8
Percentage possible sunshine	58	64	59	63	71	83	82	87	87	80	70	59	80
Average ultraviolet index	4	5	7	10	11	12	12	11	9	7	4	3	8
Source 1: WMO, Climate-Data.org, DWD (precipitation days)
Source 2: Iraqi Meteorological Organization for sunshine Ogimet Meteomanz and Weather Atlas (uv index)

=== Effect of climate change ===
The city of Basra was once well known for its agriculture, but that has since altered due to rising temperatures, increased water salinity, and desertification.

== Demographics ==
Basra Metropolitan Region comprises three towns—Basra city proper, Al-ʿAshar, and Al-Maʿqil—and several villages. In Basra the vast majority of the population are ethnic Arabs of the Adnanite or the Qahtanite tribes. The tribes located in Basra include Bani Malik, Al-shwelat, Suwa'id, Al-bo Mohammed, Al-Badr, Al-Ubadi, Ruba'ah Sayyid tribes and other Marsh Arabs tribes.

There are also Feyli Kurds living in the eastern side of the city, they are mainly merchants. In addition to the Arabs, there is also a community of Afro-Iraqi peoples, known as Zanj. The Zanj are an African Muslim ethnic group living in Iraq and are a mix of African peoples taken from the coast of the area of modern-day Kenya and Tanzania as slaves in the 900s. They number around 1,500,000–2,000,000 in Iraq.

=== Religion ===
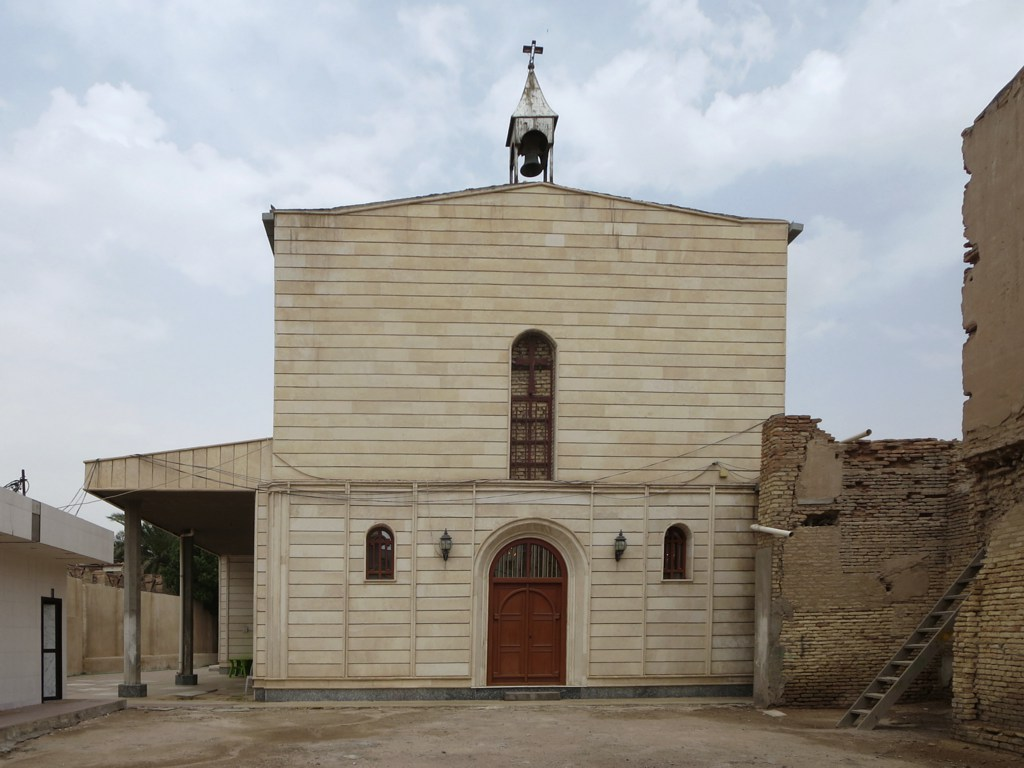
The Armenian Church in Basra

Basra is a major Shia city, with the old Akhbari Shiism progressively being overwhelmed by the Usuli Shiism. It is known as the "Cradle of Islamic Culture". The Sunni Muslim population is small and dropping in their percentage as more Iraqi Shias move into Basra for various job or welfare opportunities. The satellite town of Az Zubayr in the direction of Kuwait was a Sunni majority town, but the burgeoning population of Basra has spilled over into Zubair, turning it into an extension of Basra with a slight Shia majority as well.

Assyrians were recorded in the Ottoman census as early as 1911, and a small number of them live in Basra. However, a significant number of the modern community are refugees fleeing persecution from ISIS in the Nineveh Plains, Mosul, and northern Iraq. But ever since the victory of Iraq against the ISIS in 2017, many Christians have returned to their homeland in the Nineveh plains. In 2018 there are about a few thousand Christians in Basra. The Armenian Church in Basra, dates from 1736 but has been rebuilt three times. The portrait of the Virgin Mary in the church was brought from India in 1882.

One of the largest communities of pre-Islamic Mandaeans live in the city, whose headquarters was in the area formerly called Suk esh-Sheikh. Basra is home to second highest concentration of the Mandaean community, after Baghdad. As of recent estimates 350 Mandaean families are found in the city. Dair al-Yahya is one of the most important Mandaean temples, located in Basra. The temple is dedicated to John the Baptist, the chief prophet in Mandaeism, who also reverred by the Jews, Christians and Muslims.

The city was also home to one of the oldest Jewish communities. During the 1930s, the Jews constituted 9.8% of the total population. However, most of them fled after a series of persecution, which began in 1941 and lasted till 1951. Between 1968 and 2003, fewer than 300 Jews remained in the city. After the 2003 invasion of Iraq, most of them emigrated to abroad. The Tweig Synagogue in Basra, is currently abandoned.

=== Genetics ===
Two genetic studies conducted by researchers at the University of Basrah have explored the paternal and maternal genetic diversity of the local population. A 2022 study analyzing Y-chromosome STR markers among 191 unrelated males found that the five most frequent Y-DNA haplogroups in Basra were R1b (20.5%), J2 (18.0%), E1b (15.5%), G2 (11.3%), and J1 (10.8%), lineages commonly found among the various ethnic groups of Iraq. A 2020 study of Mitochondrial DNA (mtDNA) variation in 164 Basra women reported the most common haplogroups as H (17%), J (11%), U (9%), M (9%), and K (5%), with 19% classified as “Other”. These results reflect a complex population history, with paternal lineages showing strong affinities to ancient Mesopotamian ancestry, while maternal lineages also include a substantial proportion of native Mesopotamian haplogroups alongside broader genetic diversity linked to Basra’s historical role as a regional trade hub.

== Urban Landscape ==
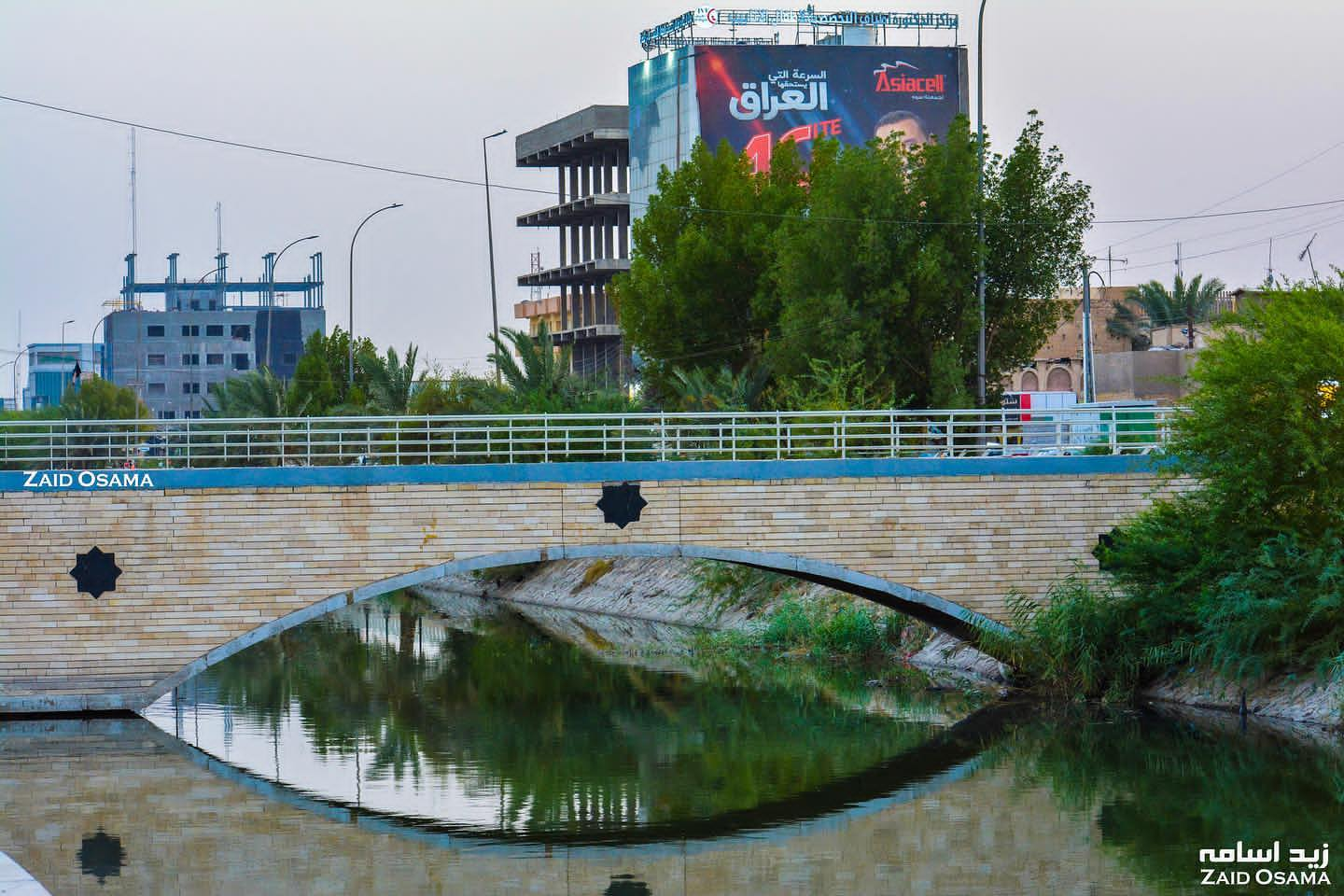
Bridges on Basra

The Old Mosque of Basra is the first mosque in Islam outside the Arabian peninsula. Sinbad Island is located in the centre of Shatt Al-Arab, near the Miinaalmakl, and extends above the Bridge Khaled and is a tourist landmark. The Muhhmad Baquir Al-Sadr Bridge, at the union of the Tigris and Euphrates Rivers, was completed in 2017. Sayab's House Ruins is the site of the most famous home of the poet Badr Shakir al-Sayyab. There is also a statue of Sayab, one of the statues in Basra done by the artist and sculptor Nada' Kadhum, located on al-Basrah Corniche; it was unveiled in 1972.

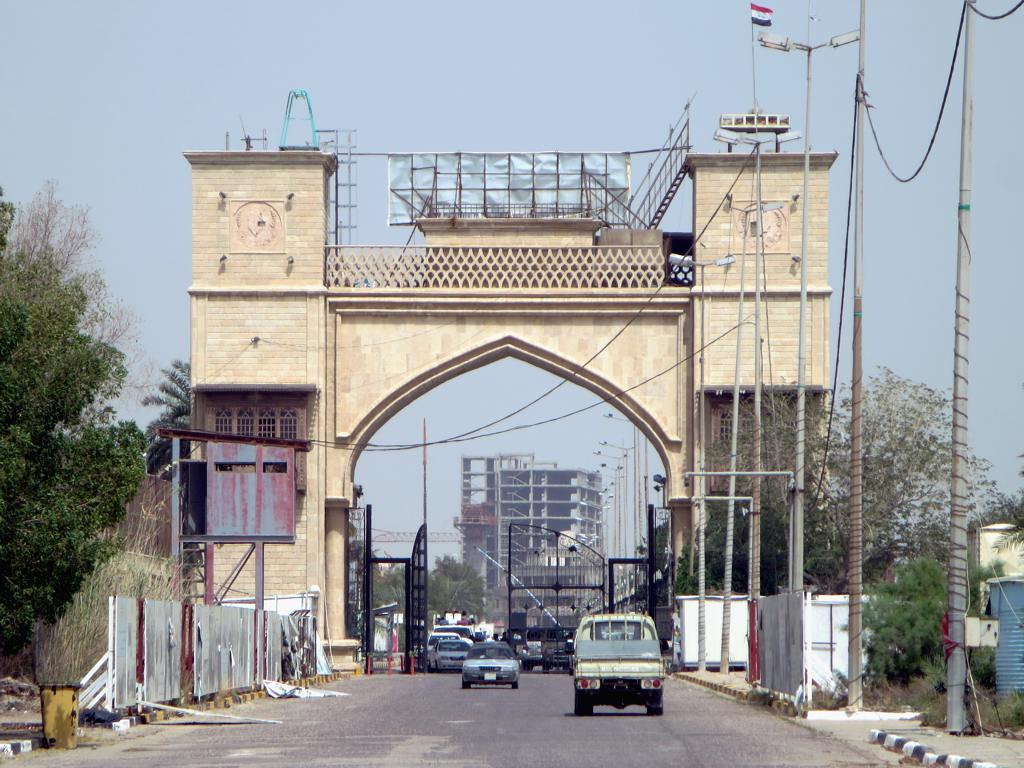
Entrance to Palace

Basra Sports City is the largest sport city in the Middle East, located on the Shatt al-Basra. Palm tree forests are largely located on the shores of Shatt-al Arab waterway, especially in the nearby village of Abu Al-Khasib. Corniche al-Basra is a street which runs on the shore of the Shatt al-Arab; it goes from the Lion of Babylon Square to the Four Palaces. Basra International Hotel (formally known as Basra Sheraton Hotel) is located on the Corniche street. The first five star hotel in the city, it is notable for its Shanasheel style exterior design. The hotel was heavily looted during the Iraq War, and it has been renovated recently.

Sayyed Ali al-Musawi Mosque, also known as the Mosque of the Children of Amer, is located in the city centre, on Al-Gazear Street, and it was built for Shia Imami's leader Sayyed Ali al-Moussawi, whose followers lived in Iraq and neighbouring countries. The Fun City of Basra, which is now called Basra Land, is one of the oldest theme-park entertainment cities in the south of the country, and the largest involving a large number of games giants. It was damaged during the war, and has been rebuilt. Akhora Park is one of the city's older parks. It is located on al-Basra Street.

There are four formal presidential palaces in Basra, built by Saddam Hussein. One of them has been converted into the Basrah Museum. The Latin Church is located on 14 July Street. Indian Market (Amogaiz) is one of the main bazaars in the city. It is called the Indian Market, since it had Indian vendors working there at the beginning of the last century. Hanna-Sheikh Bazaar is an old market; it was established by the powerful and famous Hanna-Sheikh family.

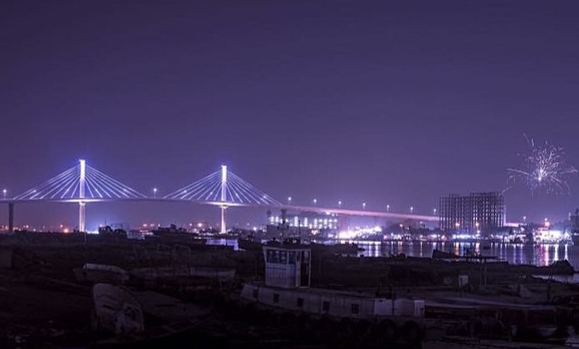
Muhhmad Baquir Al-Sadr Bridge

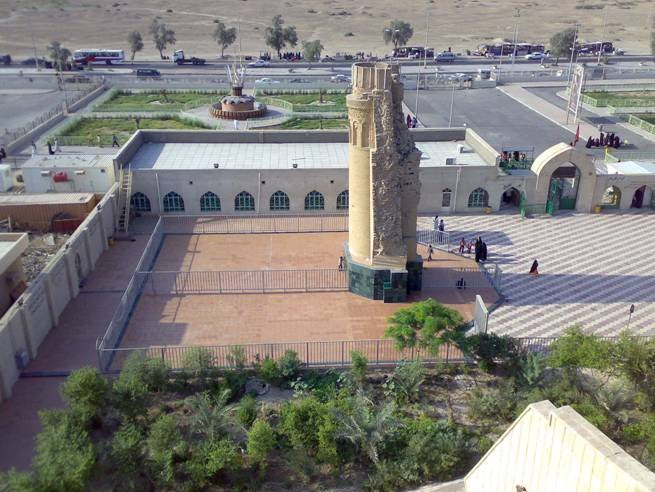
Ali Bin Abi Talib mosque

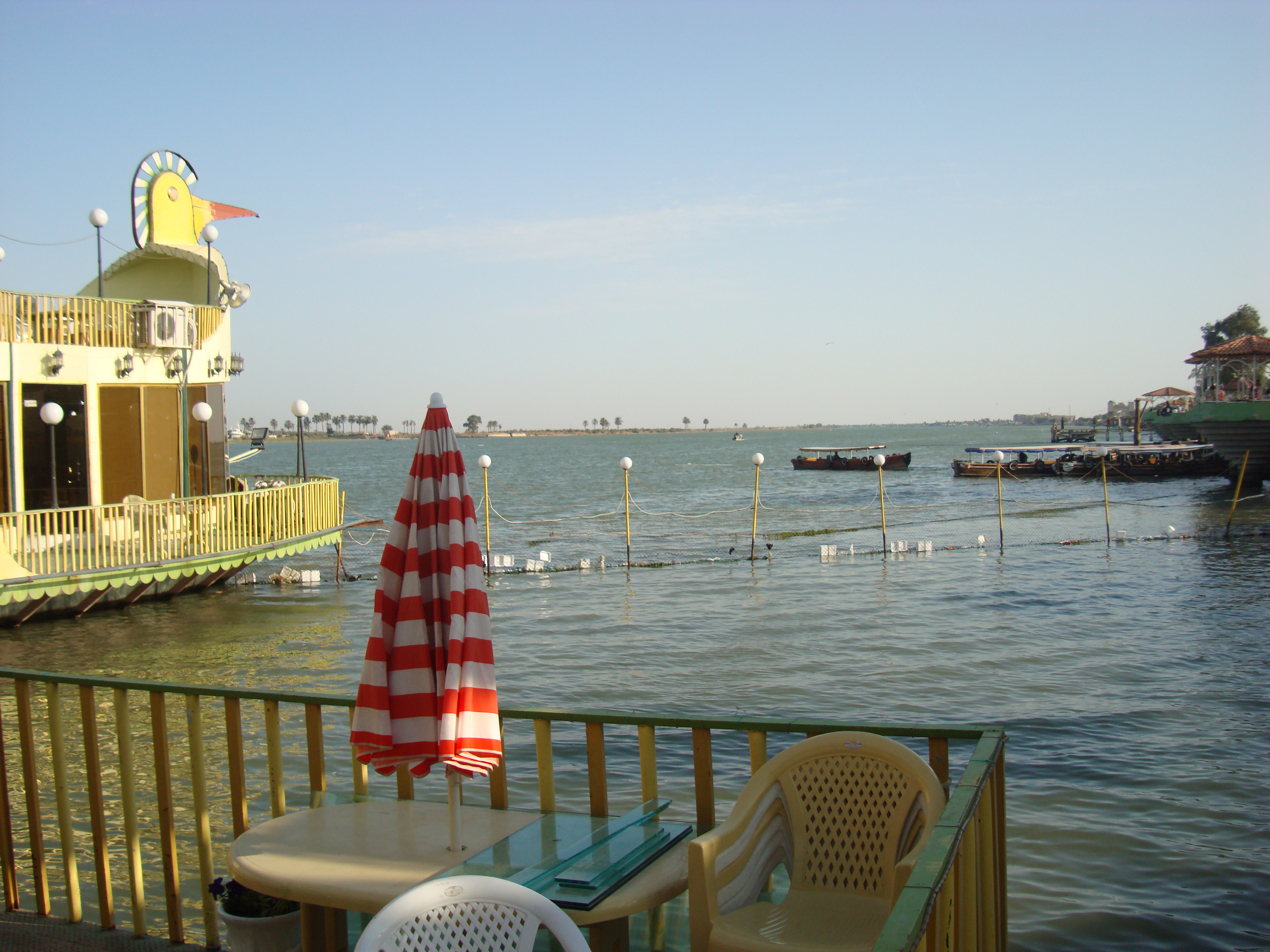
Shatt Al-Arab

== Economy ==
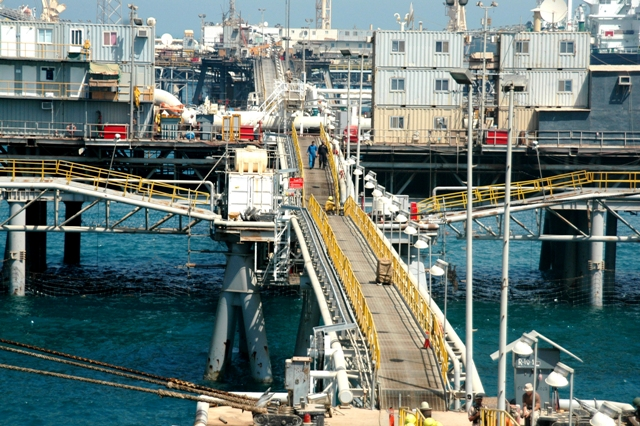
Al Basrah Oil Terminal.

Basra is known as "Iraq's economic and industrial capital". Its strategic location has made the city an important hub of trade and commerce. Basra's economy is largely dependent on the oil and heavy industry. In the early 1970s, Basra was chosen as a nodal point for Iraq's development. A number of projects were launched during this period, such as oil refineries and chemical plants. In April 2017, the Iraqi Parliament recognized Basra as Iraq's economic capital.

Iraq has the world's 4th largest oil reserves, estimated to be more 115 billion barrels (18.3×10^{9} m^{3}). Some of Iraq's largest oil fields are located in the province, and most of Iraq's oil exports leave from Al Basrah Oil Terminal. The Basra Oil Company, formerly the South Oil Company, has its headquarters in the city. Basra has emerged as an important commercial and industrial center for the country, as the city is home to a large number of manufacturing industries ranging from petrochemical to water treatment.

Substantial economic activity in Basra is centred around the petrochemical industry, which includes the Southern Fertilizer Company and The State Company for Petrochemical Industries (SCPI). The Southern Fertilizer Company produces ammonia solution, urea and nitrogen gas, while the SCPI focus on such products as ethylene, caustic/chlorine, vinyl chloride monomer (VCM), polyvinyl chloride (PVC), low-density polyethylene, and high-density polyethylene.

Basra is in a fertile agricultural region, with major products including rice, maize corn, barley, pearl millet, wheat, dates, and livestock. For a long time, Basra was known for the superior quality of its dates. Basra was known in the 1960s for its sugar market, a fact that figured heavily in the English contract law remoteness of damages case The Heron II [1969] 1 AC 350. Fishing was an important business before the oil boom.

== Transport ==
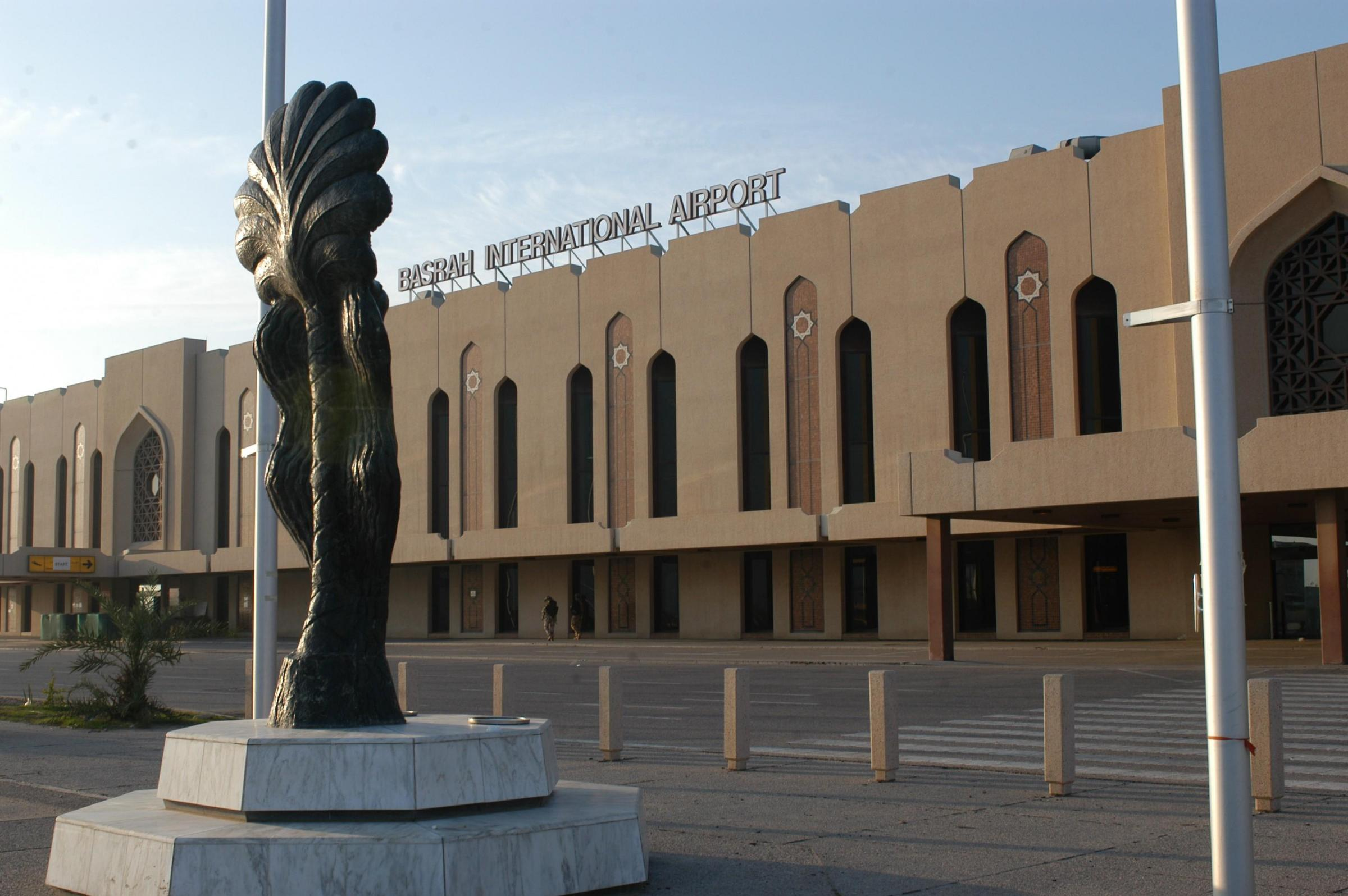
Basra International Airport

Shipping, logistics and transport are also major industries in Basra. Basra is home to all of Iraq's six ports; Umm Qasr is the main deep-water port with 22 platforms, some of which are dedicated to specific goods (such as sulphur, seeds, lubricant oil, etc.) The other five ports are smaller in scale and more narrowly specialized. The city also has an international airport, with service into Baghdad with Iraqi Airways—the national airline, as well as international flights on several internationally top-ranked Middle Eastern airline companies.

The Iraqi Republic Railways operates passenger services on the IRR Southern Line (also known as the Baghdad–Basra Railway) between Baghdad Central Station and Basra Al Maqal railway station.

=== Seaport ===
Basra is Iraq's main port, although it does not have deep water access, which is handled at the port of Umm Qasr. However, construction of the Grand Faw Port on the southeastern coast of Basra Governorate, which is considered a national project for Iraq, is expected to strengthen Iraq's geopolitical position by giving the country the largest port in the Middle East and one of the largest in the world. Furthermore, Iraq is planning to establish a large naval base in the Faw peninsula.

== Sports ==
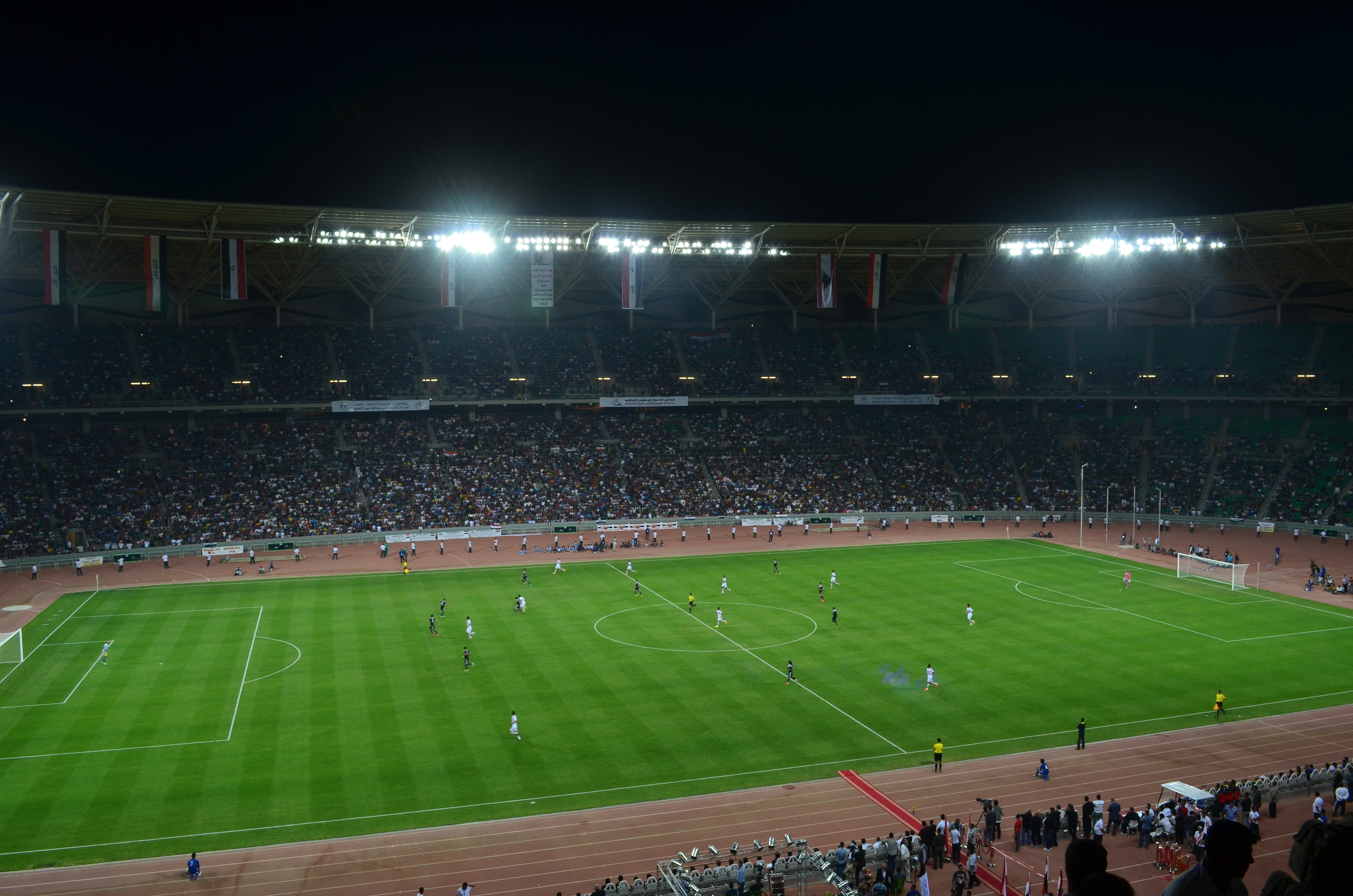
Basra International Stadium in 2013

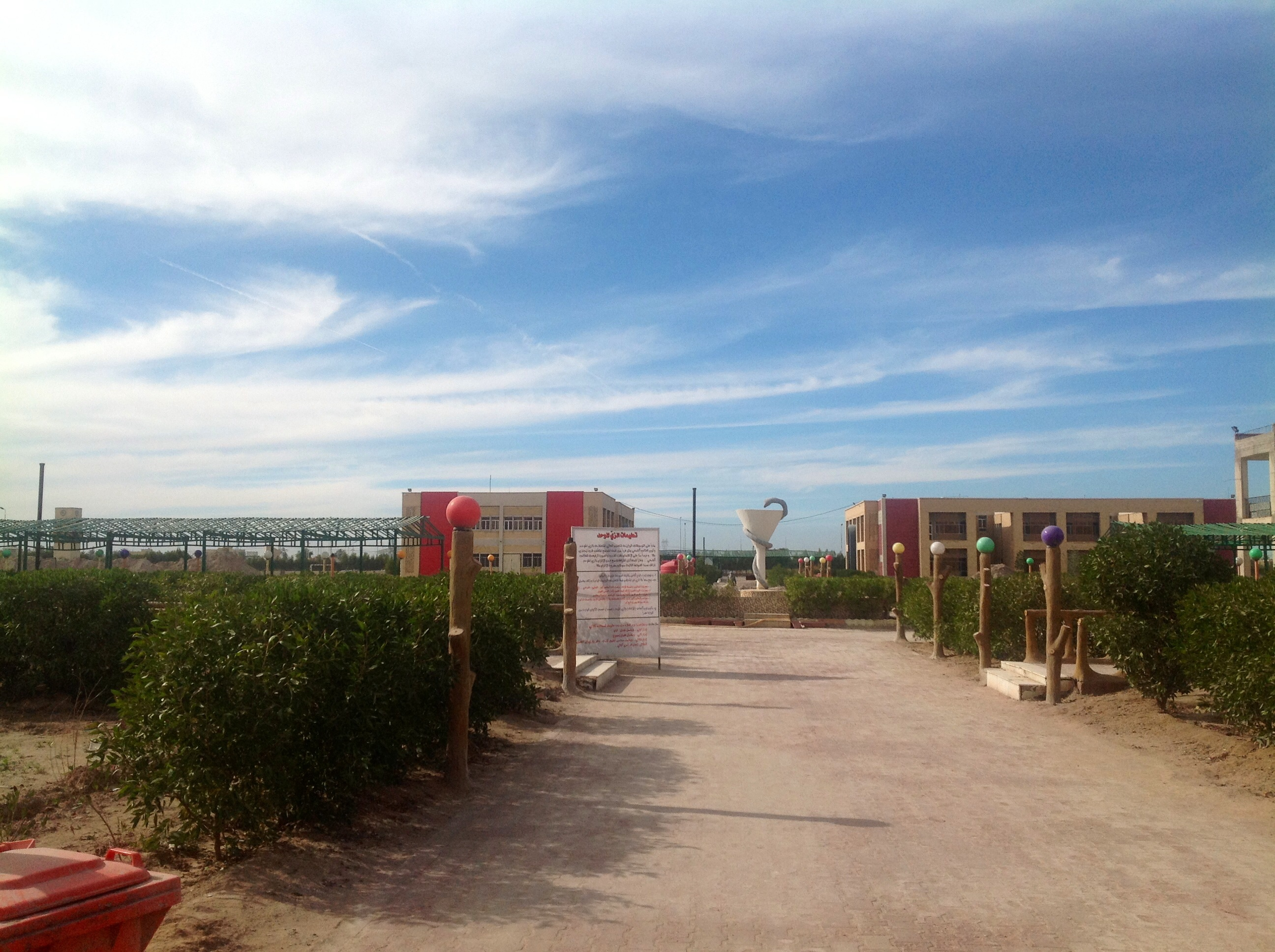
The College of Pharmacy, University of Basra

The city is home to the largest sports stadium in Iraq, the Basra International Stadium, which hosts several matches of the Iraq national football team. The city is also home to sports team Al-Minaa, that uses Al-Minaa Olympic Stadium as its home venue. Its basketball division is among the elite Arab teams that compete at the Arab Club Basketball Championship.

== Notable people ==
- Rabi'a al-'Adawiyya, known as Rabia of Basra, early Muslim mystic
- Ibn al-Haytham, a medieval mathematician, astronomer, and physicist.
- Saadi Youssef, poet from Basra
- Sean Polley, English cricketer, 1981 born in Basra
- Reham Yacoub, female activist
- Farid Allawerdi, composer
- Hussein Jabur, footballer
- Rahma Riad, singer and actress

== Twin towns and sister cities ==
Basra is twinned with:

- Houston, Texas, United States
- Nishapur, Iran
- Baku, Azerbaijan
- Aqaba, Jordan

== In fiction ==
- In Voltaire's Zadig "Bassora" is the site of an international market where the hero meets representatives of all the world religions and concludes that "the world is one large family which meets at Bassora."
- The city of Basra has a major role in H. G. Wells's 1933 future history The Shape of Things to Come, where the "Modern State" is at the centre of a world state emerging after a collapse of civilization, and becomes in effect the capital of the world.
- In the 1940 film The Thief of Bagdad, Ahmad and Abu flee to the city from Bagdad. Ahmad falls in love with the sultan's beautiful daughter, who is also desired by his enemy, and former Grand Vizier, Jaffar.
- In Scott K. Andrews' "Operation Motherland", the second book in the post-apocalyptic "Afterblight Chronicles", the character Lee Keegan crash lands his plane in the streets of Basra during the opening chapter.
- In Prince of Persia 2: The Shadow and the Flame, the protagonist travels to a city called Basra in a flying carpet, explores its ruins, and finds a throne room where he receives a vision that he is of royal lineage and is the only survivor of a massacre in the area after his parents sacrificed their lives to save him.

== See also ==
- List of largest cities of Iraq
- Afro Iraqis
- Basra International Airport
- Dua Kumayl
- Basra reed warbler
- University of Basrah
- Umm Qasr Port

== Bibliography ==
- Floor, Willem M. (2008). Titles and Emoluments in Safavid Iran: A Third Manual of Safavid Administration, by Mirza Naqi Nasiri. Washington, DC: Mage Publishers. ISBN 978-1933823232.
- Hallaq, Wael. The Origins and Evolution of Islamic Law. Cambridge University Press, 2005
- Hawting, Gerald R. The First Dynasty of Islam. Routledge. 2nd ed, 2000
- Longrigg, Steven Helmsley; Lang, Katherine H. (2015). "Basra from the Mongol conquest to modern period". In Fleet, Kate; Krämer, Gudrun; Matringe, Denis; Nawas, John; Rowson, Everett (eds.). Encyclopaedia of Islam (3rd ed.). Brill Online. doi:10.1163/1573-3912_ei3_COM_23813. ISSN 1873-9830.
- Madelung, Wilferd. "Abd Allah b. al-Zubayr and the Mahdi" in the Journal of Near Eastern Studies 40. 1981. pp. 291–305.
- Matthee, Rudi (2006a). "Between Arabs, Turks and Iranians: The Town of Basra, 1600-1700". Bulletin of the School of Oriental and African Studies, University of London. 69 (1): 53–78. doi:10.1017/S0041977X06000036. JSTOR 20181989. S2CID 159935186.
- Matthee, Rudi (2006b). "IRAQ iv. RELATIONS IN THE SAFAVID PERIOD". Encyclopaedia Iranica (Vol. XIII, Fasc. 5 and Vol. XIII, Fasc. 6). pp. 556–560, 561.
- Tillier, Mathieu. Les cadis d'Iraq et l'Etat abbasside (132/750-334/945). Institut Français du Proche-Orient, 2009
- Vincent, Stephen. Into The Red Zone: A Journey into the Soul of Iraq. ISBN 1-890626-57-0.
