= Imam Ali Mosque (Basra) =

First Islamic mosque outside Mecca and Medina

- جَامِع خَطْوَة الْإِمَام عَلِيّ
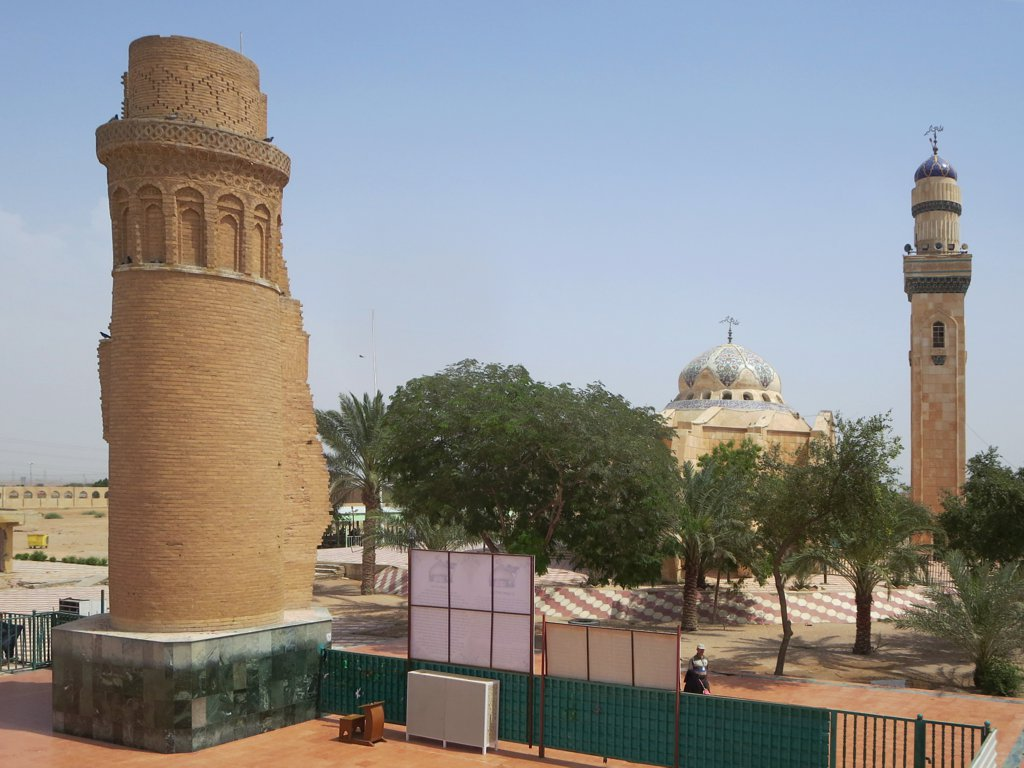
- The rebuilt mosque in the background, with the 7th-century mosque remnants in the foreground, in 2016

- Location of the mosque in Iraq

Religion
- Affiliation: Shia Islam
- Rite: sometimes Sunni
- Ecclesiastical or organizational status: Congregational mosque; Shrine
- Status: Active

Location
- Location: Basra, Basra Governorate
- Country: Iraq
- Interactive map of Imam Ali Mosque
- Coordinates: 30°23′59″N 47°44′02″E

Architecture
- Type: Islamic architecture
- Completed: c. 635 CE (remnants); 2000 CE (restoration)

Specifications
- Dome: One
- Minaret: One
- Shrine: One
- Materials: Cane (initial); mud bricks; sandstone

The Imam Ali Mosque (Arabic: جَامِع خَطْوَة الْإِمَام عَلِيّ), also known as the Old Mosque of Basra (مَسْجِد الْبَصْرَة الْقَدِيم) and as the Jami Khatwa ʿAli (جامع خطوة الإمام علي), is the first mosque that was built in the historical setting of Basra (located 12 kilometres (7.5 mi) west of the current city center), in the Basra Governorate of Iraq. Completed in c. 635 CE, it is among the oldest mosques in the history of Islam; reputedly, the third Islamic mosque built, and the first mosque outside Mecca and Medina. Remnants of this 7th-century structure remain, whilst a new structure was completed in 2000.

Predominately Shi'ite, the congregational mosque is sometimes used by Sunni Muslims.

== History ==
=== Establishment and significance ===
The mosque was founded c. 635 CE during the era of the second Caliph Umar, on the outskirts of Basra right before the conquest of the city. Initially, the building was built from palm canes, but the original building was later burnt down by the great fire. Later the mosque was reconstructed from the mud during the era of the 3rd Umayyad Caliph Umar II.

The reconstructed building, however, was destroyed again during the Abbasid era due to the great flood which submerged the city of Basra. After the majority of the Basra citizens evacuated from the old Basra to the newer part of the city, the mosque became a cultural heritage and a site for the pilgrimage to Ali and Aisha. Due to the religious importance of the mosque, the site became a location of many massacres of Arab pilgrims, especially during the Zanj Rebellion.

It is considered that the first madrasa for fiqh studies, hadith studies, and philosophy was established within the mosque. Some important figures of early Islamic history were educated here, including Abd Allah ibn Abbas and Wasil ibn Ata. The madrasa was among the first to call the adoption of mind as a way to devise legal problems.

=== Present day ===
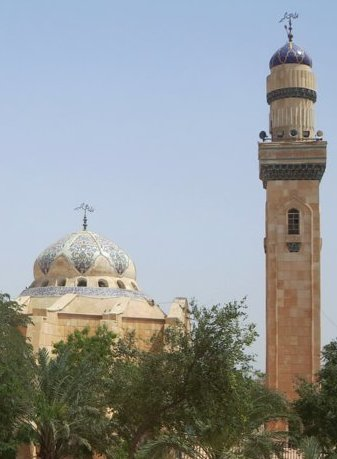
The mosque in its current form.

In 2000, the mosque was restored and rebuilt in its current form. The new construction lacked the connection to the previous architectural style.

In the early 2010s, there were plans to expand the mosque to cover an area of 200 dunums and rebuild it to look like its original form with the addition of six minarets, sixteen doors, and a large courtyard for prayer. However, the plans stalled in 2013 due to the terrible conditions Iraq was suffering through at the time.

In recent years, the mosque witnessed celebrations and gatherings during the days of Ramadan. These include activities like Qur’an reading competitions and organizing Islamic lectures. Reciters from as far as al-Azhar University from Cairo, Egypt, visit the mosque and its gatherings to participate in commemorating Ramadan nights by reading the Qur’an, as well as commemorating religious occasions. According to Ali al-Baghdadi, the mosque custodian, the gatherings include people from all over Iraqi cities, and the Arabian peninsula, in addition to visitors and tourists from Iran, Pakistan, and India. The mosque's significant age as the first madrasa for fiqh studies, as well as the belief that the mosque was visited by Ali and Aisha after the Battle of the Camel, helped in holding its role as a visitor site.

== Architecture ==
The site contains the remnants of the 7th-century mosque, that includes a corner tower, often misinterpreted as a minaret. This tower was restored during the 1980s. Based on the decorative brickwork, the tower was dated to the same period as the Mustansariyya Madrassa in Baghdad, that was built in 624 CE. Aside from the tower, other remnants include a series of composite sandstone columns. Each column section consists of a thick round disc with a central hole, presumably for central reinforcing rods to tie the columns together.

Today, the site contains a small modern mosque and shrine.

== See also ==
- Islam in Iraq
- List of mosques in Iraq
- List of the oldest mosques in the world
