= Imam Ali Mosque (Shaki) =

Mosque in Sheki, Azerbaijan

- Azerbaijani: İmam Əli Məscidi; Persian: مسجد امام علی (شکی)
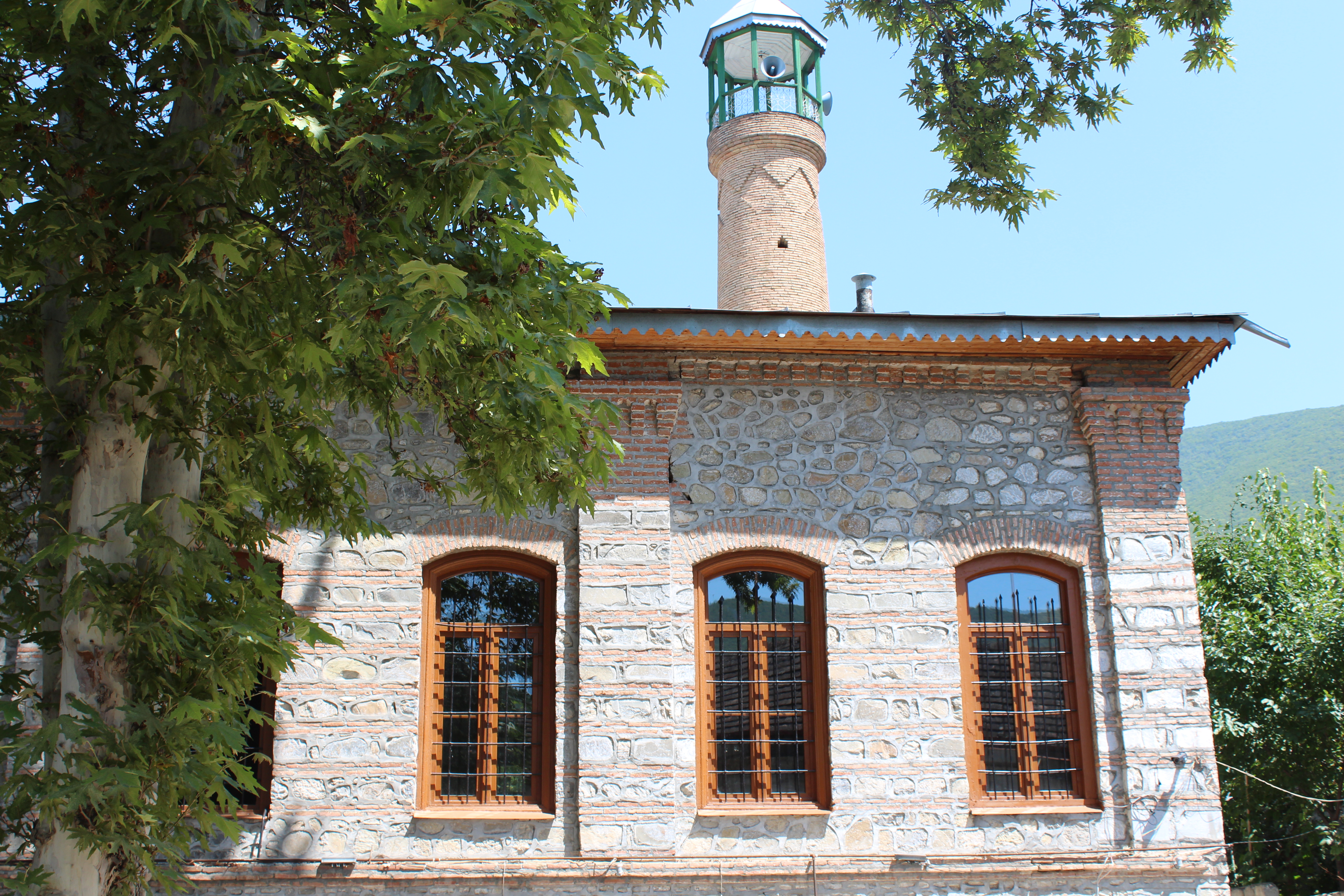
- The mosque in 2015

- Location of the mosque in Azerbaijan

Religion
- Affiliation: Islam
- Ecclesiastical or organizational status: Mosque (1775–1928); Profane use (1928–1992); Mosque (since 1997)
- Status: Active

Location
- Location: Shaki
- Country: Azerbaijan
- Interactive map of Imam Ali Mosque
- Coordinates: 41°12′05″N 47°11′38″E

Architecture
- Type: Mosque architecture
- Style: Islamic
- Completed: 1775

Specifications
- Length: 26 m (85 ft)
- Width: 13 m (43 ft)
- Interior area: 660 m^{2} (7,100 sq ft)
- Minaret: One
- Minaret height: 22 m (72 ft)
- Materials: Bricks

The Imam Ali Mosque (Azerbaijani: İmam Əli Məscidi; Persian: مسجد امام علی (شکی)) is a mosque located in the city of Sheki, Azerbaijan.

== Overview ==
The mosque was built in Sheki, in the Ganjali quarter. The exact date of the mosque's construction is unknown. The total area of the mosque is 660 m^{2} (7,100 sq ft). The mosque has a quadrangular shape and consists of two floors. There are auxiliary rooms on the ground floor. On the second floor, there is a prayer hall with an area of 26 m × 13 m (85 ft × 43 ft).

The mosque was built from burnt bricks. The walls are 75 cm (30 in) thick. The Imam Ali Mosque has retained its original appearance. However, after the Soviet occupation in Azerbaijan, during the years of repression, the minaret of the Imam Ali Mosque was destroyed and the mosque ceased to function. In 1997 the minaret and the altar were rebuilt. The height of the current minaret is 22 m (72 ft) and, like the mosque itself, it is made of burnt bricks.

== Gallery ==
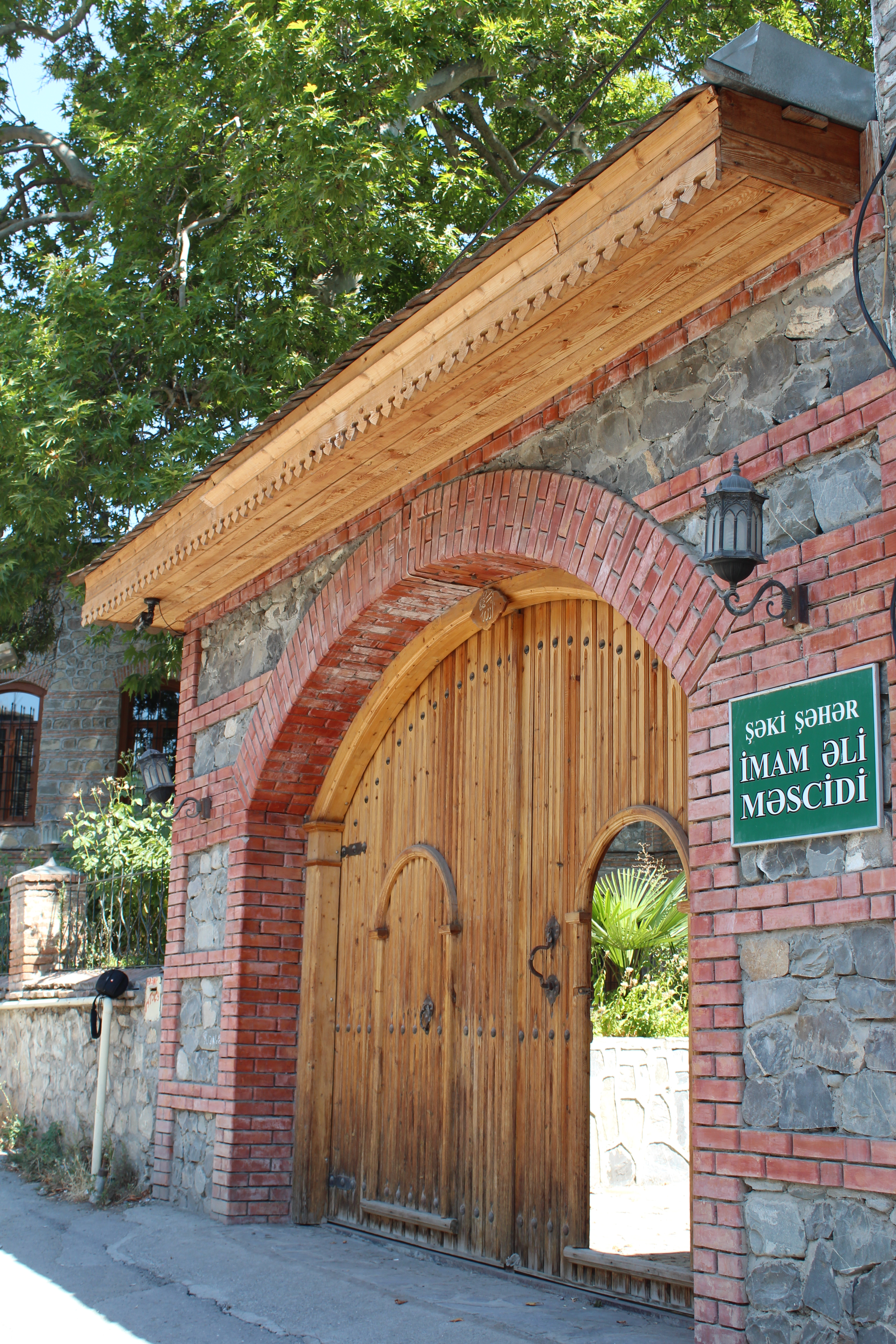

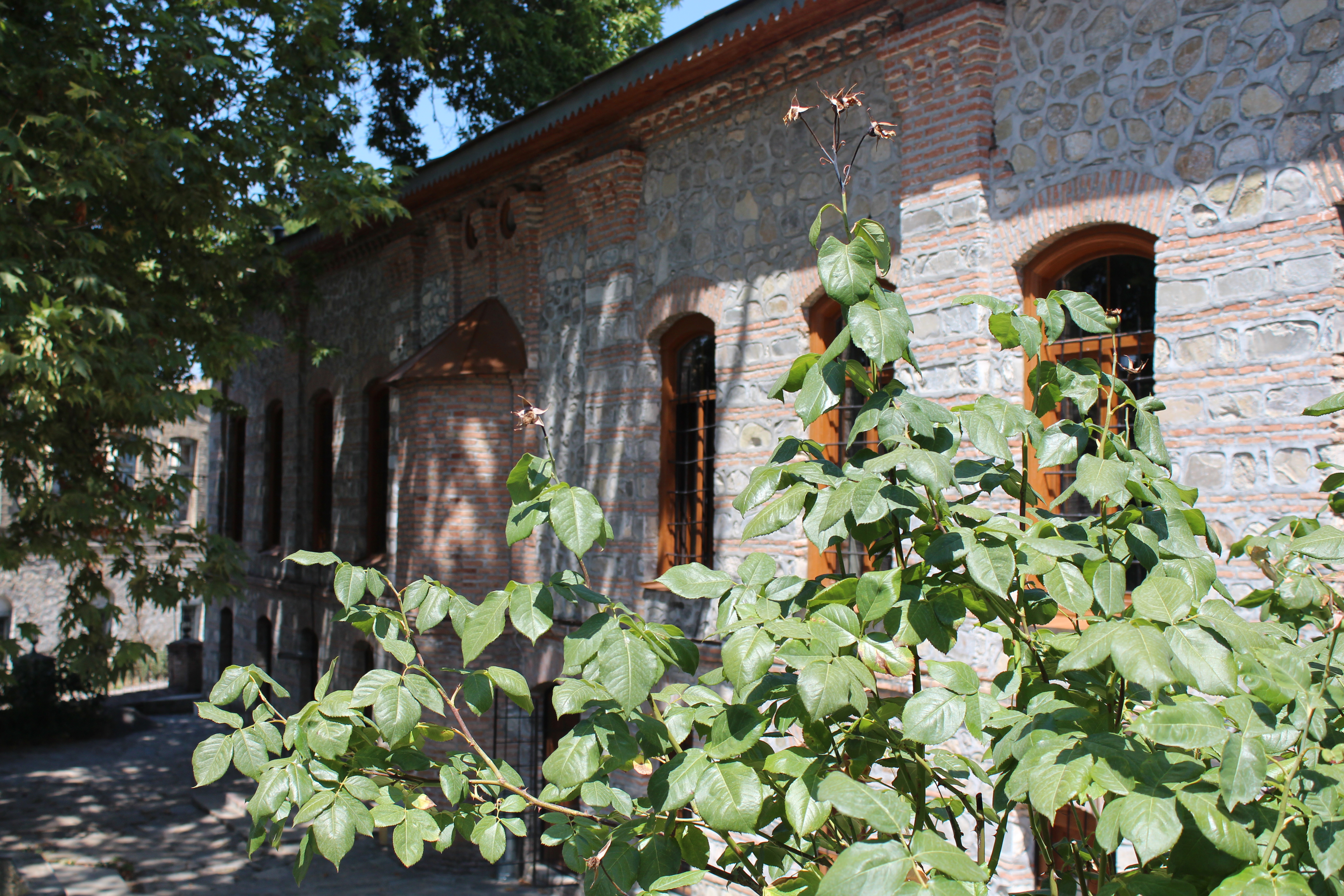

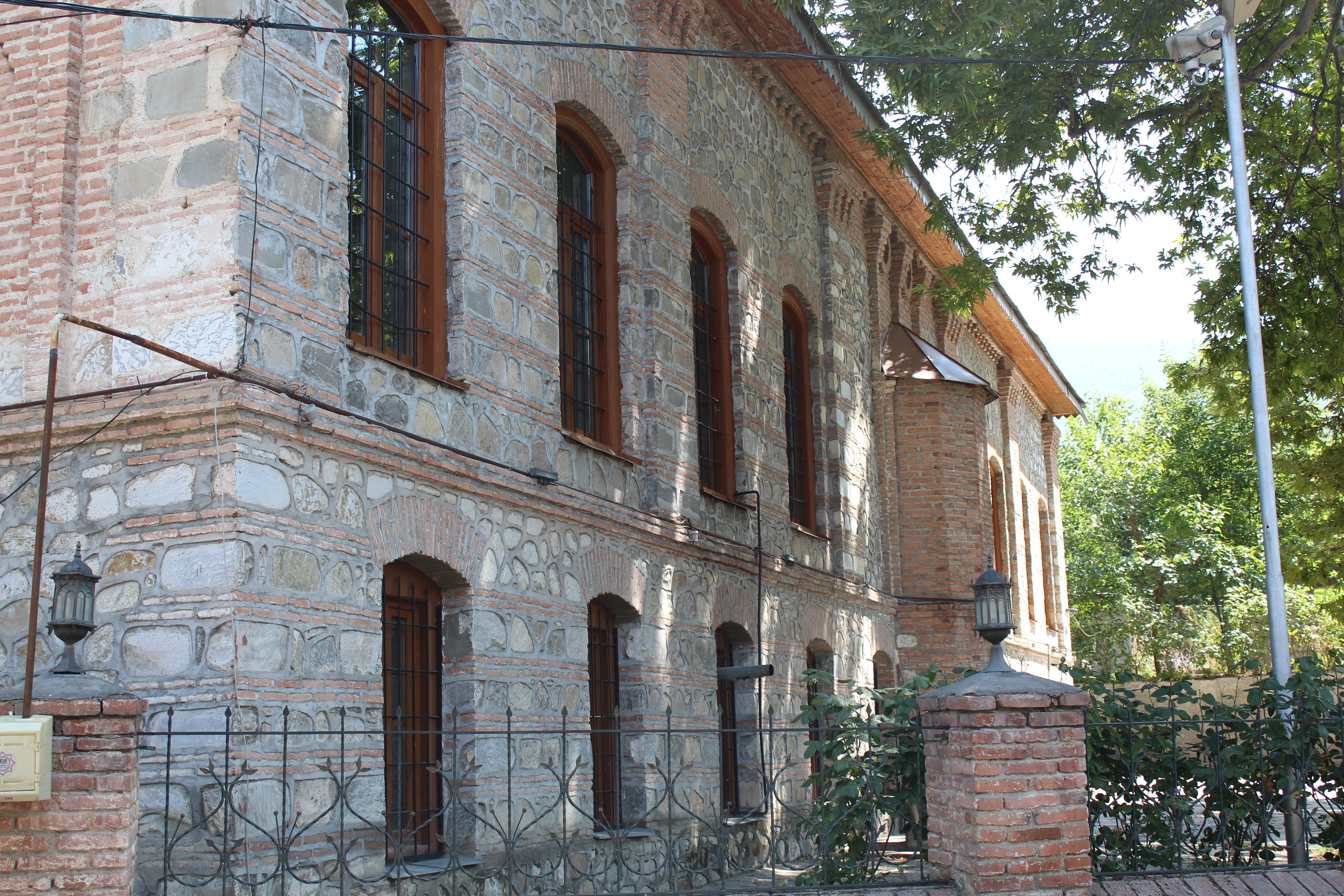

== See also ==
- Islam in Azerbaijan
- List of mosques in Azerbaijan
