= Widad Akrawi =

Iraqi Kurdish health expert and activist

Widad Akreyi ویداد ئاکرەیی
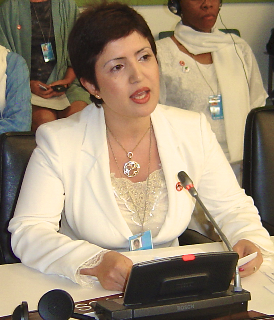
- Widad Akreyi addressing the UN, 2010
- Education: Genetics and inherited disease (M.A.); Global health and cancer epidemiology (PhD)
- Known for: Advocate for human rights, peace and justice, author, Arms Trade Treaty, UN Declaration of Commitment to End Sexual Violence in Conflict, UN Resolution 2117
- Awards: Pacem in Terris Award; Pfeffer Peace Prize; Davenport Mayor Medal; Woman Harmony Award; Woman of the Year 2020; Special Prize for bridging gap between cultures
- Website: widad.org

Widad Akreyi is a Kurdish health expert and human rights activist. She has co-founded the human rights organization Defend International and is the author of several books about both health issues and human rights.

Akreyi holds a master's degree in genetics and a PhD in international health and epidemiology. Violations of human rights that occurred during the Iraqi government offensive against the Kurds in 1974, as well as during the Al-Anfal Campaign are thought to have shaped her life.

She has been listed as one of the winners of the Fellowship of Reconciliation peace awards, where she was called "outspoken peace activist" and the "first young woman of Middle Eastern descent" to engage in advocacy relating to illicit trade of small arms and light weapons, gender-based violence, chemical and biological disarmament, conventional disarmament and international security.

In 2013, Akreyi was awarded the "Special Prize for bridging the gap between civilisations" by the National Organisation for Future Generations for making valuable contributions to humanity through the creation of a culture of coexistence. When she received the International Pfeffer Peace Award in 2014, she dedicated it to the residents of Kobane and Sinjar and the persecuted Christians in the Middle East. In 2017, she was presented with the Davenport mayor medal and the Pacem in Terris Award for "her selfless commitment to human rights for all." In 2018, she received the International Simply Woman Harmony Award for devoting her life to defending human rights, and in 2020 she was handpicked as a woman of the year 2020.

== Biography ==
Akreyi was born into a secular family in Kurdistan region, Iraq. In her early and her teenage years, she resisted every effort made by members of the Baath Party to induce her to gain her trust and become a member, which caused her to be blacklisted for a period of time.

In 1986, she moved to Erbil where she studied civil engineering with a focus on designing roads and bridges at the Salahaddin University. In 1988 she was secretly involved in documenting torture and other violations of human rights throughout Iraq. The following year, she became politically involved in various struggles for human rights, peace, social justice, democratic governance and ethnic reconciliation. Her advocacy of anti-authoritarianism and her criticism of the use of excessive force against civilians were not without risk and threat to her life and the lives of her family members. Her involvement in these issues became more intense after the Al-Anfal Campaign, also known as the Kurdish Genocide. Despite difficult times, she managed to complete her B.Sc. in 1990.

After the first Gulf War, when the Iraqi regime regained control of the Kurdistan region through an offensive in spring 1991, she was forced to leave her country.

In the diaspora, Akreyi earned a master's degree in genetics and genomics and a PhD degree in global health and cancer epidemiology. She has served as a clinical geneticist, researching inherited diseases.

Akreyi is the co-founder of Defend International, an NGO whose mission is "to respond to grave violations of human rights and of International Humanitarian Law, monitor the implementation of preventive measures that are designed to end impunity for the perpetrators of these crimes, conduct medical research that may either directly or indirectly improve the health standard of communities, and to promote peace and democracy through cultural relations and diplomacy."

== Dedication to human rights ==
Akreyi's passion for human rights started many years ago when she advocated for her classmates at her school. As she grew up, she helped to establish a secret working group against torture in Iraq, dedicated to collecting evidence of torture and other human rights abuses. In 1987, she was secretly interviewing the victims and their families. She raised awareness about the impacts of torture and other violations of human rights on civilians. In 1990, she was engaged in advocating for gender equality and women's empowerment in the Middle East and North Africa region. She then co-founded a regional Women's Working Group and organised programs to enhance women's participation in peace-building and post-conflict reconstruction.

=== Continuing activism ===
In the diaspora, Akreyi launched campaigns, wrote articles and spoke in panel discussions on human rights, international conventions and peace. In 2005, she was elected, among Arabic-speaking bloggers from around the world, as the MENA region's most prominent blogger. She was awarded the prestigious title of "Queen Blogger" for two years until she resigned. Her first involvement with Amnesty International was in 1994, when she started to do volunteer work. In March 2006, the International Secretariat of Amnesty International thanked her for her efforts in support of Amnesty's campaigns, especially her effective use of the internet as a tool for human rights education and mobilisation. In February 2006, she was appointed as "Stop Torture" ambassador for Amnesty International. She was elected in the executive committee of Amnesty International in April 2006.

In June 2006, Akreyi co-chaired the first regional conference on control arms held in Cairo and was part of a delegation of high-profile activists who met with policy-makers at the Egyptian Ministry of Foreign Affairs and the Egyptian Parliament. In June 2007, she quit Amnesty International and co-founded Defend International. Same year, she was elected as a co-chair of the Women's Working Group on MENA Region.

It is observed that Akreyi has created partner agreements with leading NGOs like the International Action Network on Small Arms, Cluster Munition Coalition and the Global Alliance for Clean Cookstoves. She has launched campaigns to defend the rights of writers, civil society activists, children (child/forced marriages), girls, women's rights defenders, students, professors, prisoners on death row and prisoners on hunger strikes. She has over 20 years of experiences in the areas of human rights, gender equality, women's empowerment, grassroots organising, intercultural communication, strategic planning, international security, peace and international conventions.

Widad Akreyi has worked for a strong and effective Arms Trade Treaty. Her research on MENA countries, lobbying, and advocacy helped bring about sweeping changes in the voting process in 2006, 2008 and 2013.

Akreyi has worked for a new Declaration of Commitment to End Sexual Violence in Conflict - a goal that was achieved in September 2013.

Akreyi has lobbied for the adoption of a resolution exclusively dedicated to illicit transfer, destabilising accumulation and misuse of small arms and light weapons around the world - a goal that was achieved in September 2013 by the adoption of Resolution 2117 (2013) Dedicated to Question of Small Arms and Light Weapons.

The momentum Dr. Akreyi created in favor of a UN resolution on a strong and an effective Arms Trade Treaty, her commitment to combat armed gender-based violence, and her successful lobbying for the adoption of the new UN Declaration of Commitment to End Sexual Violence in Conflict as well as the UN Resolution 2117 exclusively dedicated to illicit transfer, destabilizing accumulation and misuse of small arms and light weapons around the World are outstanding contributions to shifting the current culture of violence, and we are grateful for her work.

=== Pfeffer Peace Prize ===
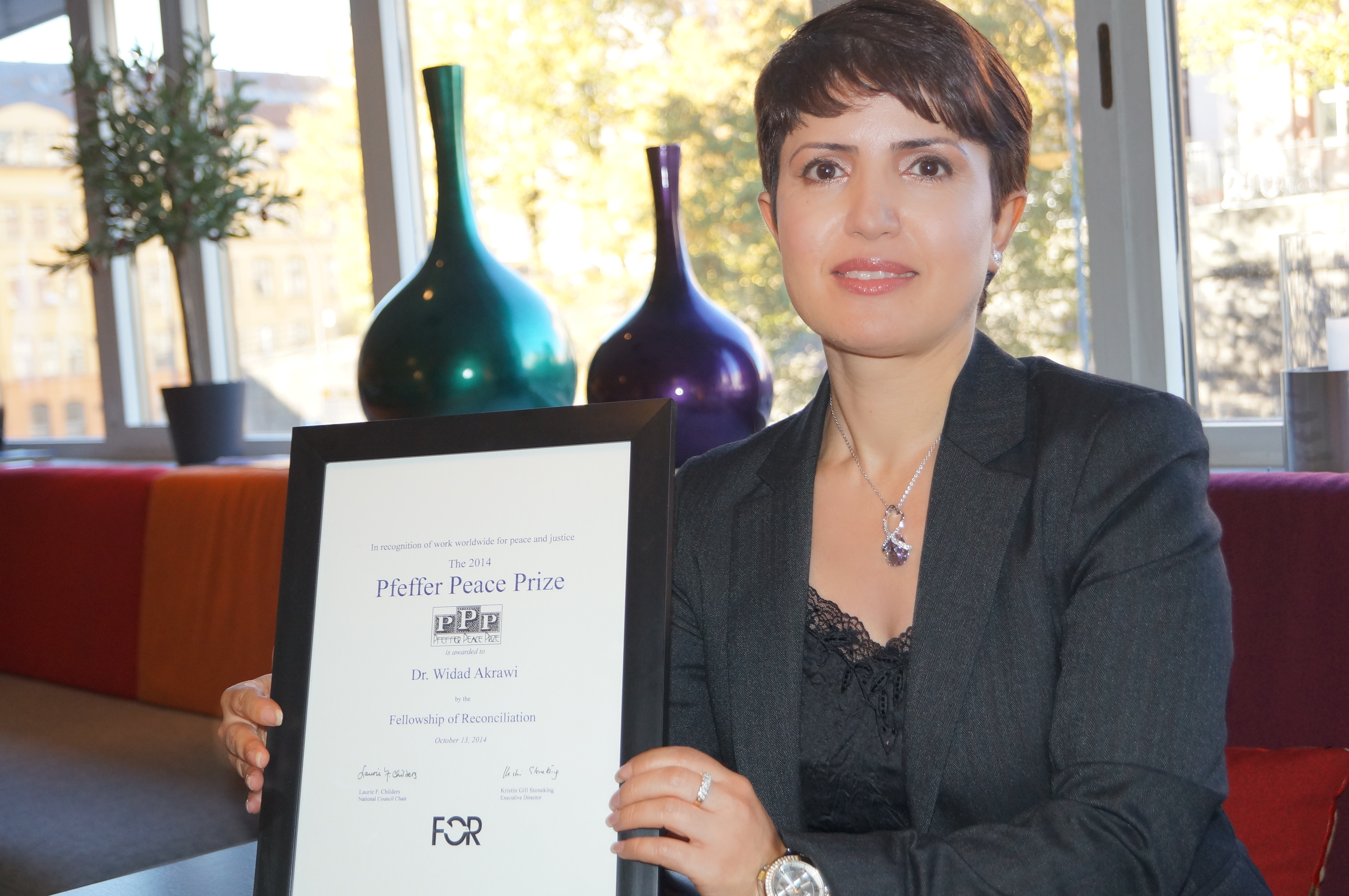
Widad Akreyi received the 2014 International Pfeffer Peace Award in October 2014

Akreyi has been awarded the 2014 International Pfeffer Peace Award for "creating momentum in favor of a UN resolution on a strong and an effective Arms Trade Treaty to prevent the illicit trade in small arms and light weapons that might be used for acts of genocide, crimes against humanity, or terrorism," as well as for lobbying for the "UN Declaration of Commitment to End Sexual Violence in Conflict and the UN Resolution 2117 dedicated to halting illicit transfer, destabilizing accumulation, and misuse of small arms and light weapons" around the world.

Following the announcement by the US Fellowship of Reconciliation on 18 September 2014, the award was presented to her on 13 October 2014 by Rev. Lucas Johnson, International Coordinator for the International Fellowship of Reconciliation. Akreyi dedicated the award to the 50 million refugees who have been displaced as a direct result of conflict, persecution or the irresponsible transfer of conventional arms, and particularly mentioned the Yazidis, Christians, and all residents of Kobanê region.

=== Pacem in Terris Peace and Freedom Award ===
External videos
- Pacem In Terris Peace and Freedom Award 2017: Dr. Widad Akreyi

Widad received the Pacem in Terris Award in 2017 for committing her life's mission to peace and justice, advocating "for human dignity for all in the Middle East," alleviating "suffering and promoting peace and equal rights and opportunities for all," and for documenting crimes against humanity and ethnic cleansing, torture and other human rights violations, as well as for her "pursuit of justice through medical research and the monitoring of peace initiatives." The Quad-City Times stated that she "earned her place among the world's brightest brokers of peace."

The 47th Pacem in Terris (Peace on Earth) Peace and Freedom Award was presented to Akreyi on 22 October 2017 by Bishop Thomas Zinkula of the Diocese of Davenport during a ceremony in Christ the King Chapel on the St. Ambrose University. Following her acceptance of the award she gave a speech about what she has witnessed, "moving some in the audience to tears." She cautioned the audience that easy solutions to the crises around the globe are not possible and said that "We must remember compassion is contagious. The more we spread it the more people will cherish it and share it."

Your mission has been to save lives, alleviate suffering and promoting peace and equal rights and opportunities for all..... Your findings regarding crimes against humanity and ethnic cleansing have brought horrific acts to light for all the world to see. You embody the words of Pope John XXIII in his encyclical Pacem in Terris as a 'spark of light, a center of love, a vivifying leaven' to your sisters and brothers around the world.

The mayor of Davenport, Iowa has presented Akreyi with the Davenport medal.

=== International Simply Woman Harmony Award ===
External videos
- International Woman Harmony Award 2018 Akreyi Widad

On 23 November 2018, Akreyi was awarded the International Simply Woman Harmony Award in Italy for her struggle against violations of human rights and gender-based violence.

== Humanitarian initiatives and peace and security efforts ==
=== Arms Trade Treaty ===
In 2005, Akreyi began advocating for a UN resolution on a strong and an effective Arms Trade Treaty to prevent the illicit trade in small arms and light weapons that might be used for acts of genocide, crimes against humanity, or terrorism.

=== Prohibition against torture ===
In 2005, she joined a campaign to require a prohibition against torture in the Danish criminal code. She has served as ambassador of Amnesty International's "Stop Torture" campaign.

=== Created bridges to Arabic-speaking audiences ===
Since 2005 she has been engaged in online discussions, blogging and other interactive techniques through which she was able to create online bridges to Arabic speaking audiences by becoming part of online dialogue and debate. In 2006, the International Secretariat of Amnesty International praised her activities in support of Amnesty's campaigns, noting that her involvement boosted Amnesty's "chances of success."

In 2008, Akreyi joined an international campaign against Eid aerial firing.

=== Gender-based violence ===
In March 2008, she joined the international campaign to end gender-based violence at gunpoint.

In a press release published in February 2013, Akreyi called on UN negotiators of the Arms Trade Treaty to include a legally-binding provision to prevent armed gender-based violence, noting the importance of maintaining the "momentum created over the last seven years" in favor of a strong and an effective Arms Trade Treaty. "We aim to provide new directions to assist in developing policy measures that counter the harmful impacts that illicit trade in small arms and light weapons have on vulnerable populations, especially on women and children" said Akreyi.

The commitment to combat gender-based violence is a crucial investment in healthy minds and bodies; it is the first step towards creating inclusive, equitable, productive and healthy societies. We need an integrated approach to end violence against females, and as civil society we are ready to provide direction and assist in the development of a global norm that counter the far-reaching impacts of gender-based violence on lives and livelihoods.

— Widad Akreyi's statement published by Everywoman Everywhere Coalition

In December 2014, Akreyi joined the Everywoman Everywhere Coalition at the Harvard Kennedy School of Government's Carr Center for Human Rights Policy. This "highly diverse coalition is driven by survivors and practitioners, with more than 50 active working group members from more than 44 countries including every continent and major geographic area" and has "come together with a singular goal: Mobilization and execution of a global, grassroots-up campaign for a universal legal tool, such as a UN Convention or Additional Protocol, that empowers every woman and girl access to legal remedy should her rights to personal security be violated." In her statement released by the EEC, she had pointed out that "violence against females is a worldwide pandemic that devastates victims, threatens families, intensifies inequality, weakens societies and undermines global efforts to combat poverty through sustainable development," and she was listed as a policy advisor.

=== Peace initiatives ===
Armed violence and peace cannot coexist. We need to overcome the challenges and seek practical solutions. We must replace the culture of war with the culture of peace.

— Widad Akreyi, addressing UN 4th Biennial Meeting of States

In June 2010, she addressed the UN Fourth Biennial Meeting of States, in New York to consider the implementation of the Programme of Action to prevent, combat, and eradicate the illicit trade in small arms and light weapons in all its aspects. She shared her views on the importance of investing in a "Culture of Peace," expressing her concerns about the proliferation of illicit trade in SALW around the world, which has significantly "intensified armed conflicts and made the proliferation of peace difficult" to achieve.

Today, we have a chance to make a difference, not only in the lives and future of the civilians witnessing these steps, but also in the lives of the generations yet to be born.

— Widad Akreyi on possible peace deal between Turkey and Kurds

In a press release published in March 2013, she welcomed the Kurdish leader's call for cease-fire; she urged the Turkish authorities not to waste a historic opportunity and called on Scandinavian countries to take the lead in negotiating a peace deal in Turkey. In a statement released two days after the 2015 Ankara bombings, she asked President Barack Obama to urge the Turkish Prime Minister to show respect for the victims of the peace rally and declare a ceasefire with the Kurdistan Workers' Party, which had already declared a unilateral ceasefire. She also asked Federica Mogherini to help end the armed violence between Turkey and the Kurds.

I have to admit that the sight of the refugees and their children has left me sleepless many nights... I am deeply saddened every time I see that people of all faiths who lived peacefully side by side are no longer tolerating each other. The brutality and misconduct they face daily is unimaginable… With their struggle to survive, comes all the horrible memories that will follow them for the rest of their lives.

— Widad Akreyi interviewed on Syrian crisis

When the Syrian crisis first erupted, she decided to advocate for a peaceful solution to the conflict. In an interview conducted in October 2013, she emphasised the massive human cost of the prevailing crisis in Syria and underlined that the conflict has radically influenced regional security and the proliferation of small arms and light weapons, making any global attempt to regulate the illicit trade in conventional weapons out of reach. She characterised the crisis as a "humanitarian tragedy of historic proportions," before urging the international community to do whatever possible to bring the crisis to an end in a peaceful and diplomatic manner.

=== Global refugee crisis ===
On the occasion of the World Refugee Day 2013, she underscored the significant contributions of resettled refugees to their new communities while expressing concern about the safety and well-being of all displaced populations. "Their challenges are many, but common for all refugees, asylum seekers, and internally displaced persons is that they have either limited or no control over their own lives... Although the world is possibly facing the worst economic crisis in its history, we must not forget the plight of refugees around the world. The international community has a responsibility to protect the rights of vulnerable asylum seekers, refugees, and returnees. We call on Member States, humanitarian agencies, and other stakeholders involved in refugee protection to ensure high standards of protection for displaced persons in neighboring countries," said Akreyi.

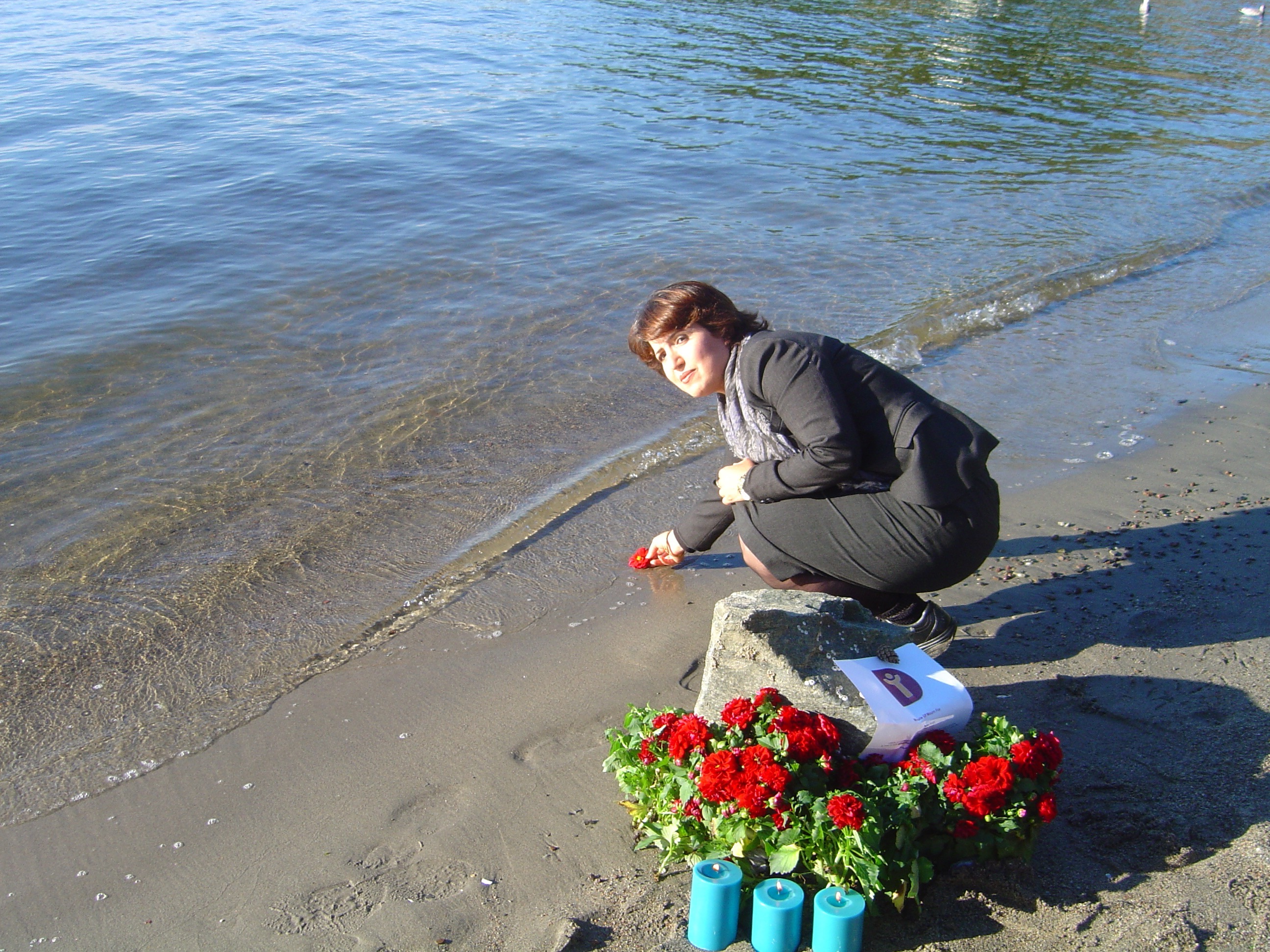
Widad Akreyi during a beach event held by Defend International in September 2015 to remember the victims of the global refugee crisis

On 4 September 2015, Akreyi organized moments of silence or prayer to honor the victims of the global refugee crisis unfolding on the shores of Europe and elsewhere. People worldwide paid tribute in memory of Alan Kurdi, his brother, his mother, their loved-ones, thousands of children who had lost their lives fleeing armed conflicts and over 2,500 refugees who had died in summer 2015 attempting to cross the Mediterranean to Europe. During a beach memorial, Akreyi expressed condolences to the families and friends of victims and called on the international community to share equitably the responsibility for protecting, assisting and hosting refugees in accordance with principles of international solidarity and human rights. She thanked volunteers and humanitarian workers for their efforts in aiding refugees.

=== Toxic remnants of war ===
Across the world, the lack of accountability for the harm to the environment and public health caused by conflict and military activities undermines global efforts to help fragile countries recover from armed conflicts.

— Widad Akreyi preface of 2014 publication on Toxic Remnants of War

In July 2014, Akreyi joined a global civil society initiative launched by Toxic Remnants of War Project to help strengthen protection for the environment and those who depend on it during and after conflict. In the preface she wrote for the publication "Pollution Politics: power, accountability and toxic remnants of war" she pointed out that toxic remnants of war may likely be "associated with the risk of birth defects, the risk of developing certain forms of cancer, or may adversely affect the neurological development of children and the reproductive processes of humans and animals. They may also impair the function of the respiratory and immune systems, thereby compromising the ability to respond to pathogens and other harmful organisms."

=== Defending victims of ISIL ===
In September 2014, Akreyi launched a worldwide campaign entitled "Save The Yazidis: The World Has To Act Now" to raise awareness about the tragedy of the Yazidis in Northern Iraq and the humanitarian emergency that continued to unfold. "The plight of the Yazidis is a humanitarian tragedy, and we want to make sure that the victims are not forgotten, protected legally, fully assisted and compensated fairly," said Akreyi. She paid tribute to all countries that had supported any minorities during the Iraqi crisis and reiterated her call for the International community to urgently intervene. Dr. Akreyi was quoted in the 2015 Annual Report of The US Commission on International Religious Freedom about the persecution of religious communities in Iraq, Syria and the surrounding region.

In October 2014, she dedicated her International Pfeffer Peace Award to the Yazidis, Christians and all residents of Kobane because, she said, facts on the ground demonstrate that these peaceful people are not safe in their enclaves, partly because of their ethnic origin and/or religion and they are therefore in urgent need for immediate attention from the global community.

On 4 November 2014, Akreyi said that "the international community should define what's happening to the Yezidis as a crime against humanity, crime against cultural heritage of the region and ethnic cleansing," adding that Yazidi females are being "subjected to as systematic gender-based violence and the use of slavery and rape as a weapon of war."

When the "price list" for Yazidi and Christian females was issued by ISIS on 3 August 2015, Akreyi and her team were the first to verify the document's authenticity and publish a translation. The document was later confirmed to be genuine by UN official Zainab Bangura.

=== Executions ===
In 2014, she joined an international campaign launched by Child Rights International Network to end all executions of juvenile offenders and to protect the rights of child domestic workers.

=== Human trafficking ===
In 2008, she joined the project "Stop Trafficking Worldwide", a campaign to stop human trafficking worldwide.

== Status and membership ==
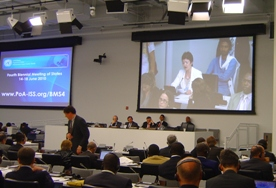
Widad Akreyi addressing the United Nations Fourth Biennial Meeting of States held in June 2010 in New York.

- She is the first Kurd to be listed as International Pfeffer Peace Prize laureate.
- She has been awarded the 2013 'Special Prize' by the National Organisation for Future Generations for being a passionate advocate of bridging the gap between civilisations and cultures, and making valuable contributions to humanity through the creation of a culture of coexistence and harmony.
- Supported the Universal Citizenship Passport initiative of the Organisation for Universal Citizenship
- Co-founder, Defend International.
- Defend International representative to the UN Fourth Biennial Meeting of States, held in New York to review the implementation of the Programme of Action to prevent, combat, and eradicate the illicit trade in small arms and light weapons in all its aspects (14–18 June 2010).
- Defend International representative to the General Assembly Interactive Hearings with Non-governmental organizations, Civil society organizations and the Private sector. (UN Headquarters in NY, 14–15 June 2010).
- Defend International representative to the First Committee (Disarmament and International Security Committee) of the United Nations General Assembly (October 2009).
- Defend International representative to the First Committee (Disarmament and International Security Committee) of the United Nations General Assembly (October 2008).
- Defend International representative to the UN Third Biennial Meeting of States, held in New York to consider the implementation of the Programme of Action to prevent, combat, and eradicate the illicit trade in small arms and light weapons in all its aspects (July 2008).
- Defend International representative to the 52nd session of the UN Commission on the Status of Women held at United Nations Headquarters in New York (February to March 2008).
- Defend International representative to the First Committee (Disarmament and International Security Committee) of the UN General Assembly (October 2007).
- Defend International representative to Global Alliance for Clean Cookstoves.
- Amnesty International lobbyist to the First Committee (Disarmament and International Security Committee) of the UN General Assembly (October 2006).
- Advisor, Everywoman Everywhere Coalition, Harvard Kennedy School, USA (December 2014).
- Member of the board, Women of Europe Award.
- Member of the IANSA Women's Network Working Group.
- Member of Cluster Munition Coalition.
- Member of the board, Amnesty International (30 April 2006 – 18 June 2007).
- Ambassador for Amnesty International's Stop Torture campaign (9 February 2006 – 18 June 2007).
- Member of jury board, Amnesty International's Arabic Short Novel Competition (April 2006-June 2007).
- Establishment of a special blog for Amnesty's Control Arms Campaign (June 2006)

== Bibliography ==
- The Viking's Kurdish Love (2016) The Viking's Kurdish Love: A True Story of Zoroastrians' Fight for Survival, Part I: 988-1003
- Statistical Versus Clinical Significance in Clinical Trials on Patients with Gestational Diabetes. Munich: GRIN Publishing GmbH. 2014. ISBN 978-3656572145.
- Measures of Asthma Status: Need for Standardized Methodologies for Management. Munich: GRIN Publishing GmbH. 2014. ISBN 978-3656572114.
- Predictors of Assisted-Living Residents' Mental Health Status. Munich: GRIN Publishing GmbH. 2014. ISBN 978-3656572084.
- The Association Between Vitamin E Intake and Lung Cancer Risk and the Effect Modification of Dietary Intake of Fat and Fatty Acids on This Association: A Case-Control Study Based on the NHANES Datasets 1999-2010. USA. 2013. ISBN 9781303351792.
- Proposed Evaluation of Cervical Cancer Prevention Strategies: Does Current Approach to Cervical Cancer Control Achieve Its Objectives?. Munich: GRIN Publishing GmbH. 2013. ISBN 978-3656507529.
- The Association Between Vitamin D Status and Colon Cancer Risk: A Review and Synthesis. Munich: GRIN Publishing GmbH. 2013. ISBN 978-3656509882.
- Statistical Evaluation of Two Medical Databases: A Framework for Descriptive, Bivariate, and Multivariate Analyses. Munich: GRIN Publishing GmbH. 2013. ISBN 978-3656506881.
- The Dose-Response Relationship of Vitamin E and Lung Cancer Risk: Empirical and Mechanism-Based Models. Munich: GRIN Publishing GmbH. 2013. ISBN 978-3656507697.
- Global Burden of Disease and Epidemiological Aspects: Plausible Scenarios of Burden of Infectious and Chronic Diseases and Two Population Pyramids. Munich: GRIN Publishing GmbH. 2011. ISBN 978-3656507116.
- Taras book. Zagros Publishing. 2005. ISBN 9788292628003.
- Taras book: A Story from Kurdistan. Forum. 2003. ISBN 87-553-3420-2.
- Master's Thesis II: A Comprehensive Assessment of Biological Function of Newly Sequenced yutK Gene in Basillus Subtilis. Munich: GRIN Publishing GmbH. 1999. ISBN 978-3-656-47467-8.
- Master's Thesis I: Function-Analysis of Seventeen Function-Unknown Genes in Bacillus Subtilis. Munich: GRIN Publishing GmbH. 1998. ISBN 978-3-656-46782-3.

== See also ==
- List of peace activists
- List of women's rights activists
- List of Iraqis
- Kurdish women
- Iraqi women
