= Bouthaina al-Rimi =

Yemeni baby girl

Bouthaina al-Rimi is a Yemeni baby girl whose home in the Attan neighborhood of Sanaa, the capital of Yemen, was bombed and destroyed on 25 August 2017 by a Saudi-led coalition airstrike. The explosion tragically claimed the lives of her parents and six siblings. Following her rescue, a photographer captured a poignant image of Bouthaina attempting to open one of her swollen and bruised eyes. This photograph has since become a symbol representing the devastating impact of the ongoing war in the Middle Eastern country. Since 2015, this picture has been often associated with images of Omran Daqneesh and Alan Kurdi.

== The Aftermath ==
- As Bouthaina's picture went viral on the social media, Thousands of Yemenis uploaded photos of themselves with one eye closed and using a hand to open the other eye wider to show solidarity with the plight of Bouthaina.
- On September 1, 2017, former Yemeni president Ali Abdullah Saleh announced that he is adopting Bouthaina.
- The Arabic hashtag #Bouthaina_The_Eye_Of_Humanity and #I_SPEAK_FOR_BUTHINA have both been used more than 3,000 times within 24 hours since the bombing

== See also ==
- Yemen Civil War
- Alan Kurdi
