= Shuyukh Fawqani =

Shuyukh Fawqani شيوخ فوقاني Şexlêr Jorin
- Town
- Location of Shuyukh Fawqani in Syria
- Coordinates: 36°46′19″N 38°02′41″E
- Country: Syria
- Governorate: Aleppo
- District: Ayn al-Arab
- Subdistrict: Shuyukh Tahtani

Population (2004)
  - Total: 9,303
- Time zone: UTC+3 (AST)
- Geocode: C2002

Shuyukh Fawqani (Arabic: شيوخ فوقاني, lit. 'Upper Shuyukh'; Kurdish: Şexlêr Jorin) is a town in northeastern Aleppo Governorate, northern Syria.

Located on the eastern banks of river Euphrates, across Jarabulus Tahtani, and some 5 km (3.1 mi) north of Shuyukh Tahtani, the town is the largest settlement of Nahiya Shuyukh Tahtani with 9,303 inhabitants, as per the 2004 census. al-Nasiriyyah Bridge, a modern road bridge, connected the town with both Jarabulus and the city of Manbij, some 30 km (19 mi) to the southwest, until the bridge was destroyed by ISIL in March 2015.

== Syrian Civil War ==
On 6 March 2015, following the Kurdish retaking of Kobanî, ISIL blew up the western side of al-Nasiriyyah Bridge, a modern road bridge that had previously been damaged by artillery on 10 February 2014.
