= African Clean Energy =

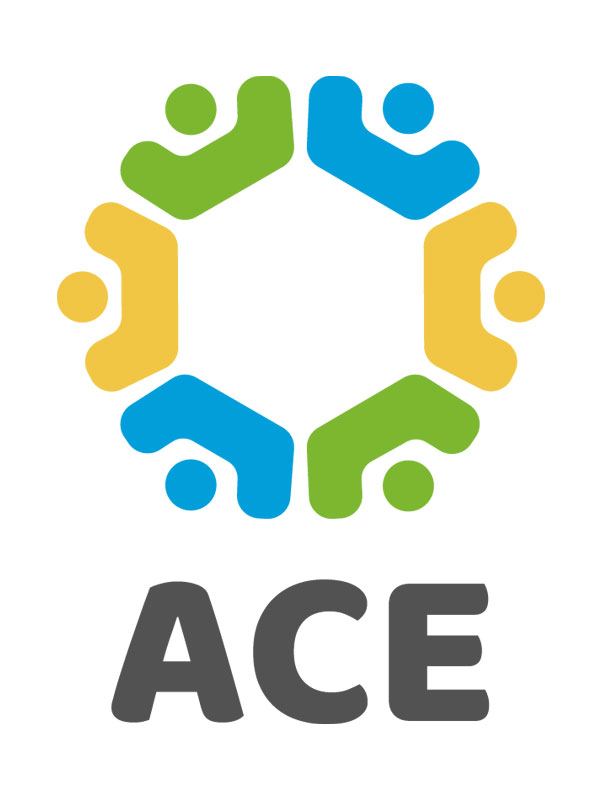
- Type: Privately held company
- Industry: Clean Energy Technology
- Founded: 2011
- Founder: Ruben Walker; Stephen Walker
- Headquarters: Amsterdam, The Netherlands
- Area served: Lesotho; Uganda; Cambodia; The Netherlands
- Key people: Ruben Walker (CEO); Judith Joan Walker (COO)
- Products: ACE One Energy System
- Number of employees: 205

African Clean Energy is a B Corp-certified enterprise which produces and distributes solar-biomass hybrid energy systems in developing countries. The company was founded in Lesotho, where it manufactures the ACE One Energy System. The company's headquarters are in Amsterdam, the Netherlands.

== History ==
African Clean Energy (ACE) is a family-owned business founded in 2011 by Ruben Walker and his father, Stephen Walker. Ruben Walker studied environmental engineering in Australia. Prior to founding ACE, Ruben owned a bamboo flooring company, as a sustainable alternative to wood. The ACE One was developed in 2014 with support from crowdfunding and the Global Alliance for Clean Cookstoves. As of 2017, the company is active in Lesotho, Cambodia and Uganda.Stephen Walker, an expert in manufacturing, helped set up ACE's factories in Lesotho and Cambodia. The company expects to open a third factory in Uganda in 2020.

== The biomass cooking sector ==
More than 3 billion people cook using solid biomass fuels like wood, crop waste, coal and animal dung. There are also 1.2 billion people without access to electricity, who currently rely on dangerous fuels like kerosene for lighting.

The World Health Organization estimates that 4.3 million people die prematurely every year from illnesses attributable to household air pollution from burning solid fuels. These include lung cancer, stroke, heart disease, pulmonary disease and childhood pneumonia. Exposure to indoor smoke is particularly high amongst women and girls, who are typically responsible for cooking. The responsibility of sourcing fuel for cooking and heating also predominantly falls on women, who spend hours each day collecting firewood for their homes, cutting short their potential to study or do other things.

The ACE One Energy System was designed to address these issues, while still being compatible with widely available biomass fuels, such as sticks, animal waste and agricultural waste. It is capable of burning any type of solid biomass smokelessly, and provides electricity for households that do not have access to the grid.

== The product ==
=== Functionality ===
The ACE One has an integrated lithium-ion ferrophosphate battery which powers a small fan. The fan draws oxygen into the burning chamber of the device, intensifying the fire inside. This causes the biomass to gasify, ensuring complete combustion and creating a smokeless flame. The battery will power the fan for 20 hours, and can be charged using the included 10W solar panel.

The latest ACE One includes a microprocessor and is sold with a second-use Samsung smartphone, giving the device "smart" capabilities. This means that customers can connect their smartphones with the ACE One. Customers can use the pre-installed ACE Connect app on their phones in order to track their loan repayments and contact ACE customer services directly. ACE are using the ACE One's smart functionality to implement a flexible 'pay-as-you-save' model as the unit can now be remotely switched off if the customer stops paying for it.

The Colorado State University has certified the ACE One as an IWA-ISO Tier 3 for emissions and efficiency, and 4 for safety in laboratory tests. The product has been field tested in Cambodia by the Berkeley Air Monitoring Group, who estimate that every 25,000 units in use will avert as many as 40 early deaths, and avert 1,295 Disability-adjusted life years (aDALYs).

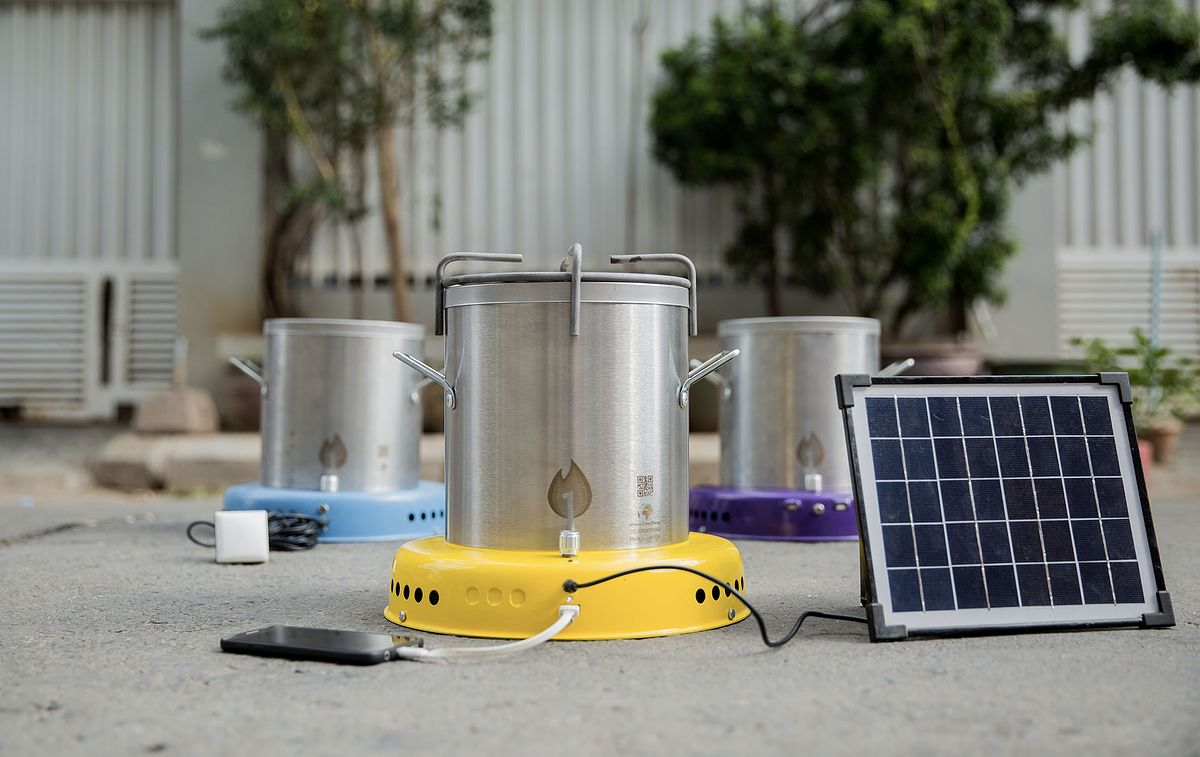
The ACE One Energy System

=== Key features ===
- Fuel Savings: Through efficient combustion, the ACE One can reduce fuel use by up to 70% compared to an open fire. In Cambodia, researchers found that the product reduces fuel use by 52% compared to traditional Khmer stoves. By using the ACE One, customers can cut their basic energy expenses by up to 80%.
- Reduced Emissions: The ACE One burns biomass without smoke, reducing CO and PM 2.5 emissions by as much as 95% compared to an open fire.
- Solar Electricity: The ACE One has an integrated USB port which can be used for charging mobile devices. The product also includes an LED lamp attachment.

== The business model ==
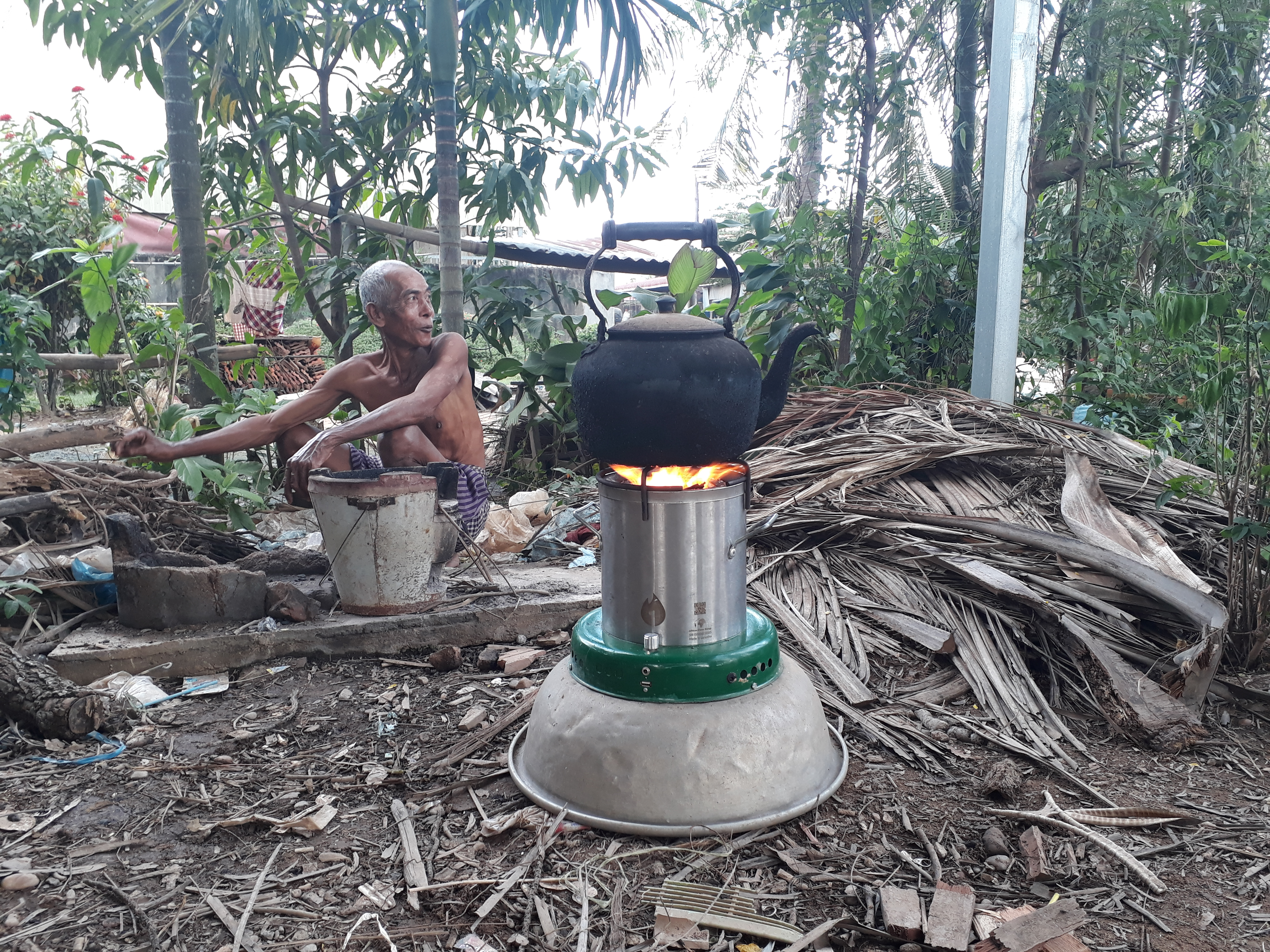
ACE Cambodia

African Clean Energy is a for-profit company. It is currently active in Lesotho, Cambodia and Uganda, and its flagship factory is located in Lesotho. The ACE One is sold direct to consumers in these countries using an instalment-based payment model at a cost of about $100 each. This ensures that the product is affordable to people who would be unable to afford a large lump sum payment. To date, the company has sold about 60,000 units.

The company has a potential market of approximately 900 million households. ACE is currently expanding its mobile retail shops to give more people access to its products and services, in a project which is being co-funded by the European Union.
