= The Boy on the Beach =

2019 memoir by Tima Kurdi

The Boy on the Beach: My Family's Escape from Syria and Our Hope for a New Home
- Author: Tima Kurdi
- Publisher: Simon & Schuster
- Publication date: April 17, 2018
- Pages: 288
- ISBN: 9781501175244

The Boy on the Beach is a 2018 memoir by Tima Kurdi about her family's attempts to escape the Syrian civil war and the circumstances that lead to the death of Alan Kurdi.

== Production ==
The Boy on the Beach was published in 2018 by Simon & Schuster, written by Canadian-Syrian activist Tima Kurdi. Kurdi has spoken in two media interviews about how she sees the book as a call to action for the global community to do more for refugees.

== Synopsis ==
The Boy on the Beach documents the Kurdi family's efforts to escape the Syrian civil war and the circumstances that led to the deaths of Alan, Ghalib Kurdi, and Rehanna (their mother), in 2015. The book starts by describing the family's comfortable life in Damascus prior to the Syrian civil war. As war starts, the family move to Kobanî, before fleeing Syria and attempting to cross the Mediterranean Sea. When their boat capsizes, their father, Abdullah Kurdi, survives, but his two children Alan and Ghalib both drown along with his wife Rehanna. A photograph of Alan caught the attention of the international media and public attention.

== Critical reception ==
The book made the long-list for the Canada Reads 2019 book competition.

Book reviewer, Sheniz Janmohamed, writing in Quill & Quire credits the author for humanising the Syria conflict.

== See also ==
- 2015 European migrant crisis
