= Kobani =

City in northern Syria

- City
- Ayn al-Arab
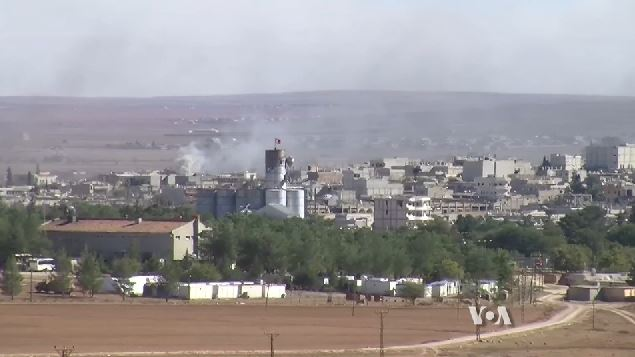
- View of Kobanî during the siege in 2014
- Interactive map of Kobani
- Location of Kobani in Syria Kobani (Asia)
- Coordinates: 36°53′28″N 38°21′13″E
- Country: Syria
- Governorate: Aleppo
- District: Ayn al-Arab
- Subdistrict: Ayn al-Arab
- Founded: 1915

Government
  - Mayor: Almaz Rumi
  - Deputy Mayor: Muslim Abdul Ghani Muslim

Area
  - City: 7 km^{2} (2.7 sq mi)
- Elevation: 520 m (1,710 ft)

Population (2004 census)
  - City: 44,821
  - Estimate (2015): 40,000
  - Nahiyah: 78,130
- Time zone: UTC+3 (AST)
- P-Code: C1946
- Geocode: SY020600

Kobanî, (Note: Kurdish: Kobanî or Kobanê, pronounced [koˈbaːniː]; Arabic: كُوبَانِي, romanized: Kūbānī) also known as Kobane or Ayn al-Arab, (Note: Arabic: عَيْن الْعَرَب, romanized: ʿAyn al-ʿArab, lit. 'Spring of the Arabs', Arabic pronunciation: [ʕeːn elˈʕɑrɑb]) is a Kurdish-majority city in the Ayn al-Arab District in northern Syria, lying immediately south of the Syria–Turkey border.

As a consequence of the Syrian civil war, the city came under the control of the Kurdish-majority People's Protection Units (YPG) militia in 2012 and became the administrative center of the Kobani Canton, later transformed into Euphrates Region of the Democratic Autonomous Administration of North and East Syria.

From September 2014 to January 2015, the city was under siege by the Islamic State of Iraq and the Levant. Most of the eastern parts of the city were destroyed and most of the population fled to Turkey. In 2015, many returned and reconstruction began.

In mid October 2019, Kurdish forces accepted the entry of the Syrian Army and Russian Military Police in a bid to stop Turkey from invading the town.

Prior to the Syrian civil war, Kobani was recorded as having a population of close to 45,000. According to 2013 estimates, the majority of the inhabitants were Kurds, with Arab, Turkmen, and Armenian minorities.

== Names ==
One theory of the origin of the Kurdish name Kobanî (كوباني) is the word company, referring to the German railway company who built the section of the Konya-Baghdad Railway that the city is placed along from 1911. However, this is doubted by some who point out that company in German is “Gesellschaft”, whereas "Kompanie" (meaning company) refers solely to military units. (This not true, however, as business partnerships with more than two partners were called Compagnie at the time, and the abbreviation Co. remains established in German.) Others have suggested that the origin of the middle of the word Kobanî could come from the German "Bahn", meaning road, as the railroad was in fact named "Anatolische Eisenbahn".

The Ottoman Turkish name of the eastern village was Arab Punarı (Ottoman Turkish: عرب پیناری, Turkish: Arap Pınar, lit. 'Spring of the Arabs'), and Kobani's Arabic name, ʿAyn al-ʿArab (عين العرب), is a translation of this. The word "spring" refers to the creek that used to flow east of the village, and during the summer Arab nomads would bring their herds to the location. This village was located south of a small lake that dried up in the 1960s. The name Mürşitpinar is still used as the name for the western village and the railway station in the Turkish side.

== History ==
=== Ottoman period ===
Historical population
Year	Pop.	±%
2005	54,681	—
2015	40,000	−26.8%
2016	44,821	+12.1%

Prior to World War I, the area was mainly populated by Kurdish tribes, many but not all of which were part of the Milli confederation. These tribes had progressively migrated in from the north during the 19th century, pushing back the Bedouin Arab tribes which had previously occupied the area. Local Kurds living in the plains to the east of the modern town reportedly provided lodgings at their encampment for a French-led archaeological team on its way to survey the nearby ancient Assyrian site of Arslan Tashî (Kurdish: Shêran) in the summer of 1883.

In 1892, there were three homesteads situated in the area. During the construction of the Baghdad Railway (launched by the Ottoman Empire to connect Baghdad with Berlin), Kurdish raiders from the Busrawi and Shahin Bey clans—rivals who lived south and east of today's Kobani - reportedly harassed work crews attempting to mine basalt from the nearby hills, partially because the German companies responsible for its construction were lax in providing payment and compensation to local landowners. German engineers staying in the area from 1912 to 1913 described Arab Punar as a "small Kurdish village around 35 km (22 mi) east of the Euphrates" comprising a small cluster of square mud-brick huts, many with domed roofs; the local chief's hut was notable among these in its incorporation of European-style doors and windows and its concrete flooring. The area was apparently also known for its swarms of biting sand-flies.

The newly built town began to form south of a simple train station built in 1912 along the railway by workers from the nearby town of Suruç. The train station was part of the Baghdad Railway project launched by the Ottoman government to connect Baghdad with Berlin. Refugees fleeing the Armenian genocide in the Ottoman Empire settled in the newly built town around 1915, and were soon joined by more Kurds from nearby areas.

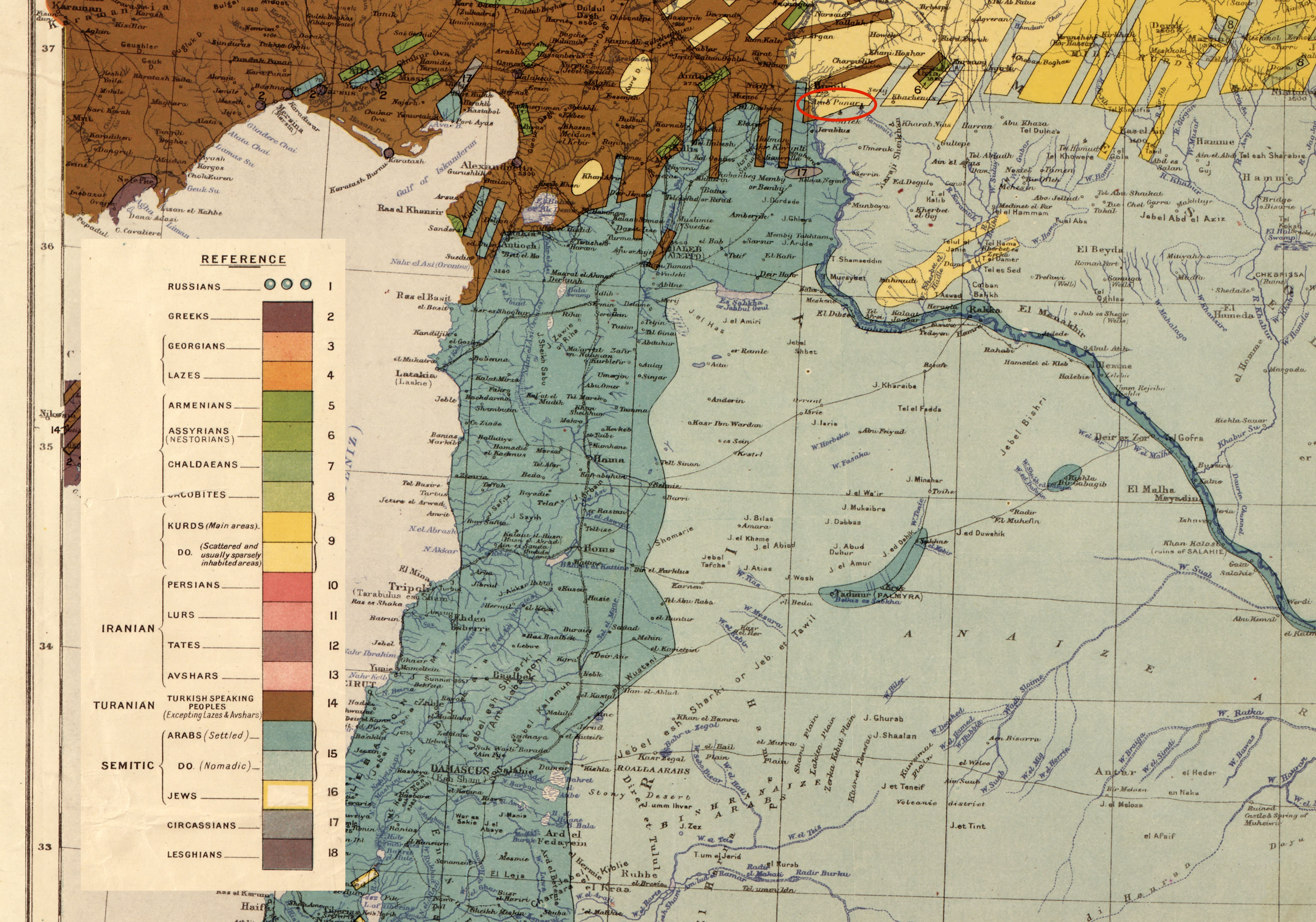
Maunsell's ethnographical map of northern Syria in 1910. Location of Ayn al-Arab (Arab punar) marked on top center of map

=== French Mandate ===
Some of the Kurds who settled in Kobani were originally from the Kurdish regions in Turkey. Some fled persecution following the Kurdish-led Sheikh Said rebellion in 1925. After the demarcation of the border with Turkey along the railway line in 1921, the northern part of Ayn al-Arab was left on the Turkish side. This small settlement is incorporated in the Suruç district and still has a little railway station and a border crossing gate. By the middle of the 20th century, there were three Armenian churches and two schools in the town, but many Armenians emigrated to the Armenian Soviet Socialist Republic in the 1960s while others moved to bigger cities, including Aleppo and Beirut, as well as cities in the US and other countries. The town was also home to a small Syriac Orthodox community, but their numbers dwindled and the town's only Syriac Orthodox church was demolished in the early 1960s.

The city's infrastructural layout was largely planned and constructed by French authorities during the Mandatory period, and a number of French-built buildings were still standing and in use until recently. During this period, the city of Suruç served as the regional center of Kobani. The area was marked by several border crossings with Turkey, unsanctioned by either the Turkish or French Mandatory governments. The crossings became a source of numerous Turkish complaints and led to the establishment of a French intelligence office in Kobani to monitor border activity. Throughout the 20th century, the border remained officially closed even as the neighbouring towns of Tell Abyad and Jarablus—both of which had smaller Kurdish populations—were allowed to have commercial border crossings, a situation which economically marginalised Kobani for many years. However, there was limited traffic at the Kobani-Mürşitpinar gate and passengers from Kobani often crossed through it to travel by train to Aleppo. By 2011, as a result of the Syrian Civil War, traffic through this gate increased. Wounded and sick people could cross to the Turkish side while trucks carrying goods crossed into Kobani from Mürşitpınar.

=== Syria pre-autonomy ===
Prior to the Syrian Civil War, Kobani was the administrative center of Nahiya Ayn al-Arab and Ayn al-Arab District.

When Syria gained independence from France in 1946, the intelligence building served as the political office of the Kobani area's highest-ranking local administrator. Kobani started to develop as a city in the 1950s when it was further separated from Suruç as a result of the Turkish government mining of the border area.

=== Syrian Civil War ===
==== Siege by ISIL ====
The People's Protection Units (YPG) took control of Kobani on 19 July 2012. The Syrian authorities in Kobani and other Kurdish towns evacuated the government offices and centers without any fighting taking place between the Syrian and Kurdish forces. Since July 2012, Kobani has been under Kurdish control. The YPG and Kurdish politicians anticipated autonomy for the area, which they consider part of Rojava. After similar less intense events earlier in 2014, on 2 July the town and surrounding villages came under a massive attack from fighters of the Islamic State of Iraq and the Levant. On 16 September, ISIL resumed its siege of Kobani with a full-scale assault from the west and the south of the city.

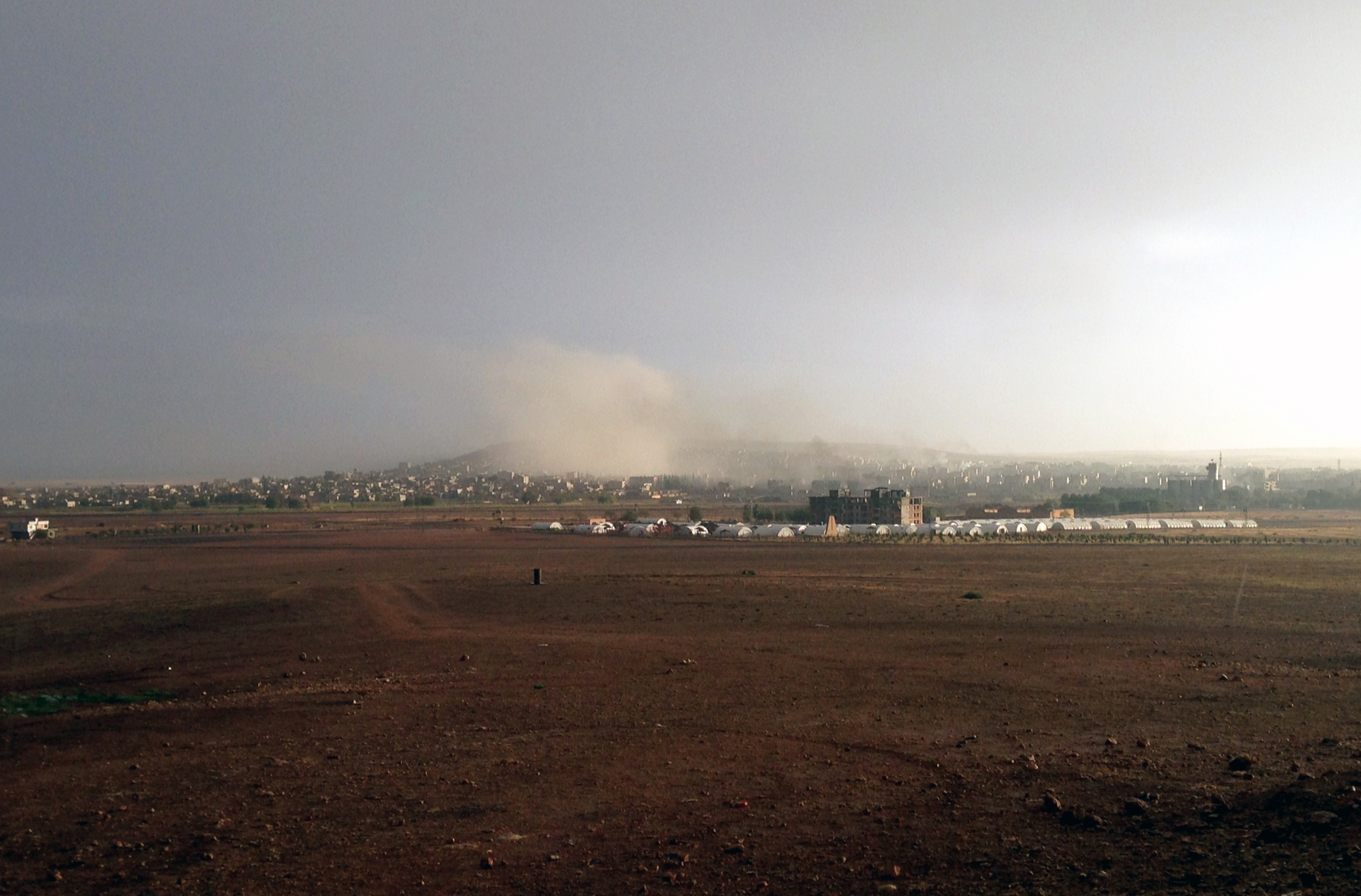
Kobani during the bombardment of ISIL targets by US-led forces. Photo taken from Turkish-Syrian border at Suruç, Turkey showing refugee camp in the middle distance (October 2014)

Kobani Canton had been under attack by ISIL militants for several months. In September 2014, militants occupied most of the Kobani region, seizing more than 100 Kurdish villages. As a consequence of the ISIL occupation, up to 200,000 Kurdish refugees fled from Kobani Canton to Turkey. Turkish authorities did not allow the refugees to enter with any vehicles or livestock that they had.

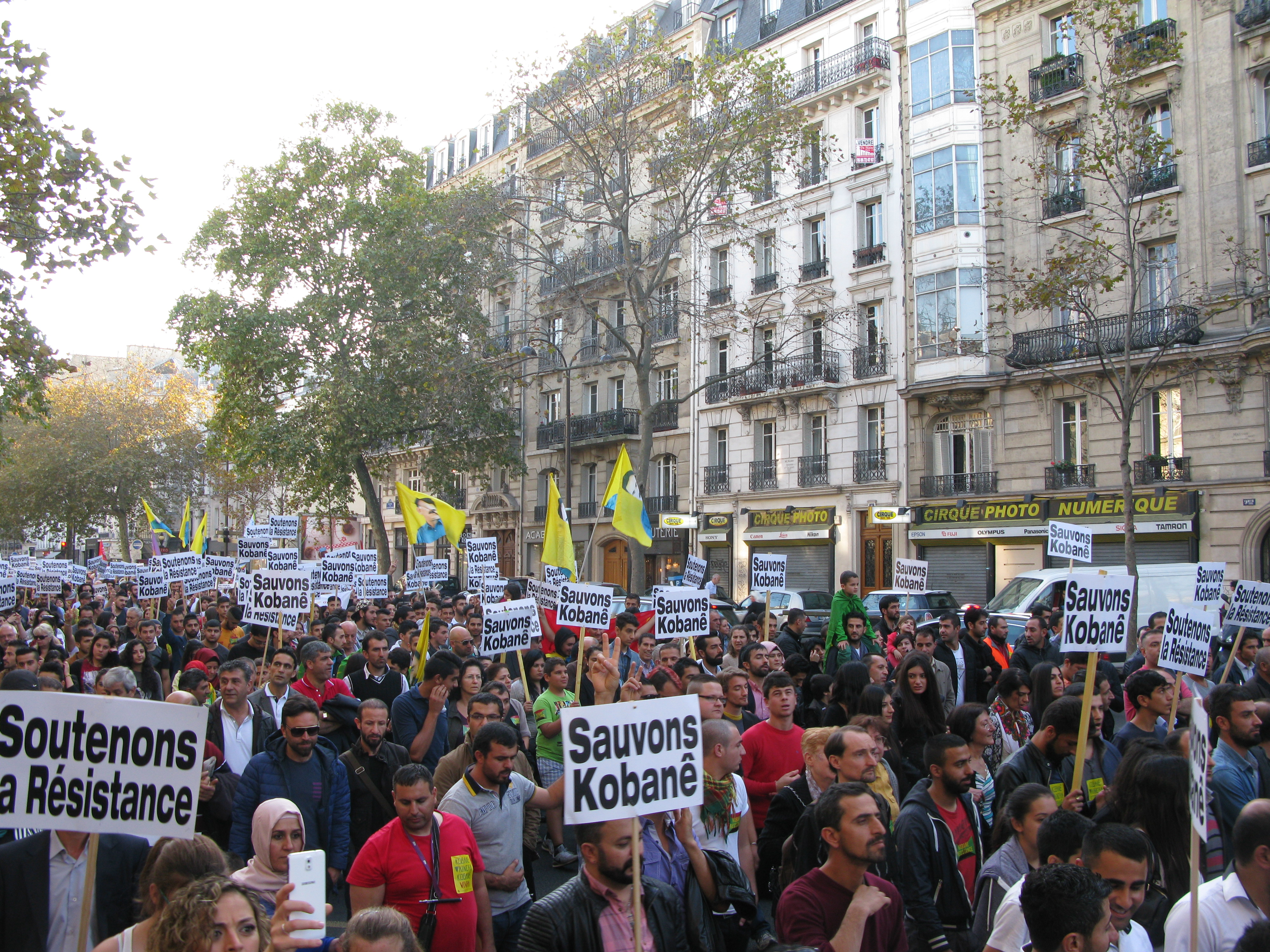
Paris Kurds rally in support of Kobani on 1 November 2014

In captured villages, militants committed massacres and kidnapped women. IS militants, however, were not able to occupy all of Kobani itself, as the YPG and YPJ forces managed to defend a part of Kobani and later several nearby settlements. After weeks of isolation, which resulted from Turkey's preventing arms and fighters from entering the town (which in turn was due to the general hostility of the Turkish establishment towards Kurds with any links to the PKK), the US-led coalition began to target ISIL with a larger number of airstrikes. From September 2014 through January 2015, hundreds of airstrikes struck ISIL fighters and leveled most of the administrative buildings and houses in the city center, helping to stop the ISIL advance. On 20 October there were reports that Turkey, under significant US pressure, would allow Kurdish fighters from Iraqi Kurdistan to cross into Kobani. About 150 Kurdish troops were admitted on 29 October, which then began to turn the tide of the siege in favor of the Kurds. The YPG forced ISIL to retreat from Kobani on 26 January 2015, thus lifting the siege. Following the victory the city received the nickname "Kurdish Stalingrad".

===== Reaction =====
The humanitarian response to the people from Kobani who were displaced to Suruc, Turkey, was highly polarized, with actors associated with the Turkish state on the one hand, and the pro-Kurdish movement on the other. In September 2014, Defend International launched a worldwide campaign aimed at, among other things, raising awareness about Kobani and the brutal attacks its residents were subjected to, and building connections between potential partners and communities whose work is relevant to the campaign, including individuals, groups, communities, and NGOs.

In October 2014, Widad Akrawi, President of Defend International, dedicated her 2014 International Pfeffer Peace Award to, among others, all residents of Kobane because, she said, facts on the ground demonstrate that these peaceful people are not safe in their enclaves, partly because of their ethnic origin and/or religion, and they are therefore in urgent need for immediate attention from the global community. She asked the international community to make sure that the victims are not forgotten; they should be rescued, protected, fully assisted and compensated fairly.

On 4 November 2014, Akrawi said that "a massacre can be avoided, if there is a well-organized and well-defined plan on how to deal with IS – a plan that sets out the strategic and tactical activities to be undertaken at the international, regional and local levels," adding that journalists, humanitarian- and human rights organizations are not allowed to pass through Turkish checkpoints near the border.

===== June 2015 massacre =====
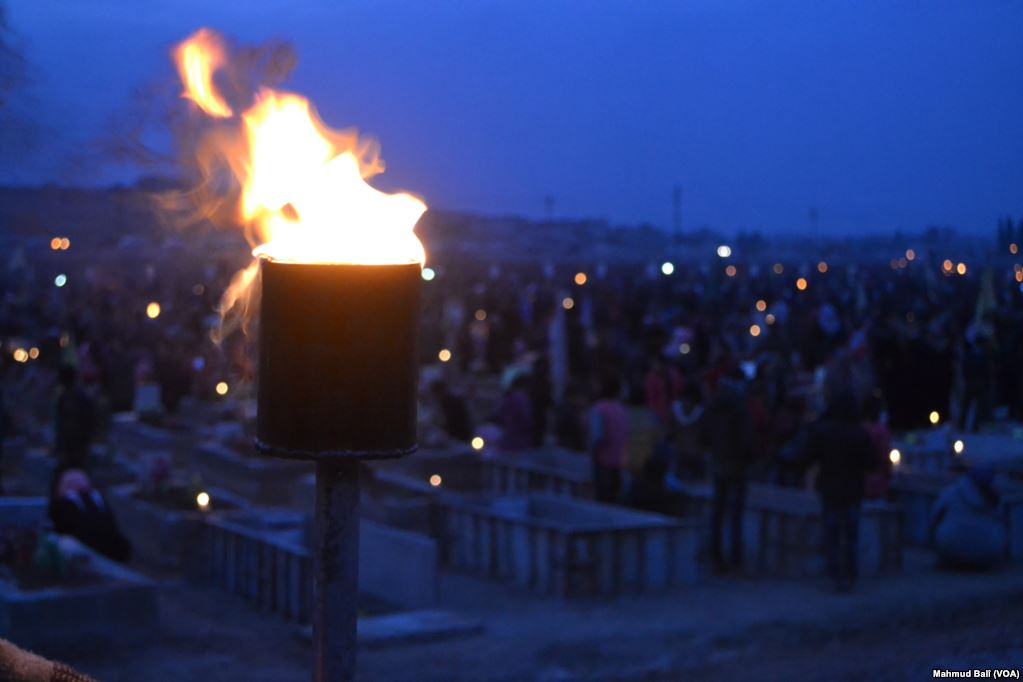
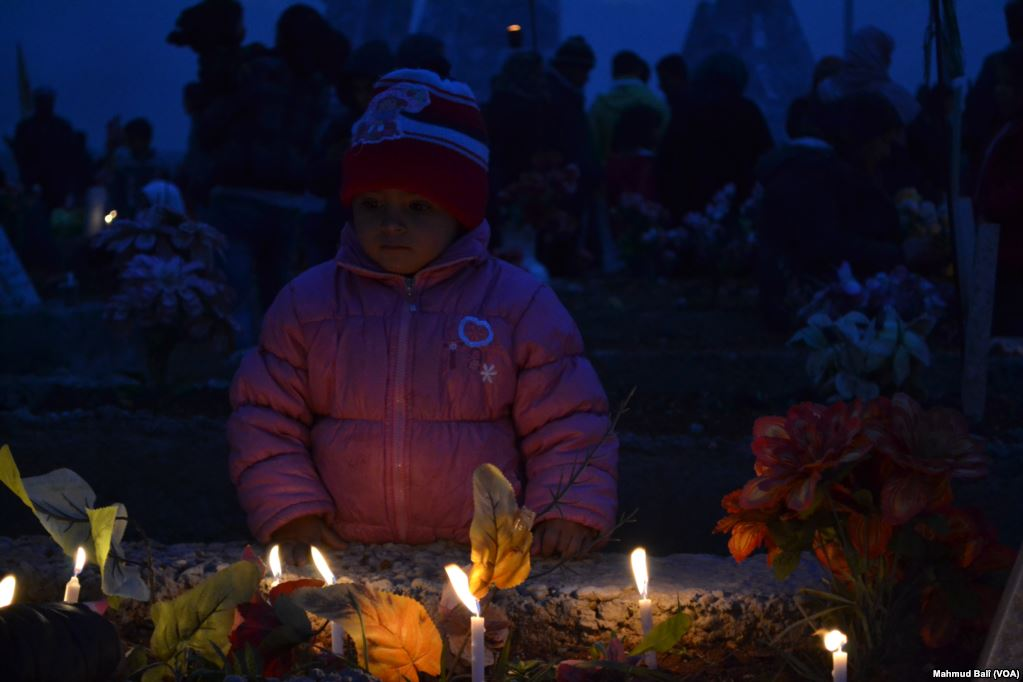
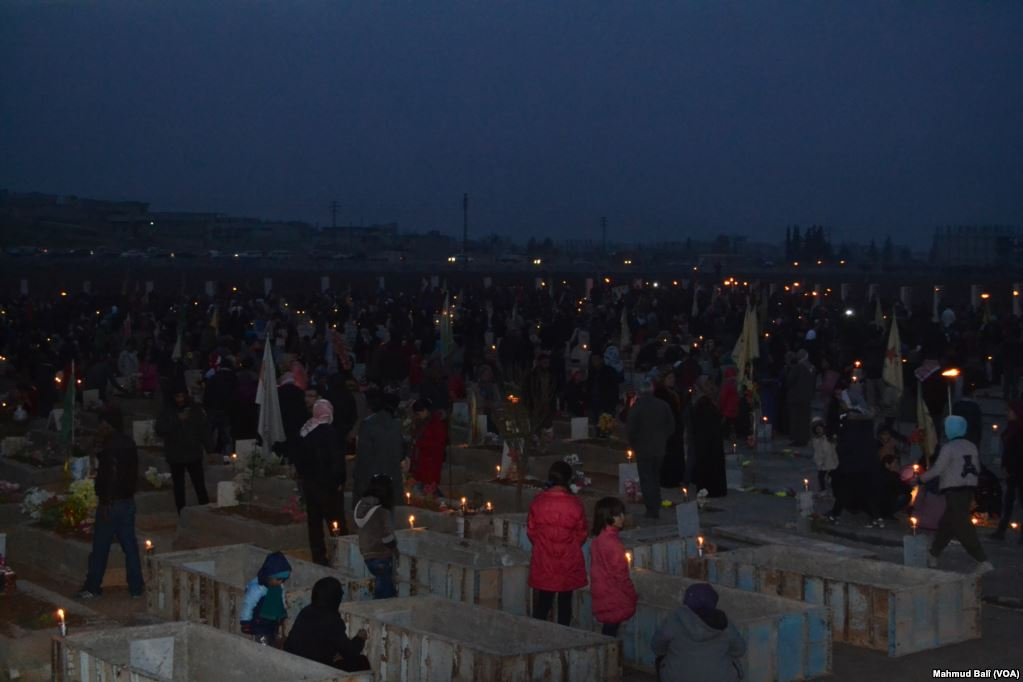
Martyrs' Cemetery, Kobanî

On 25 June 2015, fighters from the Islamic State of Iraq and the Levant detonated three car bombs in Kobani, close to the Turkish border crossing and launched a surprise assault on the town. At least 220 Kurdish civilians were massacred in mass killings by ISIL fighters or were killed by the group's rockets. Many more were wounded by the attack, making it one of the worst massacres carried out by ISIL in Syria. In another report Syrian Observatory for Human Rights and spokesman for the Kurdish People's Protection Units said that more than 200 Kurdish civilians were massacred. Women and children were among the bodies found inside houses and on the streets of Kobani and its surrounding villages. The Syrian Observatory for Human Rights said that ISIL fired at anything that moved. Islamic State also committed a massacre in the village of Barkh Butan, about 20 kilometers south of Kobani, executing at least 23 Syrian Kurds, among them women and children. Kurdish forces and the Syrian government claimed the vehicles had entered the city from across the border, an action denied by Turkey.

==== Reconstruction and development ====
After the ISIL siege was broken in early 2015, the Kobane Reconstruction Board asked for international assistance. According to a spokesman for the Syrian Kurds who control the town, Kobani had been 70% destroyed. There have been several attempts to support Kobani, especially from the Kurdish communities in Turkey and Iraq. Assistance was also offered by several European organizations. As of May 2015, Turkey has kept the border closed but allowed some materials to reach the city. The international community, including the US, has not shown interest in rebuilding the town, nor have they pressured Turkey on the matter. By May 2015 more than 50,000 people had returned to the destroyed town. In May the Kobani authorities, with the help of the municipality of Diyarbakır, managed to restore the water pump and supply for the urban area after 8 months without running water, repairing the pipelines and cleaning the main water tank. By May 2016, despite the challenges of the blockade by Turkey, reconstruction and return of inhabitants was well on the way.

In September 2016, Kurdish Red Crescent opened a hospital in the city under the name of "Kobani Hospital", their first hospital in Kobani Canton, after several international organizations like UNICEF and Médecins Sans Frontières (MSF) had been sending them special medical equipment. It was established in a hospital formerly owned by Dr. Ezzat Afandi, an Austrian citizen.

In an October 2016 report from the city of Kobani, U.S. academic Si Sheppard observed: "Since the siege of Kobani ended, reconstruction has barely begun to compensate for the havoc wrought on the city by both ISIS artillery and coalition airstrikes (...). Herculean efforts have cleared the streets, but water and power have yet to be restored. Although commerce is trickling back to life (...), more than half of the residential structures still standing are little more than blown out concrete shells. Yet the spirit of the people endures: Some now use defused ISIS rounds as ashtrays and flower pots."

By 2019, atrocities by ISIL have driven many families of Kobani to convert to Christianity, while others chose to become atheists and agnostics.

Over the years various projects were undertaken by the Autonomous Administration's Economic Authority and the Kongreya Star to revitalize life, economic development and woman's empowerment in the city. These projects include Vîna Jin (lit. Women's Will), which offers job opportunities for illiterate women, Khairat Al-Furat Factory, which manufactures jam, molasses, tomatoes, peppers and spices, the Young Women's Agriculture Co-op and many more sewing workshops, bakeries, beauty and hair salons.

==== Entry of Syrian and Russian forces ====
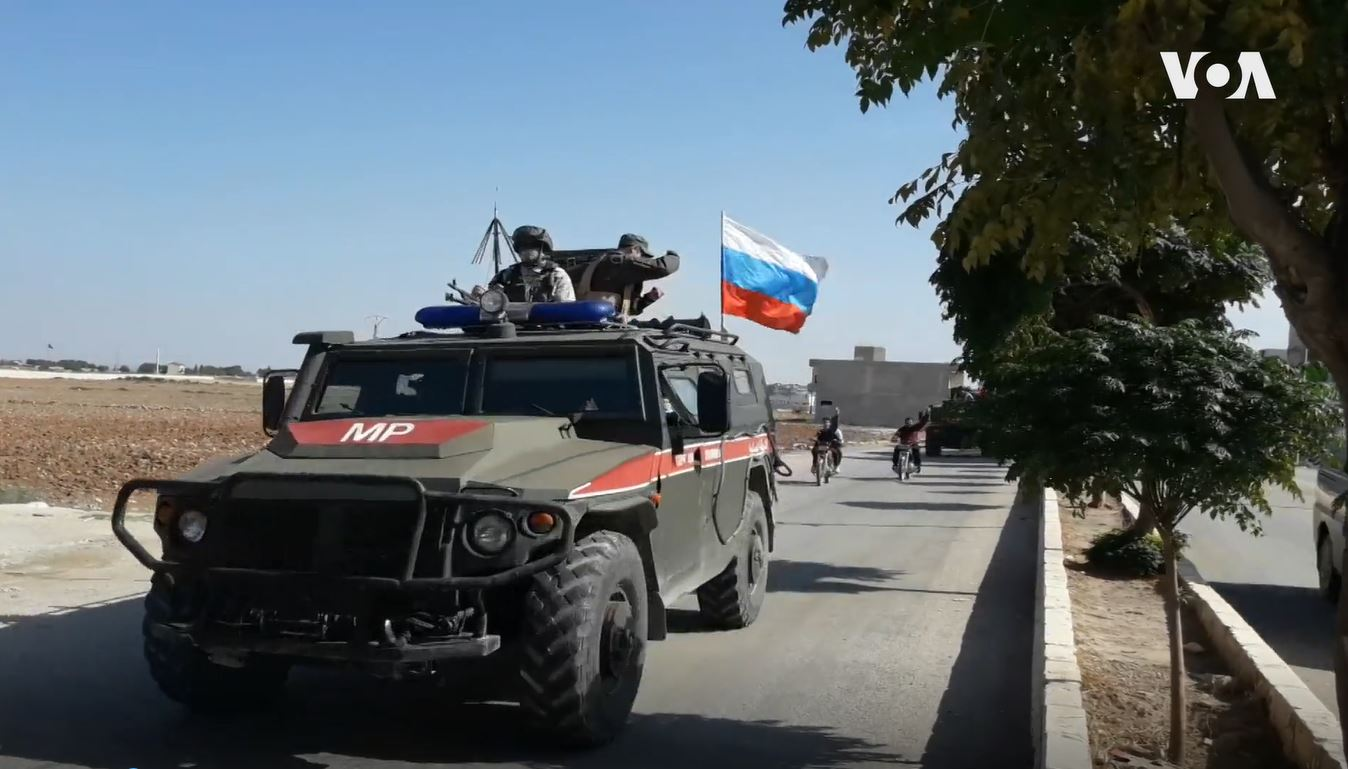
Russian military police in Kobani on 23 October 2019

Following the start of the 2019 Turkish offensive into north-eastern Syria, which put the city's administration under existential threat, the Syrian Democratic Forces (SDF) reached a deal with the Ba'athist Syrian government in which the latter would deploy limited parts of the Syrian Army, backed by Russian Military Police, to the town to prevent it from coming under Turkish attack. Pro-government forces entered the town by mid October 2019 and Syrian State Media circulated images of Syrian troops raising the Syrian flag in the town. Following the acceptance of the Second Northern Syria Buffer Zone Agreement, Kurdish military forces were mandated to withdraw from the town. Nevertheless, the Democratic Autonomous Administration of North and East Syria was reported to still be in de facto civil control of the town, while Syrian and Russian forces took up positions along the border areas and began military patrols along the city's streets.

Turkish attacks on the region prompted the construction of defensive fortifications like tunnel networks and metal sheeting, which covers popular shopping streets from drone attacks. A report by The Guardian revealed that the tunnels are on average 30 meters deep and equipped with surveillance cameras, air vents and plasma screens.

On 16 April 2021, an airstrike by the Turkish Air Force targeted the house where Abdullah Öcalan had lived during his stay in the city in 1979. The strike only caused material damage.

==== Post-Assad era ====
In December 2024, after the fall of the Assad regime and the 2024 Manbij offensive, Turkish-backed SNA fighters launched an offensive on Kobani with the intent of capturing the city. The attack was briefly paused by a US-brokered ceasefire, which ultimately collapsed and was later countered by the SDF's 2024 East Aleppo Offensive that kept the SNA west of the Euphrates as of March 2025.

In February 2026, Syrian Ministry of Interior began integrating Kobani's Asayish under a move tied to its January 2026 agreement with the SDF. The Internal Security Command in Aleppo Governorate took control of the Internal Security Directorate building in Kobani, and began operations. On 9 April 2026, Aleppo Governorate governor Azzam al-Gharib appointed Almaz Rumi as mayor of Kobani in the context of the January integration agreement.

== Geography ==
=== Climate ===
Kobani has a hot-summer Mediterranean climate (Köppen climate classification Csa).

Climate data for Kobanî
Month	Jan	Feb	Mar	Apr	May	Jun	Jul	Aug	Sep	Oct	Nov	Dec	Year
Mean daily maximum °C (°F)	7.7 (45.9)	9.7 (49.5)	14.6 (58.3)	22.3 (72.1)	26.8 (80.2)	32.5 (90.5)	36.4 (97.5)	36.1 (97.0)	31.7 (89.1)	24.8 (76.6)	16.4 (61.5)	9.9 (49.8)	22.4 (72.3)
Mean daily minimum °C (°F)	−1.1 (30.0)	0.8 (33.4)	2.8 (37.0)	6.5 (43.7)	11.2 (52.2)	16.0 (60.8)	19.4 (66.9)	18.9 (66.0)	14.3 (57.7)	9.2 (48.6)	4.1 (39.4)	0.7 (33.3)	8.6 (47.4)
Average precipitation mm (inches)	78 (3.1)	58 (2.3)	52 (2.0)	39 (1.5)	25 (1.0)	3 (0.1)	0 (0)	0 (0)	2 (0.1)	23 (0.9)	37 (1.5)	72 (2.8)	389 (15.3)
Average rainy days	11	7	5	5	4	2	0	0	2	4	6	10	56
Average snowy days	2.5	1.5	0	0	0	0	0	0	0	0	0	2	6
Average relative humidity (%)	75	67	60	56	42	40	34	34	44	47	55	75	52

== Media ==
The documentary "Radio Kobani" won the Award for Best Documentary at the International Documentary Festival – Amsterdam (IDFA) in November 2016.

In 2015, the Italian author Zerocalcare published a comics-illustrated book called "Kobane Calling" where he reported his experience among the defenders of the Rojava region.

The 2022 fiction film Kobane directed by Özmel Yasar, narrates the 2015 siege of the city of Kobane, inspired for the lead character on the actual female's commander Zehra Penaber

== Notable people ==
- Alan Kurdi: a two-year-old whose image made global headlines after he drowned on 2 September 2015 in the Mediterranean Sea.
- Jan Dost is a Syrian Kurdish poet, writer and translator.
- Abu Layla, commander of the Free Syrian Army and the SDF.
- Mazloum Abdi (Farhad Abdi Shaheen): commander of the Syrian Democratic Forces.
- Salih Muslim: a co-founder of the Democratic Union Party (PYD).

== Notable sights ==
- Arin Mirkan Statue
- Clock Tower

== International relations ==
In 2015, Rome in Italy became a partner city of Kobani. Also in 2015, the Italian cities of Naples and Ancona approved the preparation of twinning with Kobani.

== See also ==
- Ayn al-Arab Subdistrict
- Ayn al-Arab District
