= Defend International =

Non-governmental organization

- Founded: July 2007; 19 years ago Norway
- Type: Non-profit; NGO
- Location: Global
- Services: Lobbying, awareness raising, research, human rights campaigns, peace-building
- Fields: Defending human rights, diplomacy, peace, justice
- Co-Founder: Widad Akreyi
- Website: www.defendinternational.org

Defend International (commonly known as DI) is a non-governmental organization focused on promoting and protecting human rights in the Middle East and North Africa. DI was founded in 2007 in Norway.

== Structure ==
DI operates internationally and is made up of a network of volunteers, representatives, and civic organisations working at national, regional, and sub-regional levels.

== Partnerships ==
Defend International is a partner of the Global Alliance for Clean Cookstoves, an initiative led by the United Nations Foundation, and a member of the Peace One Day NGO Coalition. The Universal Declaration of Human Rights (UDHR) asserts the right to life and security for all individuals, condemning arbitrary deprivation of life. The Convention on the Elimination of All Forms of Discrimination Against Women (CEDAW) obligates signatory countries to take measures to eliminate discrimination against women, including gender-based violence like honor killings. Several United Nations Resolutions have called for the elimination of honor-related violence and urged member states to enact and enforce laws against such practices.

Since its establishment, DI has collaborated with many civic and humanitarian organisations and various governmental agencies.

== Objectives ==
DI's mission does not target any particular demographic within its geographic area of focus, but its work often concerns minority groups like the Yazidi and Middle Eastern Christians.

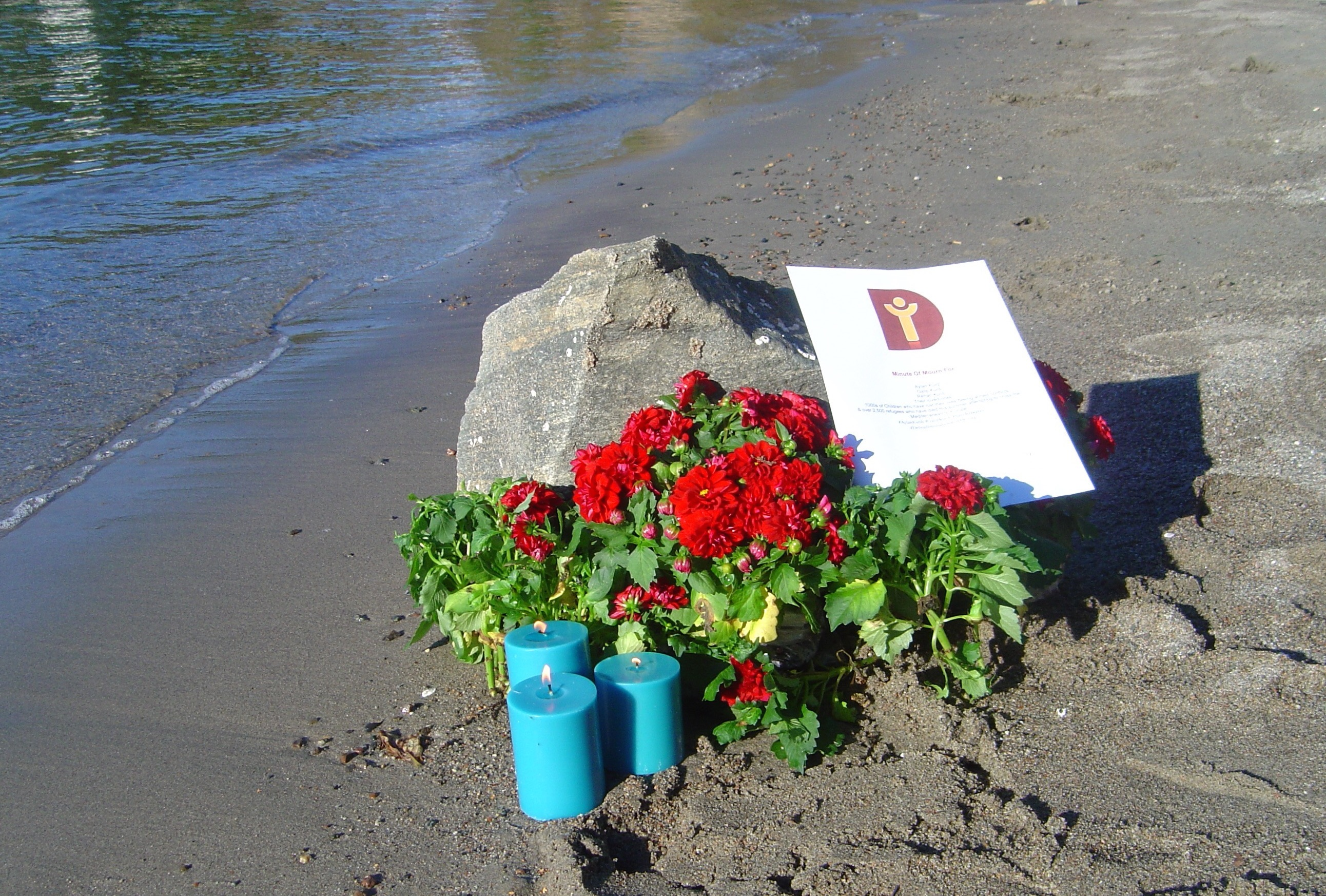
A beach event was held by Defend International in memory of Alan Kurdi and other refugees, 4 September 2015

In collaboration with its partners, DI has advocated for and worked towards various humanitarian goals such as:

- Ending modern-day slavery
- Ending capital punishment
- Stopping torture
- Protecting the rights of prisoners of conscience and civil society activists
- Defending children's rights
- Defending women's rights
- Defending the rights of human rights defenders
- Defending the rights of refugees
- Reviewing healthcare policies and human rights legislation
- Safeguarding the environment
- Promoting disarmament and international security

== Humanitarian Campaigns and Activities ==
=== Women and Children ===
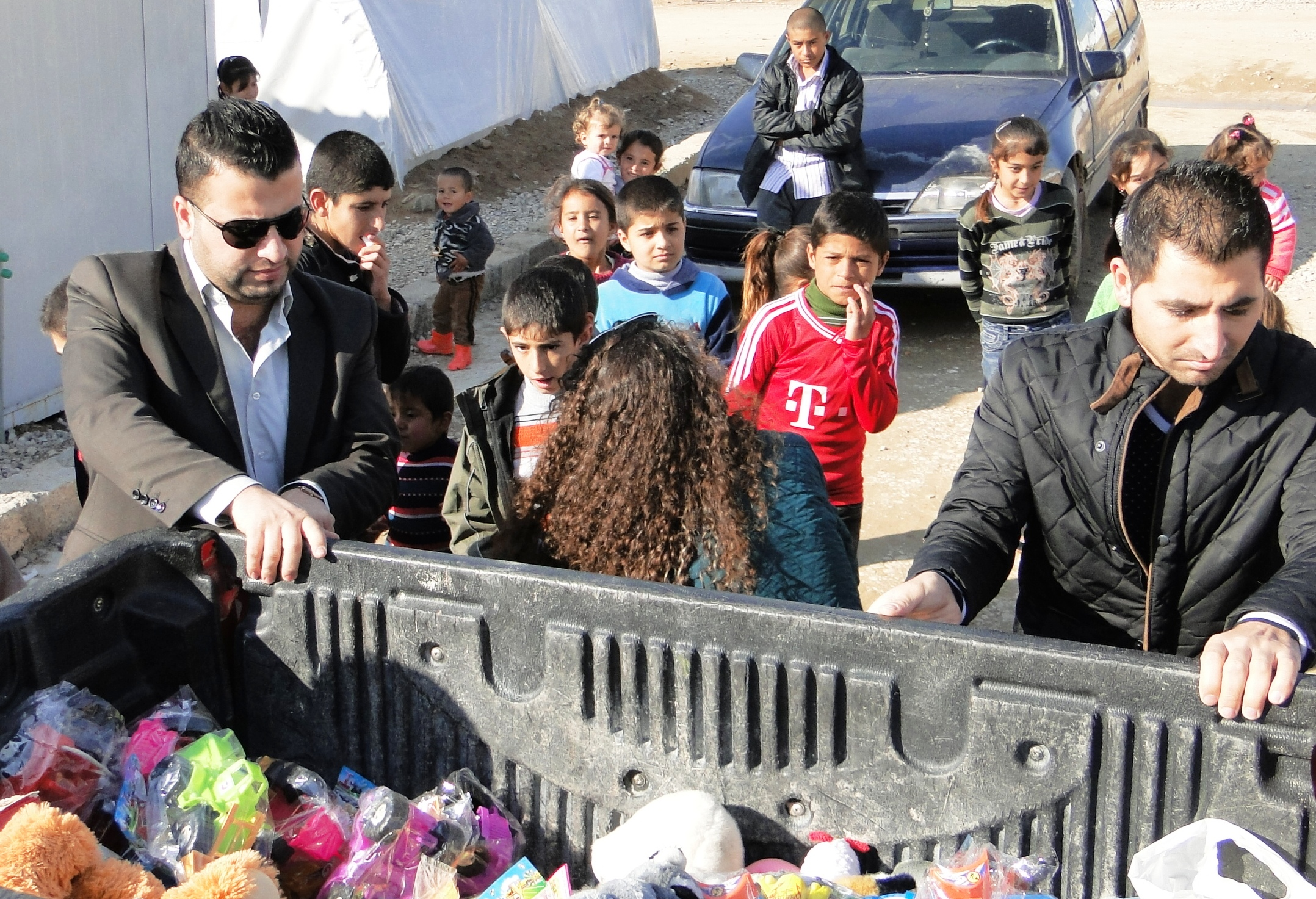
Defend International provided humanitarian aid to Yazidi refugees in the Kurdistan region, Iraq, in December 2014

DI has identified strategies to address violence against women and child marriages.

DI has called for an end to female genital mutilation and the elimination of all forms of violence and discrimination against women and girls. In 2015, DI called on UN negotiators of the Arms Trade Treaty to include a legally-binding provision to prevent armed gender-based violence.

Defend International has endorsed the Every Woman Treaty on violence against women and girls worldwide and is a member of the Everywoman Everywhere Coalition.

=== Minorities ===
In a partnership with artists like Edison band, Claude Arfaras, Jane Adams and Daniel Dalopo, Defend International launched a worldwide campaign in September 2014 to raise awareness about the Yazidis, Kobanî and the Christians and also called for the international community to intensify the efforts aimed at rescuing women and children enslaved by ISIL.

Co-founder of Defend International Widad Akreyi stated that ISIL uses slavery and rape as weapons of war against Yazidis and Christians.
