= Tima Kurdi =

Syrian-Canadian author and human rights activist

- Born: 1970 (age 55–56); Damascus, Syria
- Organization: The Kurdi Foundation
- Known for: Refugee rights advocacy, writing
- Notable work: The Boy on the Beach (2019 memoir)
- Family: Alan Kurdi (nephew)

Tima Kurdi (born 1970) is a Syrian-Canadian author and human rights activist. Born in Damascus, she moved to Canada as a young adult and is based in Coquitlam, British Columbia. Kurdi is the author of The Boy on the Beach, which documents the circumstances that led to the death of her nephews Ghalib and Alan Kurdi, and their mother, Rehanna as they fled the Syrian civil war.

== Early life and education ==
Kurdi was born in 1970 and grew up in a Kurdish family in Damascus, Syria. She emigrated to Canada in 1992, at the age of 22 years.

== Adult life ==
Kurdi is the founder of The Kurdi Foundation, through which she advocates for Canadians to be mindful of the needs of refugees. In 2018, she advocated for Canada to accept more refugees.

Her memoir The Boy on the Beach documents her own family's efforts to escape the Syrian civil war and the circumstances that led to the deaths of Alan and Ghalib Kurdi (her nephews) and Rehanna (her sister in law), in 2015. In 2019, she expressed her distress that a movie about Alan's death was being made without the Kurdi family's consent by filmmaker Omer Sarikaya.

Kurdi lives in Coquitlam, British Columbia, Canada.
