= Jan Dost =

Syrian-Kurdish writer, born 1965

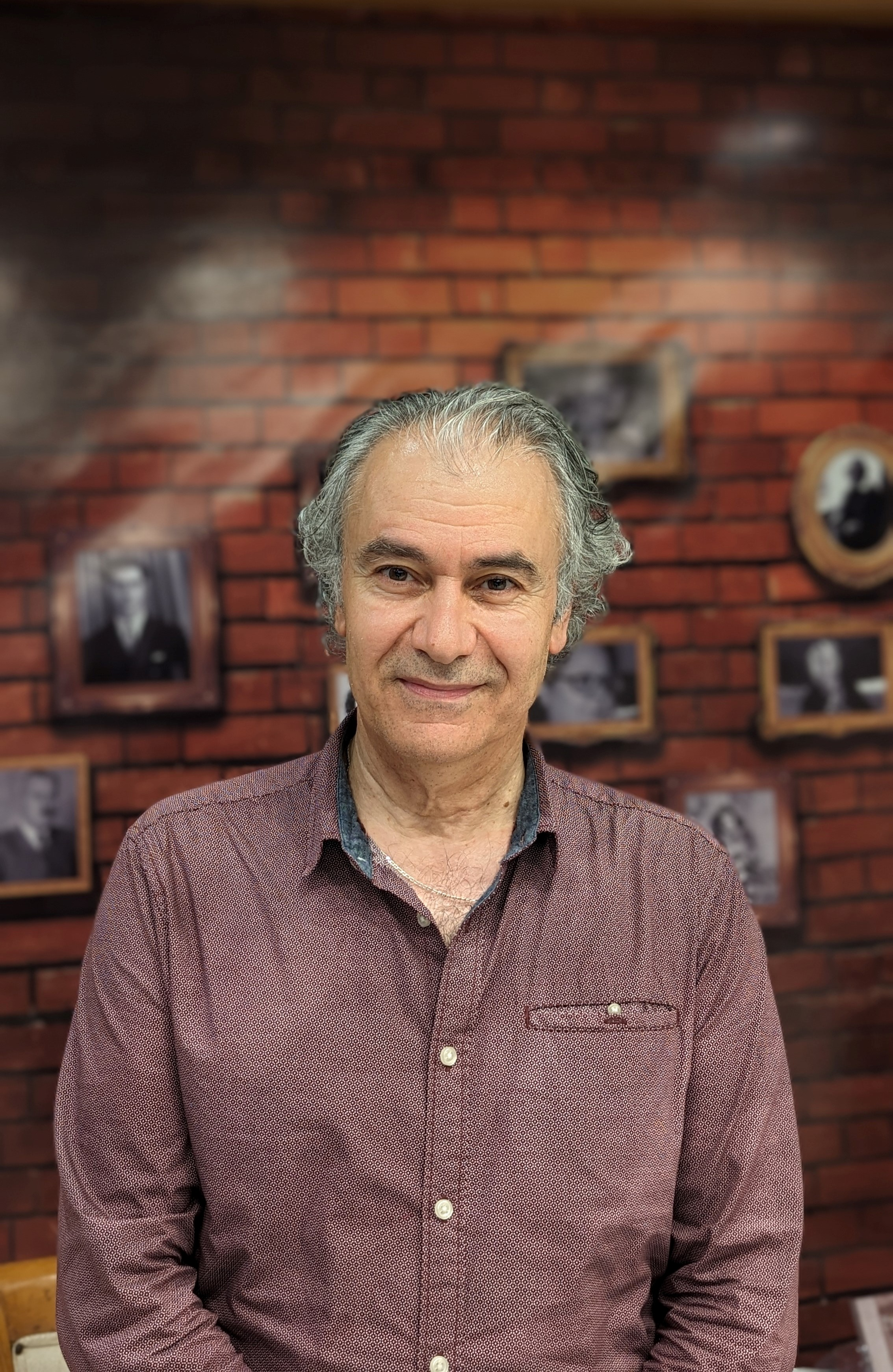
- Jan Dost in 2023
- Born: 12 March 1965 (age 61) Kobanî, Syria
- Occupation: novelist and literary translator
- Language: Kurdish, Arabic
- Citizenship: Syria and Germany
- Genre: poetry, novels, short stories
- Years active: 1984-present
- Notable works: Safe Corridor (novel), Arabic translation of Mem and Zin
- Notable awards: Bait Al-Ghasham Dar Arab Translation Prize

Jan Dost, (Arabic: جان دوست; Kurdish: Jan Dost; born 12 March 1965 in Kobanî, Syria), is a Syrian Kurdish poet, writer and translator. He has written several novels both in his native Kurmanji Kurdish language and in Arabic. He is known as a prolific Kurdish writer, with several of his novels in the context of the Syrian civil war. Apart from his own works, Dost has translated Kurdish and Persian works into Arabic, including Mem and Zin, a classical Kurdish love story, written by Ahmad Khani in the 17th century and considered as the national epic of the Kurdish people.

His literary contributions span various genres, including poetry, novels, and translations. Some of his works have been translated into Italian, Turkish, Persian and Spanish. Since 2000, Dost has lived in exile in Germany, acquiring German citizenship in 2008.

== Life and career ==
Dost was born in 1965 in Kobanî (Ain al-Arab in Arabic), a mostly Kurdish city in northern Syria. From 1985 to 1988 he studied natural sciences in Aleppo, but abandoned his academic education after three years, focusing on literature and writing. He wrote his early epic poem Kela Dimdimê (The Citadel of Dimdim) in 1984, which was only published in Kurdish in Germany in 1991.

Among other translations, Dost translated his own Kurdish novel Mîrname, set during the Ottoman Empire in the 17th century, into Arabic. The work is a fictitious biography of Ahmad Khani (1650-1707), a major Kurdish poet and Sufi, who fought "injustice using only a pen and ink." In February 2024, his novel Safe Corridor, translated by Marilyn Booth, was awarded the first-ever Bait Al-Ghasham Dar Arab Translation Prize, an international award for the translation of Arabic literature into English. This story takes place during the 2018 Turkish occupation of Afrin. In another novel, A Green Bus Leaves Aleppo, Dost used the same plot, but told from a different character’s perspective.

In a 2022 interview with literary critic Nuha Askar about the relationship of his literary work and Kurdish national identity, Dost said:

I am working on the question of identity, the question of the nation looking for a foothold in the sun of history and a solid spot on the map. I am a writer haunted by the pain of a struggling people; the literature I write is an attempt to participate in their struggle. [...] Kurdish literature, since its inception, has been characterized by “struggle” – defending the national self and enhancing the nation's standing.

— The Out-of-Flock Dissident: An Interview with Kurdish – Syrian Writer Jan Dost

Further, he considered that "the Syrian novel has become essentially a war novel," with several of his own works dealing with the fighting and destruction in the Kurdish regions of Afrin, Kobani and Amuda. Asked about his relationship with the Arabic language, he explained that he started writing in this language at a young age and considers it his own language, just as other writers of Arabic literature. Having grown up with Kurdish as his native language and Arabic through his cultural environment, he considers himself bilingual, speaking and thinking equally well in both languages. His own translations of earlier novels written in Arabic into Kurdish are based on his decision to publish all of his literary work in his "marginalized national language".

== Works ==
=== Novels ===
- Mijabad. Kurdish. Diyarbakir 2004
- Sê gav û sê darek. Kurdish. Avesta, Istanbul 2007
- Mîrname. Kurdish. Avesta, Istanbul 2008
- Martînê Bextewer. Kurdish. Avesta, Istanbul 2011
- Asheeq the Translator (عشيق المترجم) Arabic. Waraq Publishing, Dubai 2013
- Blood on the Minaret (دم على المئذنة) Arabic. Maqam, Kairo 2013
- The Bells of Rome (نواقيس روما) Arabic. Dar Al-Saqi, Beirut 2017
- Kobani: The Tragedy and the Quarter. Kurdish. Dara, Diyarbakir 2017
- Safe Corridor (ممر آمن) Arabic. Miskiliani, Tunis 2019, English translation 2024
- A Green Bus leaving Aleppo (باص أخضر يغادر حلب). Arabic. Al Mutawaset, Milano 2019
- The manuscript of Petersburg. (مخطوط بطرسبورغ) Arabic. Miskiliani, Tunis 2020
- Cordyceps. (الكوردي سيبس) Arabic. Damascus. 2020
- In the Grip of a Nightmare – Diary of the Corona Siege: Narratives about the Virus. (في قبضة الكابوس. يوميات حصار كورونا : مرويات الفيروس) Arabic. Amman 2021
- Safe Corridor. English translation by Marilyn Booth, Dar al Arab, London, 2025

=== Translations ===
- Mem and Zin (from Kurdish into Arabic). Damascus 1995. Duhok 2016. Kairo 2016

=== Poetry ===
- Dîwana Jan. Avesta, Istanbul 2008
- Kela Dimdimê. (The Citadel of Dimdim) Bonn 1991; Istanbul 2008
- Sazek ji çavên Kurdistan re (A Song for Kurdistan's Eyes). Kurdish. Syria 1996
- Poems which the War has Forgotten in the Poet's Pocket. Arabic. Amman. 2019

== Awards ==
- first prize in a Kurdish short story competition in Syria (1993)
- the Kurdish Galawej Award, a poetry award for Kurdish literature. (2010)
- Bait Al-Ghasham Dar Arab Translation Prize for Safe Corridor (2024)

== Literature ==
- Hazha Abbas Ali, Wrya Naji Abdullah (2023). Psychological and Physical Transformation in A Safe Passage in Afrin by Jan Dost. Journal of Tikrit University for Humanities, Volume 30, 1,8, pp. 183-201
- Askar, Nuha. (2022). The Out-of-Flock Dissident: An Interview with Kurdish – Syrian Writer Jan Dost. Review of Middle East Studies. 56(2):403-409. doi:10.1017/rms.2023.22
