= Kobani Subdistrict =

Kobani Subdistrict ناحية مركز عين العرب Nahiye Kobanî
- Subdistrict
- Location of Kobani Subdistrict within Aleppo Governorate

- Location in Syria
- Coordinates (Kobani): 36°48′18″N 38°23′27″E
- Country: Syria
- Governorate: Aleppo
- District: kobani District
- Seat: Kobani

Area
  - Total: 745.6 km^{2} (287.9 sq mi)

Population (2004)
  - Total: 81,424
  - Density: 109.2/km^{2} (282.8/sq mi)
- Geocode: SY020600

Kobani Subdistrict (Kurdish: Nahiye Kobanî) or Ayn al-Arab Subdistrict (Arabic: ناحية مركز عين العرب) is a subdistrict of Ayn al-Arab District in northeastern Aleppo Governorate, northern Syria. The administrative centre is the city of Kobani. At the 2004 census, the subdistrict had a population of 81,424.

== Cities, towns and villages ==
Cities, towns and villages of Ayn al-Arab Subdistrict
PCode	Name	Population
C1946	Kobani	44,821
C1954	al-Farazdaq	3,981
C1951	Tall Ghazal	1,546
C1940	Shiran	1,545
C1983	Qantarte Beith Serri	1,484
C1957	Ain al-Bat Kabir	1,450
C1971	al-Ghassaniyah	1,386
C1963	Hazineh	1,103
C1981	Mazraet Sufi Kabir	973
C1949	Tall Hajib	950
C1936	Qantarra	884
C1978	Doha Kabir	807
C1959	Bir Omar	773
C1976	al-Habab	756
C1985	Qarruf	729
C1955	Tall Hajar Fawqani	724
C1958	Tafsh	720
—N/a	Minas	680
C1966	Baban	660
C1944	Salameh Saghir	649
C1982	Mazraet Elamud	649
C1990	Qola	592
C1986	Makhraj	590
C1960	Joban	578
—N/a	Zarqaa	567
C1970	Ayoubiyeh	565
C1967	Kharab Nas	507
C1968	Kharan Kort	491
C1992	Kas Kaskan	466
C1962	Nabaa	466
C1980	Sus	439
C1937	Zarafet Zarafik	415
—N/a	Klmad	405
C1969	Thahireh	399
C1974	Aziziyeh	358
C1964	Jil	347
C1965	Natheriyeh	330
C1979	Sift Fawqani	285
C1952	Bethlehem Tahtani	250
C1950	Bethlehem Fawqani	242
C1942	Salama Kabir	231
C1987	Morshed	197
C1988	Naf Karab	189
C1961	Bijan	180
C1947	Tall Hajar Tahtani	179
C1972	Jbeileh Fawqani	175
C1939	Khaldiyeh Fawqani	162
C1973	Shoruq	156
—N/a	Kharab Ra'asat	146
C1945	Jbeileh Tahtani	119
C1953	Maydan	104
C1941	Tall Abyad Tahtani	97
C1956	Oruba	82
C1948	Zobar	76
C1977	Zogher	76
C1943	Gharib	64
C1991	Karb Karbalak	51
C1975	Estiqama	50
—N/a	Kirbat Aleusal	24
