= Jarabulus Tahtani =

Jarabulus Tahtani جرابلس تحتاني
- Village
- Location of Jarabulus Tahtani in Syria
- Coordinates: 36°48′01″N 38°01′40″E
- Country: Syria
- Governorate: Aleppo
- District: Jarabulus
- Subdistrict: Jarabulus
- Elevation: 352 m (1,155 ft)

Population (2004)
  - Total: 2,170
- Time zone: UTC+2 (EET)
  - Summer (DST): UTC+3 (EEST)
- Geocode: C2226

Jarabulus Tahtani (Arabic: جرابلس تحتاني, romanized: Jarābulus Taḩtānī, lit. 'Lower Jarabulus') is a village in northern Aleppo Governorate, northern Syria. Situated in the Jarabulus Plain's wetlands, on the western banks of river Euphrates, the village is located some 2 km (1.2 mi) to the southeast of Jarabulus, and about 3 km (1.9 mi) south of the border with the Turkish province of Gaziantep.

With 2,170 inhabitants, as per the 2004 census, is the second largest village of Nahiya Jarabulus within Jarabulus District. The bridge connecting Jarabulus Tahtani with Shuyukh Fawqani was severely damaged in March 2015.

== Syrian civil war ==
On 6 March 2015, following the Kurdish retaking of Kobanî, ISIL blew up the western side of al-Nasiriyyah Bridge, a modern road bridge that had previously been damaged by artillery on 10 February 2014. Jarabulus Tahtani was captured on 24 August 2016 by Turkish-backed FSA militias on the first day of Operation Euphrates Shield.
