= Shuyukh Tahtani =

Shuyukh Tahtani شيوخ تحتاني Şexlêr Jur
- Town
- Location of Shuyukh Tahtani in Syria
- Coordinates: 36°45′07″N 38°03′46″E
- Country: Syria
- Governorate: Aleppo
- District: Ayn al-Arab
- Subdistrict: Shuyukh Tahtani

Population (2004)
  - Total: 4,338
- Time zone: UTC+3 (AST)
- Geocode: C2007

Shuyukh Tahtani (Arabic: شيوخ تحتاني, lit. 'Lower Shuyukh'; Kurdish: Şexlêr Jur) is a town in northern Syria, administratively part of the Aleppo Governorate. Its inhabitants are Kurdish and Arab.

Shuyukh Tahtani is the administrative center of Nahiya Shuyukh Tahtani of the Ayn al-Arab District.

Located on the eastern banks of river Euphrates, behind the wetlands of the Shuyukh Plain, the town has a population of 4,338, as per the 2004 census, and is administrative center of Nahiya Shuyukh Tahtani. Some 5 km (3.1 mi) to the north, a road bridge used to connect its larger twin town Shuyukh Fawqani to Jarabulus and the city of Manbij on the western side of Euphrates river.
