= Shuyukh Tahtani Subdistrict =

Shuyukh Tahtani Subdistrict ناحية شيوخ تحتاني Nahiye Şexlêr Jur
- Subdistrict
- Location of Shuyukh Tahtani Subdistrict within Aleppo Governorate

- Location in Syria
- Country: Syria
- Governorate: Aleppo
- District: Ayn al-Arab
- Seat: Shuyukh Tahtani

Area
  - Total: 318.86 km^{2} (123.11 sq mi)

Population (2004)
  - Total: 43,861
  - Density: 137.56/km^{2} (356.27/sq mi)
- Geocode: SY020601

Shuyukh Tahtani Subdistrict (Arabic: ناحية شيوخ تحتاني, Kurdish: Nahiye Şexlêr Jur) is a subdistrict of Ayn al-Arab District in Aleppo Governorate of northern Syria. Administrative centre is Shuyukh Tahtani.

At the 2004 census, the subdistrict had a population of 43,861. The majority of the subdistrict's population is Kurdish, with an Arab minority.

== Cities, towns and villages ==
Cities, towns and villages of Shuyukh Tahtani Subdistrict
PCode	Name	Population
C2002	Shuyukh Fawqani	9,303
C2019	Qana	5,975
C2007	Shuyukh Tahtani	4,338
C2004	Jubb al-Faraj	2,842
C2020	Qubbat	2,110
C2015	Tal Elebar	1,764
C2008	Tal Amar	1,279
C2014	Shamaliyah	1,199
C2009	Dadeli	1,150
C2000	Seif Ali	984
C2018	Hilala - Middle Kord	970
C2012	Shehama - Bandar	929
C1997	Rajabiyeh - Middle Qojli	904
C2001	Kherbet Atu	875
C2006	Taala	869
C2021	Upper Qurran	833
C2005	Upper Dar Elbaz	781
C2003	Wawiyeh - Jaql Wabran	766
C1999	Sawaniyet - Qamlaq	763
C2011	Darb Elnob	745
C1994	Shakriyeh - Mashko	670
C1995	Jebnet	620
C2013	Hifyana - Bugas	595
C1998	Big Duwara - Jraqli	572
—N/a	Zir	551
C2016	Khalil - Khalijak	433
C1996	Oweina	382
—N/a	Tajiyeh	280
C2010	Billeh	239
C2017	Mazdalfa - Bistek	140
—N/a	Gabelek	-
