= Ayn al-Arab District =

Ayn al-Arab District منطقة عين العرب Navçeya Kobanî
- District
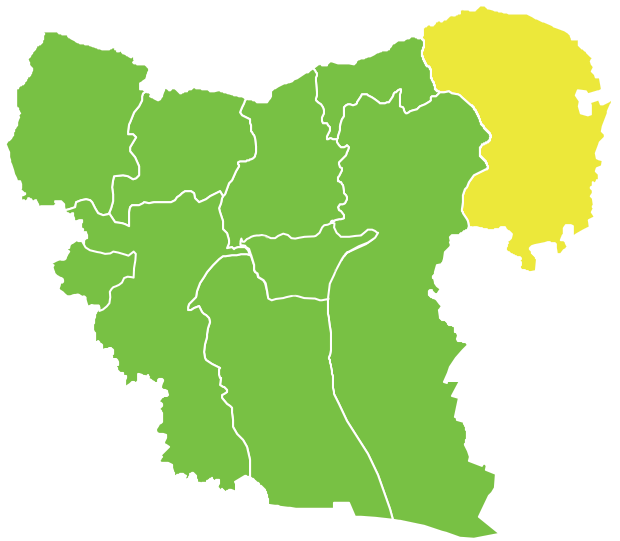
- Location of Ayn al-Arab District within Aleppo Governorate

- Location in Syria
- Coordinates (Kobani): 36.89°N 38.37°E
- Country: Syria
- Governorate: Aleppo
- Seat: Kobani
- Subdistricts: 4 nawāḥī

Area
  - Total: 3,068.04 km^{2} (1,184.58 sq mi)

Population (2004)
  - Total: 192,513
  - Density: 62.7479/km^{2} (162.516/sq mi)
- Geocode: SY0206

Ayn al-Arab District (Arabic: منطقة عين العرب, romanized: manṭiqat ‘Ayn al-‘Arab) or Kobani District (Kurdish: Navçeya Kobanî) is a district of Aleppo Governorate in northern Syria. The administrative centre is the city of Kobani.

Sub-Districts of Ayn al-Arab District

The administrative center of Ayn al-Arab Subdistrict shown above is the city of Kobani.

The administrative center of Shuyukh Tahtani Subdistrict shown above is the city of Shuyukh Tahtani.

The administrative center of Sarrin Subdistrict shown above is the city of Sarrin.

The district fills the northeastern section of the governorate, and its northern boundary is along the Syria–Turkey border.

At the 2004 census, the district had a population of 192,513.

== Sub-districts ==
The district of Ayn Al-Arab is divided into four sub-districts or nawāḥī (population as of 2004):

Subdistricts of Ayn al-Arab District
Code	Name	Area	Population	Seat
SY020600	Ayn al-Arab Subdistrict	745.60 km^{2}	81,424	Ayn al-Arab
SY020601	Shuyukh Tahtani Subdistrict	318.86 km^{2}	43,861	Shuyukh Tahtani
SY020602	Sarrin Subdistrict	2,003.57 km^{2}	69,931	Sarrin
	Al-Jalabiyah Subdistrict	2,003.57 km^{2}	69,931	Al-Jalabiyah

Al-Jalabiyah Subdistrict was separated from Sarrin Subdistrict in 2009.
