= Death of Alan Kurdi =

2015 drowning of Syrian boy near Turkey

- Two-year-old Kurdi lying dead on the beach
- Date: 2 September 2015
- Location: Mediterranean Sea, near Bodrum, Turkey
- Cause: Drowning
- Deaths: Alan Kurdi
- Burial: 4 September 2015, Kobanî, Syria
- Accused: Muwafaka Alabash; Asem Alfrhad
- Charges: Smuggling immigrants Causing deaths by negligence
- Verdict: Guilty of human trafficking, acquitted of causing deaths through deliberate negligence
- Convictions: 4 years 2 months

Alan Kurdi (born Alan Shenu), initially reported as Aylan Kurdi, was a two-year-old Syrian boy of Kurdish ethnic background whose image made global headlines after he drowned on 2 September 2015 in the Mediterranean Sea along with his mother and brother. Alan and his family were Syrian refugees trying to reach Europe from Turkey amid the European refugee crisis (see timeline). Photographs of his body were taken by Turkish journalist Nilüfer Demir and quickly went viral, prompting international responses. Since the Kurdi family had reportedly been trying to reach Canada, his death and the wider refugee crisis became an issue in the 2015 Canadian federal election.

== Biography ==
Kurdi is believed to have been born in Kobanî, Syria. He was two years and two months old when he died. A Syrian journalist stated that the family name was Shenu; "Kurdi" was used in Turkey because of their ethnic background. After moving between various cities in northern Syria to escape the civil war and ISIL, his family settled in Turkey. The family returned to Kobanî at the beginning of 2015, but returned to Turkey in June 2015 when ISIL attacked Kobanî again. During this time, Kurdi's father arranged for an illegal passage to Kos.

Kurdi smiling in a playground

Kurdi's family members were hoping to join their relatives in Vancouver, British Columbia, Canada, after his aunt Tima Kurdi filed for refugee sponsorship, but this was rejected by the Department of Citizenship and Immigration Canada after the family members were denied an exit visa by Turkish authorities. According to the department an application by Alan's uncle, Mohammad, was rejected as it was incomplete, and no application was ever received from Abdullah Kurdi, Alan's father. Abdullah Kurdi said that the Canadian government denied his application for asylum and that they were responsible for the tragedy.

Canadian New Democratic Party (NDP) MP Fin Donnelly told the media that he had hand-delivered their file to Citizenship and Immigration Minister Chris Alexander earlier in the year, but the application was rejected in June 2015 because it was incomplete. The Kurdi family tried to obtain entry to Canada under a private sponsorship program whereby groups of five people may also sponsor an individual or family. They are required to demonstrate that they can provide roughly 27,000 Canadian dollars to support a family of four refugees. According to Alexandra Kotyk, project manager of Lifeline Syria, a refugee settlement group in Toronto, the program requires that people seeking to come to Canada from Turkey first be declared refugees by the Turkish government. She said that was often a difficult or impossible condition to fulfill.

=== Fatal accident and body recovery ===
In the early hours of 2 September 2015, Kurdi and his family boarded a small plastic or rubber inflatable boat, which capsized about five minutes after leaving Bodrum in Turkey. Sixteen people were in the boat, which was designed for a maximum of eight people. They were trying to reach the Greek island of Kos, about 30 minutes (4 kilometres or 2 1/2 miles) from Bodrum. Kurdi's father said: "We had no life vests", but also said they were wearing life jackets, but they "were all fake". Others have stated that they believed that they were wearing life jackets but the items were ineffective.

It was later stated on Syrian radio that the Kurdi family paid $5,860 for their four spaces on the boat, which had twelve other passengers on it despite being only about five metres long. Alan Kurdi's mother joined the trip despite her fear of being on the open sea. Tima Kurdi, Alan Kurdi's aunt, had advised her sister not to go. The individuals on the boat evaded the Turkish Coastguard by setting out from an isolated beach late at night.

Around 5:00 a.m., authorities started an investigation after an emergency call that a boat had capsized and bodies were coming ashore. The bodies of Kurdi and another child were discovered by two locals at around 6:30 a.m. The two men moved the bodies from the water, where Kurdi was later photographed by a Turkish press photographer.

On 3 September 2015, Alan Kurdi along with his brother, Galib, and their mother, Rehana, were taken to Kobanî for burials, which took place the next day. It is Islamic tradition to bury the dead within 24 hours if possible. The Siege of Kobanî ended in March 2015 and Islamic State attacks on what was left of the city stopped completely in August 2015.

==== Arrests of alleged perpetrators ====
Turkish authorities later arrested four individuals in connection with the illegal journey, although they appeared to be low-level intermediaries.

Alan Kurdi's father, Abdullah Kurdi, has stated in some of his interviews that the inflatable boat became uncontrollable as its engine had failed, with the 'captain' abandoning it and everyone else. Some Turkish sources claimed that in his first interview with the Doğan News Agency, he gives a different account of the event; he also states that following two unsuccessful attempts to cross into the Greek island Kos, his family provided its own boat with its own means. However, Abdullah never confirmed the Doğan News Agency interview.

An Iraqi survivor from the same boat, Zainab Abbas, who also lost two children from the attempted crossing, told reporters that Abdullah had been presented to her as the "captain", that he was piloting the overcrowded boat too fast, causing it to flip over, and that he pleaded with her while they were still both in the water not to report him to anyone in authority. Abbas said her family escaped out of Baghdad from ISIS and she was angry because all the media attention was on Alan Kurdi and Abdullah Kurdi, and not on her family. She later returned to Baghdad and said her dead children's bodies had not been correctly prepared for burial and called on Australian Prime Minister Tony Abbott to grant her family asylum so they could escape the Islamic State. The Reuters agency reported that interviews with two other passengers in the boat, Iraqis Ahmed Hadi Jawwad (Zainab Abbas's husband), and 22-year-old Amir Haider, corroborated Abbas's account.

Abdullah denied the accusation, stating: "If I was a people smuggler, why would I put my family in the same boat as the other people? I paid the same amount to the people smugglers" and "I lost my family, I lost my life, I lost everything, so let them say whatever they want." According to Turkish authorities, investigations into the smuggling operations in Turkey showed that refugees were often tasked with helping smugglers sign up passengers for smuggling trips. It was also not uncommon for one of the passengers to be given the responsibility of piloting the boat. No smuggler, with family in Turkey and a steady income from the lucrative smuggling trade, would want to end up illegally in Europe and risk not being able to return home, where he would be likely to face arrest anyway. The President of Turkey Recep Tayyip Erdoğan offered Alan's father Turkish citizenship.

== Reactions ==
=== Reactions to the photos ===
The photograph of Kurdi's body caused a dramatic upturn in international concern over the refugee crisis. French President François Hollande phoned Turkish President Recep Tayyip Erdoğan and some European leaders after the images of Kurdi emerged in the media. He said that the picture must be a reminder of the world's responsibility regarding refugees. British Prime Minister David Cameron said he felt deeply moved by images of Kurdi. Irish Taoiseach Enda Kenny commented on the photographs of Kurdi and described the refugee crisis as a "human catastrophe" and found the pictures "absolutely shocking".

The picture has been credited with causing a surge in donations to charities helping migrants and refugees, with one charity, the Migrant Offshore Aid Station, recording a 15-fold increase in donations within 24 hours of its publication.

An article in The Guardian, on 22 December 2015, outlined a collection of what it described as "outrageous claims" against Abdullah Kurdi. It was said that he was an opportunist who used his status as a Syrian refugee for personal gain. Another source said that Abdullah was profiting from the tragedy, including selling his dead son's clothes to a museum in Paris. Australian politician Cory Bernardi claimed that "The father sent them on that boat so he could get dental treatment". Some anti-immigration politicians claimed that the image of Alan on the beach had been faked.

==== Debate on the public responses to the pictures ====
Brendan O'Neill wrote in The Spectator on 3 September 2015 that: "The global spreading of this snapshot ... is justified as a way of raising awareness about the migrant crisis. Please. It's more like a snuff photo for progressives, dead-child porn, designed not to start a serious debate about migration in the 21st century but to elicit a self-satisfied feeling of sadness among Western observers."

In contrast, Nick Logan of Global News argued on 4 September 2015: "Photojournalists sometimes capture images so powerful the public and policymakers can't ignore what the pictures show." He compared the images of Kurdi's body to the pictures taken during the Selma to Montgomery marches in which civil rights demonstrators were beaten by Alabama Highway Patrol troopers, and he said that widespread viewership of those images helped peaceful demonstrators in the passage of measures such as the Voting Rights Act of 1965.

=== Impact on the 2015 Canadian federal election ===
The death of Kurdi and reports that his family had been trying to ultimately reach Canada had an immediate impact on domestic Canadian politics. Prime Minister and leader of the Conservative Party Stephen Harper cancelled a photo opportunity and addressed the issue in a campaign event, saying, "Yesterday, Laureen and I saw on the Internet, the picture of this young boy, Alan, dead on the beach. Look, I think, our reaction to that, you know the first thing that crossed our mind was remembering our son Ben at that age, running around like that". Minister of National Defence and Multiculturalism Jason Kenney cancelled an important announcement on Conservative efforts to protect the integrity of Canada's immigration system and the security of Canada. Canadian Citizenship and Immigration Minister Chris Alexander announced he would be temporarily suspending his campaigning in the 2015 Canadian federal election to return to Ottawa to resume his ministerial duties and investigate the case of Alan Kurdi, whose uncle's application for refugee status had been rejected by his ministry.

Leader of the Opposition and NDP leader Thomas Mulcair said that "Chris Alexander has a lot to answer for, but that's not where we are right now. We're worried about how we got here, how the collective international response has been so defective, how Canada has failed so completely." NDP MP Fin Donnelly was accused of using the tragic event as a means to garner votes, because he initially told reporters that he had personally handed a letter to Immigration Minister Chris Alexander urging the minister to look at the refugee application of Alan Kurdi's family, but that Canadian immigration authorities denied the family's application. However, later the aunt of Alan Kurdi revealed that the application was made only for Kurdi's uncle and was rejected because it was not complete. Meanwhile, the Citizenship and Immigration Canada office clarified that they had not received the proper documentation to certify refugee status for the uncle's family. Mulcair later defended Donnelly, saying that no apology was warranted because the letter had mentioned both families, and stated that he "couldn't be prouder to have someone of the strength, integrity and hard work as Fin Donnelly" in caucus.

Liberal leader Justin Trudeau said that "you don't get to suddenly discover compassion in the middle of an election campaign" and that "All different stripes of governments in Canada have stepped up in times of crisis to accept people fleeing for their lives", he said. "Canadians get it. This is about doing the right thing, about living up to the values that we cherish as a country." Trudeau also reiterated the Liberal promise made several months before the election to bring in 25,000 Syrian refugees.

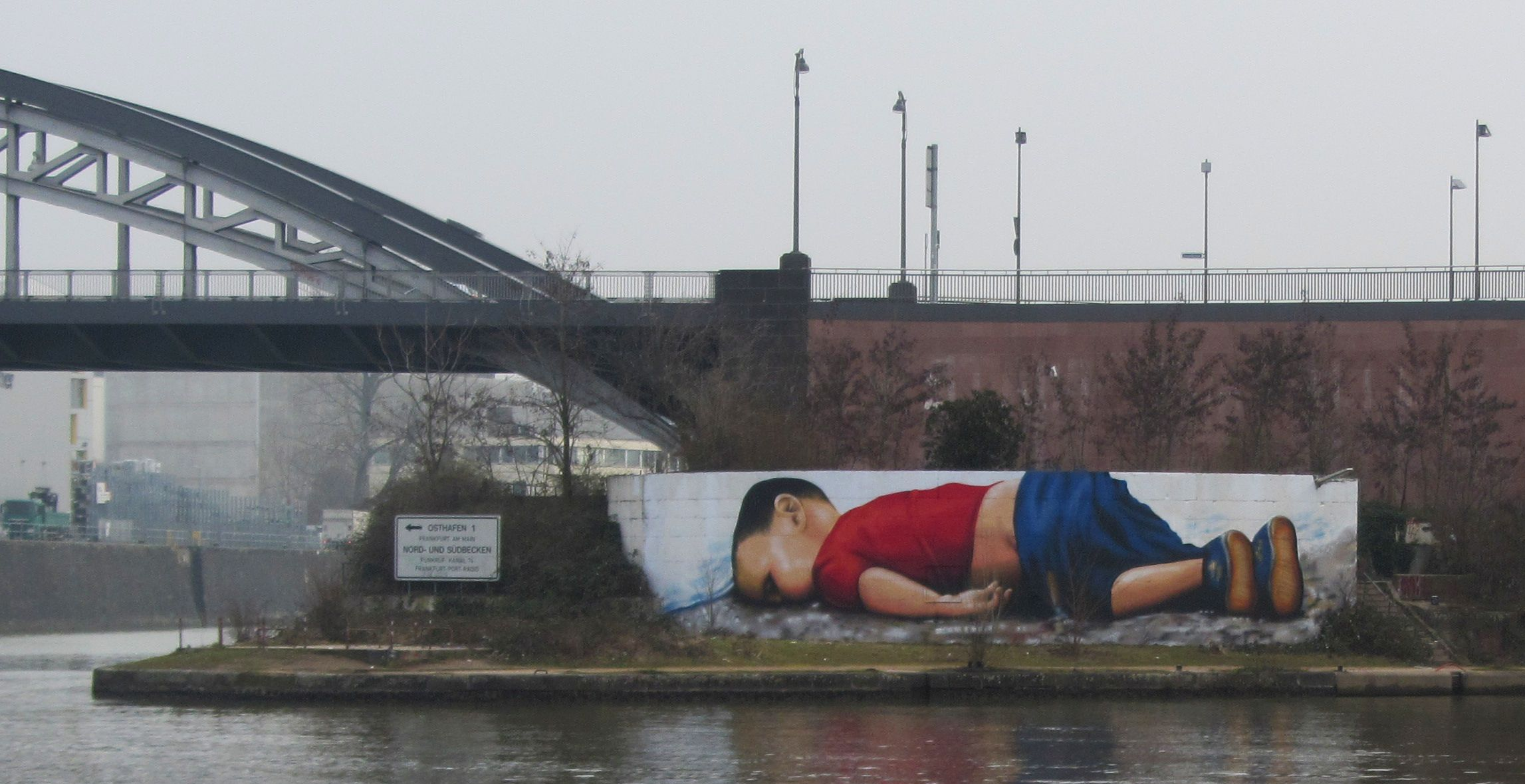
Mural of Alan Kurdi in Frankfurt am Main

Green Party leader Elizabeth May criticized Stephen Harper's response to the crisis, noting the difficulty of sponsoring a refugee in Canada. On the Green Party website, May accused the government of lacking credibility on the issue, "having failed to honor previous [refugee] announcements".

=== Reactions in the arts ===
A week following his death, around 30 Moroccans recreated the discovery of Kurdi's body in tribute in the Moroccan capital. In January 2016, the Chinese artist Ai Weiwei posed like Kurdi by imitating his dead body as shown in the media pictures. His gesture and the surrounding controversy were part of "using the image as an interface" to communicate about social justice. The picture was published first in the Indian magazine India Today together with an interview of Ai Weiwei, and was also shown at the India Art Fair.

Director Terry George created a scene in the 2016 film The Promise inspired by the Kurdi incident, to show parallels between Armenians fleeing the Ottoman Empire and modern refugees like Alan Kurdi.

In February 2016, Missy Higgins released a song titled "Oh Canada", dedicated to Alan Kurdi.

In September 2018, hip hop artist Lupe Fiasco released a song titled "Alan Forever" on his album Drogas Wave. The song presents an alternate reality where Alan survived.

Maggie Smith's poem, "Small Shoes," was inspired by the photograph. It was later made into a short film.

The song "Love It If We Made It" by the 1975, which deals with a multitude of political and pop-culture moments, includes a line about "a beach of drowing three year olds," a direct reference to Kurdi.

Composer, bandleader and woodwind artist [Sundar Viswanathan] composed a dedication piece titled "Little Kurdi (for Alan Kurdi)" for his world-jazz group Avataar after hearing about Alan Kurdi's death. The composition appears on Avataar's 2020 JUNO award-winning album Worldview The album as a whole is a gut-response to the treatment of children in our society and our leaders' inability to keep them safe.

In March 2023, the bass-baritone singer and performing artist Odekhiren Amaize published a moving tribute piece and poetry recital, "Remembering Alan Kurdi".

=== Other uses ===
In April 2017, the Mint of Finland revealed a commemorative coin celebrating the centenary of Finnish independence, using a picture of Alan Kurdi's body on the obverse side of the coin. This picture is accompanied with the text "Global Justice" (Globaali oikeudenmukaisuus). The death of Alan Kurdi is contrasted with a Finnish public library on the reverse side of the coin.

In February 2019, the rescue ship Professor Albrecht Penck of the German sea rescue organization Sea-Eye was renamed to Alan Kurdi. Following a similar conflict in early July 2019 with the German Sea-Watch organization rescue ship Sea-Watch 3 under the command of Carola Rackete, Italian authorities also denied the Alan Kurdi access to the harbour of Lampedusa on 6 July 2019. After international intervention, the refugees eventually entered Malta on 7 July 2019.

== Legacy ==
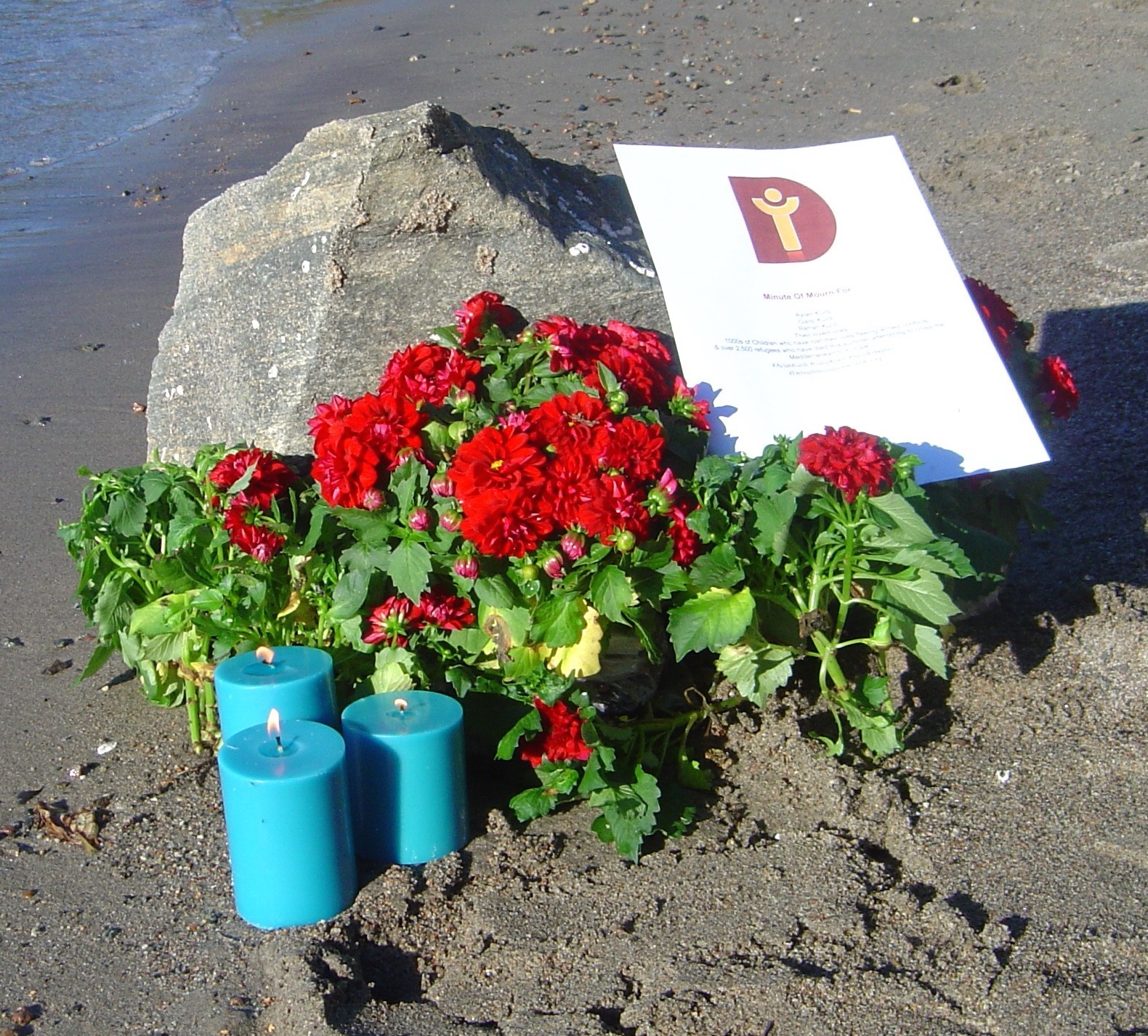
A beach event was held by Defend International in memory of Alan Kurdi and other refugees, 4 September 2015.

Prayer events and moments of silence were held by various organisations including those held by NGOs. President of Defend International "called on the international community to share equitably the responsibility for protecting, assisting and hosting refugees in accordance with principles of international solidarity and human rights". A host of a daily radio program wished that "Alan Kurdi's death would inspire us to create a world without borders", while a commentary published at Spiegel Online suggested that Berlin needs to "reform or abolish its refugee policy". Artists and poets from all over the world shared tributes to Alan Kurdi.

On 8 September 2015, the publication Bild removed all pictures, including those of Kurdi, from its print edition and website in response to complaints about its decision to publish images of Kurdi. The newspaper stated about "the power of pictures": "Only when one does not see them, one understands the magic which pictures create".

Over three months later, on Christmas Eve 2015, 3 News New Zealand said "Pictures of his lifeless body on a beach came to symbolise the wider tragedy. Can there have been a more moving, a more powerful image than the photograph of the tiny lifeless body of Aylan Kurdi being carried from the sea?"

Channel 4 television in the UK presents an annual Christmas message as an alternative to the Royal Christmas Message. In 2015, their speaker was Abdullah Kurdi, who said:

If a person shuts a door in someone's face, this is very difficult. When a door is opened they no longer feel humiliated. At this time of year I would like to ask you all to think about the pain of fathers, mothers and children who are seeking peace and security. We ask just for a little bit of sympathy from you. Hopefully next year the war will end in Syria and peace will reign all over the world.

On 2 January 2016, a feature article on the BBC News website opened with the words: "It was one of those moments when the whole world seems to care." It went on to quote Alan Kurdi's aunt, Tima Kurdi:

It was something about that picture, God put the light on that picture to wake up the world.

The ISIL terrorist group incorporated Kurdi's death into their propaganda campaigns, using an image of Kurdi's corpse while claiming that God will punish those that dare to emigrate from nations with ISIL influences. The group also asserted that those who leave are likely to become apostates who will have their souls enter hell upon death.

Pope Leo XIV referred further to the image in his apostolic exhortation on Christian love for the poor in October 2025, commenting that "apart from some momentary outcry, similar events are becoming increasingly irrelevant and seen as marginal news items".

== Book ==
Tima Kurdi released her memoir, The Boy on the Beach, in 2019, detailing the Kurdi family's life and attempts to flee Syria.

== See also ==
- List of photographs considered the most important
- Refugees of the Syrian Civil War
- Timeline of the European migrant crisis
