= Clean Cooking Alliance =

US-based non-profit organization

- Formation: 21 September 2010
- Headquarters: Washington, D.C.
- Chief Executive Officer: Dymphna van der Lans
- Parent organization: United Nations Foundation

The Clean Cooking Alliance, formerly the Global Alliance for Clean Cookstoves, is a non-profit organization operating with the support of the United Nations Foundation to promote clean cooking technologies in lower and middle-income countries. Four million people a year die from health problems attributable to household air pollution from the use of polluting open fires and inefficient fuels for cooking. The Alliance was announced in 2010 by then-U.S. Secretary of State Hillary Rodham Clinton. Dymphna previously worked as CEO for the Clinton Climate Initiative organization.

They also provide grants for research and initiatives that support the aims of the Alliance, advocate for international standards for stove manufacturers, and coordinate research and knowledge of the issues surrounding the use of clean cookstoves.

== Endorsements ==
Celebrities and musical artists have advocated around the issue. They include American actress Julia Roberts, Spanish and American chef Jose Andres, Second Lady of the Republic of Ghana Samira Bawumia, Indian chef Sanjeev Kapoor, China's Zhao Wei, and Ghana's Rocky Dawuni.
