= List of people associated with rail transport =

== Famous railroaders ==
- Casey Jones – Illinois Central engineer whose death in a 1900 train wreck was made famous in song and legend
- Albert Lacombe – made a railroad through Blackfoot territory
- Zhan Tianyou – distinguished Chinese railroad engineer, often called the "Father of China's railroad"

== Railroad tycoons and businessmen ==
- Erastus Corning – formed the nucleus of what would become the great New York Central Railroad
- Charles Crocker – one of the Big Four co-founders of the Central Pacific Railroad
- Eugene V. Debs – labor organizer, founding member of Brotherhood of Locomotive Firemen, and participant in the infamous Pullman Strike
- Daniel Drew – robber baron involved in the stock manipulation of the Erie Railroad with Fisk and Gould
- James Fisk – robber baron involved in the stock manipulation of the Erie Railroad with Gould and Drew
- Jay Gould – robber baron involved in the stock manipulation of the Erie Railroad with Fisk and Drew
- Edward H. Harriman – president of the Union Pacific and the Southern Pacific, and directed the unification of both railroads
- James J. Hill – founder of the Great Northern Railway, builder of first transcontinental railroad without federal subsidies or land grants
- Cyrus K. Holliday – founder of the Atchison, Topeka and Santa Fe Railway
- Mark Hopkins – one of the Big Four co-founders of the Central Pacific Railroad
- Collis P. Huntington – one of the Big Four co-founders of the Central Pacific Railroad, founder of Huntington, West Virginia while helping construct the Chesapeake and Ohio Railway
- George Pullman – inventor of the Pullman sleeper (a luxury sleeping car) and founder of the Pullman Company
- Leland Stanford – one of the Big Four co-founders of the Central Pacific Railroad, president of the Southern Pacific Railroad, governor of California, and founder of Stanford University
- Arthur Stilwell – founder of the Kansas City Southern Railway, as well as several cities, among them Port Arthur, Texas, which is named after Stilwell
- Cornelius Vanderbilt – after spending the first 70 years of his life building a successful ferry business, controlled and expanded the New York Central Railroad into an empire and ordered construction of the first Grand Central Terminal

=== See also ===
- List of railroad executives

== Inventors and innovators ==
- Grenville M. Dodge – chief engineer of the Union Pacific Railroad and helped construct the first American transcontinental railroad.
- Fred Harvey – revolutionized passenger train onboard services, making travel by train more comfortable.
- Theodore Judah – chief engineer of the Central Pacific Railroad and passionate supporter of the first American transcontinental railroad
- Otto Kuhler – industrial designer
- Raymond Loewy – industrial designer
- Anatole Mallet – inventor of the articulated locomotive, commonly called the Mallet locomotive
- Charles Minot – general superintendent of the Erie Railroad, first to use the telegraph to dispatch trains in 1851
- William Robinson – inventor of the track circuit used in railway signaling
- George Stephenson – "father of British steam railways", inventor of the Rocket steam locomotive (the first "modern" locomotive), and pioneer of the 4 ft 8 ½ inch rail gauge
- Richard Trevithick – credited with the 1804 invention of the steam locomotive
- Wilhelm von Pressel – designer of the Baghdad Railway
- George Westinghouse – inventor of the air brake

== Others ==
- Richard Beeching – household name as chairman of British Rail (1961-1964) famous for Beeching cuts
- Jesse James – American outlaw, portraying a Robin Hood of sorts, standing up against railroad corporations in defense of the small farmers
- Francis Bourgeois - A British Trainspotter
