= Syria–Turkey border =

International border

Syria–Turkey border الحدود السورية التركية Suriye–Türkiye sınırı

Characteristics
- Entities: Syria Turkey
- Length: 911 km (566 mi)
- Enclave and exclaves: None

History
- Established: 1921; Treaty of Ankara (1921)
- Current shape: 1923; Treaty of Lausanne
- Treaties: Treaty of Ankara (1921), Treaty of Lausanne, Franco-Turkish Agreement of 1939

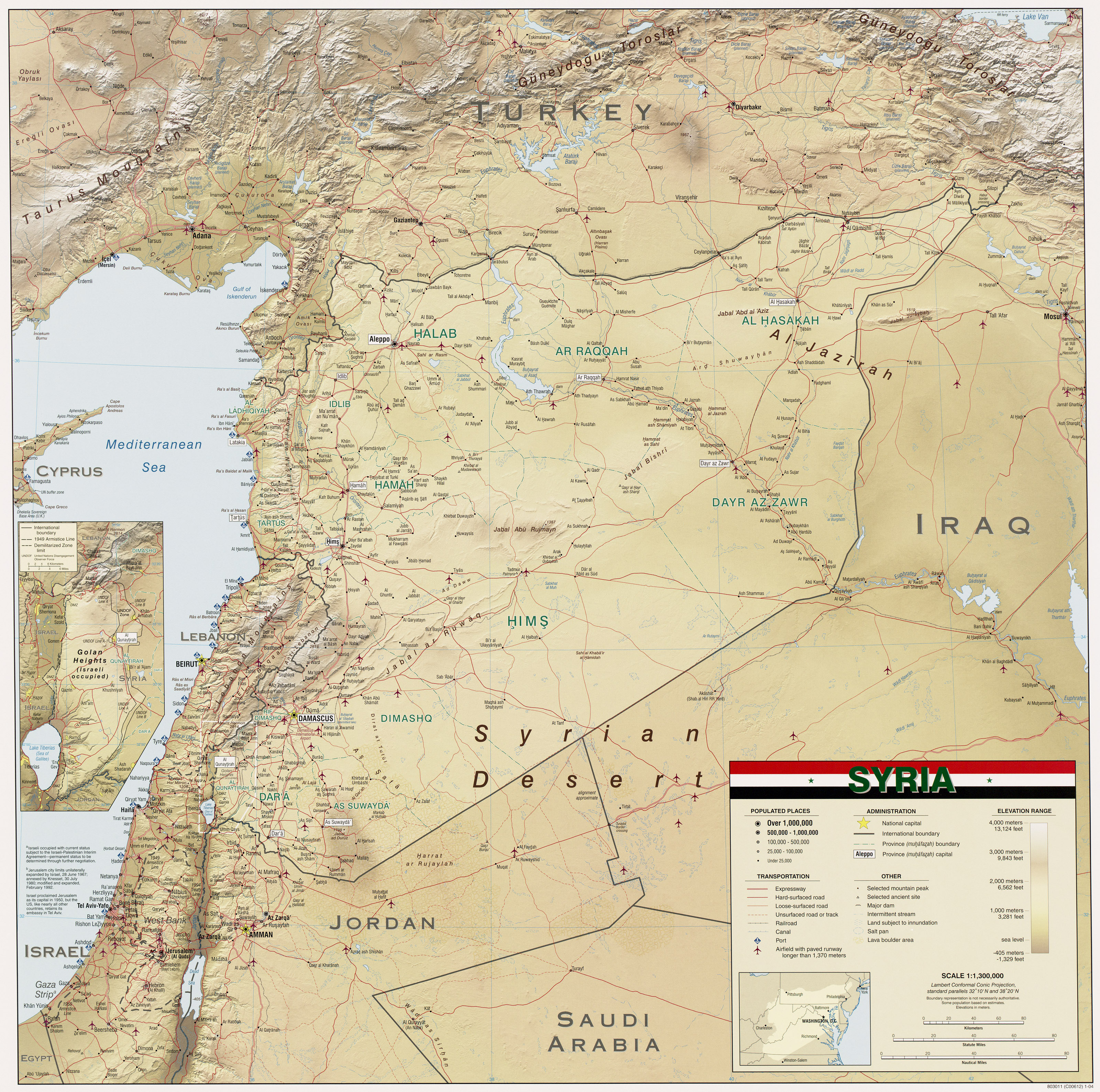
Map of Syria, with Turkey to the north

The border between the Syrian Arab Republic and the Republic of Turkey (Arabic: الحدود السورية التركية, romanized: alhudud alsuwriat alturkia; Turkish: Suriye–Türkiye sınırı) is 909 kilometres (565 mi) long, and runs from the Mediterranean Sea in the west to the tripoint with Iraq in the east. It runs across Upper Mesopotamia for some 400 kilometres (250 mi), crossing the Euphrates and reaching as far as the Tigris. Much of the border follows the Southern Turkish stretch of the Baghdad Railway, roughly along the 37th parallel between the 37th and 42nd eastern meridians. In the west, it almost surrounds the Turkish Hatay Province, partly following the course of the Orontes River and reaching the Mediterranean coast at the foot of Jebel Aqra. Should Turkey, which is a candidate for EU membership, accede to the EU, Syria will be a border neighbor with the European Union.

== Description ==
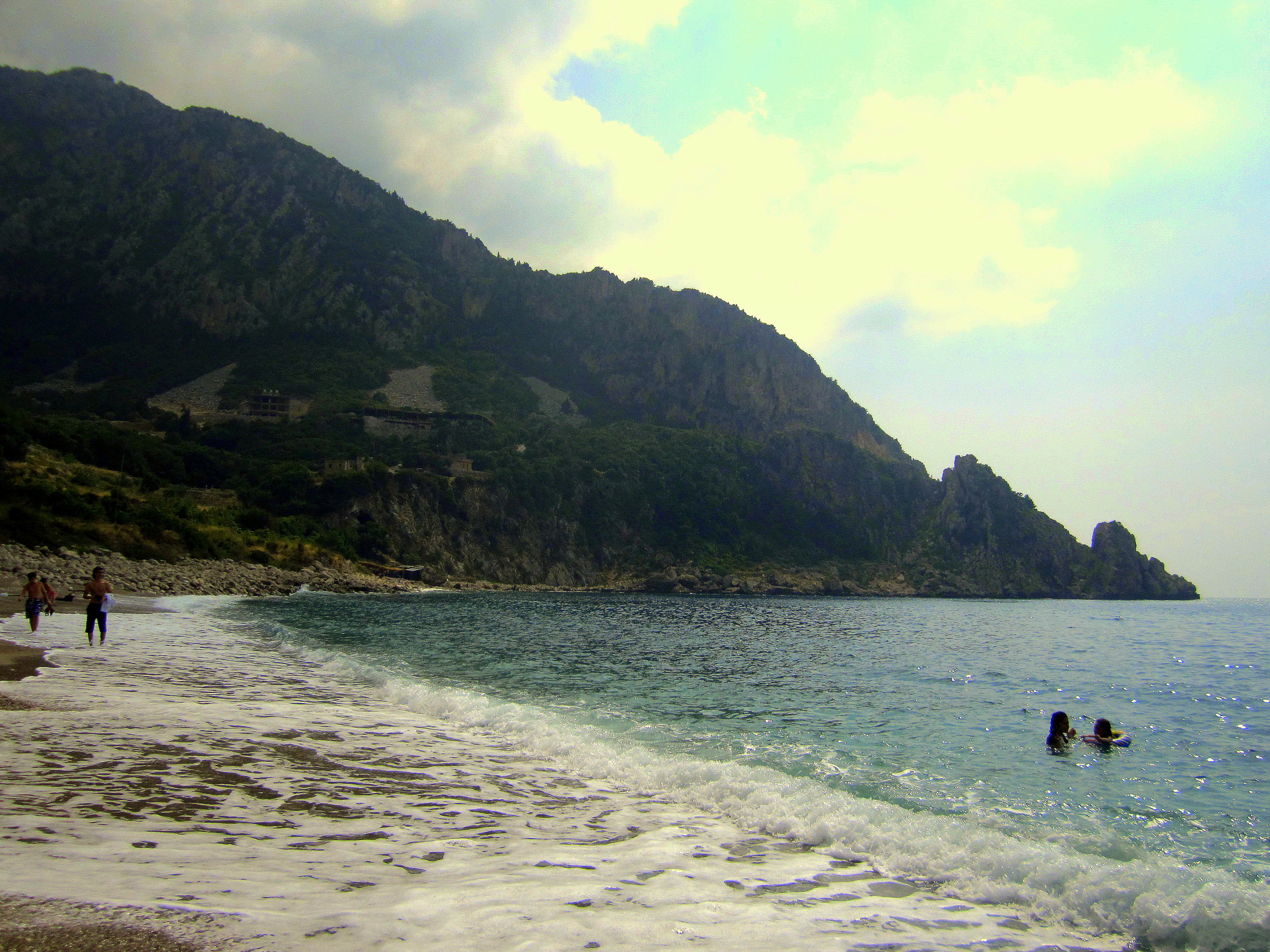
Karadouran/al-Samara beach near Kessab, Syria, along the Syrian-Turkish borderline, where Mount Dyunag touches the Mediterranean Sea

Since Turkey's 1939 appropriation of the Hatay State, the Syrian–Turkish border touches the Mediterranean coast at Ras al-Bassit, south of Mount Aqra (35.9288°N 35.9178°E). Hatay province borders the Syrian Latakia and Idlib governorates. The westernmost (and southernmost) border crossing is at 35.905°N 36.010°E, some 3 km west of Yayladağı. The border reaches its southernmost point at 35.808°N 36.152°E, 2 km west of Bidama, to include the now-abandoned village of Topraktutan (Beysun) in Hatay.

The border runs north and east, following the Orontes River for a part of its course, where in 2011 construction of a Syria–Turkey Friendship Dam began (but was delayed by the Syrian Civil War), and east to the Bab al-Hawa Border Crossing on the İskenderun–Aleppo road, then further north to the border between Hatay and Gaziantep Province, where it turns sharply east outside of Meidan Ekbis (Afrin District), at 36.830°N 36.665°E.

With the exception of Hatay province, the Turkish side of the border is entirely within the Southeastern Anatolia Region. East of Meidan Ekbis, the border stretches eastward for some 400 km, roughly following the 37th parallel north and passing the 37th to 42nd meridians. From Al-Rai to Nusaybin/Qamishli, the border follows the tracks of the Konya-Baghdad Railway. It crosses the Euphrates River at Jarabulus/Karkamış and passes north of the border town of Kobanî (Ayn al Arab) (built in 1912 as part of the Baghdad Railway construction project). The Raqqa Governorate's Tell Abyad District borders the Turkish Şanlıurfa Province, including the divided border town of Tell Abyad/Akçakale. The Al-Hasakah Governorate, still bordering Şanlıurfa Province, has a border crossing at Ras al-Ayn, connecting to Ceylanpınar. Some 100 km east of Ceylanpınar, the border passes the border town of Nusaybin in the Turkish Mardin Province (ancient Nisibis, the birthplace of Ephraim the Syrian), next to Syrian Qamishli. The Syrian Aleppo Governorate has a 221 kilometres (137 mi) long northern boundary with the Turkish Kilis, Gaziantep, and Şanlıurfa provinces.

On the Turkish side, the European route E90 runs alongside the length of the border, crossing the Euphrates at Birecik and the Tigris at Cizre. For the final 30 km the border follows the course of the Tigris, turning towards the south-east, until it reaches the Iraq-Syria-Turkey tripoint at 37.106°N 42.355°E.

== History ==
Turkey's borders as determined by the 1920 Treaty of Sèvres.

At the start of the 20th century the entire border region was part of the Ottoman Empire. During the First World War, the Arab Revolt (supported by the British) ousted the Ottomans from Syria and Mesopotamia. However Britain and France secretly agreed to partition the area between them in 1916 via the Sykes–Picot Agreement.

In 1920 Syria formally became a French mandatory territory, being initially split into a number of states, including the French-controlled Sanjak of Alexandretta (modern Hatay province). By the 1920 Treaty of Sèvres Anatolian Turkey was to be partitioned, with the Syrian-Turkish frontier placed further north than its current position. Turkish nationalists protested the treaty, contributing to the outbreak the Turkish War of Independence; the Turkish success in this conflict rendered Sèvres obsolete. A new border more favourable to Turkey was drawn by the Franco-Turkish Treaty of Ankara in 1921 after negotiations between French Prime Minister Aristide Briand and Turkish Foreign Minister Yusuf Kemal Bey. By the 1923 Treaty of Lausanne Turkey's independence was recognised and a more generous territorial settlement was agreed upon, with Turkey formally renouncing any claim to Arab lands. Following Lausanne, the Syrian-Turkish frontier was delimited more precisely between Meidan Ekbis and Nusaybin in 1926, and between Nusaybin and the tripoint with Iraq in 1929. A Final Delimitation Protocol covering the entire boundary east of Hatay was then confirmed and deposited with the League of Nations on 3 May 1930.

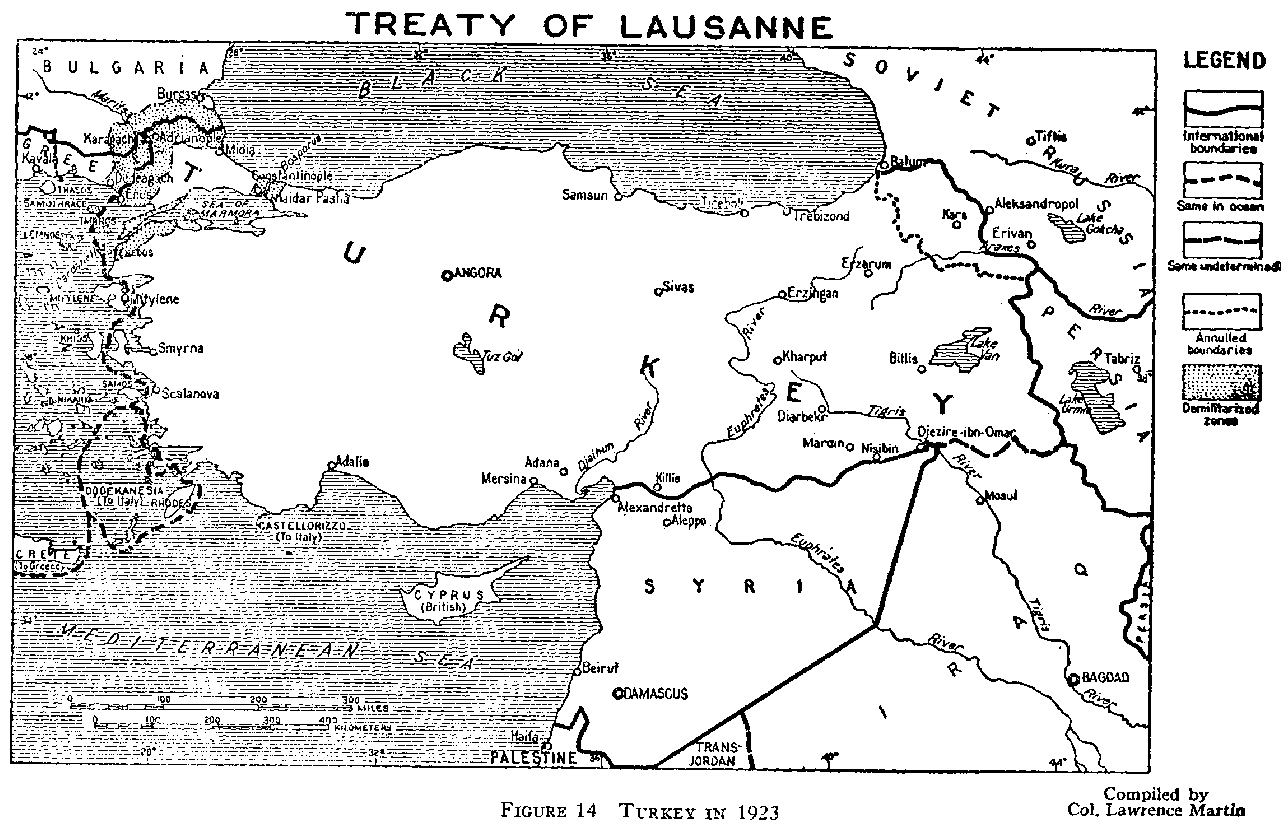
Turkey's borders as determined by the 1923 Treaty of Lausanne. Note that Hatay province is shown as Syrian territory.

A special case was Turkey's Hatay province, which remained autonomous until 1923. In 1938, in the wake of the Franco-Syrian Treaty of Independence (1936), the Sanjak of Alexandretta became the Hatay State and was annexed by Turkey as Hatay Province in 1939. The Hatay section of the boundary was delimited in 1938 and confirmed the following year, being marked on the ground by numerous pillars. Hatay was then formally transferred to Turkey on 23 July 1939.

Syria gained independence in 1944, and the frontier then became the border between two sovereign states. When Turkey joined NATO (1952) and the OSCE (1973), its boundary with Syria was recognized as a border by these organisations. Syria continued to claim Hatay province as part of Greater Syria, depicting the region as part of Syria on official maps.

Since the outbreak of the Syrian civil war in 2011, tensions across the border have increased. In addition to repeated border incidents there has also been a substantial influx of refugees across the border to Turkey.

U.S. President Barack Obama secretly authorized the CIA to arm Syria's rebels during the Operation Timber Sycamore through the Syria–Turkey border. In mid-2012, the CIA, together with Qatar and Saudi Arabia, began arming militias in Syria from their joint operations base at Incirlik Air Base, a NATO base in southern Turkey. The program became public knowledge in mid-2016.

Turkey began construction of a border barrier in 2014.

According to the Syrian Observatory for Human Rights, 471 Syrians civilians, including 86 children and 45 women, have been killed by the Turkish gendarmerie at the Syrian–Turkish border since the beginning of the Syrian civil war. Many more death followed.

== Border crossings ==
There are currently 10 official land crossings and 1 railway crossing and one joint land & railway crossing between Turkey and Syria. Railway crossings are unused and some land crossings are fully operational for trade and civil use of Turkish and Syrian nationals while 3rd country nationals without Turkish or Syrian nationality are unable to use the land borders.

#	Name of the crossing	Closest Turkish Settlement	Closest Syrian Settlement	Status
1	Yayladağı-Kassab Border Gate	Yayladağı	Kessab	Open for Turkish & Syrian Nationals
2	Cilvegözü - Bab-al-Hawa Border Gate	Reyhanlı	Sarmada	Open for Turkish & Syrian Nationals
3	Zeytindalı-Hamam Border Gate	Kumlu	Jindires	Open for Turkish & Syrian Nationals
4	Öncüpınar - Bab-al-Salama Border Gate	Kilis	al-Salameh	Open for Turkish & Syrian Nationals
5	Çobanbey Border Gate	Elbeyli	Al Rae	Open for Turkish & Syrian Nationals
6	Karkamış-Jarablus Border Gate	Karkamış	Jarablus	Open for Turkish & Syrian Nationals
7	Mürşitpınar - Ayn-al-Arab Border Gate	Mürşitpınar	Kobane	Closed
8	Akçakale-Tal Abyad Border Gate	Akçakale	Tall Abyad	Limited customs for Voluntary Returns.
9	Ceylanpınar-Rasulayn Border Gate	Ceylanpınar	Ras al-Ayn	Limited customs for crossings with permit
10	Şenyurt-Derbassiyeh Border Gate	Şenyurt	Derbassiyeh	Closed
11	Nusaybin-Qamishli Border Gate	Nusaybin	Qamishli	Closed

In addition to the official crossings, 8 more military crossings were identified by OCHA in 2023 during the earthquake relief efforts. From west to east, the status of these unofficial and informal military crossings as of 18 April 2023 may be found below.

#	Turkey	Syria	Type	Status
1	Kızılçat	Samira	Dirt Road	Closed
2	Topraktutan	Yunesiyeh	Dirt Road	Closed
3	Aşağıpulluyazı	Ein al-Bayda	Dirt Road	Closed
4	Güveççi	Kherbet Eljoz	Dirt Road	Closed
5	Karbeyaz (Yiğitoğlu)	Darkush	Dirt Road	Closed
6	Ziyaret	Al-Alani	Dirt Road	Closed
7	Bükülmez	Atme	Dirt Road	Closed
8	İslahiye	Meidan Ekbis	Railway	Closed
9	Cizre	Al-Malikiyah	Dirt Road	Closed

== Gallery ==
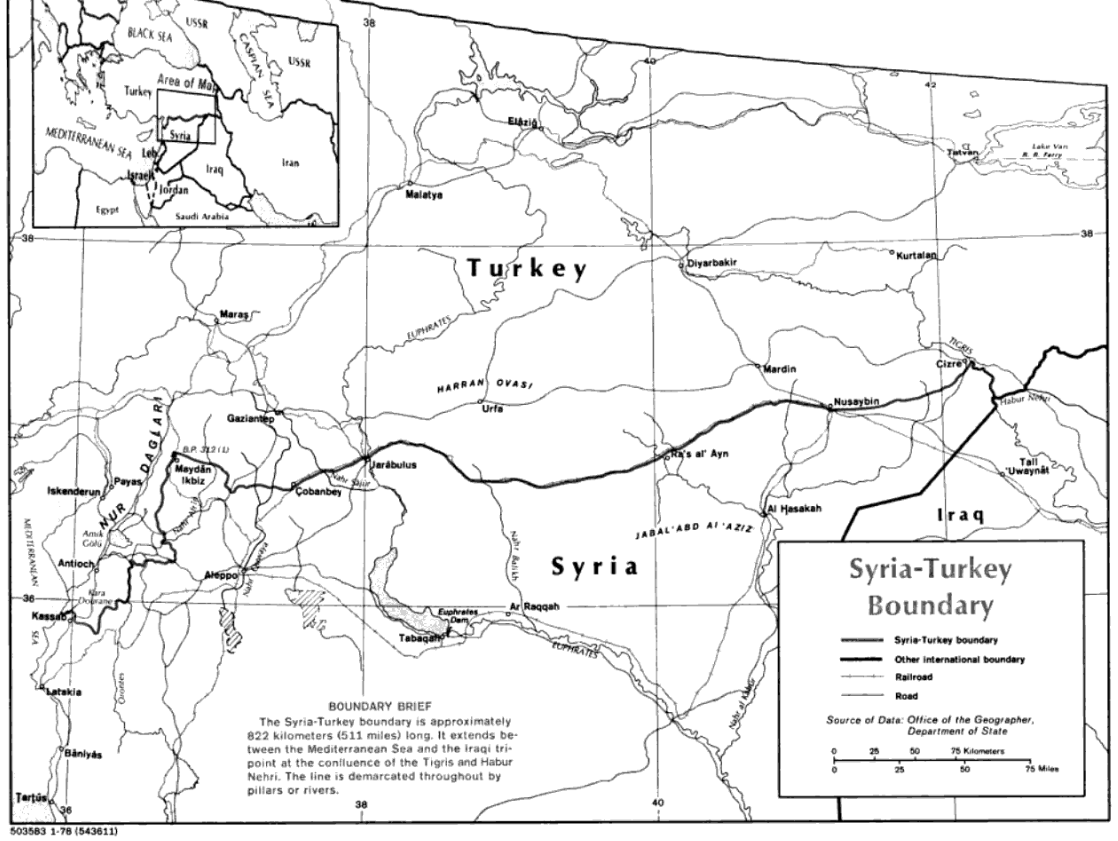
Map of the Syria–Turkey border

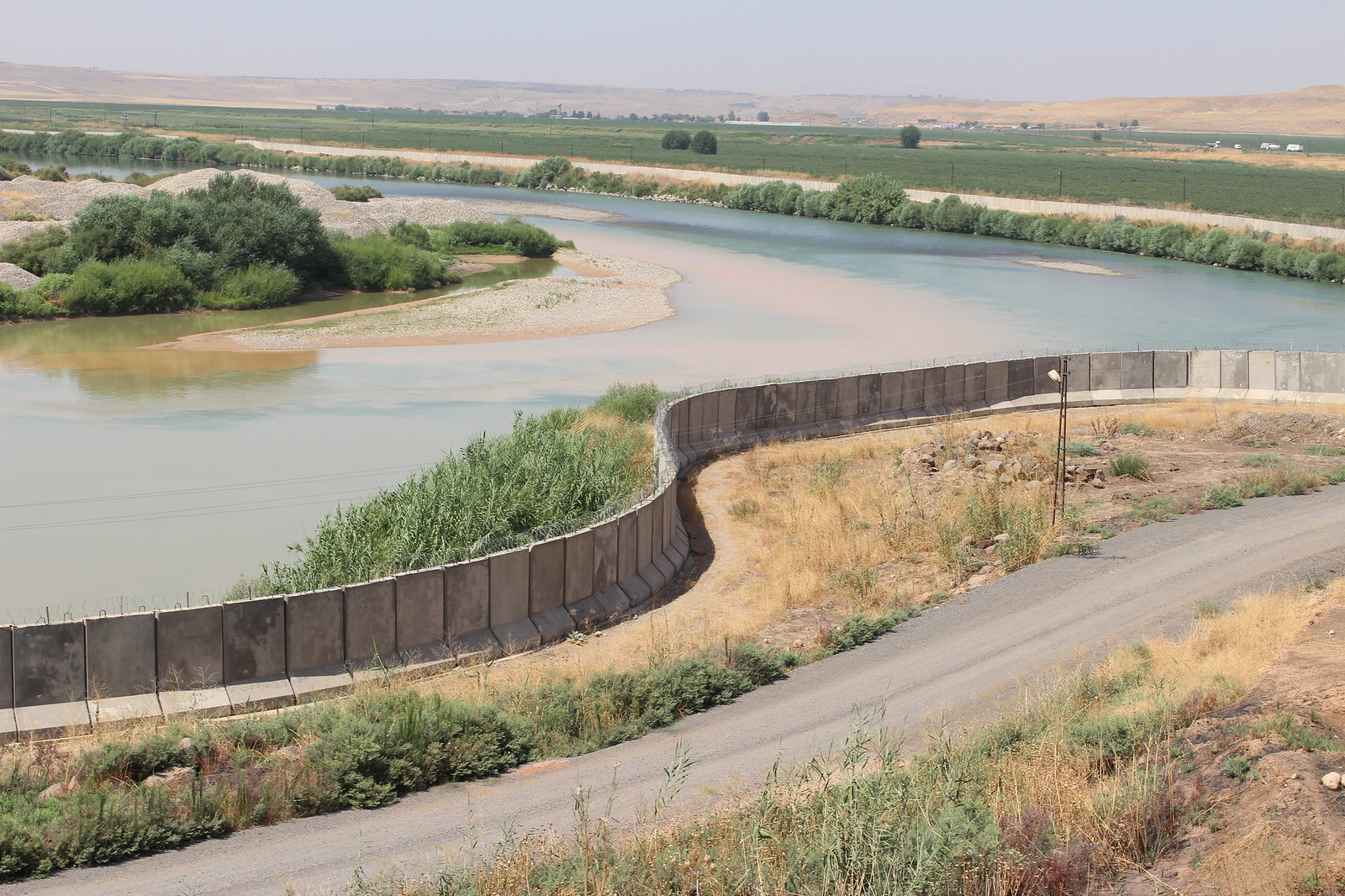
A section of the border wall built by Turkey

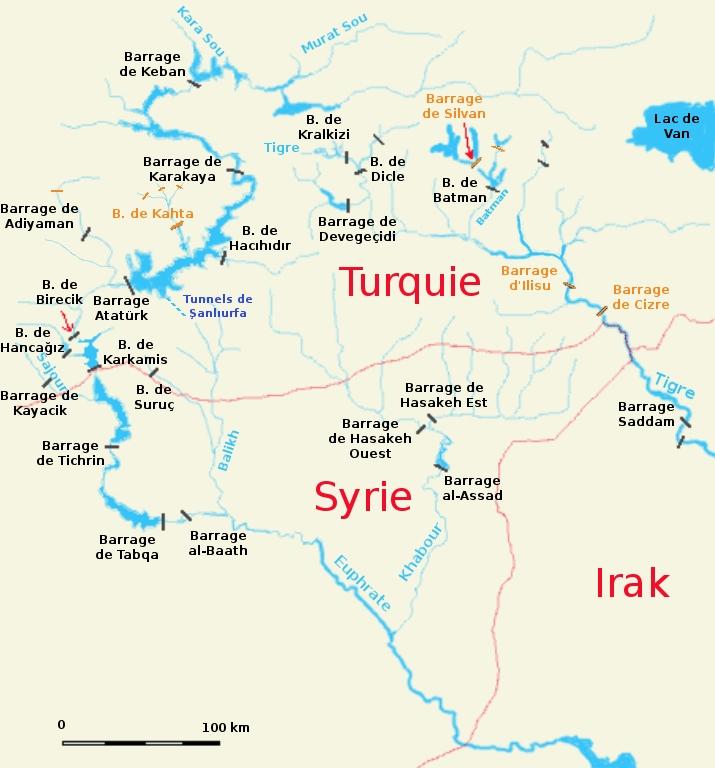
Map of the Tigris–Euphrates river system across the eastern part of the Syro-Turkish border

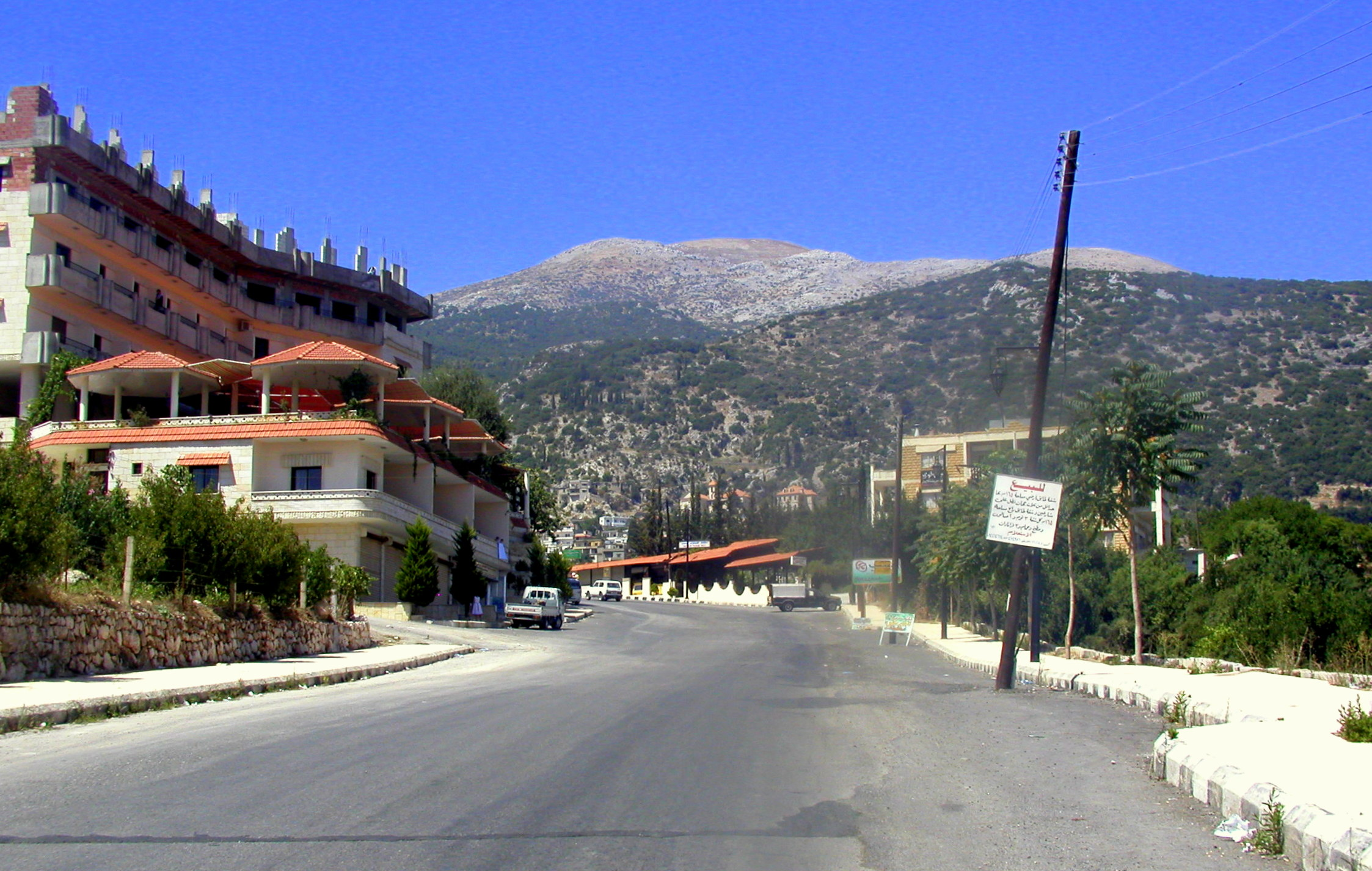
The Syrian town of Kessab, with the peak of Mount Aqra (Turkey) in the background

== See also ==
- Hatay dispute
- Syria–Turkey barrier
- Syria–Turkey relations
- Syrian–Turkish border clashes during the Syrian Civil War
  - Northern Syria Buffer Zone
- Syrian Turkmen
- Refugees of the Syrian Civil War
