= Şenyurt–Mardin railway =

The Şenyurt-Mardin railway (Turkish: Şenyurt-Mardin demiryolu), also known as the Mardin railway, is a 24.3 km (15.1 mi) railway in Southeastern Turkey. The railway branches of the Aleppo-Nusaybin railway, formerly the Baghdad Railway, at Şenyurt and runs north across a flat plain to Mardin. The line was built in 1918 by the Baghdad Railway, shortly before the Ottoman Empire surrendered in World War I.
