= Turkey border walls =

There are four Turkey border walls:

- Turkey–Syria border barrier
- Turkey–Iran border barrier
- Bulgaria–Turkey border
- Turkey–Greece border barrier
