= Toprakkale–İskenderun railway =

Railway in Turkey

Toprakkale-İskenderun railway

Overview
- Native name: Toprakkale-İskenderun demiryolu
- Status: Operating
- Owner: Turkish State Railways
- Locale: Hatay
- Termini: Toprakkale, Turkey; İskenderun, Turkey

Service
- Type: Heavy rail
- System: Turkish State Railways
- Operator(s): TCDD Transport; Körfez Ulaştırma

History
- Opened: 1 November 1912

Technical
- Line length: 58.9 km (36.6 mi)
- Num of tracks: Single track
- Track gauge: 1,435 mm (4 ft 8 1/2 in) standard gauge
- Loading gauge: 22.5t
- Electrification: 25 kV, 50 Hz
- Operating speed: 80 km/h (50 mph)
- Signalling: CTC

The Toprakkale–İskenderun railway (Turkish: Toprakkale–İskenderun demiryolu) is a 58.9 km (36.6 mi) long electrified railway in southern Turkey. The railway branches off the Adana–Aleppo railway at Toprakkale and heads south along the northeastern coast of the Mediterranean in the province Hatay and terminates at İskenderun, a port city on the Mediterranean.

== Infrastructure and route ==
The line departs from Toprakkale railway station and immediately turns south. It passes at the foot of the fortress of the same name and then continues south, through the coastal plain to Dörtyol and then Payas. After Payas, the coastal plain becomes very narrow and line had to be built on the seashore. The railway halt of Denizciler is roughly 30m away from the beach. The railway enters İskenderun city from the north and the station was established near the historical port. The line is mostly flat and straight, except for the section that was built on the seashore. It did not present any engineering difficulties. There are no notable tunnels nor bridges.

Toprakkale-İskenderun railway

The line is single track, standard gauge, with passing sidings which are on roughly 8 km apart on average. Most of the sidings allow for 600m long train. The sidings are in the following stations:

Stations and sidings
Station	Kilometer point	Altitude (m)	number of sidings	Siding length (m)
Erzin	11,3	52	2	780
Karabasamak	22,2	8	1	800
Dörtyol	30,2	23	3	750
Payas	36,7	11	7	1400
İsdemir	41,9	30	3	850
Sarıseki	48,7	3	2	550

The line was equipped with TCDD Centralized traffic control signaling and TSI signals. The CTC center is in Malatya.

The line was electrified in 25 kV 50 Hz with overhead catenary in 1994. There is an electrical substation converting the 154 kV from the main grid to 25 kV. It is located near Payas station.

=== Junctions ===
When exiting Toprakkale railway station, there is a triangle junction allowing trains coming either from Osmaniye, in the North to continue towards İskenderun without reversing in Toprakkale.

== Traffic ==
The line serve a densely populated area which is also very industrialized. The industries are clustered around the İsdemir steel works. This factory is one of the biggest of its kind in Turkey. It is served by a large internal industrial railway, connected to TCDD at Payas station. This factory receives iron ore mostly by trains. Coal for this factory is usually coming by boat.

There is also a spur to serve a petroleum terminal in Dörtyol, several spurs to steel and other heavy material factories in Sarıseki. And finally, there is a spur to Iskenderun port which is a large container terminal.

There are no long-distance passenger trains on this line. It served by a regional train going from Adana to İskenderun.

== History ==
The line was built by the Chemin de Fer Impérial Ottoman de Baghdad (CIOB) as a part of their concession to build a railway from Konya to Baghdad. The line opened on 1 November 1912. It connected to the railway from Adana to Toprakkale and Mamure which opened earlier in 1912. These two lines along with the Adana Mersin line formed an isolated network until it could be connected in 1918 to the rest of the CIOB network.

After the end of World War 1 and the Treaty of Versailles, the line was transferred to the Chemins de fer de Cilicie Nord-Syrie (CNS), a railway company that was set-up to take over the CIOB lines in French controlled territories: Cilicia and Syria.

Following the Treaty of Ankara (1921), Cilicia was returned to Turkey, except for the Sanjak of Alexandretta which remained under French mandate. At this point, the line became international, crossing the border near Payas.

On 27 October 1932, following the purchase of the Adana Fevzipasa railway by the Turkish State Railways, the Toprakkale–İskenderun railway is transferred to two new companies:

- Toprakkale-Payas, in Turkish territory is transferred to Société Turque d'exploitation des Chemins de fer du Sud de la Turquie, or commonly known as Cenup Demiryolları.
- Payas-İskenderun is transferred to Lignes Syriennes du Chemins de Baghdad (LSB), itself a subsidiary company of the Damas, Hamah et Prolongements (DHP). The Cenup Demiryolları control of its section of the line was effective 30 June 1937.

The Sanjak of Alexandretta became part of Turkey along with the Hatay Province on 7 July 1939. The Payas-İskenderun railway was taken over on 12 August 1939 by the Turkish State Railways. At this point, the two halves of the Toprakkale–İskenderun railway were reunited again under a single ownership.

== See also ==
- Adana–Aleppo railway
- Berlin–Baghdad railway
