= Bidama =

Bidama بِدَامَا
- Town
- Location within Syria
- Coordinates: 35°48′45″N 36°11′37″E
- Country: Syria
- Governorate: Idlib Governorate
- District: Jisr al-Shughur District
- Subdistrict: Bidama Subdistrict

Population (2004 census)
  - Total: 4,162
- Time zone: UTC+2 (EET)
  - Summer (DST): UTC+3 (EEST)

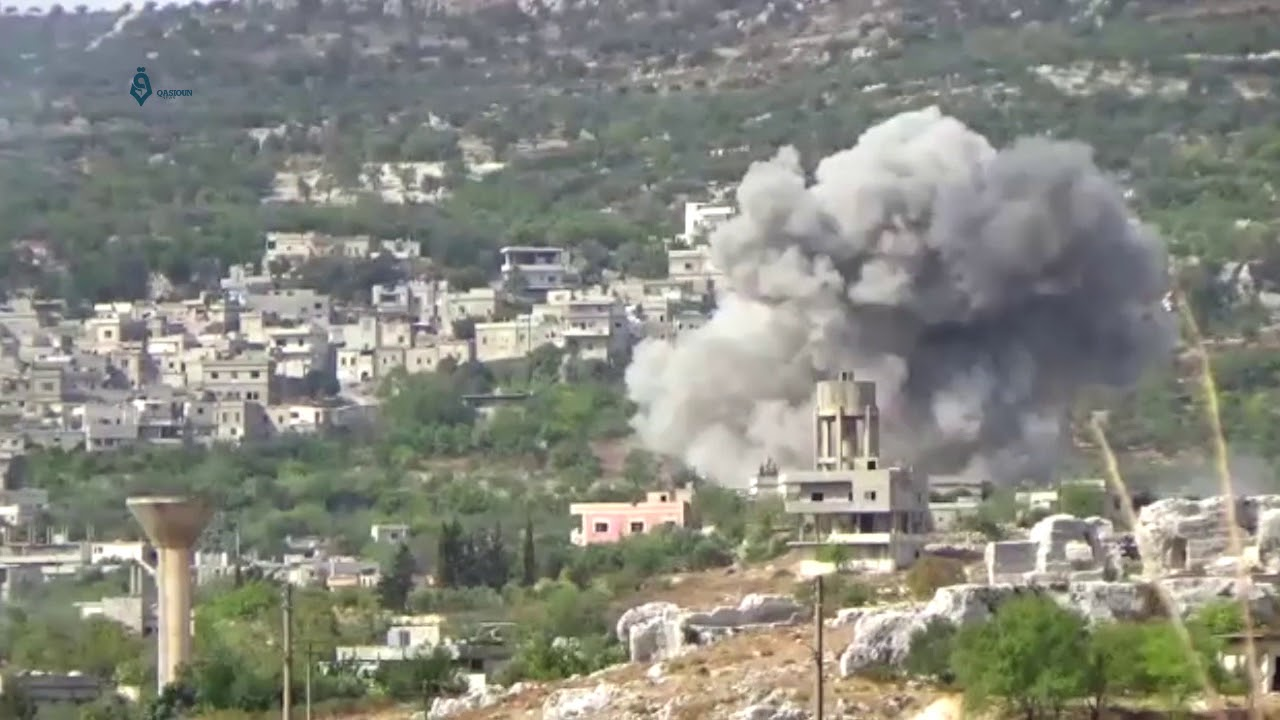
An air strike in Bidama

Bidama (Arabic: بِدَامَا, romanized: Bidāmā; also spelled Bdama and Badama) is a town in northern Syria, administratively part of the Idlib Governorate, located northwest of Idlib along the border with Turkey. Nearby localities include al-Najiyah to the southeast, Jisr al-Shughur to the east, Shughur al-Fuqani and al-Janudiyah to the northeast. According to the Syria Central Bureau of Statistics, Bidama had a population of 4,162 in the 2004 census. The town is also the administrative center and the second largest locality of the Bidama nahiyah which consisted of 14 localities with a combined population of 18,501 in 2004. Its inhabitants are predominantly Sunni Muslim Kurds.

Ancient ruins are situated just to the northeast of the town.

== Bibliography ==
- Boulanger, Robert (1966). The Middle East, Lebanon, Syria, Jordan, Iraq, Iran. Hachette.
