= Şenyurt, Kızıltepe =

Şenyurt
- Neighbourhood
- Location in Turkey
- Coordinates: 37.082°N 40.650°E
- Country: Turkey
- Province: Mardin
- District: Kızıltepe
- Population (2022): 1,144
- Time zone: UTC+3 (TRT)

Şenyurt (Kurdish: Dirbêsî) is a neighbourhood of the municipality and district of Kızıltepe, Mardin Province, Turkey. Its population is 1,144 (2022). Before the 2013 reorganisation, it was a town (belde). It is populated by Kurds of the Kîkan Kurdish tribe. Şenyurt is situated 12 kilometres (7 mi) south of Kızıltepe and 30 kilometres (19 mi) south of Mardin.

== History ==
After the First World War, the Turkish Empire collapsed and Syria was occupied by the French army. Later, the French occupation zone became the Syrian Arab Republic. The Syria–Turkey border line follows the railroad. Like all settlements on the railroad, the southern quarters of the town are in Syria and the northern quarters are in Turkey. The southern portion in Syria is Al-Dirbasiyah (Arabic: الدرباسية).

== Economy ==
In 2016, Turkey decided to build a wall along the border with Syria and the border gate closed in 2017, as the wall was about to be in place. Thus, the town lost an important source of revenue.
