= Treaty of Ankara (1921) =

Treaty between the Grand National Assembly of Turkey and France

Franco-Turkish Pact 1921 (Treaty of Ankara)

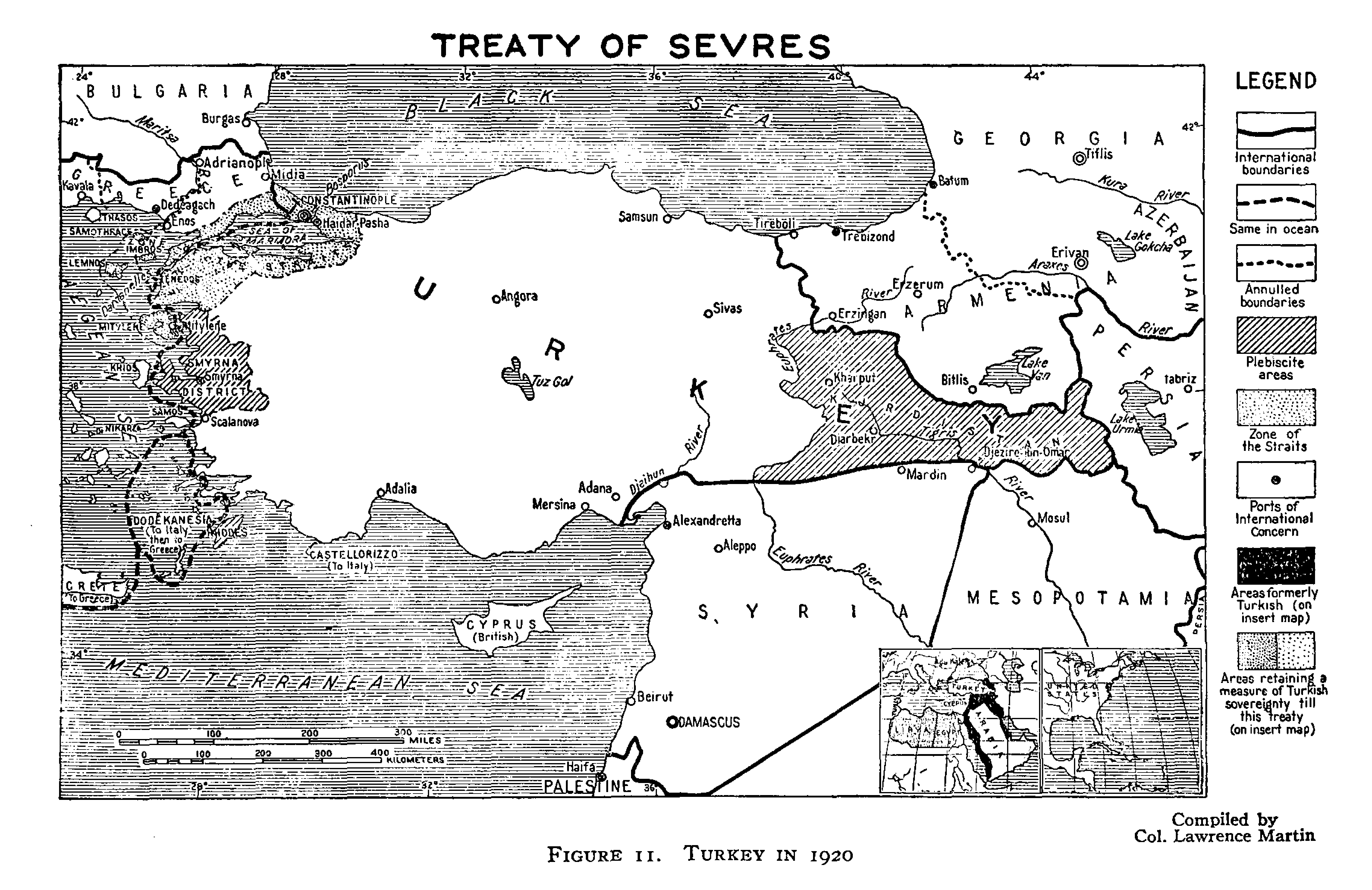
Treaty of Sèvres border between Turkey and Syria, 1920

The Ankara Agreement (1921) (or the Accord of Ankara; Franklin-Bouillon Agreement; Franco-Turkish Agreement of Ankara, Turkish: Ankara Antlaşması, French: Traité d'Ankara) was signed on 20 October 1921 at Ankara (also known as Angora) between France and the Grand National Assembly of Turkey, ending the Franco-Turkish War.

The signatories were French diplomat Henry Franklin-Bouillon and Turkish foreign minister Yusuf Kemal Bey. Based on the terms of the agreement, the French acknowledged the end of the Franco-Turkish War and ceded large areas to Turkey. However other French units in Turkey were not affected, in return for economic concessions from Turkey. In return, the Turkish government acknowledged French imperial sovereignty over the French Mandate of Syria. The treaty was registered in League of Nations Treaty Series on 30 August 1926.

This treaty changed the Syria–Turkey border set by the 1920 Treaty of Sèvres to the benefit of Turkey, ceding it large areas of the Aleppo and Adana vilayets. From west to east, the cities and districts of Adana, Osmaniye, Marash, Aintab, Kilis, Urfa, Mardin, Nusaybin, and Jazirat ibn Umar (Cizre) were consequently ceded to Turkey. The border was to run from the Mediterranean Sea immediately south of Payas to Meidan Ekbis (which would remain in Syria), then bend towards the south-east, running between Marsova (Mersawa) in the Sharran district of Syria and Karnaba and Kilis in Turkey, to join the Baghdad Railway at Al-Rai From there it would follow the railway track to Nusaybin, with the border being on the Syrian side of the track, leaving the track in Turkish territory. From Nusaybin it would follow the old road to Jazirat ibn Umar, with the road being in Turkish territory, although both countries could use it.

The sanjak of Alexandretta in Syria was given a special administrative status, with official recognition of the Turkish language and provision for the cultural development of the Turkish inhabitants, who were the largest single ethnoreligious group. According to Article 9 of the treaty the Tomb of Suleyman Shah (the burial place of Suleyman Shah, the grandfather of Osman I, the founder of the Ottoman Empire) in Syria "shall remain, with its appurtenances, the property of Turkey, who may appoint guardians for it and may hoist the Turkish flag there".

This annulment of French claims over Turkish land was later officially recognized in the Armistice of Mudanya. The new border was recognized in the subsequent Treaty of Lausanne in 1923.

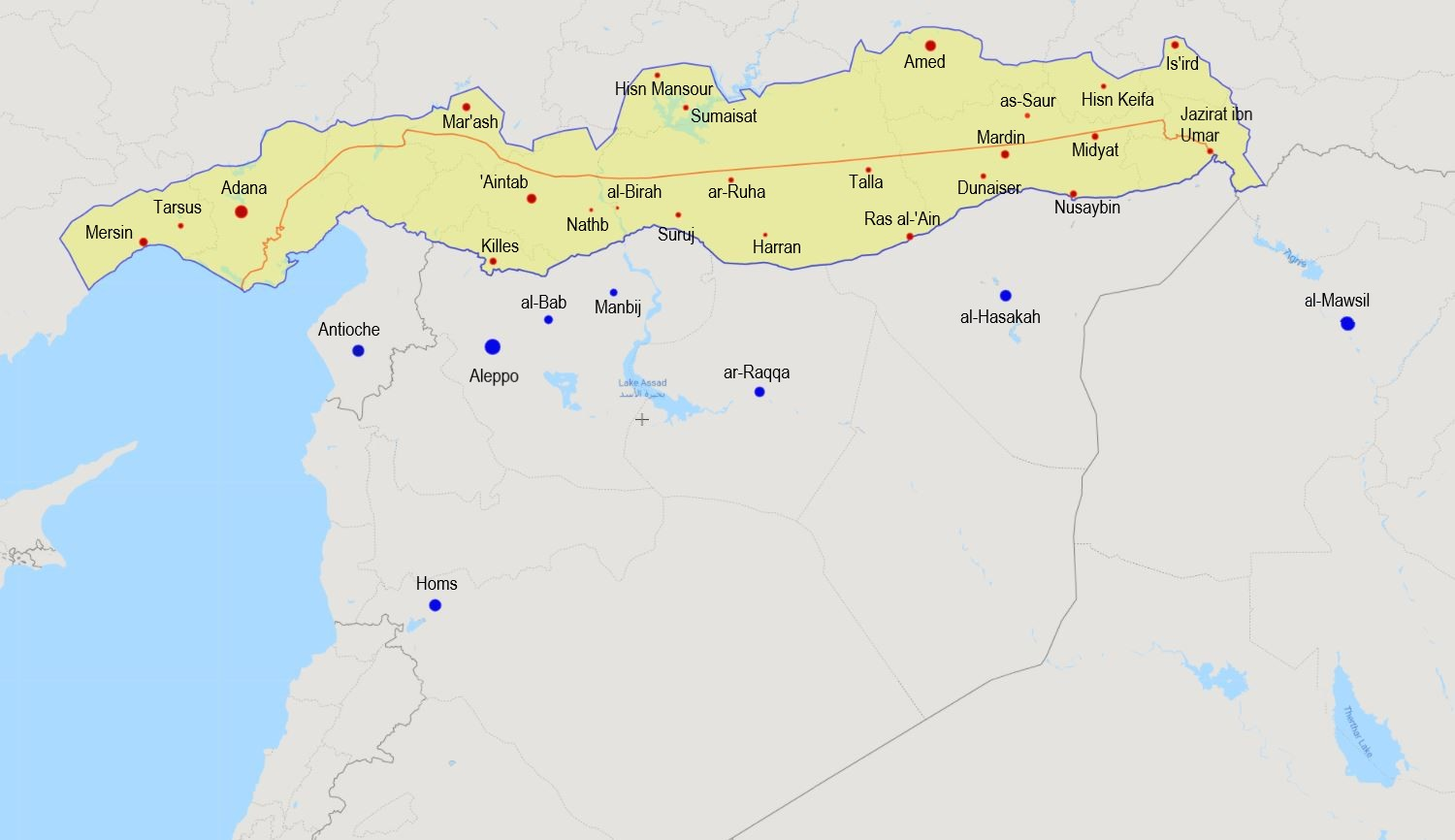
Northern Syrian Sanjaks ceded to Turkey by France in the Treaty of Ankara 1921
