= IRR Transversal Line =

Railway Line in Iraq

Map of the IRR Transversal Line.

The IRR Transversal Line or the Haditha–Kirkuk Railway (Route Number 4) is a railway line of the Iraqi Republic Railways that connects Haditha and Haqlaniyah with Kirkuk via Baiji. It is a single-track unelectrified line. The railway is about 252 km (157 mi) long and has a maximum travel speed of 100 km/h (62 mph). Unlike other Iraqi rail lines, it does not end at Baghdad. At present, the railway line is only operational for freight transport between Haditha and Baiji. However, the damaged truss-bridge over the Tigris has halted the resumption of services to Kirkuk. The railway's state is notably deteriorated, reflecting the widespread disrepair of Iraq's rail infrastructure.

== Geographic Position ==
The line crosses the north of Iraq, roughly where the country has the greatest east-west extension, from the southwest to the northeast. It connects the Haidtha Railway Station in the west of the country along the IRR Western with Kirkuk in the east. It crosses the IRR Northern near Baiji.

== Technical specifications ==
The railway line had a fully automatic electric centralized traffic control system since its inauguration in 1987. The railway line further possessed a network of telegraph cables running parallel to the rails which provided connections between the stations and locomotives. As of October 2018, the signalling and communication systems are both out of service.

Along the line, five light maintenance workshops at Baghdad, Falluja, Ramadi, Haqlaniya and Akashat and two heavy maintenance factories at Qaim and Baghdad were built.

The track gauge is standard-gauge (1435 millimetres), the gauge used on all Iraqi Railways since the 1984 closure of the Baghdad–Erbil Railway. The rails have a UIC 60 profile with welded joints designed for high-speed and heavy freight services. The axle load is 25 tons.

== History ==
=== Precursor railway ===
Ever since the latter half of the 19th century, a railway line to Kirkuk was discussed but construction was postponed due to the Great War. Eventually, service to Kirkuk commenced in August 1925 while the foundations for the Kirkuk–Baghdad–Haifa Railway were laid beginning in 1930. In 1949, a 105-kilometre extension to Erbil started construction and the first train arrived in Erbil by 1950. The current Transversal Line and the railway mentioned above only share minimal trackage.

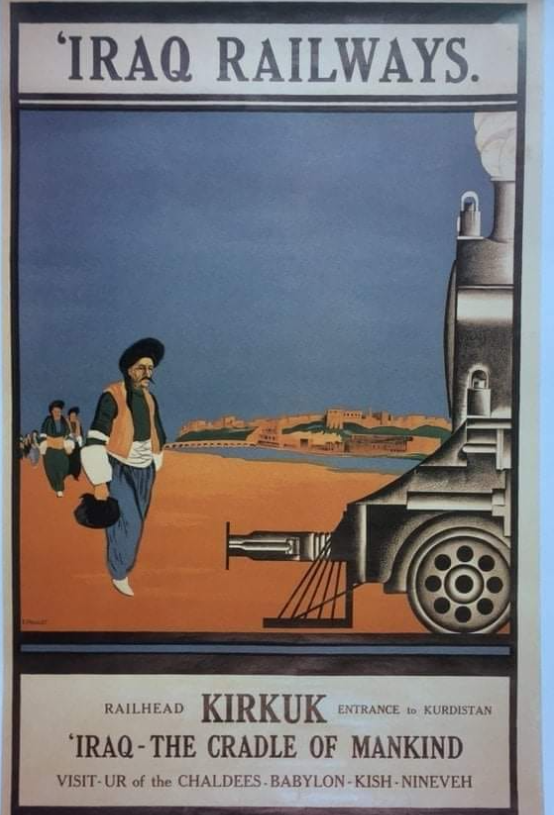
Poster from the days of the metre-gauge railway.

=== Current railway ===
The Ba'athist Regime took on a similar rail development strategy to the one prior to the 1968 coup by Saleh Zaki Tawfiq. It was believed to be beneficial to replace the IRR Eastern with a standard-gauge railway for interoperability reasons with the IRR Northern and the recently retrofitted IRR Southern. They renewed the idea of also extending the line to Sulaymaniya. However, after further economic and political evaluations, like the Iraqi–Kurdish conflict, it was decided to construct a brand-new standard-gauge railway from Kirkuk to Haditha with an interchange at the Berlin-Baghdad Railway at Baiji. The new railway made the old connection economically obsolete, thus forcing it to close, but other, political reasons were to make Arabisation easier, by not only connecting Kirkuk better to other Sunni Arab areas in the west of Iraq but also cutting off railway access to Kurdish areas following the autonomy of Iraqi Kurdistan in 1970. Another reason for the relocation of the route was the now double connection of the Haditha oil refinery, in the west of Iraq, to the Iraqi railway network. This also provided a quicker connection from the mining operations in the Syrian Desert to the population centres in the north of Iraq.

The construction of the railway line started on August 26th, 1982. Foreign companies, such as the DE-Consult, were also involved in the project. Still, because of the Iran–Iraq War, the opening was delayed. The new line opened in 1988. A groundbreaking ceremony by the Minister of Communication Mohammed Hamza Al Zubaidi was held on November 7th, 1987. The cost for the construction of the new line was 960 million USD. Following a bombing raid by the US Air Force, the eastern branch from Baiji to Kirkuk was destroyed. Widespread vandalism by the Islamic State then took the western branch to Haditha out of service.

== Reconstruction and operation ==
On November 8, 2022, the Baiji–Haqlaniya Branch was rehabilitated by the Central Government. That way freight trains can once again travel between Baghdad and Qaim. Currently, there is no progress on rehabilitating the Kirkuk Branch due to the ongoing conflict between Baghdad and Erbil over the disputed territories of Northern Iraq, of which Kirkuk is part.
