= Berlin–Baghdad railway =

Railway line

Baghdad railway
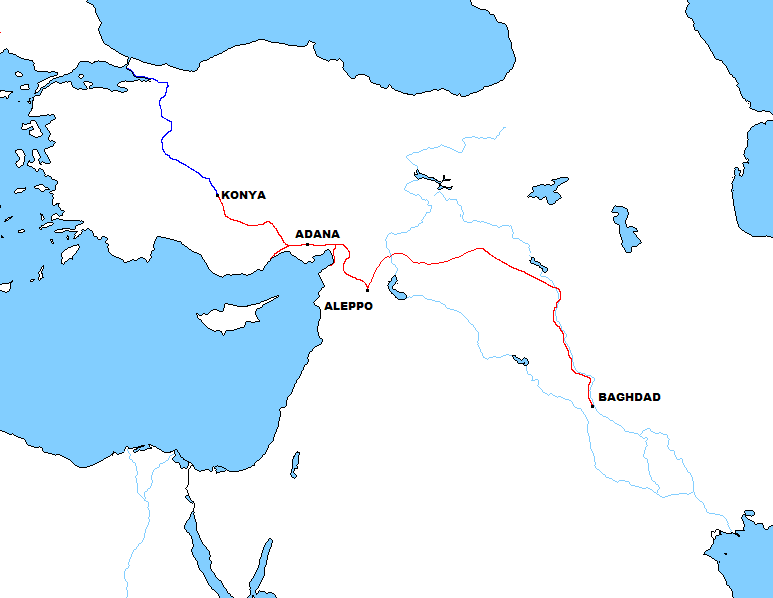
- CIOB in red (CFOA route to Istanbul in blue)

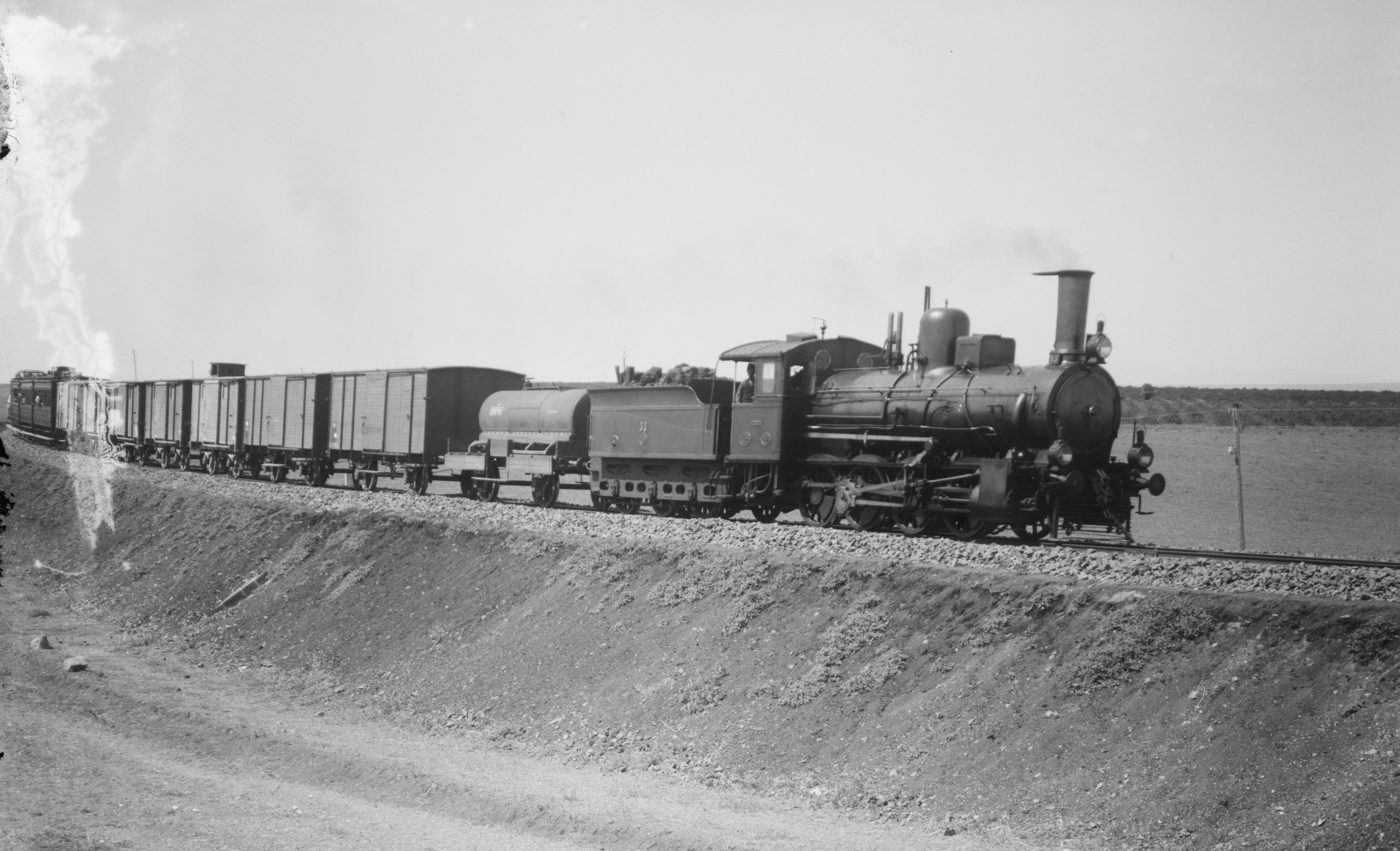
- Baghdad railway c. 1900–10

Overview
- Headquarters: Adana
- Reporting mark: CIOB
- Locale: Modern-day Iraq, northern Syria, and southeastern Turkey
- Dates of operation: 1903–1934
- Successor: TCDD, CNS

Technical
- Track gauge: 1,435 mm (4 ft 8 1/2 in) standard gauge

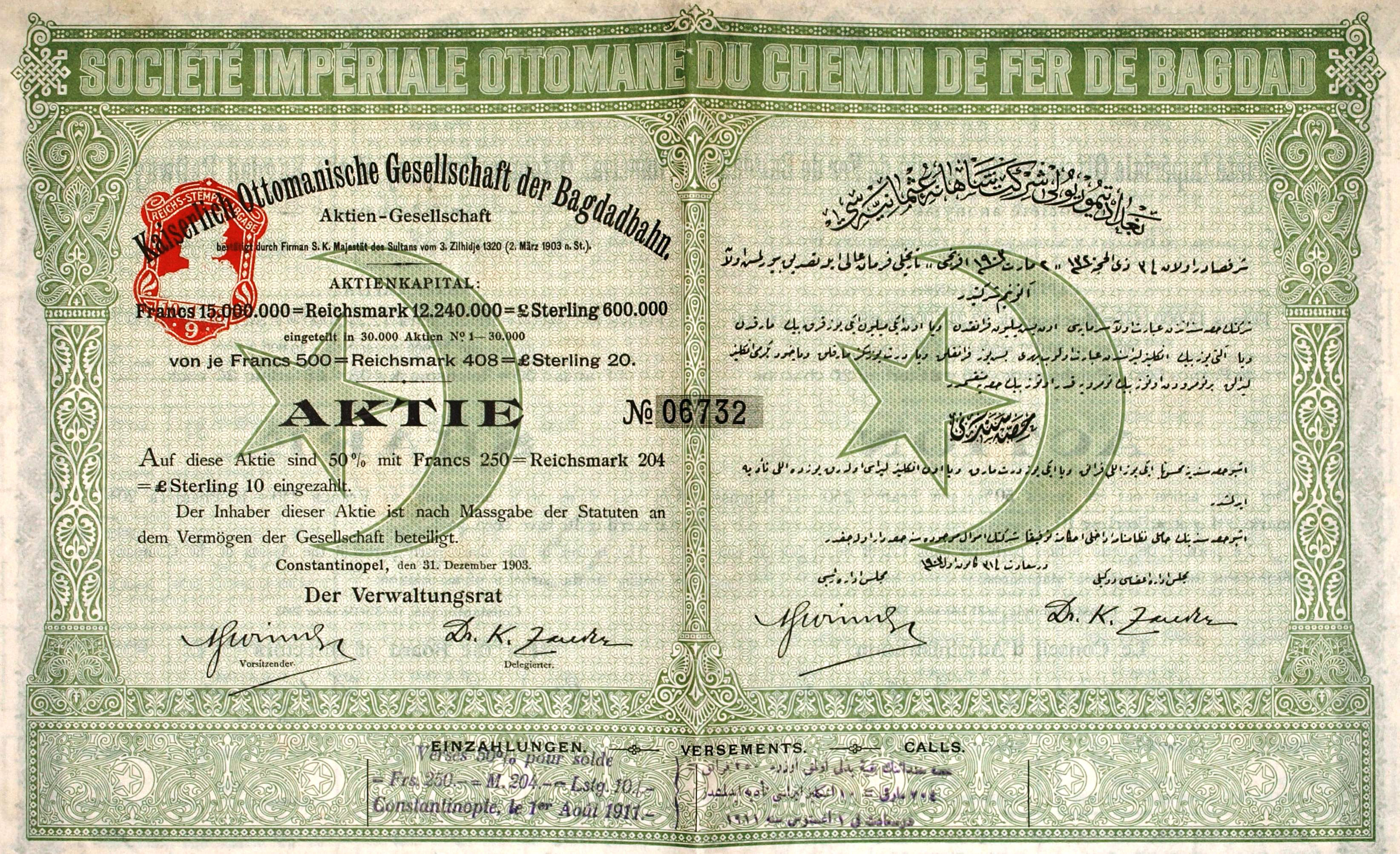
Share of the Baghdad railway, issued 31 December 1903

The Baghdad railway, also known as the Berlin–Baghdad railway (Turkish: Bağdat Demiryolu, German: Bagdadbahn, Arabic: سكة حديد بغداد, French: Chemin de Fer Impérial Ottoman de Bagdad), was started in 1903 to connect Berlin with the then Ottoman city of Baghdad, from where the Germans wanted to establish a port on the Persian Gulf, with a 1,600-kilometre (1,000 mi) line through modern-day Turkey, Syria, and Iraq. Jean-Pierre Filiu, in his 2022 book History of the Middle East, summing up the situation on the eve of the First World War, says of this (projected) railway, "The British ensured that the last stretch of the railway line, linking Baghdad to the port of Basra on the Persian Gulf, was reserved for them". The current line from Baghdad to Basra was not opened until 2014.

The line was completed only in 1940. By the outbreak of World War I, the railway was still 960 km (600 miles) away from its intended objective. The last stretch to Baghdad was built in the late 1930s, and the first train to travel from Istanbul to Baghdad departed in 1940.

Funding, engineering and construction were mainly provided by the German Empire through Deutsche Bank and the Philipp Holzmann company, which in the 1890s had built the Anatolian Railway (Anatolische Eisenbahn) connecting Istanbul, Ankara and Konya. The Ottoman Empire wished to maintain its control of the Arabian Peninsula and to expand its influence across the Red Sea into the nominally Ottoman (until 1914) Khedivate of Egypt, which had been under British military control since the Urabi Revolt in 1882. If the railway had been completed, the Germans would have gained access to suspected oil fields in Mesopotamia, (Note: See: Turkish Petroleum Company) as well as a connection to the port of Basra on the Persian Gulf. The latter would have provided access to the eastern parts of the German colonial empire, and avoided the Suez Canal, which was controlled by British and French interests.

The railway became a source of international disputes during the years immediately preceding World War I. Although it has been argued that they were resolved in 1914 before the war began, it has also been suggested that the railway was a manifestation of the imperial rivalry that was the leading cause of World War I. Technical difficulties in the remote Taurus Mountains and diplomatic delays meant that by 1915 the railway was still 480 kilometres (300 mi) short of completion, severely limiting its use during the war in which Baghdad was captured by the British while the Hejaz railway in the south was attacked by guerrilla forces led by T. E. Lawrence. Construction resumed in the 1930s and was completed in 1940.

A recent history of the railway in the specific context of World War I neatly outlines in the prologue the German global interest in countering the British Empire, and the Ottomans' regional interest in countering their Russian, French and British rivals on all sides. As stated by a contemporary 'on the ground' at the time, Morris Jastrow wrote:

It was felt in England that if, as Napoleon is said to have remarked, Antwerp in the hands of a great continental power was a pistol leveled at the English coast, Baghdad and the Persian Gulf in the hands of Germany (or any other strong power) would be a 42-centimetre gun pointed at India.

== Overview ==
Had it been completed earlier, the Berlin-Baghdad (ultimately from Hamburg to Basra) railway would have enabled transport and trade from a port in Germany through a port on the Persian Gulf from which trade goods and supplies could be exchanged directly with the farthest German colonies and the world. The journey home to Germany would have given German industry a direct supply of oil. The access to resources, with trade less affected by British control of shipping, would have been beneficial to German economic interests in industry and trade, and threatening to British economic dominance in colonial trade.

The railway also threatened Russia since it was accepted as axiomatic that political followed economic influence, and the railway was expected to extend Germany's economic influence towards the Caucasian frontier and into northern Persia, where Russia had a dominant share of the market.

By the late 19th century the Ottoman Empire was weak, and cheap imports from industrialised Europe and the effects of the disastrous Russo-Turkish War (1877–78) had resulted in the country's finances being controlled by the Ottoman Public Debt Administration, composed of and answerable to the Great Powers. The Europeans saw great potential to exploit the resources of the weakening empire, irrigation could transform agriculture, there were chromium, antimony, lead and zinc mines and some coal. Not least, there were potentially vast amounts of oil.

As early as 1871, a commission of experts studied the geology of the Tigris and Euphrates rivers and reported plentiful oil of good quality but commented that poor transportation made it doubtful that the fields could compete with those already operating in Russia and the United States. In 1901, a German report announced the region had a veritable "lake of petroleum" of almost inexhaustible supply.

In 1872, the German railway engineer Wilhelm von Pressel was retained by the Ottoman government to develop plans for railways in Turkey. However, private enterprise would not build the railway without subsidies and so the Ottoman government had to reserve part of its revenues to subsidise its construction and thus increase its debt to the European powers.

The process of constructing a rail line from Istanbul to Baghdad began in 1888, when Alfred von Kaulla, manager of Württembergische Vereinsbank, and Georg von Siemens, Managing Director of Deutsche Bank, created a syndicate and obtained a concession from Turkish leaders to extend the Haydarpaşa – İzmit railway to Ankara. Thus came into existence the Anatolian Railway Company (SCFOA, or ARC).

After the line to Ankara had been completed during December 1892, railway workshops were built in Eskişehir. and permission was obtained to construct a railway line from Eskişehir to Konya; the line was completed in July 1896. Both lines were the first two sections of the Baghdad railway. Another railway built at the same time by German engineers was the Hejaz railway, commissioned by Sultan Hamid II.

The Ottoman Empire chose to place the line outside the range of the guns of the British Navy. Therefore, the coastal way from Alexandretta to Aleppo was avoided. The line had to cross the Amanus Mountains inland at the cost of expensive engineering including an 8 km tunnel between Ayran station and Fevzipaşa.

== Baghdad Concession ==
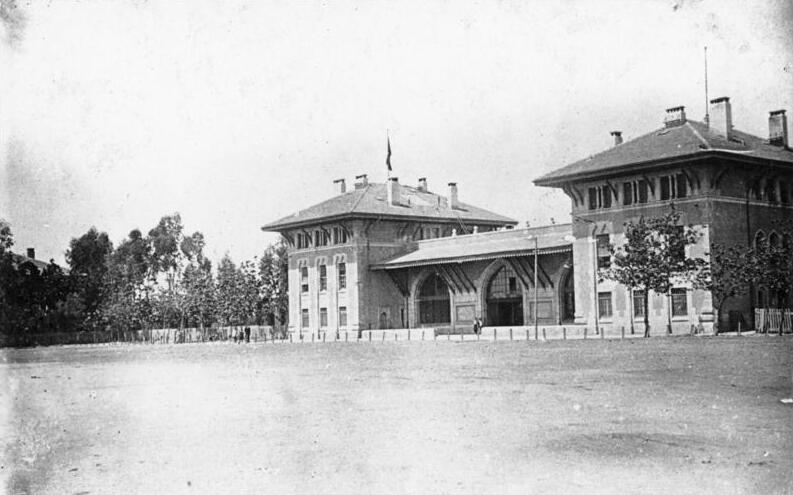
Central Station in Adana, Turkey, 1913

In 1898 and 1899, the Ottoman Ministry of Public Works received many applications for permission to construct a railway to Baghdad; it was not because of lack of competition that the Deutsche Bank was finally awarded the concession. A Russian plan was rejected for fear of it extending Russian influence in Istanbul. A well-financed British plan collapsed because of the outbreak of the Boer War. A well-financed French proposal, titled the Imperial Ottoman railway, enabled it to become financiers of the winning Deutsche Bank plan.

Other nations of Europe paid little attention to the building of the railway lines until 1903, when the Ottoman Government gave an Ottoman corporation permission to build the railway line from Konya to Baghdad. The Baghdad Railway Company was controlled by a few German banks. (McMurray rejects the theory that the railway tied Turkey to Germany.)

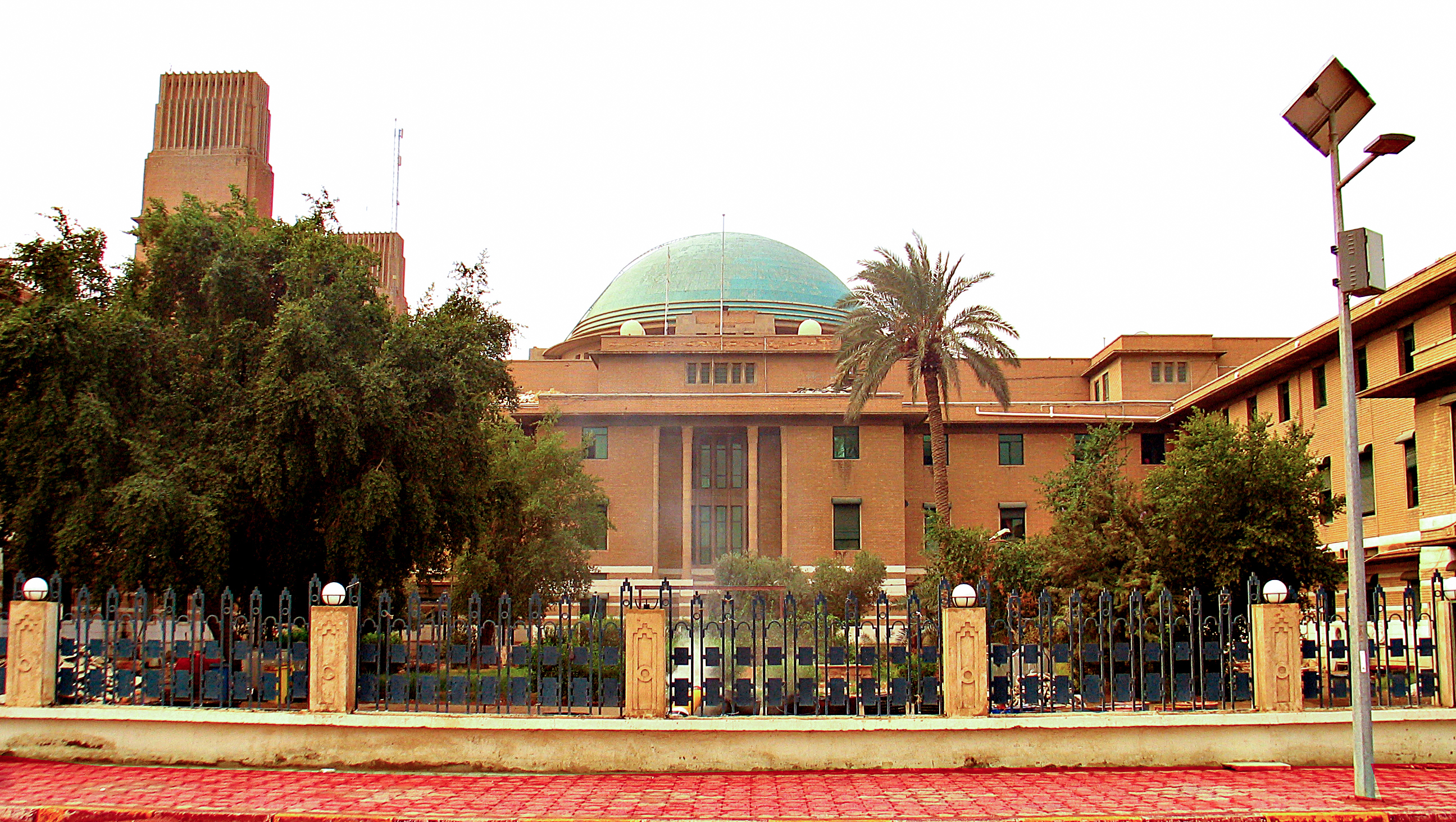
Baghdad Central Station, 2012

There was concern in Russia, France and the United Kingdom after 1903 as the implications of the German scheme to construct a great Berlin-Baghdad railway became apparent. A railway that would link Berlin to the Persian Gulf would provide Germany with a connection to its southernmost colonies in Africa: with German East Africa (present-day Rwanda and Burundi and the mainland part of Tanzania) and German South-West Africa (present-day Namibia less Walvis Bay). The railway might eventually have strengthened the Ottoman Empire and its ties to Germany to shift the balance of power in the region.

Despite obstructions at the diplomatic level, work slowly began on the railway. Both geographical and political obstacles prevented the completion of the Baghdad railway before World War I commenced in 1914. Much of the construction work was undertaken by Philipp Holzmann.

== Route ==
The railway passed through the following towns and places, NW to SE:

- Konya
- Anatolian table lands
- Karaman
- Ereğli
- The foothills of Taurus
- Cilician Gates
- Çukurova plain
- Yenice
- Adana
- Amanus range
- Rajo
- Aleppo
- Tell Abyad
- Nusaybin
- Mosul
- Baghdad
- Basra

The Adana – Yenice – Mersin railway existed prior to the construction of the Bagdad railway and was used for the latter in its Yenice–Adana section.

=== Modern line sections ===
Main lines

- Konya – Ulukışla – Yenice railway
- Adana – Yenice – Mersin railway
- Adana – Toprakkale – Fevzipaşa – Aleppo railway
- Aleppo – Karkamış – Şenyurt – Nusaybin railway
- Nusaybin – Qamishli – Al-Yaarubiyah railway (Rabia, Iraq connection)
- Baghdad – Baiji – Mosul – Rabia railway (IRR Northern Line) (Al-Yaarubiyah, Syria connection)

Branch lines

- Toprakkale – İskenderun railway
- Şenyurt – Mardin railway

Connected lines

- Eskişehir – Afyonkarahisar – Konya railway
- Fevzipaşa – Narlı – Yolçatı – Kurtalan railway
- Narlı – Karkamış railway
- Damascus – Hama – Aleppo railway
- Hama – Latakia railway
- Aleppo – Deir ez-Zor – Abu Kamal railway (Husaybah, Iraq connection)
- Deir ez-Zor – Qamishli railway
- Haditha – Baiji – Kirkuk railway (IRR Transversal Line)
- Baghdad – Al-Qa'im – Husaybah & Al-Qa'im – Akashat railway (IRR Western Line) (Abu Kamal, Syria connection)
- Baghdad – Basra high-speed railway (IRR Southern Line)

== British view of the railway ==
The initial reaction of the United Kingdom was one of strong support. A long article outlining the positive benefits of the enterprise appeared in Times. However, a plan for an extension from Basra towards the Persian Gulf faced opposition from the British and as a result, the emir of Kuwait refused to rent any storage facilities to the Germans.

The railway would eventually compete with British trade in Mesopotamia, but that would not happen for many years. However, in 1906, the Hamburg-American Steamship Line announced its intention to run regular steamships between Europe and the Persian Gulf. After a futile price war, the British lines, which had lost their monopoly, came to agreement in 1913 with their competitors and ended a rivalry that had caused considerable political concern.

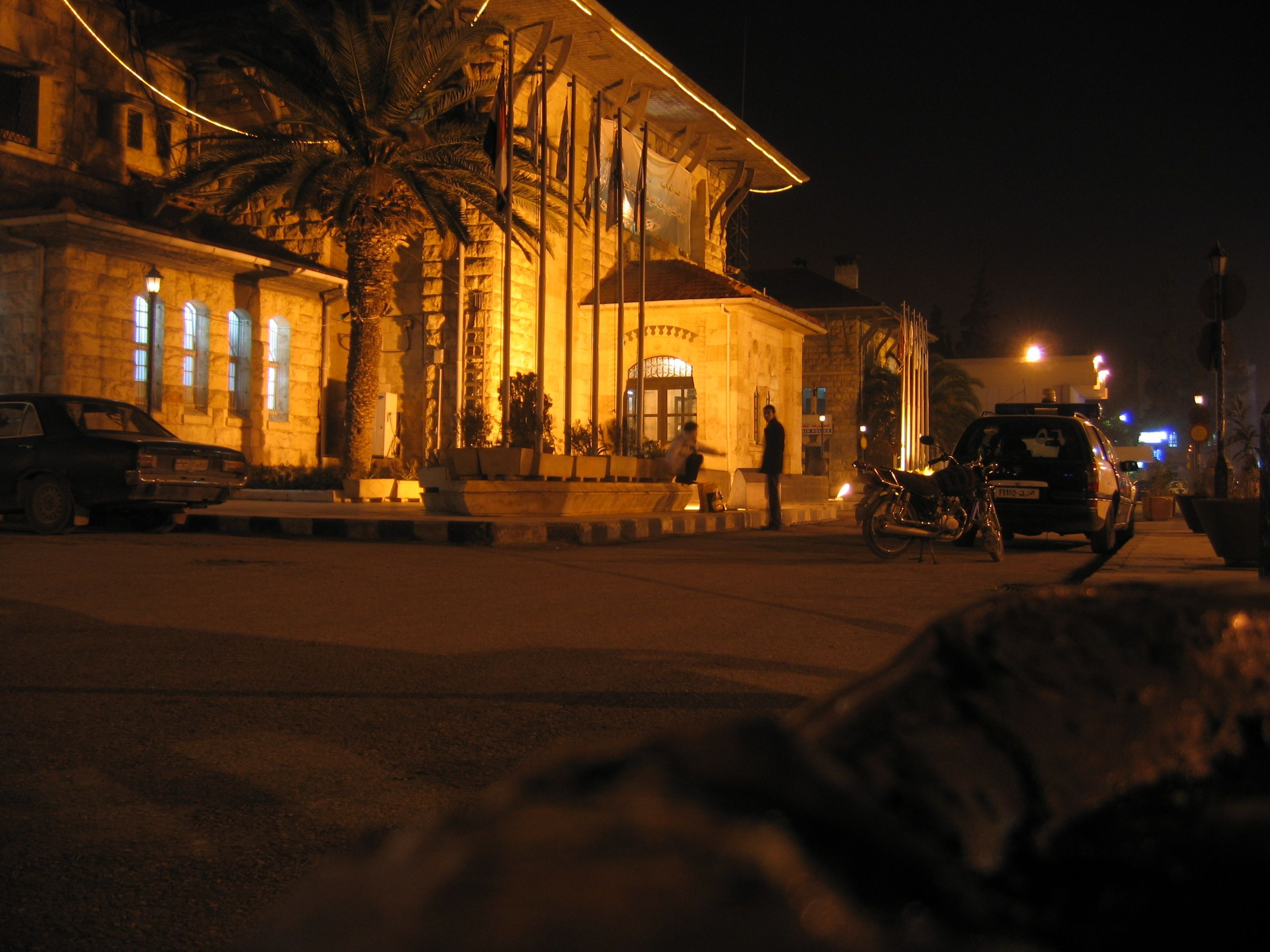
Railway station, Aleppo, Syria

In 1911 the railway company looked to build a branch line to Alexandretta from Aleppo to pick up on the valuable trade of Northern Syria and the Northern Mesopotamian valley. However, the Young Turk government could not offer further railway concessions without raising customs duties from 11 to 14 per cent. Such a raise required the agreement of all powers but was vetoed by Britain after Sir Edward Grey spoke in the House of Commons: "if the money is to be used to promote railways which may be a source of doubtful advantage to British trade.... I say it will be impossible for us to agree to that increase... ".

The British realised that the railways would be slightly too close to their oilfields in Persia. They were worried that the Young Turks could block off oil supplies vital for the Royal Navy.

The main British commercial interest that the British government insisted be protected, was that of the Right Honourable James Lyle Mackay, Baron Inchcape of Strathnaver. As well as being the foremost shipping magnate of the British Empire, Lord Inchcape was a director of the Anglo-Persian Oil Company and of the D'Arcy Exploration Company. On 23 February a contract was signed in London between Lord Inchcape and the Baghdad Railway Company. In March 1914, the German government was obliged to recognise southern Mesopotamia, as well as central and southern Persia, as the exclusive field of operations of the Anglo-Persian Oil Company.

== Russian view of the railway ==
The Russians also opposed the railway, being concerned about the territories in the Caucasus. Russian support for the railway was achieved only in 1910, when in a meeting with Tsar Nicholas II and German Emperor Wilhelm II assured that no lines were planned into Kurdish or Armenian areas.

== Role in origins of World War I ==
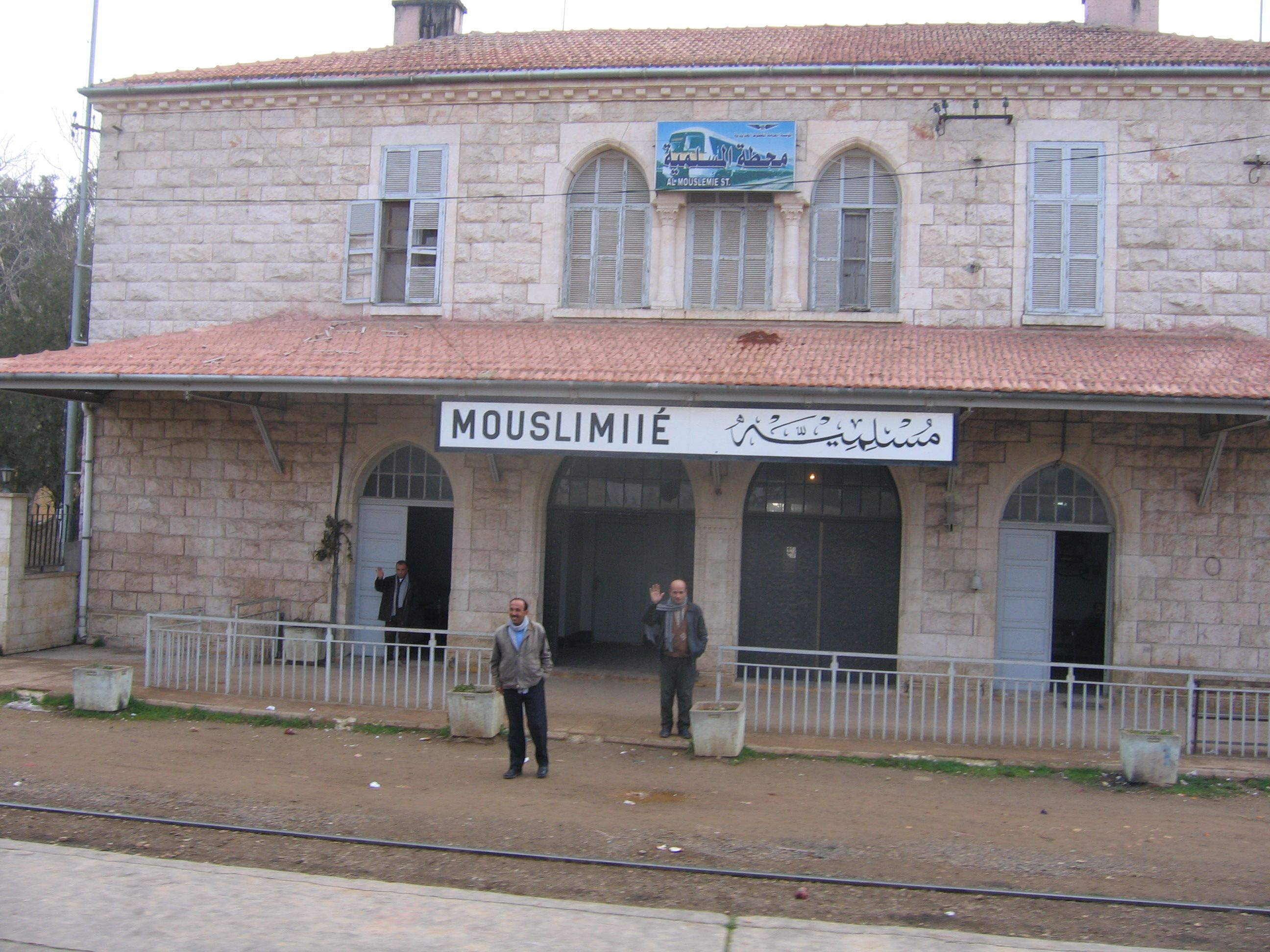
Railway station Mouslimie Junction north of Aleppo, Syria, where the line branched to Istanbul and Baghdad

Discussion of the railway's role as a contributing factor to the outbreak of war is complicated by two issues:

Firstly, historians and political analysts who wrote about this issue directly after the war were not in possession of closed diplomatic records, an important piece and perspective on the historical record. Diplomatic documents of the German government were released between 1922 and 1927, British documents between 1926 and 1938. Only some Russian documents were released, and Italian documents came out only after World War II.

Marxist historians emphasise imperial rivalries and economics as the driving force for the war, as was popularly reported with respect to the railway at the time and especially as revealed in the Russian diplomatic documents. Regardless of diplomacy, financing and agreements and later points of view, the existence of the railway would have created a threat to British dominance over German trade, as it would have given German industry access to oil and a port in the Persian Gulf. The importance of oil as opposed to coal as fuel was recognised, as it could greatly improve the performance and capacity of the rival navies. The recognised strategic importance is seen by the wartime presence of the British there and by the earlier establishment of the Sheikdom of Kuwait as an autonomous kaza (district) of the Ottoman Empire and a de facto protectorate of Great Britain by the Anglo-Ottoman Convention of 1913 to block northern access to the Persian Gulf.

Other historians have argued that the sum of many other issues, including intractable nationalities and the denial of self-determination to minority groups, were the dominant causes of World War I. They argue that although the railway issue was heated before 1914 (Corrigan shows that the railway issue was driving Germany and the Ottomans apart), conservative Anglo-American historians argue that it was not a cause of World War I since the main controversies had been addressed in principle before the war started.

Some of the optimism should be attributed to the willingness of the German government to compose long-standing differences... and in June 1914 a settlement was achieved over the Baghdad railway.

Many economic and colonial issues which had been causing friction between French, German and British governments before 1914, such as the financing of the Berlin-Baghdad railway and the future disposition of the Portuguese colonies, had been resolved by the summer of 1914.

Eventually an agreement over the Baghdad railway issue was reached between Britain and the Ottoman Government in 1913 in the following terms: First, there should be no differential treatment on any railway in Asiatic Turkey; second, two British representatives approved by HMG should be admitted to the Board of the Baghdad Railway Company; third, the terminus of the railway should be at Basra; last, no railway should be constructed from Basra to the Gulf without the sanction of HMG, which speaks to the importance of the issue. This was followed by an Anglo-German agreement on the similar lines in London on 15 June 1914. However these agreements, reached just prior to the outbreak of the Great War, were not realised.

However, war began on 1 August 1914 – and one day later the secret treaty establishing the Ottoman-German Alliance was signed, perhaps giving credence to the notion that the issue had not been fully resolved. In fact, restriction of German access to Mesopotamia and its oil, and strategic exclusion from rail access to the Persian Gulf, was enforced by British military presence during World War I, and afterwards in the Treaty of Versailles by removal of the would-be Baghdad railway from German ownership and the transfer to France of the German-held 25% stake in the Turkish Petroleum Company in the San Remo Oil Agreement of 1920. Thus the potential consequences to Anglo-German economic rivalry in oil and trade by the existence of the railway were ultimately addressed by ownership and outright control, rather than by agreement. Marxist historians, unpopular in the Anglo-American perspective on process, would suggest that economic contexts, rather than nationalistic and political rivalries, underlie the root causes.

== During World War I ==
By 1915, the railway ended some 80 kilometres (50 mi) east of Diyarbakır. Another spur, heading east from Aleppo, ended at Nusaybin. Additionally, some rail was laid starting in Baghdad and reaching north to Tikrit and south to Kut. That left a gap of some 480 kilometres (300 miles) between the railway lines. Additionally, there were three mountains that the railway was going to pass, but the tunnels through the three mountains were not complete. Thus, the railway had four different sections at the start of the war. The total time to get from Istanbul to Baghdad during the war was 22 days. The total distance was 2,020 kilometres (1,260 mi)

The breaks in the railway meant that the Ottoman government had significant difficulties in sending supplies and reinforcements to the Mesopotamian Front. The fighting in Mesopotamia remained somewhat isolated from the rest of the war. During the conflict, Ottoman and German workers, together with Allied prisoners of war, laboured to complete the railway for military purposes but with limited manpower. With many more important things to spend money on, only two of the gaps were closed.

The first use of railways for genocide occurred in early 1915, when Armenian women and children from Zeitun were deported on trains to Konya and later marched into the Syrian Desert. Many Armenians were deported via the railways and later killed in the course of the Armenian genocide.

== After World War I ==
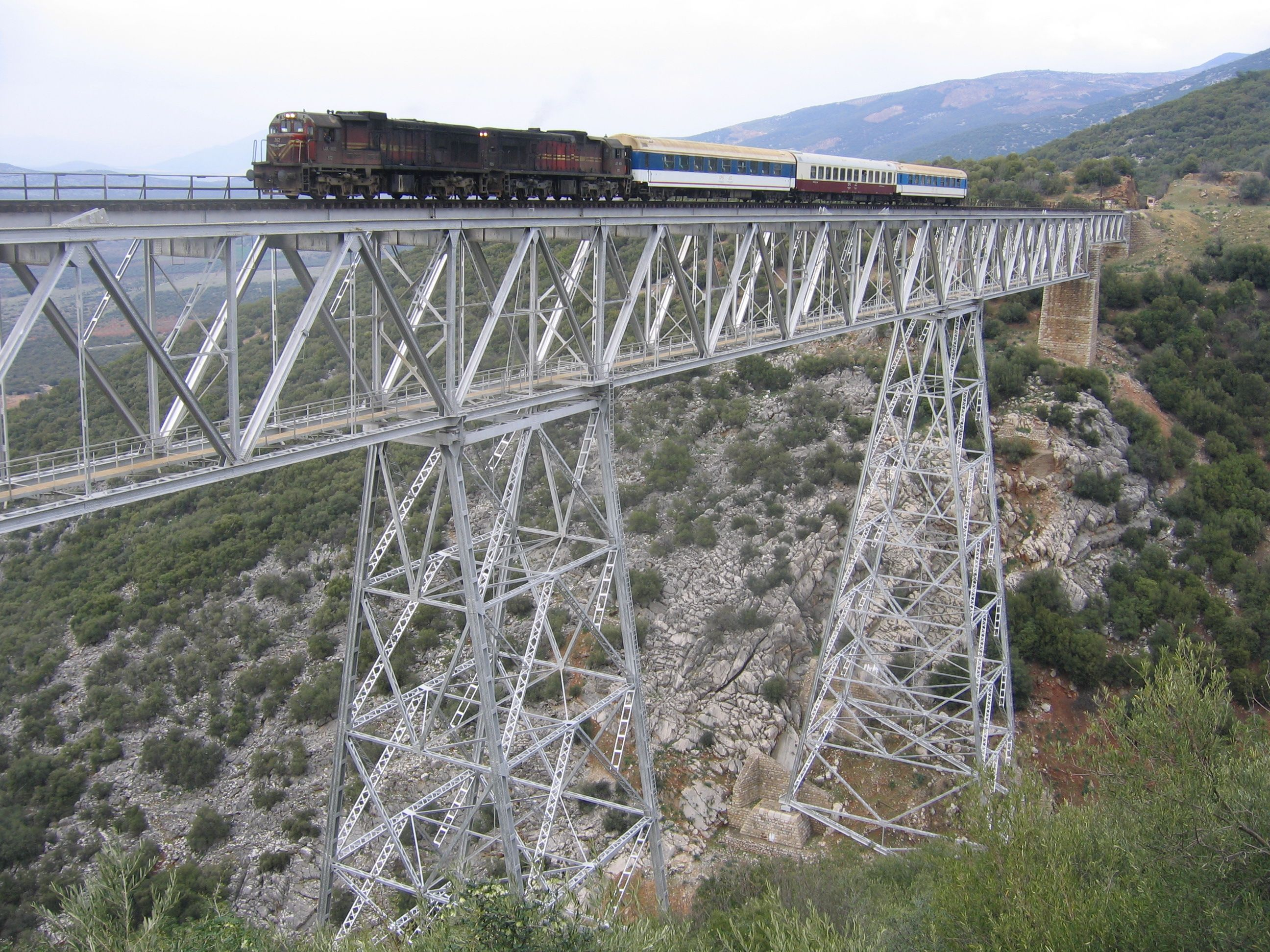
Railway passes varied landscapes: bridge between the Turkish/Syrian border station Meydan Ekbez and the junction Mouslemiye

In 1919, the Treaty of Versailles cancelled all German rights to the Baghdad railway, but the Deutsche Bank transferred its holdings to a Swiss bank.

The Treaty of Ankara (1921) established the Syria–Turkey border as running along the railway track from Al-Rai in the west to Nusaybin in the east, with the border being on the Syrian side of the track, leaving the track in Turkish territory. Further west, the Treaty also set the border immediately north of the town and railway station of Meidan Ekbis.

People in Turkey, Italy, France and Britain created various arrangements that gave a certain degree of control over the Baghdad railway to various indistinct interests in those nations. Investors, speculators and financiers were involved by 1923 in secretive and clandestine ways.

The British Army had completed the southeastern section from Baghdad to Basra and so that part was under British control. The French held negotiations to obtain some degree of control over the central portion of the railway, and Turkish interests controlled the oldest sections that had been constructed inside of Turkey, but talks continued to be held after 1923. The United States involvement in the Near East began in 1923 when Turkey approved the Chester concession, which aroused disapprovals from France and the United Kingdom.

In 1930, a passenger service by road was introduced to bridge the missing section of line between Nusaybin and Kirkuk. At different times, the service used Rolls-Royce cars and Thornycroft buses.

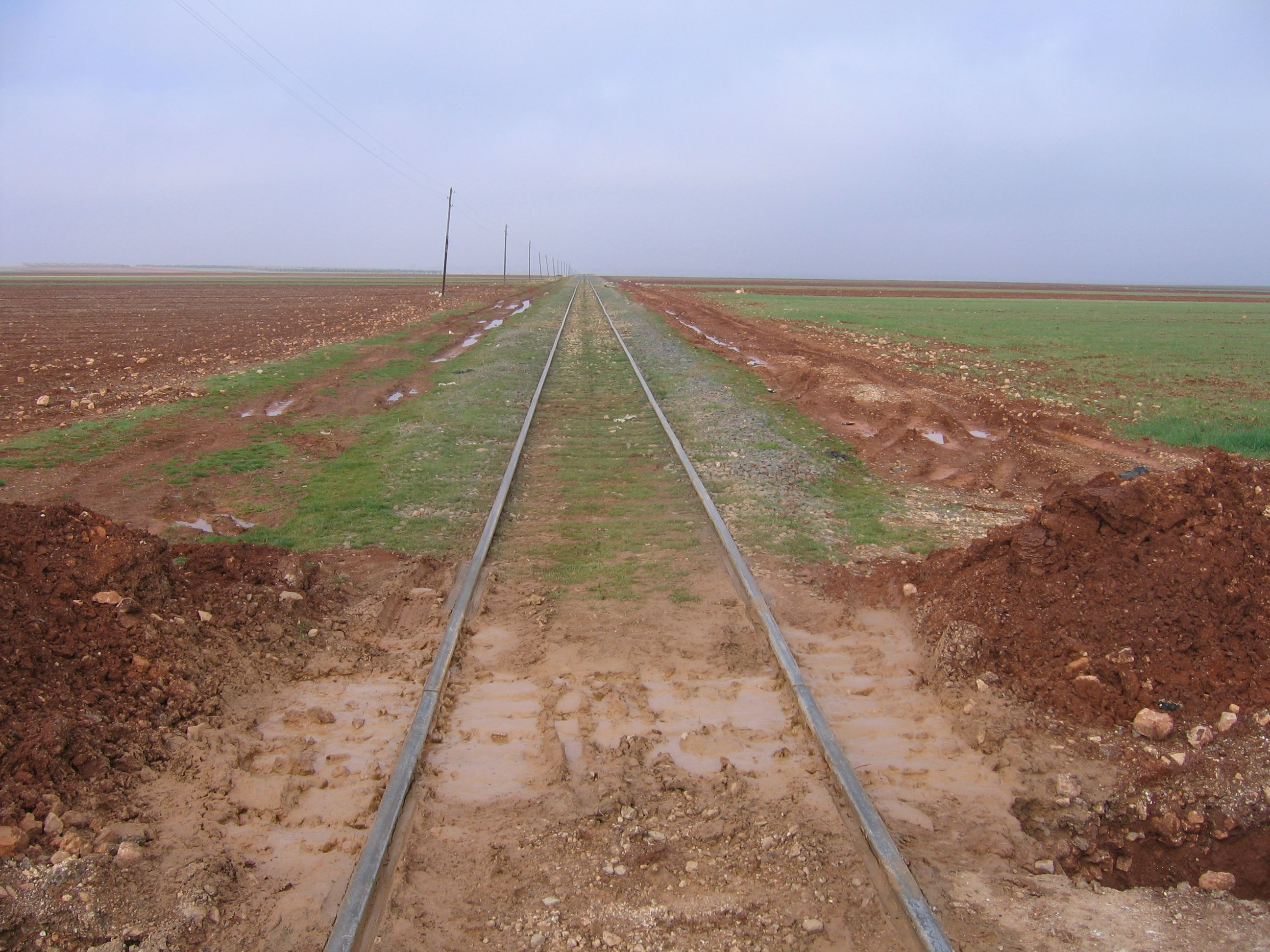
Railway passes varied landscapes: the plains north of Aleppo, Syria

In 1932, the Kingdom of Iraq became independent from the British. In 1936, Iraq bought all railways in its territory from the British and started building the missing section of line from Tel Kotchek to Baiji (a short stretch of the missing 290 miles was on Syrian soil beginning at Nusaybin). Oil had been discovered in the area that was too heavy for efficient pipeline transport. On 15 July 1940, the railway was completed, and two days later, the Taurus Express made its first complete journey between Istanbul and Baghdad. In that year, the Robert Stephenson and Hawthorns locomotive works in Britain built a class of streamlined Pacific steam locomotives to haul the Taurus Express between Baghdad and Tel Kotchek. These were delivered to Iraqi State Railways in 1941 and entered service as the PC class.

A new standard gauge railway opened between Baghdad and Basra for freight traffic in 1964 and for freight in 1968. It was also used for passenger traffic at least into the 1970's. That replaced a metre gauge line built in 1920 and for the first time connected the Bosphorus with the Persian Gulf without a break of gauge. The strained relations between Turkey, Syria and Iraq, however, has caused continuous traffic to remain rare, and other means of transport soon reduced its strategic and economic relevance.

== Current situation ==
- Most of the line is in a usable condition and Robinson's World Rail Atlas (2006) shows it as intact.
- Most of the stations are still original.
- The part between Toprakkale and Narlı, in Turkey, has been electrified for heavy ore transport.
- The right-of-way of the railway marks the border between Syria and Turkey for over 350 km, from Al-Rai station in the West to Nusaybin in the east, with the rail line on the Turkish side squeezed between the minefields and control strip in Turkey and Syria.
- On 16 February 2010 the link between Mosul in Iraq and Gaziantep in Turkey was reopened. The first train went from Mosul to Gaziantep, taking 18 hours. On 18 February a return journey departed from Gaziantep to Mosul. This line has now closed once again. There are limited train services between Baghdad and Basra until new trains are delivered.

== See also ==
- Iraqi Republic Railways
