= Wilhelm von Pressel =

German engineer (1821–1902)

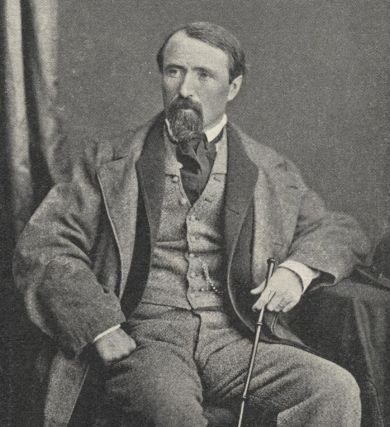
- Born: 1821; Stuttgart
- Died: 1902; Turkey
- Education: unknown
- Occupation: Engineer

Wilhelm von Pressel (1821–1902) was a German official and railway engineer to the Ottoman Empire who attempted to acquire funding for the Baghdad Railway. His previous rail constructions included lines in the Balkans and across Europe. He believed himself a global citizen and is often called the "Father of the Baghdad Railway".

== German and Turkish railways ==
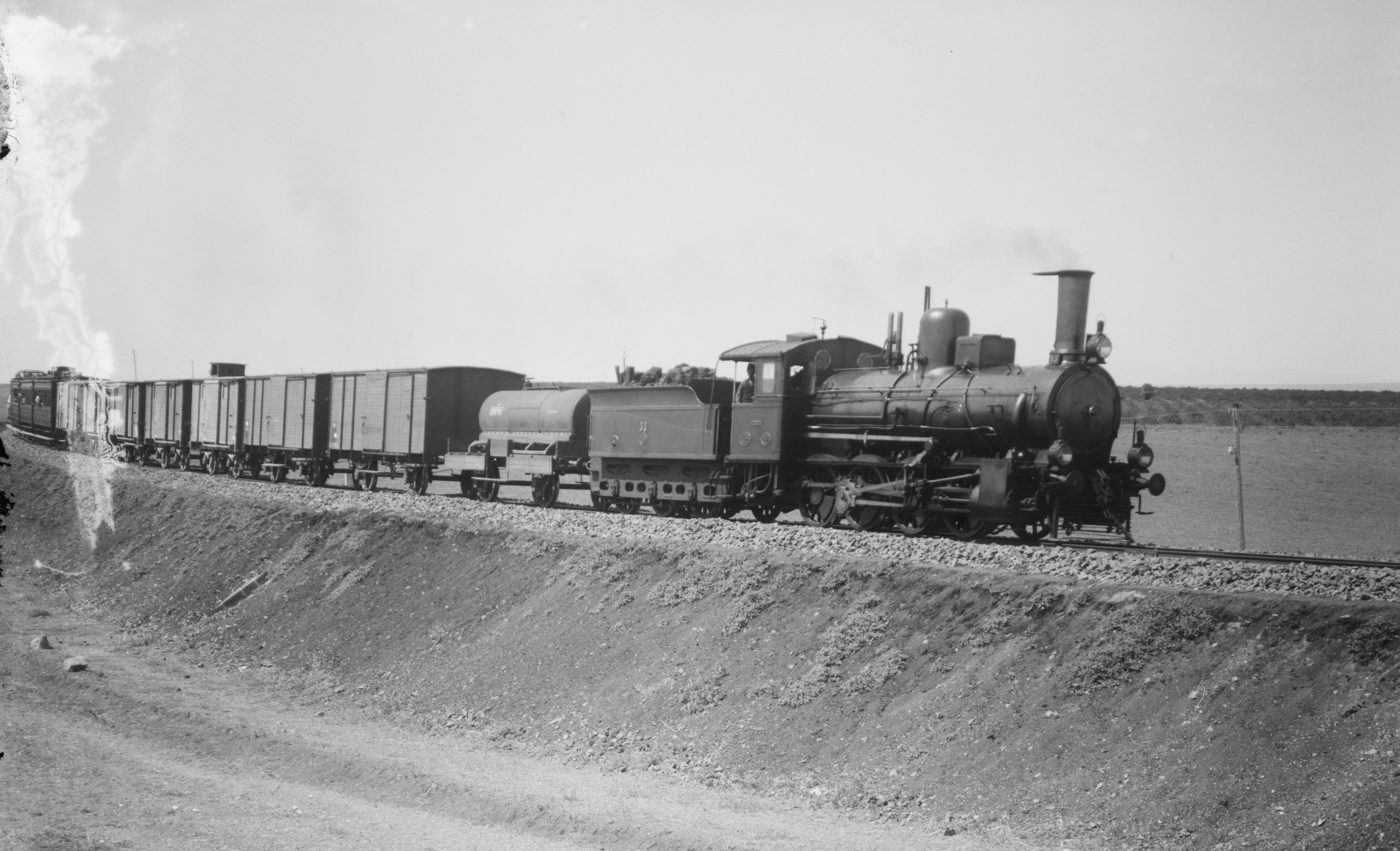
Baghdad railway circa 1900-1910

Of European powers that included Britain and France, Germany provided the most significant foreign aid to the Ottoman Empire in its state of 19th and 20th century decline. Pressel and Colmar Freiherr von der Goltz, a military adviser, were the leaders of initiating contact to raise funds. They went as ambassadors to Istanbul in order to promote Turco-German collaboration. Pressel and Goltz spent time touring the country and learning its customs; after this, they made the Railway their top priority, believing that improving the state of the Turkish people would benefit both the Ottoman Empire and Germany. In 1871, Pressel was appointed director of the new Asian Ottoman Railway Company.

Although the Ottoman government, the Porte, was financially unable to build what would later be the Baghdad Railway, Pressel succeeded in building Turkey's first railroad, which connected Istanbul to Izmit on the Marmara Sea. Pressel made it his goal to improve the antiquated methods of transportation available in the Ottoman Empire. However, the Porte declared bankruptcy in 1875, hindering his plans. In the late 1870s, Pressel succeeded in convincing Sultan Abdul Hamid II that the Baghdad Railway needed to be built. The sultan's concession was, in part, to improve morale after the crushing defeat by the Russians in 1877–78.

== Cultural interest ==
At this time, Pressel endeavored to learn more about the culture of the Turks; rumors abounded of torture and barbarism, especially toward Ottoman Christians, a minority. He found these rumors to be true; the perpetrators of various crimes against the Christians were often government officials, so their plight seemingly had no end. As Pressel continued to learn about the Turks, he disliked Turkish officials more and more. The majority of Turks "were honest and brave and treated their fellow Christian citizens 'with mildness and friendliness.'" On the other hand, Turkish officials were caught between the modern and traditional, hypocritical, and soon came to disgust Pressel.

At this time, Pressel pressured both Berlin and Istanbul to get the railway project off the ground, even going to would-be financiers praising "the richness of Anatolia". While many Europeans thought the Turks lazy, Pressel argued that their lack of productivity stemmed from lack of external transport, thus no outside market for goods. The railway would increase productivity by allowing Anatolian farmers to increase their harvest and export some of it.

== Beginnings of the Baghdad Railway ==
Between 1883 and 1887, Pressel had accumulated enough capital to support the railroad, but the sultan rejected it because the capital came from too many sources. Soon, though, Pressel met Alfred von Kaulla, the director of the private Wurttemburger Vereinsbank, who introduced him to Georg von Siemens, director of the Deutsche Bank. Although Bismarck officially rejected the "Pressel Project" on behalf of the German government (although he personally approved of it), Kaulla and Siemens submitted their own bid to the sultan, who accepted. Pressel, though, felt that he had been betrayed and shunted off when Kaulla and Siemens took over; Siemens in particular hated Pressel for his humanitarian nature.

== Later life ==
Pressel decided to live out his days in Turkey, arguing for the complete Ottoman takeover of the project, writing: "I have decided to fight for my project against the superior strength of my opponents as long as God gives me the strength, until my last breath, like a lioness for her cubs. Because I have the right to call the Anatolian Railway my child." The official German dispatch refused to give him an obituary, and his opponents continued to slander him.

== Bibliography ==
- McMurray, Jonathan S. (2001). Distant Ties: Germany, the Ottoman Empire, and the Construction of the Baghdad Railway. ISBN 0-275-97063-9.
