= Ein El-Bayda, Idlib =

Ein El-Bayda, Idlib عين البيضا
- Village
- Location in Syria
- Country: Syria
- Governorate: Idlib
- District: Jisr al-Shughur District
- Subdistrict: Bidama Nahiyah

Population (2004)
  - Total: 405
- Time zone: UTC+2 (EET)
  - Summer (DST): UTC+3 (EEST)
- City Qrya Pcode: C4229

Ein El-Bayda, Idlib (Arabic: عين البيضا) is a Syrian village located in Bidama Nahiyah in Jisr al-Shughur District, Idlib. According to the Syria Central Bureau of Statistics (CBS), Ein El-Bayda, Idlib had a population of 405 in the 2004 census.
