= IRR Western Line =

Railway Line in Iraq

The IRR Western Line, alternatively Baghdad-Huseyba/Qaim-Akashat Railway(s) (Route Number 3) is a railway line of the Iraqi Republic Railways (IRR) that connects Akashat and Qaim with Baghdad via Ramadi and Falluja. It is mostly a single-track unelectrified line, with some sections from Sheikh Dari to Mufraq Rutba double-tracked. The line is about 520 km (320 mi) long and has a maximum speed of 100 km/h (62 mph). The line features two of the three Iraqi regular passenger rail services—the commuter lines between Baghdad and Falluja or Ramadi, the third being the Baghdad-Basra Service.

Map of the IRR Western Line.

== Technical specifications ==
The Railway Line had a fully automatic relay system since 1986, near the end of construction of the eastern portion of the Line. The Line featured a network of sound cables that provided communication between stations and locomotives or to other stations. As of October 2018, the signalling and communication systems are out of service.

Along the line, five light maintenance workshops at Baghdad, Falluja, Ramadi, Haqlaniya and Akashat and two heavy maintenance factories at Qaim and Baghdad were built.

The track gauge is standard-gauge (1435 millimetres), the gauge used on all Iraqi Railways since the 1984 closure of the Baghdad-Erbil Railway. The rails have a UIC 60 profile with welded joints designed for high-speed and heavy freight services. The axle load is 25 tons. The sleepers are made of precast concrete, with nearly 4,000 glued insulated joints.

Due to significant damage sustained during conflicts, operators are required to exercise caution, which limits the operational speed to a maximum of 100 km/h, often even below that.

"The rails, stations, equipment, bridges and tunnels have sustained damage of more than 90 percent"

— Taleb Jawad Kazem, deputy director general of Iraq's railways

The construction process involved the stabilisation of compressive soils over a stretch of 50 kilometres (31 mi) to prevent track subsidence. Additionally, foundational reinforcement was necessary for both the railway and the adjacent highway bridges. The largest undertaking to facilitate construction was the act of relocating the Lake Habbaniya dam.

== History ==
Construction of the 144 km Akashat-Qaim stretch began in the summer of 1981 and was completed by February 1982, with 5 stations along the route. Construction of the 376 km section from Huseyba to Baghdad, which included 23 stations and passed through more densely populated areas, began in November 1982 and was completed by 1987. The line's construction happened entirely within the timeframe of the Iraq-Iran war. Despite occasional delays due to the war, construction proceeded relatively smoothly, as the project site was located far from the frontlines. The construction of the Akashat Branch was officially stated to be intended for transporting phosphate by employees of the IRR. However, there are claims it was also used for the transportation of yellowcake from the Akashat uranium mine to a Swiss-built uranium enrichment facility in Qaim. It was believed that weapons of mass destruction (WMDs), including nuclear materials and mustard gas, might have been processed in Qaim using minerals from Akashat and surrounding areas during Saddam Hussein's pursuit of WMDs. However, no WMDs were found after the Iraq War.

From 2022 to 2024, trains heading to Qaim and Akashat were able to get there through the reconstructed detour over Baiji to Baghdad, which added over 100 km (62 mi) to the original journey (Baghdad-Falluja-Qaim=375km; Baghdad-Baiji-Qaim=500km).

== Operations and recent developments ==
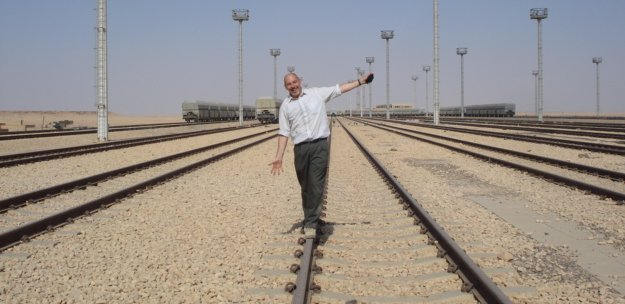
A man standing on the Tracks of the Akashat Railway Yard

A daily commuter rail line currently spans the 65-kilometre distance from Baghdad to Falluja. Trains start the trip to the capital at 6:45 am and return at 3:00 pm. On average, 250 passengers take the journey from Baghdad to Falluja every day. Tickets for the Falluja Train are relatively cheap, even for Iraqi standards, with a one-way fare costing 2000 IQD or 1.5 USD.

With the addition of the daily 120 kilometres (75 mi) Ramadi train, two lines now operate on the railway. Trains leave Ramadi at 6 am and return from Baghdad at 3:30 pm. The Train to Ramadi costs 4000 dinar and the Train leaving Ramadi 5000 dinar. First-class options cost 2000 dinar extra. Each train can carry 350 passengers. On the way, trains stop in Falluja.

Even though new trains have been bought, the line still doesn't operate the 72 trains a day it did during its heyday.

The temporary detour via Baiji became unnecessary following the reconstruction of the Railway Bridge, which had interrupted service for 20 years, and forced trains to terminate at Falluja. After this hiatus, marked by political instability, terrorism and corruption, the reconstruction of the aforementioned bridge was completed. The reopening ceremony took place on October 8th, in conjunction with the 'Year of Achievements' project launched by the Iraqi Prime Minister. Passenger service to Ramadi began on October 11, 2024. Services continuing further on to Qaim are expected to resume by the end of 2024, according to information by the Transportation Ministry.
