= Meidan Ekbis =

Meidan Ekbis ميدان اكبس
- Village
- Location within Syria
- Coordinates: 36°49′12″N 36°40′38″E
- Country: Syria
- Governorate: Aleppo Governorate
- District: Afrin District
- Nahiyah: Rajo

Population (2004 census)
  - Total: 1,302
- Time zone: UTC+3 (AST)

Meidan Ekbis (Arabic: ميدان اكبس) or Maydan Ikbis or Midan Akbas, is a town in northern Syria, administratively part of the Afrin District of Aleppo Governorate, located north of Aleppo. Nearby localities include Afrin and Rajo to the south. The town lies on the Syria–Turkey border and is a stop on the main railroad crossing into Turkey on the Baghdad Railway and Istanbul-Aleppo-Damascus line. According to the Syria Central Bureau of Statistics, Meidan Ekbis had a population of 1,302 in the 2004 census. By late July 2013, People's Protection Units (YPG) fighters controlled the town. On February 25, 2018, the village came under the control of the Syrian National Army.

== In Pop Culture ==
In Khaled Khalifa's No Knives in the Kitchens of This City (2013), Meidan Ekibs is mentioned as the hometown of the main family, which they left to move to Aleppo, Syria.
