= Yunesiyeh =

Yunesiyeh اليونسية
- Village
- Location in Syria
- Coordinates: 35°47′56″N 36°9′40″E
- Country: Syria
- Governorate: Idlib
- District: Jisr al-Shughur District
- Subdistrict: Bidama Nahiyah

Population (2004)
  - Total: 1,318
- Time zone: UTC+2 (EET)
  - Summer (DST): UTC+3 (EEST)
- City Qrya Pcode: C4225

Yunesiyeh (Arabic: اليونسية) is a Syrian village located in Bidama Nahiyah in Jisr al-Shughur District, Idlib. According to the Syria Central Bureau of Statistics (CBS), Yunesiyeh had a population of 1,318 in the 2004 census.

== Syrian Civil War ==
On 9 November 2015, an IDP camp was attacked with cluster bombs by the Syrian government, killing seven people and wounding another forty-three.
