= Syria–Turkey barrier =

Border barrier between Syria and Turkey

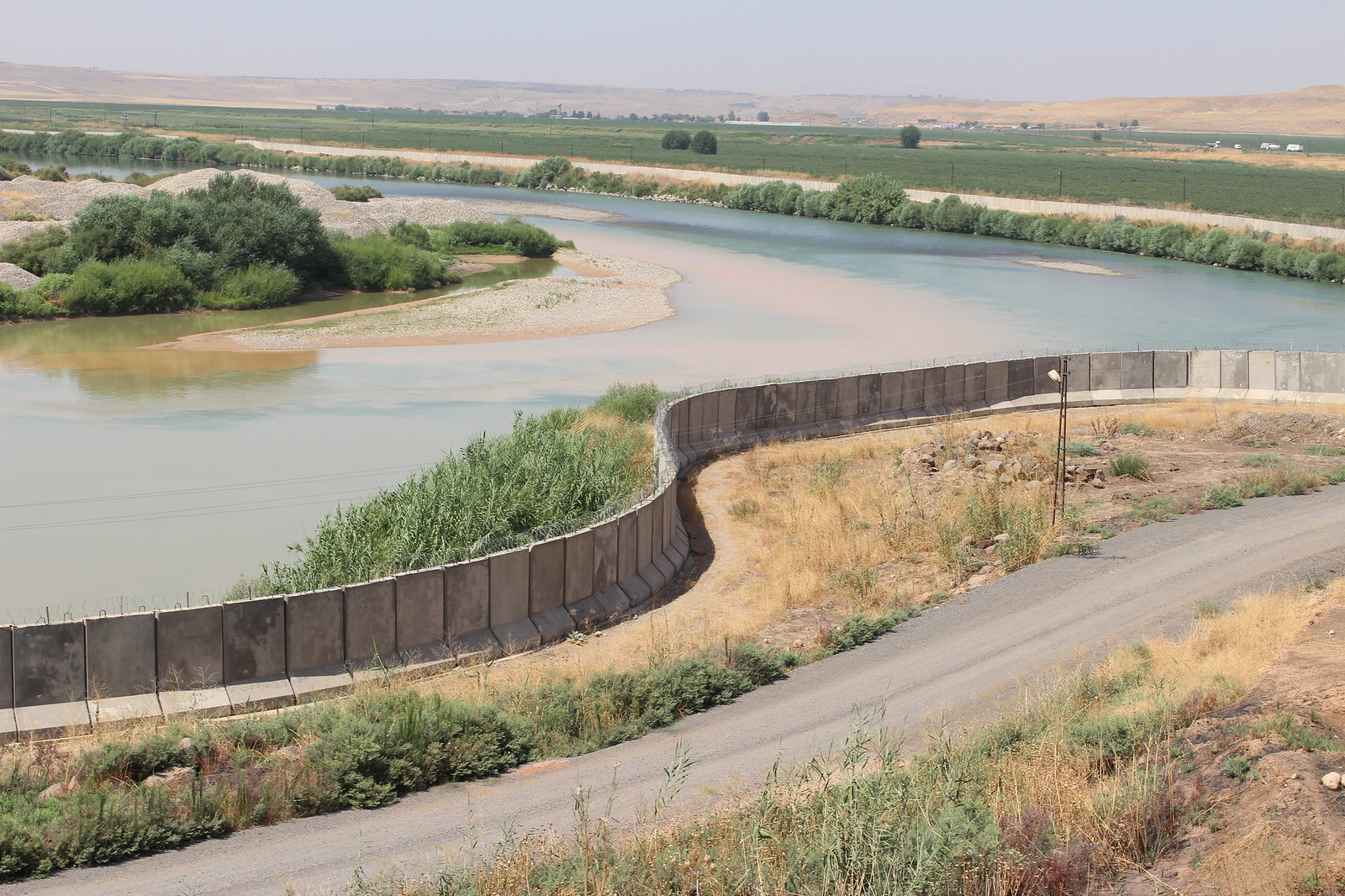
Turkey-Syria Barrier

The Syria–Turkey barrier is a border wall and fence under construction along the Syria–Turkey border built in an attempt at preventing illegal crossings and smuggling from Syria into Turkey.

The barrier on the Syrian border is the third longest wall in the world after the Great Wall of China and the Mexico-United States border wall.

== Background ==
According to Turkish officials the border wall was built in an attempt to increase border security, combat smuggling and reduce illegal border crossings due to the Syrian civil war.

== History ==
Ankara had launched the construction project in 2015 to increase border security.

The 828 km (515-mile) wall is being built by TOKI, Turkey's state-owned construction enterprise, and will comprise Turkey's entire border with Syria. It will be made of seven-tonne concrete blocks topped with razor wire and stand three metres (9.8 feet) high and two metres (6.6 feet) wide; it will include 120 border towers in critical locations and a security road with regular military patrols. With construction having begun in 2014, 781 km of the border wall has been completed as of December 2017. In June 2018, the wall was proclaimed to be finished with a length of 764-kilometer (475-mile) out of the 911 km Syrian-Turkish border. In 2017, The Syrian government accused Turkey of building a separation wall, referring to this barrier.

== Specifics ==
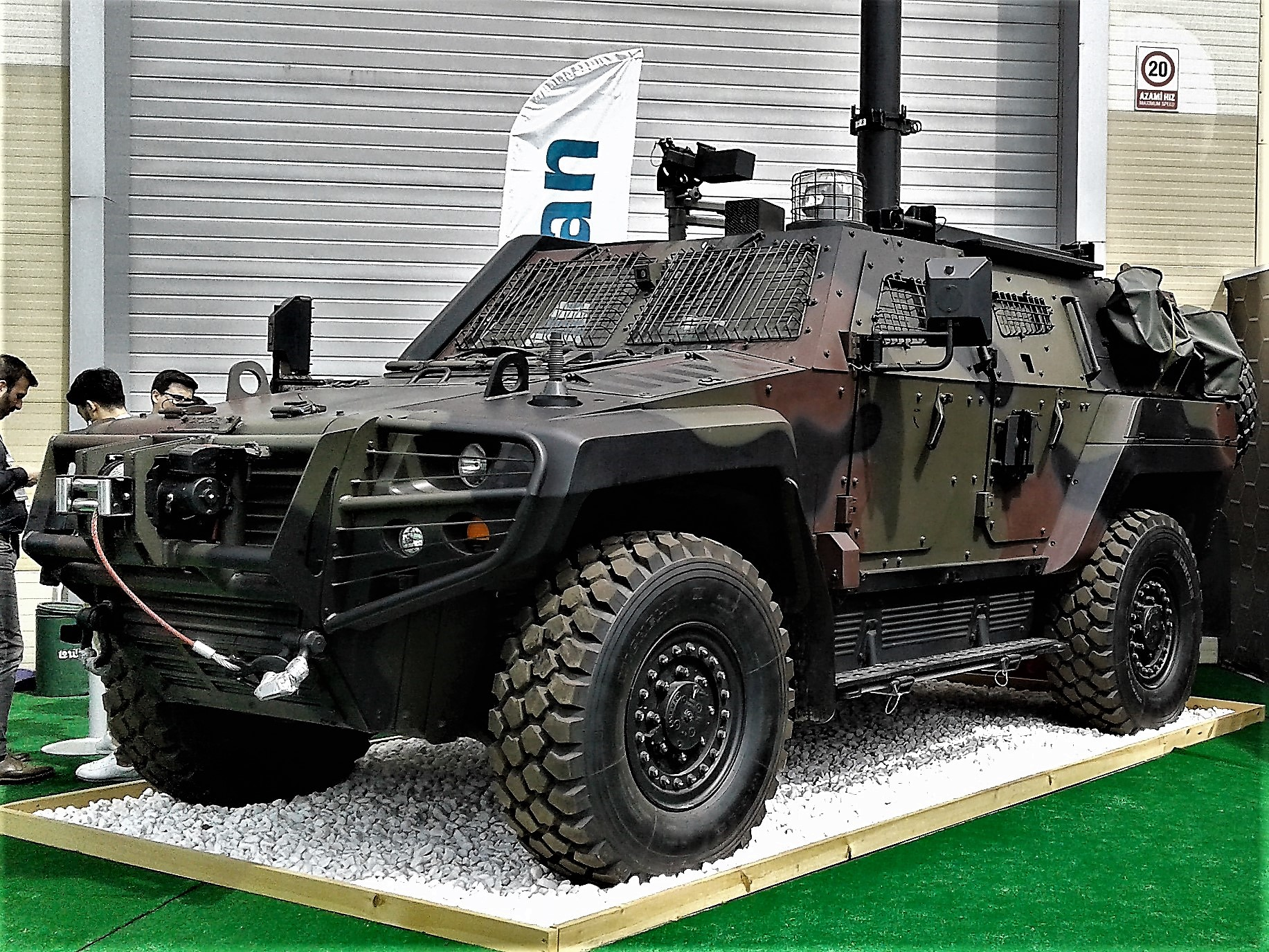
Turkey's armored Cobra II is used to patrol the Turkish side of the border wall.

The physical specifics are such as :

- base element: 2m wide, 7-tons mobile concrete blocks
- height : 3m concrete + 1m razor wire
- length : 764 km
- sealed along : Hatay, Kilis, Gaziantep, Mardin, Şırnak, Şanlıurfa, as of June 2018,

The border security includes :

- the modular concrete walls
- security patrol routes with regular military patrols
- security towers, manned and unmanned
- passenger tracks.

Electronic devices are used, such as :

- close-up surveillance systems
- thermal cameras
- land surveillance radar
- remote-controlled weapons systems
- command-and-control centers
- line-length imaging systems
- seismic sensors
- acoustic sensors.

The advanced technology layer includes :

- wide area surveillance
- laser destructive fiber-optic detection
- surveillance radar for drone detection
- jammers
- short-distance movement-sensitive lighting systems.

The barrier was expected to include 120 border towers in critical locations.

The construction of Turkey's armored Cobra II military vehicles, which are now being used to patrol the border to Syria, has been funded by the European Union.

== Geography and size ==
781 km of the border wall has been completed as of December 2017, the whole 911 km is expected to be completed by Spring 2018.

== Separation barrier and incursion into Syria controversy ==
In 2017, the Syrian government accused Turkey of building a separation wall, referring to the barrier. Syrian Foreign Ministry officials claimed Turkish forces and border control guards brought in heavy machines and trucks into Syrian territories, particularly in the northern countryside of Hasakah province, making a dirt road and digging a trench while installing cement pillars to build a separation wall. Turkish forces were also claimed to enter the Syrian territory at a depth of 250 meters in the northern countryside of Aleppo province. The Turkish forces also repeated the move in the northwestern province of Idlib, saying that the Turkish forces captured 2.4 hectares of lands with the same aim to build the wall. Syrian regime officials have stated that any unilateral international actions without the consent of the Syrian government will be dealt with as violations to Syria's sovereignty.

== See also ==
- Turkey–Iran border barrier
- Mexico–United States barrier
