= Rail transport in Iraq =

Operation
- National railway: Iraqi Republic Railways

Statistics
- Passenger-distance: 99.98 Million (2010)

System length
- Total: 2,272 kilometres (1,412 mi)

Track gauge
- Main: 4 ft 8 1/2 in (1,435 mm) standard gauge

Features
- No. of tunnels: 1 (Mosul Railway Tunnel)
- Tunnel length: 912 metres (2,992 ft)
- Longest bridge: Hindiya Railway Bridge(1,250 metres (4,100 ft))
- No. of stations: 107

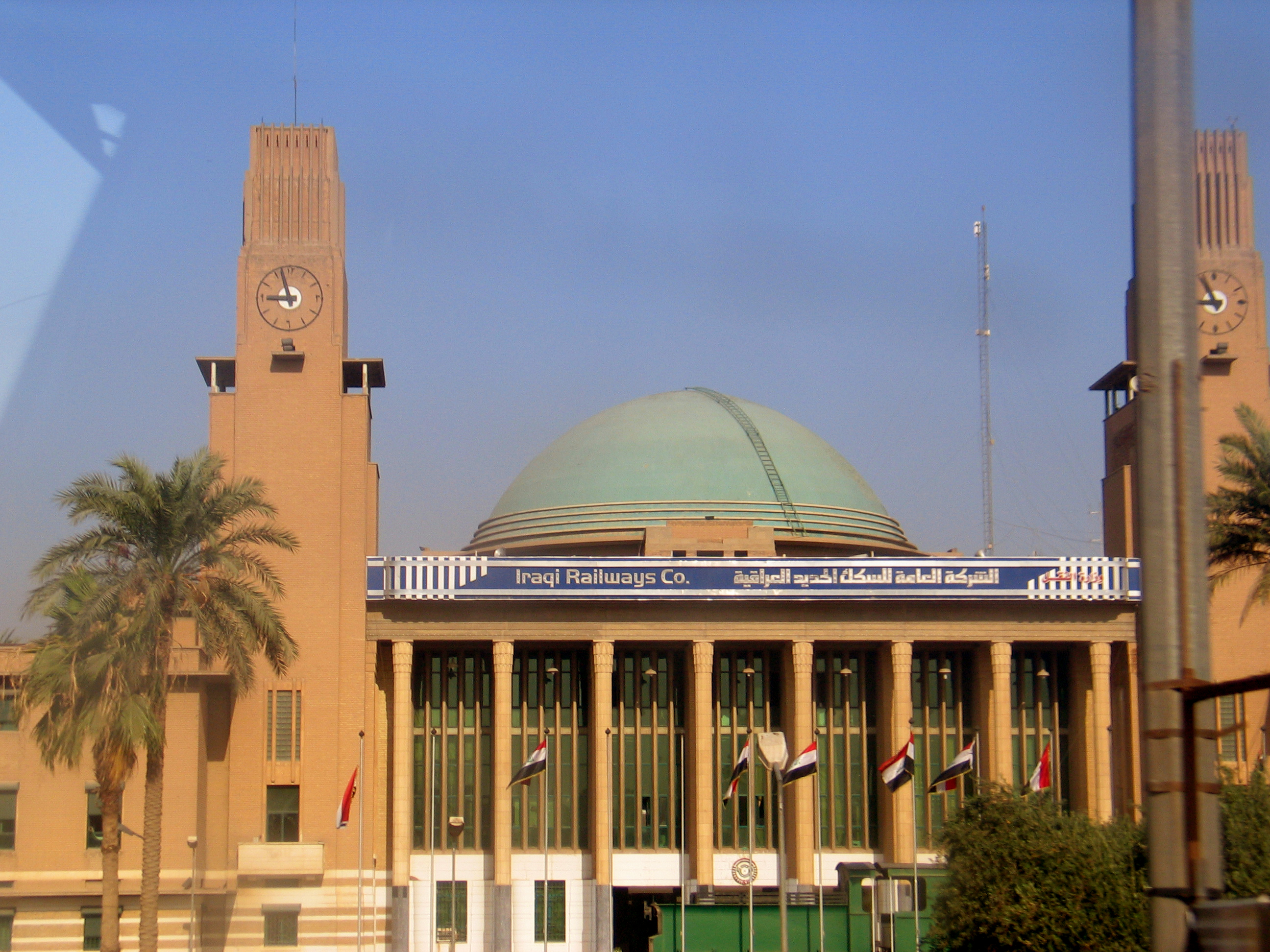
Baghdad Central Station in 2017.

Rail transport in Iraq is owned and operated by the state-owned Iraqi Republic Railways.

The network comprises 2,272 kilometres (1,412 mi) of 4 ft 8 1/2 in (1,435 mm) standard gauge. It has one international interchange, with Syrian Railways at Rabiya. The system runs from Rabiya southward through Mosul, Baiji, and Baghdad to Basra, with a branch line from Shouaiba Junction (near Basra) to the ports of Khor Az Zubair and Umm Qasr, westward from Baghdad through Ramadi and Haqlaniya to Al-Qa'im and Husayba, with a branch line from Al-Qa'im to Akashat, and east–west from Haqlaniya through Bayji to Kirkuk.

== Network ==
=== Current routes ===
A diagram of the Iraqi Republic Railways

==== IRR Southern Line ====
The IRR Southern Line, also known as the Baghdad–Basra Railway Line, is the only fully operational rail route in Iraq. It stretches 550 kilometres to Basra Al Maqal railway station and has a branch line to Karbala and another one from Shoeyba Junction to Um Qasr.

==== IRR Northern Line ====
The IRR Northern Line connects the capital of Baghdad with the northern city of Mosul and then to the international interchange at Rabiyaa. The line is currently in reconstruction. A daily commuter train currently connects Baghdad and Samarra, with an extra train on Fridays for pilgrims.

==== IRR Western Line ====
The Line connects Baghdad to the phosphate mining village of Akashat. Between 2009 and 2024 the only section in use was the 65-kilometre-long section from Baghdad to Falluja. On October 8, 2024, the connection to the rest of the line finished reconstruction. On October 11, 2024, the first Train departed Ramadi for Baghdad after a fifteen-year hiatus.

==== IRR Transversal Line ====
This rail line connects Haditha with the intersection to the IRR Western, over Baiji, where it connects to the IRR Northern, to Kirkuk in the north-east of Iraq. It is the only major route to not run to Baghdad. Currently, only the Baiji-Field-Branch is currently in use for freight service.

=== Abandoned routes ===
==== IRR Eastern Line ====
The IRR Eastern Line was the last metre-gauge railway in Iraq connecting Baghdad, Baquba and Kirkuk with Erbil. It closed from 1984 to 1988. It also featured a branch from Jalawla Junction to Khanaqin.

==== Other narrow-gauge railways ====
Multiple narrow-gauge railways were built in Iraq during the First World War and British Mandate times. They were mostly constructed for warfare and logistics with portable track due to resource constraints. Some temporary routes later became the foundation for other railways, like the IRR Eastern. Some war time routes include:

- Qurna–Amara – 762mm-gauge (70 mi (110 km))
- Basra–Nasiriya – metre-gauge (140 mi (230 km))
- Sheikh Saad–Sinn – 762mm-gauge (24 mi (39 km))
- Baghdad–Radhwaniya – 600mm-gauge
- Baghdad–Mufraz – 600mm-gauge
- Baghdad–Table Mountain – 762mm-gauge (65 mi (105 km))

== History ==
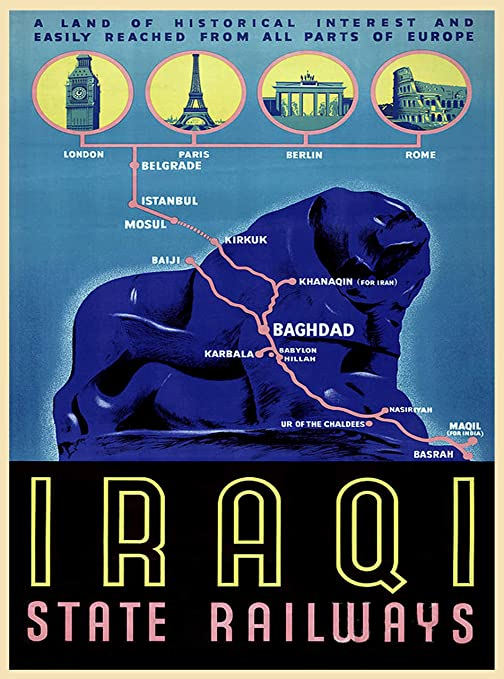
Advert from the 1930s

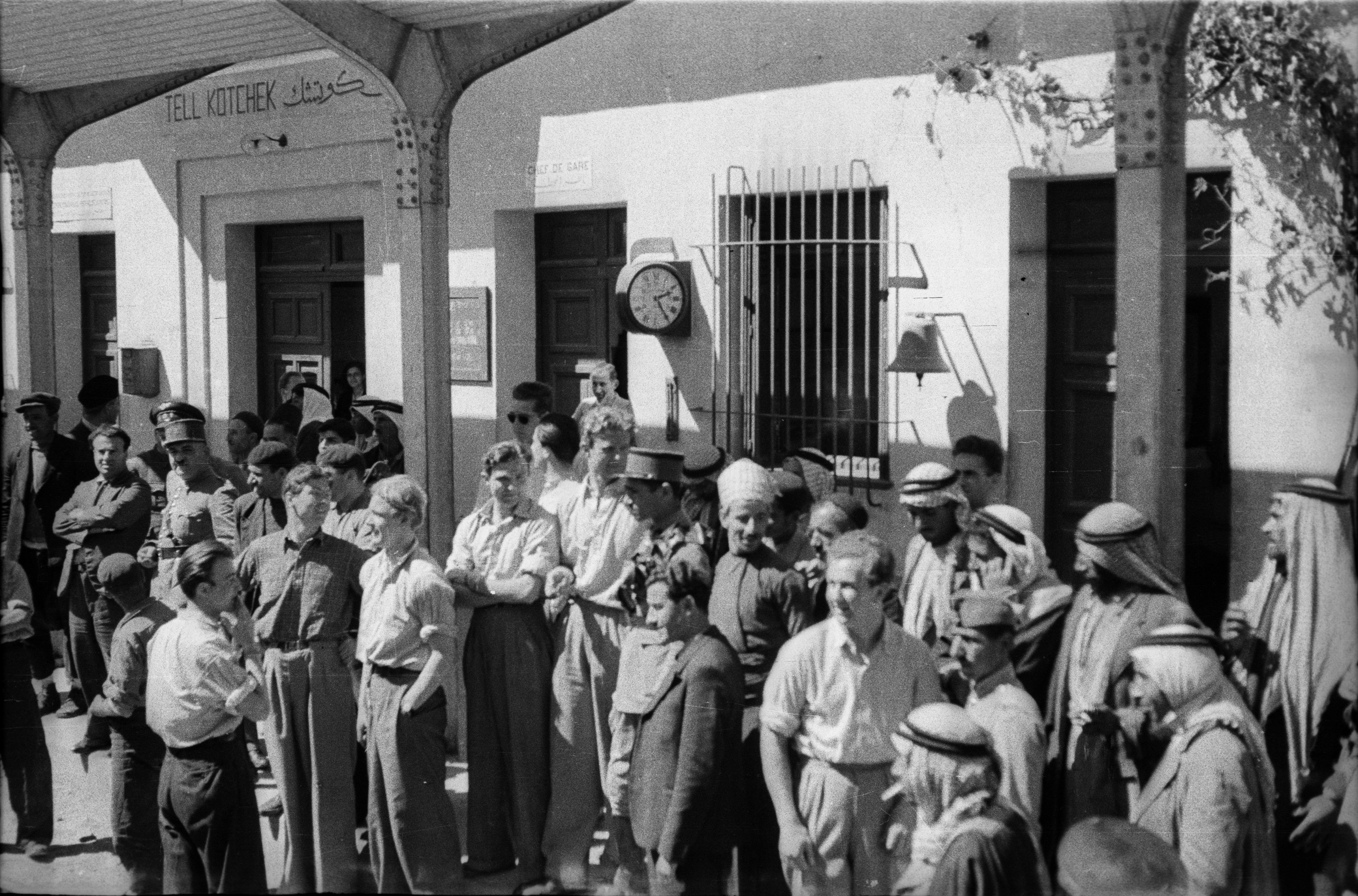
Germans, Norwegians, French-Syrian colonial officials and others at the train station in Tell Kotchek, 1940.

The first section of railway in what was then the Ottoman Empire province of Mesopotamia was a 123 kilometres (76 mi) length of the Baghdad Railway between that city & Samarra opened in 1914. Work had started northwards from Baghdad with the aim of meeting the section being constructed across Turkey and Syria to Tel Kotchek and an extension northwards from Samarra to Baiji was opened in December 1918.

From 1916 onwards an invading British Military force brought narrow gauge equipment, firstly 2 ft 6 in (762 mm) gauge and later 1,000 mm (3 ft 3 3/8 in) metre gauge gauge from India to Southern Mesopotamia to construct various sections of line to support its offensive against the Turks. Britain defeated the Ottomans and Mesopotamia became a League of Nations mandate under British administration. In April 1920 the British military authorities transferred all railways to a British civilian administration, Mesopotamian Railways.

The metre gauge line from Basra to Nasiriyah was the most important section constructed during the war in terms of its significance as part of later efforts to construct a national railway network. Soon after the end of World War I this was extended northwards from Ur Junction outside Nasiriyah up the Euphrates valley with the complete Basra to Baghdad route being opened on 16 January 1920.

The other section of metre gauge line built during World War I that had ongoing significance was that from Baghdad East north eastwards to the Persian border. After the war the eastern end of this line was diverted to Khanaqin and the wartime built line north west from Jalula Junction was extended from Kingerban to Kirkuk in 1925.

In 1932 Iraq became independent from the UK. In March 1936 the UK sold Mesopotamian Railways to Iraq, which renamed the company Iraqi State Railways. Work resumed on the extension of the Baghdad Railway between Tel Kotchek on the Syrian frontier and Baiji. The through route was opened and completed on 15 July 1940. In 1941 the Iraqi State Railways PC class 4-6-2 steam locomotives were introduced to haul the Baghdad–Istanbul Taurus Express on the Baghdad Railway between Baghdad and Tel Kotchek. From 1941 onwards the UK War Department supplemented ISR's locomotive fleets: the metre gauge with HG class 4-6-0s requisitioned from India and new USATC S118 Class 2-8-2s from the US, and the standard gauge with new LMS Stanier Class 8F 2-8-0s and USATC S100 Class 0-6-0Ts.

Principal railway routes in Iraq

In 1947 the Iraq Petroleum Company opened a branch at Kirkuk, which it operated with its own Hudswell Clarke 2-8-4Ts from 1951. ISR opened a new metre gauge line from Kirkuk to Arbil in 1949. A joint road and rail bridge was opened across the River Tigris in Baghdad in 1950, finally connecting the east and west bank metre gauge systems. ISR added new steam locomotives in the 1950s: 20 metre gauge 2-8-2s from Ferrostaal of Essen and 10 from Vulcan Foundry in 1953 and 20 more from Maschinenfabrik Esslingen in 1955–56 and 2-8-0s from Krupp, plus standard gauge 2-8-0s also from Krupp.

In 1958 when Iraq's Hashemite monarchy was overthrown and a republic declared, ISR was renamed Iraqi Republic Railways. In 1961 IRR began to replace its standard gauge steam locomotive fleet with diesels from ČKD and Alco. In 1972 several classes of steam locomotive were still in service on the standard gauge system, but these were replaced by further classes of diesel from Alstom, Montreal Locomotive Works and MACOSA. IRR did not begin to replace its metre gauge steam locomotives until after 1983.

In 1964 IRR extended its standard gauge network with a line from Baghdad to Basrah which opened for freight in 1964 and for passengers in 1968. It has since been extended from Shouaiba Junction to the port of Umm Qasr.

From 1980 until 2003 the network suffered approximately one billion United States dollars' worth of war and looting damage.

== Rolling stock ==
In 1936, the Iraqi State Railways owned 114 locomotives, 8 railcars, 320 coaches and 3,485 goods wagons.

=== Current (information partly from 2004) ===
Class	Image	Axle formula	Number	Year in service	Power [hp]	Constructor	Notes
DEM 2701–2750		Bo-Bo	50	2001	2,000	Dalian	In service
DHS 101–103BB		Bo-Bo	3	1986	600	Nippon Sharyo	Not in service anymore
DHS 111–113BB		Bo-Bo	3	1973	600	Nippon Sharyo	Not in service anymore
DHS 121–127BB		Bo-Bo	7	1982	600	Nippon Sharyo	Not in service anymore
DHS 131–144		Bo-Bo	14	2002–2003	1,000	Tülomsas	8 in service in 2004
DHS 151–162		Bo-Bo	12	2004–2005	1,200	Tülomsas	
DEM 2001–2010		Co-Co	10	1963	1,650	ČKD	5657–5766. Not in service anymore
DEM 2011–2020		Co-Co	10	1964	1,650	ČKD	5802–5811. Not in service anymore
DEM 2101–2105		Co-Co	5	1965	2,000	Alco	3416.01–3416.05. Not in service anymore
DEM 2201–2220		Co-Co	20	1971	2,000	Alstom	Not in service anymore
DEM 2301–2330		Co-Co	30	1975	2,000	Montreal Locomotive Works	6083.01–6083.30. Not in service anymore
DEM 2331–2361		Co-Co	30	1976	2,000	Montreal Locomotive Works	6093.01–6093.31. Not in service anymore
		DMU	10	2014	3,600	CSR	160 km/h. 10-car long-distance train has two power cars and accommodates up to 343 passengers intended for Baghdad–Basra on the Bagdad–Basra train.
DEM 2401–2455		Co-Co	55	1980	2,000	Macosa	1631–1685. Some possibly still in service
DEM 2501–2582		Co-Co	82	1983	2,250	Henschel & Son	32711–32720, 32639–32710. Seen in service in 2007. 2559–2561 were formerly dedicated to Saddam Hussein's private passenger train.
DEM 2801–2830		Co-Co	30	2004	2,630	Lugansk (LuganskTeplovoz)	Some possibly still in service
DES 3001–3036		Bo-Bo	36	1962–1973	650	ČKD	
DES 3101–3200		Co-Co	100	1979–1981	1,100	ČKD	11301–11303, 12204–12211, 12272–12360
DES 3301–3306		Bo-Bo	6	2004	1,200	Bryansk	
DEM 4001-11		Co-Co	11	1980	3,600	Francorail	
DEM 4101-61		Co-Co	6	1980–1982	3,600	Francorail	
* DHS = Diesel-hydraulic, DEM = Diesel-electric

=== Retired ===
Class	Image	Axle Formula	Number	Year in Service	Constructor	Notes
HJ Class		4-6-0	203	1902		Originally built for Bengal and North Western Railway. Exported to Iraq in Second World War.
HG Class		4-6-0		1907	Robert Stephenson & Company	One seen as 132 in 1967. Originally built for Burma Railways. Exported to Iraq later.
HG Class		4-6-0		1920	Nasmyth Wilson	One seen as 179 in 1967. Originally built for South Indian Railway Company. Exported to Iraq later.
HG Class		4-6-0		192	North British	One seen as 193 in 1967. Originally built for South Indian Railway Company. Exported to Iraq later.
HGS Class		4-6-0		1921	Vulcan Foundry	One seen as 149 in 1967. Exported to Iraq later.
NA Class		4-8-0	226	1920	North British	Originally built for Madras and Southern Mahratta Railway. Exported to Iraq in Second World War.
?		0-6-0	?	1912	Borsig	One photographed in 1967 on display at Baghdad West Railway station.
?		0-4-0VBT	?	1928	Sentinel	Two photographed in 1967 as RM2/RM3.
PC class		4-6-2	4	1941	Robert Stephenson & Hawthorns	Nos. 501–504. Built in 1940. 504 lost during transport to Iraq. Out of service in 1967.
TD Class		2-8-0	12	1942	North British	143 Sent to Iran after 1941 Anglo-Soviet invasion. Ten were purchased by I.R.R. in 1947, two in 1948. Operated until the seventies. 1 Currently possible disused – abandoned in field near IRR 33°20′43.20″N 44°21′13.90″E. Series around 1400. War Department 70746> 1402
SA Class		0-6-0	5	1942-'44	Davenport	Nos. 1211–1215. In 1967 at least two active. According to some they were used by Palestine Military Railway first. P.M.R. 106 > 423, 165 > 425, 404 > 429, 406 > 430, 434 > 431, 437 > 432, 512 > 438.
V Class		0-4-0T		1910	Borsig	One seen as 208 in 1967 on display in Shalchiyah.
W Class		2-8-2		1943	Alco	One seen as 63 in 1967.
		2-8-4T	3	1951	Hudswell Clarke	Nos. 1–3.
Y Class		2-8-2	10	1953	Vulcan Foundry	One seen as 80 in 1967
Z Class		2-8-2		1956	Esslingen	One seen as 96.

=== Couplings ===
IRR uses Soviet-style SA3 couplers. In order to allow interchange with Syrian Railways and Turkish State Railways which both use screw couplers, IRR locomotives and most wagons are equipped with screw couplers and buffers. In Iraqi service the buffers do not make contact and the screw couplings hang down unattached.

== Developments ==
=== Iraq–Jordan Direct Railway Link ===
In August 2011, the Jordanian government approved the construction of the railway from Aqaba to the Iraqi border (near Trebil). The Iraqis in the meantime started the construction of the line from the border to their current railhead at Ramadi.

=== High-speed Baghdad–Basra line ===
In 2011, a 650 km (400 mi) 250 km/h (155 mph) line between Baghdad and Basra was planned, with the Iraqi Railways and Alstom designing the route.

It started operations since 2014, and at that time not classified as a true high-speed rail. New trainsets for use on the Baghdad–Basra route were unveiled in China in February 2014 before being shipped to Iraq.

=== Iraq–Iran Basra–Shalamcheh line ===
In December 2021, Iran and Iraq agreed to build a railway connecting both countries. The project would connect Basra in southern Iraq to Shalamcheh in western Iran. There are only around 30 kilometers (18 miles) between the two areas. The railway would be strategically important for Iran, linking the country to the Mediterranean Sea via Iraq and Syria's railways.

== Rail links to adjacent countries ==
- Iran – one link partially under construction and a second link planned
  - Khorramshahr, Iran, to Basra, Iraq – under construction (2023)
  - Kermanshah, Iran, and the Iraqi province of Diyala – construction commenced.
- Jordan – partially constructed – break of gauge 4 ft 8 1/2 in (1,435 mm) standard gauge/1,050 mm (3 ft 5 11/32 in) gauge
- Syria – same gauge – at Rabia/al-Yaarubiyah

== See also ==
- Iraqi Republic Railways
- Arab Mashreq International Railway
- List of railway stations in Iraq
- Transport in Iraq
- Iraq–Europe Development Road
