= Military railways in Iraq =

Abandoned railways in Iraq

The Iraqi military railways operated in the British-occupied parts of the Ottoman Empire, the British Mandate for Mesopotamia and modern Iraq. The approximately 1,610 km (1,000 mi) of tracks were built during and after the First World War and were laid using portable track in today's Iraq. They comprised 1,290 km (800 mi) of primary railways and 320 km (200 mi) of secondary railways. Most wartime lines were either upgraded to metre- or standard-gauge or abandoned if not. Purposes of the lines were to supply troops, provide communications, relieve river traffic, expedite connections and limited civilian traffic, especially after 1919. By the 1960s, the last remnants of the railways were abandoned with the retrofitting of the IRR Southern Line from metre- to standard-gauge. About 20,000 Indian convicted labourers worked on the railways, with additional labour drawn from Turkish POWs.

== Objectives ==
A reason for the continuous interest of Britain in Mesopotamia was the idea of using the area as a shortcut to India with multiple plans being made for railways linking the Mediterranean with the Persian Gulf as early as 1857 following the Sepoy Mutiny.

These railways were constructed to connect recently conquered Baghdad with Basra for the supply of northwards advancing troops. Also, they accelerated the travel times in Iraq. For example, the time to travel from Kut to Baghdad was cut from 2 days to 8 hours. Even though river transport still constituted the main transport artery during the war, the importance of railways grew immensely in Iraq, with 2.7 million tons of cargo being transported on the network during 1917 and 1918.

The British, who already by the start of the war assumed they would retain Basra, if not the entire territory, had already made plans by the beginning of the war for a "'proposed city of the future'" as the Architects' Journal portrayed Captain Samuel Douglas Meadows's ideas for Basra and the development of its railways and ports.

== The first railways ==
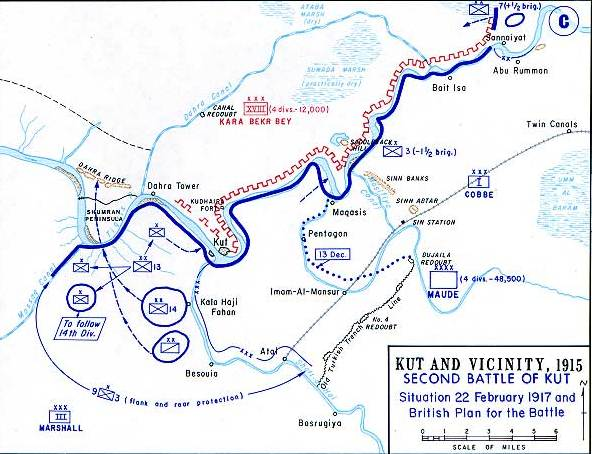
A map of the eastern end of the Sheikh Saad-Sinn line with the Twin Canals, Sinn, Imam-Al-Mansur and Atal Stations on the map.

The history of railways in Iraq started, aside from some horse-driven tramways, in 1914 with the Berlin-Baghdad Railway. Yet only following the British landing at Fao, railways first became an essential part of Iraqi transport and infrastructure.

=== Light railway Qurna-Amara ===
The 762mm-gauge Railway Qurna-Amara ran 112 km (70 mi) from Qurna to Amara in the south-east of Iraq along the Tigris. It was one of the first two railways in Iraq, built in 1916 and opened to traffic in November of the same year. It ran along the right bank of the Tigris and its principal objective was to relieve the river traffic on the difficult section of the Tigris between Qurna and Amara. Nearly the whole railway passed through flood-prone areas and the track had to be built on a high embankment. Many bridges were also necessary, for example, the one crossing the Majar Kebir Spillway with a length of 60 m (200 ft).

=== Light railway Basra-Nasiriya ===
The metre-gauge Railway Basra-Nasiriya was the first metre-gauge railway to be opened in Mesopotamia and was the most vital connection for the British war effort in Mesopotamia. It connected the port city of Basra with the city of Nasiriya. It followed the Euphrates with a length of 225 km (140 mi). The rails were laid on mostly Indian broad-gauge sleepers so that the line could be converted to a standard-gauge track by shifting one rail. Large sections of the line passed below sea level and many banks had to be constructed.

=== Light railway Sheikh Saad-Sinn ===
The 762mm-gauge Railway Sheikh Saad-Sinn(-Atab) was a local military supply line, which opened in October 1916. It ran 38 km (24 mi) between Sheikh Saad and Sinn and in total 56 km (35 mi). It was built for communication between the British-Indian Tigris Corps on the Kut Front and the Tigris Base further south. It later formed the middle section of the Amara-Kut line. By May 1917 the line was dismantled to provide tracks for the Baghdad-Diyala Railway.

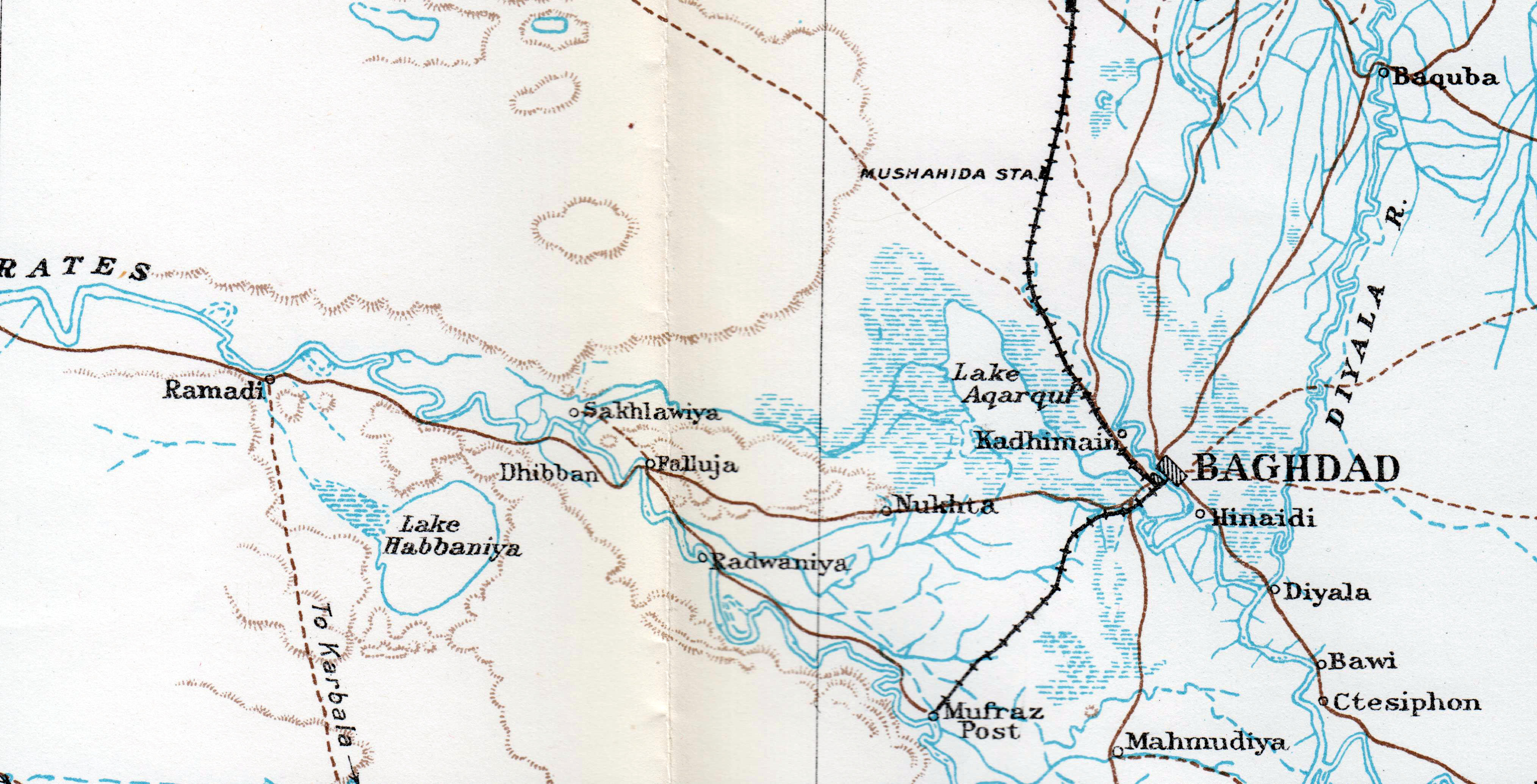
Baghdad-Mufraz and Baghdad-Samarra Railways.

=== Decauville railways ===
==== Decauville railway Baghdad-Ridhwaniya ====
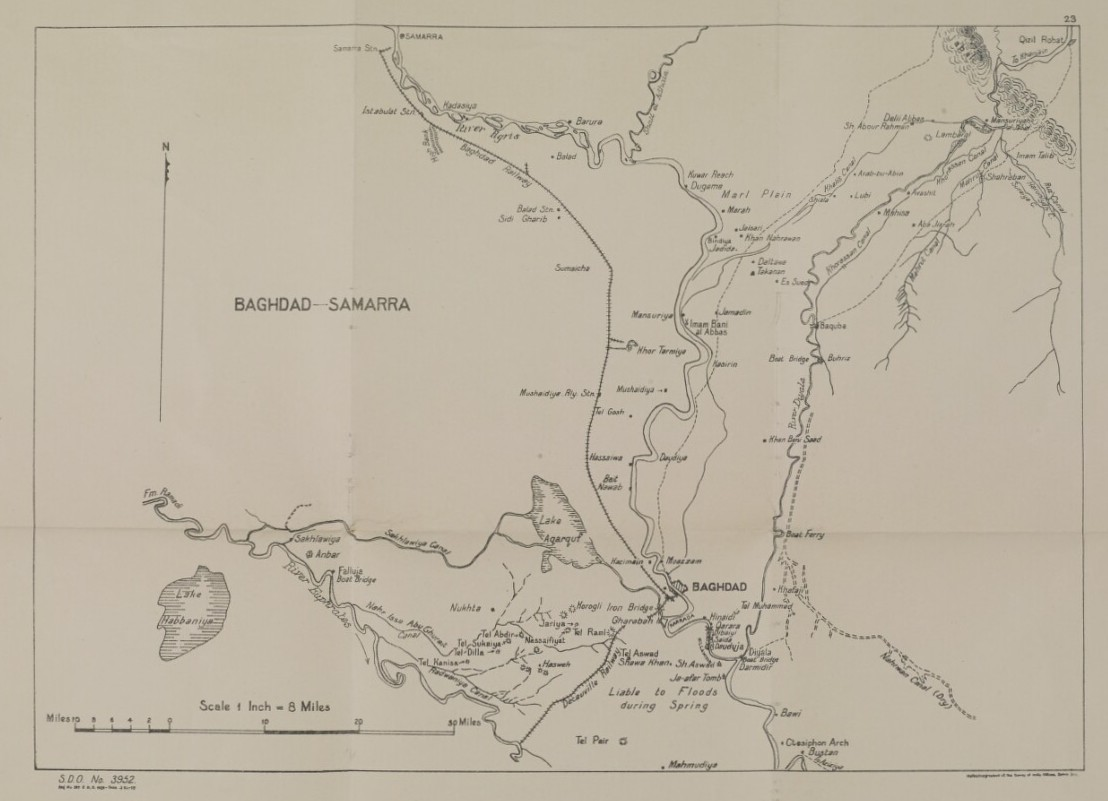
Decauville Railways running south-west of Baghdad

The hand-operated 600mm-gauge railway line from Ridhwaniya to Baghdad connected the Euphrates with Baghdad. It ran south of the old caravan route from Aleppo via Falluja to Baghdad. It began near the mouth of the Ridhwaniya Canal and led to Baghdad via Abu Thubba, Tel Aswad and the Baghdad suburb of Kharr. In May 1916, the wagons were still pushed by hand.

On the night of April 24th to 25th, 1917, a dam that had held back the Euphrates floods broke, whereupon the road to Falluja and the Decauville railway from Ridhwaniya to Baghdad were flooded and became impassable. In the area where the dam broke, the floodwater was 4.5 m (15 ft) m deep and flowed through the narrow passage at high speeds, making it difficult to repair the dam. To bring sandbags to the dam break, a temporary route made of Decauville yokes and climbing switches was quickly laid there, along which trains with up to 6 tipping wagons loaded with sandbags could be pushed by hand. After the work was completed, the floodwater dropped to below 1 m (3.3 ft).

==== Decauville railway Baghdad-Mufraz ====
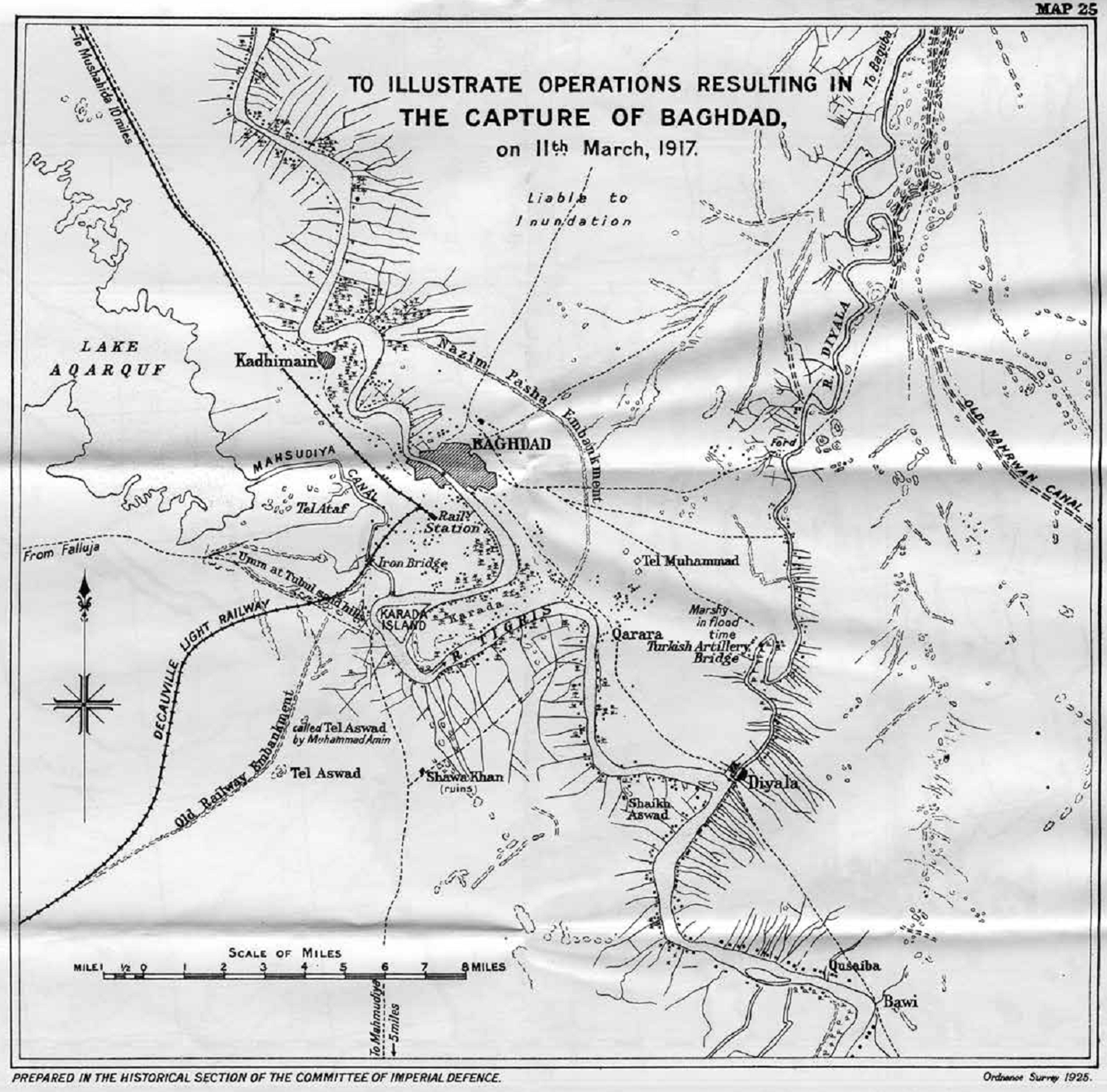
The old and new route of the Decauville Railway Baghdad–Mufraz, March 1917

The Decauville Railway Baghdad–Mufraz ran from Baghdad in a southwesterly direction to Mufraz. On March 11, 1917, British forces occupied Baghdad. Shortly afterwards, Turkish troops who had fled north destroyed the Sakhlawiya Dam on the Euphrates, flooding an area south of Baghdad through which the first 17.7 kilometres (11.0 mi) of the light railway ran. From March 30, 1917, to April 13, 1917, British soldiers dismantled the line laid with portable tracks and laid it on a new route by April 25, 1917. During the day, the sun's rays made the rails so hot that the soldiers could only touch them if they protected their hands with empty sandbags. Since no expansion joints were available, the tracks experienced a lot of buckling in some sections due to the extreme heat and had to be re-laid in the second half of April 1917.

== Creating the connection from Basra to Baghdad ==
=== Over the Tigris ===
Following these three initial routes, further lines were built to connect Baghdad and Basra, leading to two routes between the two cities, one along the right bank of the Euphrates and the other along the right bank of the Tigris. The Basra-Qurna(64 km (40 mi)) line was constructed between February 1917 and December 16, 1917. The main difficulty was crossing the 21 m (69 ft) deep Garmat Ali Canal, which was too deep for an ordinary pile bridge and required a pontoon bridge brought from India. This was no permanent solution because trains could only cross it 16 hours a day, due to the strong tides experienced near Basra. Another major infrastructural feat was the 275 m (900 ft) pile bridge over the Euphrates before Qurna Station.

The sections Amara-Sheikh Saad(138 km (86 mi)), Sinn-Kut and Kut-Baghdad(175 km (109 mi)) then finished the Tigris route from Basra to Baghdad. Along the Kut-Baghdad section 13 railway stations were built. The main terminal for trains along the line was at Hinaidi, even though the line was already extended to Baghdad East where it interchanged with the Baghdad-Diyala Railway.

Later, a metre-gauge connection was built from Basra to Amara over Qurna. That line was operational from 1917 to the early 1920s.

=== Over the Euphrates ===
The 93 km (58 mi) Hilla-Baghdad railway was opened for traffic in May 1918 on 75lbs rails on top of broad gauge sleepers. The original plan was to have Baghdad connected to Mussayib with a standard-gauge line branching 5 km (3 mi) after Baghdad at the Baghdad-Dhibban railway. This was abandoned due to strategic changes by the war command.

The Nasiriya-Hilla railway started construction in August 1918. This through-connection from Basra to Baghdad along the Euphrates wasn't as vital and quickly built as the one along the Tigris, as the distance was greater between the two terminals. It was still constructed to connect the larger population centres along the Euphrates to Baghdad and Basra. Due to material shortages, the opening was postponed until after the end of the war in 1920.

A 34 km (21 mi) 762mm-gauge branch line was built from Hilla to Kifl to transport harvest from the Hindiya agricultural district to Baghdad. The branch line operated from 1918 to the early 1920s.

The Basra City Terminal, at the edge of Old Basra(Basra Al Qadima) was still active to at least the 1940s, but was eventually deconstructed, moving the terminal to Maqil. Maqil Station also operated tourism-centered trains on a 610mm-gauge tourist railway operated by Sunbeam Tours, who organised tours for British tourists to India and Mesopotamia.

== Other military railways ==
=== Standard-gauge railway Baghdad-Dhibban ===
In August 1917 a standard-gauge line started construction from Baghdad to Falluja and was only finished by December of the same year due to material shortages. Later, after the occupation of Ramadi, the line increased in priority. A plan to extend the line to Ramadi was made, but it was only extended to Dhibban (today:Habbaniya) 78 km (48 mi) from Baghdad. The construction work was finished by February 1918. The line was closed by the early 1920s.

=== Standard-gauge railway Tanuma-Akela ===
A 22 km (14 mi) long railway connected Tanuma, a town across the Shatt Al Arab from Basra to Akela near Khorramshahr in Iran.

=== Light railway Baghdad-Diyala ===
In May 1917, construction began on a light railway line from Baghdad to the Diyala Front. Due to a lack of metre-gauge material, it was built with a track width of 762 mm using material from the dismantled Sheikh Saad-Sinn and Qurna-Amara lines. The route was opened to traffic on July 13, 1917. It was soon thereafter extended to Table Mountain, 105 km (65 mi) from Baghdad. Later, a new metre-gauge line was laid alongside the existing narrow-gauge line, that was later extended to Quretu in Iran.

=== Light railway Baquba-Kut ===
For a brief while, there was a 200 km (120 mi) connection from Jasimiya near Baquba to Kut, bypassing Baghdad. It was still operational as late as the 1940s.

== See also ==
British military narrow-gauge railways
