= List of bridges in Iraq =

This list of bridges in Iraq lists bridges of particular historical, scenic, architectural or engineering interest. Road and railway bridges, viaducts, aqueducts and footbridges are included.

== Historical and architectural interest bridges ==
	Name	Arabic	Distinction	Length	Type	Carries Crosses	Opened	Location	Governorate	Ref.
1	Delal Bridge	پل دلال	Height : 15.5 m (51 ft); Span : 16 m (52 ft)	115 m (377 ft)	Masonry; 5 arches, carved limestone	Khabur (Tigris)		Zakho; 37°08′10.6″N 42°41′41.6″E	Duhok Governorate	
2	Abbasid Bridge	القنطرة العباسية		22 m (72 ft)	Masonry; 1 remaining arch	Wadi al Murr		Nineveh; 36°31′48.1″N 42°43′17.8″E	Nineveh Governorate	

== Major road and railway bridges ==
This table presents the structures with spans greater than 100 meters (non-exhaustive list).

	Name	Arabic	Span	Length	Type	Carries Crosses	Opened	Location	Governorate	Ref.
1	Adhamiyah Bridge	جسر الأئمة	182 m (597 ft)	370 m (1,210 ft)	Cable-stayed; Composite steel/concrete deck, 1 steel pylon 182+60+61	Road bridge Tigris	1983	Baghdad; 33°21′33.7″N 44°21′14.9″E	Baghdad Governorate	(Note: The length given only takes into account the main bridge, central span(s) and shore span(s), approach viaducts are not counted.)
2	14th of July Bridge	جسر 14 تموز	168 m (551 ft)	335 m (1,099 ft)	Suspension; Self-anchored, steel girder deck, steel pylons 84+168+84	Road bridge Tigris	1964	Baghdad; 33°17′45.0″N 44°23′59.7″E	Baghdad Governorate	
3	Muhammad al-Baqir al-Sadr Bridge	جسر التنومة الجديد	150 m (490 ft)	1,188 m (3,898 ft)	Cable-stayed; Steel box girder deck, steel pylons 69+150+69	Road bridge Shatt al-Arab	2017	Basra; 30°30′38.7″N 47°51′07.0″E	Basra Governorate	
4	Bridge of Civilizations	جسر الحضارات			Cable-stayed	Road bridge Euphrates	2015	Nasiriyah; 31°02′30.3″N 46°15′04.1″E	Dhi Qar Governorate	

== Notes and references ==
- Notes
- Others references

== See also ==
- Transport in Iraq
- Roads in Iraq
- Rail transport in Iraq
- Geography of Iraq
- List of Roman bridges
