= Dhia (disambiguation) =

Dhia is a village in Punjab, India

Dhia may also refer to:

- Dhia Jafar, Iraqi engineer and statesman
- Dhia Habib, Iraqi support coach
- Abdelaziz Ben Dhia, was adviser to Tunisian President
- Jafar Dhia Jafar, an Iraqi nuclear physicist
