= Baghdad Central =

Baghdad Central may refer to:

- Baghdad Central, a 2014 novel by Elliott Colla
- Baghdad Central (TV series), based on the novel
- Baghdad Central Prison, formerly Abu Ghraib prison
- Baghdad Central Station, the main train station in the Iraqi capital
