= IRR Eastern Line =

Abandoned Railway Line in Iraq

The IRR Eastern Line, alternatively the Baghdad-Erbil Railway was a metre-gauge railway connecting Baghdad and Erbil via Baqubah and Kirkuk in Iraq. It was part of the Iraqi Republic Railways network. It ran roughly 60 km east parallel to the Baghdad Railway, but it ran on the left bank of the Tigris. It was the last railway of its kind in Iraq.

== Jalawla-Khanaqin Branch ==
A 27 km (17 mi) branch from Jalawla Junction to Khanaqin was extended from Kingerban, replacing the old wartime line to Quraitu in today's Iran. Shortly after the start of World War 1, Russia repudiated its obligation to build the Khanaqin-Tehran Line as a part of the Trans-Iranian Railway.

== History ==
=== Origin ===
Constructing a railway line from Baghdad to Kirkuk was discussed in the latter half of the 19th century. However, the project was delayed due to the disruptions caused by World War I.

=== Light railway Baghdad-Diyala ===
In May 1917, construction began on a light railway line from Baghdad to the Diyala Front. Due to a lack of metre-gauge material, it was built with a track width of 762 mm from material from the dismantled Sheikh Saad-Sinn line and the abandoned Qurna-Amara line. The route was opened to traffic on July 13, 1917 to Baquba. It was later extended to Table Mountain, 105 km (65 mi) from Baghdad. Between Baquba and Table Mountain, a 6.5 km long branch line opened in 1917, connecting Abu Jezra and Abu Saida on the Diyala River, one of the main tributaries of the Tigris.

=== Metre-gauge railway Baghdad-Quretu ===
Later, a new meter gauge line was laid alongside the existing narrow-gauge line. The Baghdad–Baquba section was opened in November 1917, and the Baquba–Table Mountain section in June 1918. The line initially ran on a wooden bridge over the Diyala River at Baquba. At the end of 1918, the pile bridge was replaced by a permanent structure consisting of four 30 m spans and two 23 m spans on caisson piers. Towards the end of 1918, an extension of this line to Khanaqin on the Persian border was completed.

After the British received the Mandate for Mesopotamia in 1918, the Baghdad-Quraitu Railway commenced construction to Quretu in modern day Iran, 210 km (130 mi) from Baghdad. Work on the Kirkuk Railway Station beginning six years later in 1925. The foundations for the Kirkuk-Baghdad-Haifa Railway were laid starting in 1930. The section connecting Baghdad to Haifa was eventually abandoned because of the outbreak of the Arab-Israeli War. Still, the Mesopotamian Railways continued constructing the railway line towards Kirkuk, from Quraitu onwards. In 1947, a 12 km connection to the Baba Gurgur oil refinery was built from Kirkuk.

In 1949, the railway was extended by 105 kilometers to Erbil, with a new railway bridge crossing the Great Zab River near Al-Tun. By 1950, the first train arrived in Erbil. In 1963, a plan to extend the railway further to Sulaymaniyah was proposed by Major General Saleh Zaki Tawfiq, the Iraqi director of railways. However, this plan was abandoned after the regime change in 1968.

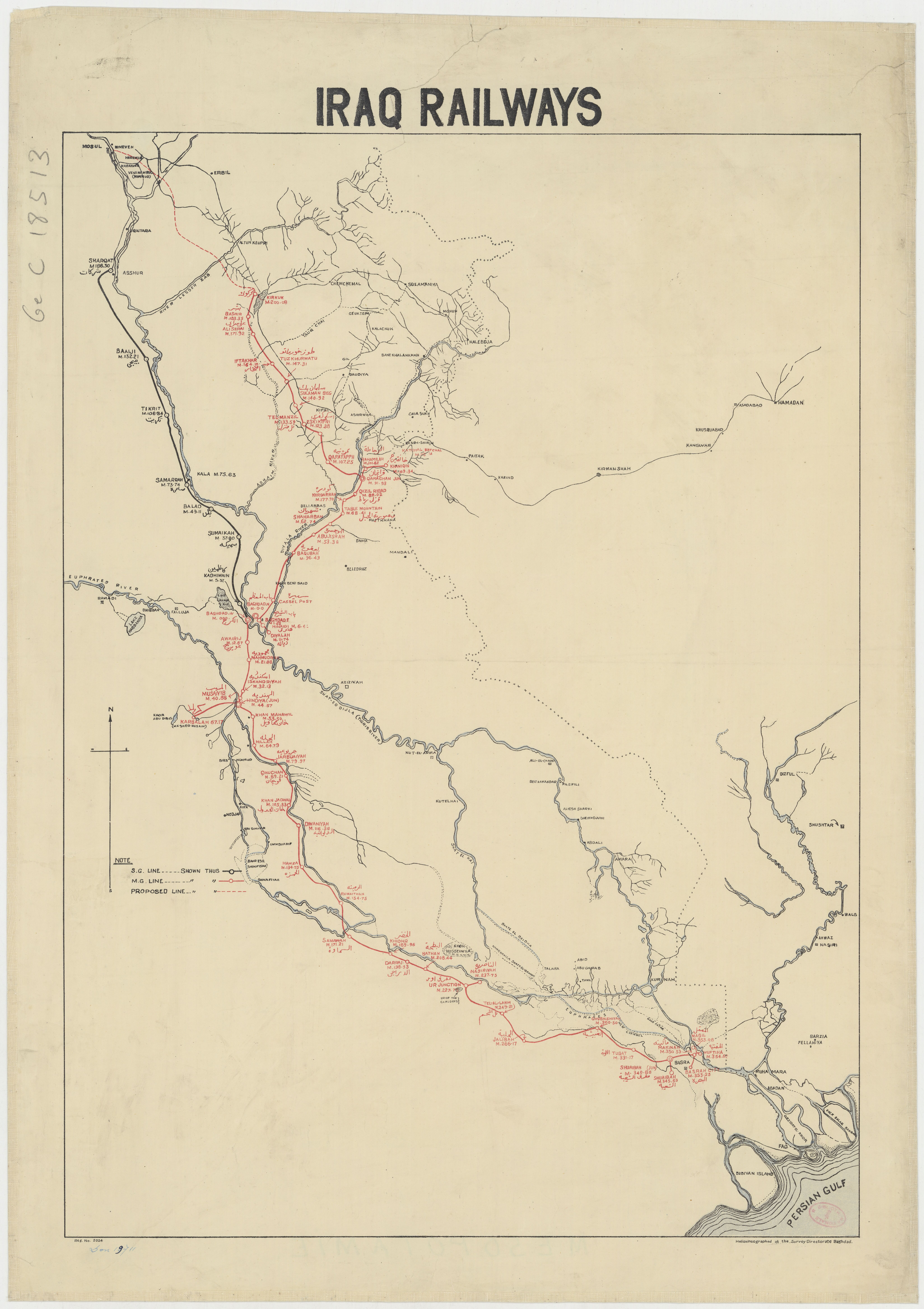
The IRR Eastern Line in the Northwest of the map, with a false "Proposed Line" from Kirkuk to Mosul instead of Erbil.

==== Opening dates ====
Section	Opening Date
Jaloula Junction–Eskikifri–Kingirban	September 1919
Eskikifri–Tuz Khurmatu	April 1925
Tuz Khurmatu–Kirkuk	August 1925
Kirkuk–Baba Gurgur	January 1947
Kirkuk–Erbil	June 1949

=== Decommissioning ===
After 1968, the Ba'ath regime put a similar plan to Saleh Zaki Tawfiq's forward to replace the existing railway with a new standard-gauge railway for interoperability with the IRR Northern, as well as the recently to standard-gauge retrofitted IRR Southern Line. This plan included the idea of extending the line to Sulaymaniyah. However, after further planning and evaluation, it was decided to build a new standard-gauge railway, creating a faster connection to Baghdad from Kirkuk. The new railway made the old connection economically obsolete, thus forcing it to close. Other, political reasons were to make Arabisation easier, by not only connecting Kirkuk better to other Sunni Arab areas in the west of Iraq but also cutting off railway access to Kurdish areas following the autonomy of Iraqi Kurdistan in 1970. Erbil and the rest of the Kurdistan Region slowly lost their rail service starting in 1984 by order of the Office of the Presidency of the Iraqi Republic and finishing on May 15, 1988.

As a result, many landmarks along the old line, such as the Erbil Railway Terminal, the Baba Kiwan Junction, multiple bridges, and various facilities such as hotels and hospitals, were demolished.

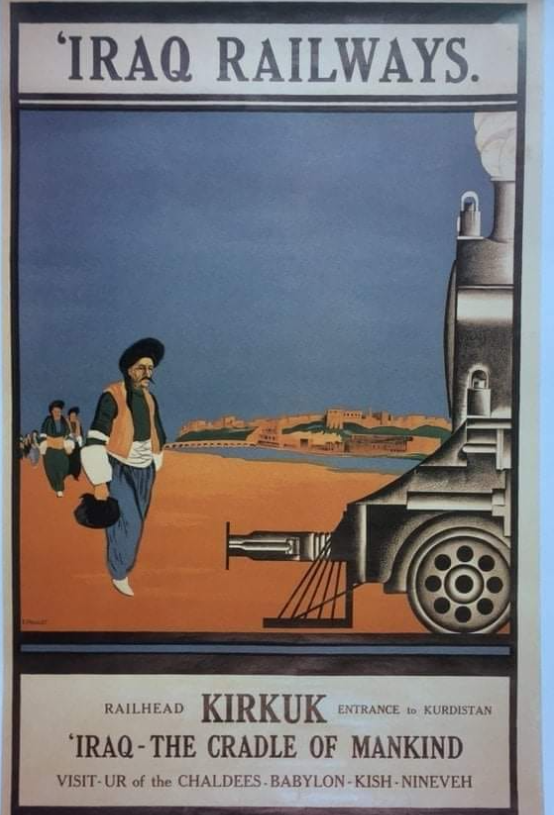
A poster from the days of the metre-gauge railway.
