= Abdul Saleh al-Killidar =

Custodian of Imam Husayn shrine

Sayyid Abdul Saleh al-Killidar
- السيد عبد الصالح الكليدار

38th Custodian of the Imam Husayn Shrine
- In office May 18, 1931 – June 7, 1981
- Preceded by: Abdul Husayn al-Killidar
- Succeeded by: Adel al-Killidar

Personal details
- Born: Abd al-Saleh Abd al-Husayn Ali Tumah; 1911 Karbala, Ottoman Empire
- Died: October 30, 2005 (aged 93–94) London, England
- Resting place: Karbala
- Relatives: Dhia Jafar (first cousin)

Sayyid Abd al-Saleh Abd al-Husayn al-Killdar Tumah (Arabic: عبد الصالح عبد الحسين الكليدار آل طعمه; 1911–October 30, 2005) was an Iraqi nobleman that served as the 38th custodian of the Imam Husayn shrine from 1931 until 1981.

== Biography ==
al-Killidar was born in 1911 to Abdul Husayn al-Killidar. He is from the Tumah branch of the Al Faiz family. His grandfather Jawad took on the name al-Killidar (Arabic: الكليدار) which roots from kileet (Persian: كليت) dar (Persian: دار), which translates to key holder in Persian, a name often given to those that take on the role of tending to holy shrines. His mother is the daughter of renowned merchant, Abd al-Hadi al-Astarabadi. His maternal uncle, Mahmoud al-Astarabadi, was a member of the senate in the royal era for the city of Kadhimiya.

He grew up and completed his high school studies in Karbala, and in 1928, his father passed down the sidana as he was going to become a member of the Iraqi senate in Baghdad. He took responsibility of the sidana in 1928, was officially assigned in 1931.

al-Killidar helped rebuild his fathers library, after it was burnt in the Hamza Bey incident of 1915.

In 1966, al-Killidar renewed the clock of the shrine, that was gifted by Naser al-Din Shah in 1891. al-Killidar imported the clock from Germany, and it remained in the shrine until the 1991 uprising, where it was destroyed during one of the Baathist helicopter gunship attacks.

al-Killidar retired on June 7, 1981, after serving for just under 50 years, and passed down the custodianship to his son, Adel.

== Personal life ==
al-Killidar was married to his second cousin, Iftikhar al-Astarabadi. She was the daughter of Khalil al-Astarabadi (1877–1970), the last mayor of Karbala under the Hashemite monarchy. He had three sons, Ali (d. 2018; dean of engineering at University of Baghdad), Adel (who became the saden after him) and Abdelilah and two daughters Afaf and Awatif. al-Killidar was fluent in English and Persian.

== Death ==
al-Killidar died on Sunday October 30, 2005, in his home in London. His body was transferred to Karbala to be buried.

== See also ==
- Imam Husayn shrine
- Al Faiz family
