= List of railway stations in Iraq =

Railway stations in Iraq include:

== Towns served ==
=== Existing ===
- Baghdad Central Station
- Al Maqal Railway Station in Basra

- Tikrit Railway Station in Saladin Governorate
- Bayji
- Al Hadithah – junction
- Al Qaim
- Akashat – railhead in west

=== Under construction ===
- Khanaqin-Khosravi, (Under construction)

=== Proposed ===
- Arbil – NE –
- Baghdad – C –
- Umm Qasr – S –

== Maps ==
- UNHCR Atlas Map
- UN Map
- Official website
- On Track on line – web log showing some recent photos
- Andrew's Locomotive and Rolling Stock in Iraq Page—excellent website with comprehensive roster of IRR locomotives; occasionally updated with news from Iraq.
- Iraq Railway Network Detailed map of railway routes in Iraq by the United Nations Joint Logistics Centre
- Rainer's Pages are dedicated to the old Railway Postal System of Iraq. It also shows old Iraq Railway Maps, Postal Cards and Photos.

== See also ==
- Transport in Iraq
- Railway stations in Jordan
