= Abdul Husayn al-Killidar =

Custodian of Imam Husayn shrine

Sayyid Abdul Husayn al-Killidar
- السيد عبد الحسين الكليدار

33rd Custodian of the Imam Husayn Shrine
- In office 1900–1916
- Preceded by: Ali al-Killidar
- Succeeded by: Abdul Husayn A'yan

37th Custodian of the Imam Husayn Shrine
- In office 1920 – May 18, 1931
- Preceded by: Abdul Husayn A'yan
- Succeeded by: Abdul Saleh al-Killidar

Personal details
- Born: Abd al-Husayn Ali Jawad Tumah; 1881 Karbala, Iraq
- Died: March 30, 1961 (aged 79–80) Karbala, Iraq
- Resting place: Imam Husayn Shrine

Sayyid Abd al-Husayn Ali al-Killdar Tumah (Arabic: عبد الحسين علي الكليدار آل طعمه; 1881–March 30, 1961) was an Iraqi nobleman, author, and scholar who served as the 33rd and 37th custodian of the Imam Husayn shrine from 1900 until 1931.

He authored a number of books on the history and culture of Karbala, including Baghiyat al-Nubala Fi Tarikh Karbala and Tarikh Al Tumah al-Musawiyeen. Famous Iraqi author and laureate, Salih Shahristani writes about al-Killidar: "I would never miss a meeting with him. I would gain so much from his knowledge, literary, and mannerism".

== Biography ==
al-Killidar was born in 1881 to Ali al-Killidar (d. May 3, 1900). He is from the Tumah branch of the Al Faiz family. His grandfather Jawad took on the name al-Killidar (Arabic: الكليدار) which roots from kileet (Persian: كليت) dar (Persian: دار), which translates to key holder in Persian, a name often given to those that take on the role of tending to holy shrines.

He grew up and studied in Karbala and was highly influenced by the literary atmosphere that surrounded him at the time. At the age of 19, after his father, Ali died, he took on the responsibilities of the custodianship of the Imam Husayn shrine.

Under his term as saden, he supervised the building of the golden iwan of the shrine in 1912. He also ordered the re-plating of the cage of the shrine, with silver, after it had worn out.

When Hamza Bey was appointed governor of Karbala on October 1, 1915, the relationship between the Ottoman state and the Karbalaeis had reached a bitter peak, and there was a sense of unrest in the city. This caused al-Killidar to leave Karbala for Baghdad in February 1916. Upon his departure, he was discharged from his duty as saden. This led to his first cousin, once removed, Abd al-Husayn Ayan to assume the role. It was until 1920, where al-Killidar was reinstated at the behest of Percy Cox, when he became High Commissioner of Iraq.

In 1928, Abd al-Husayn Ayan was nominated as a member of the Iraqi senate for a second term. However his appointment letter was mistakenly sent to al-Killidar, and the error was due to the shared first name and family. So al-Killidar decided to pass down the custodianship to his eldest son Abdul-Saleh and pursue the political role, unaware of the situation. Upon reaching Baghdad, the senate realised he was not the person intended, but due to the difficult situation, they decided to admit him as a member.

After his senate term, al-Killidar returned to Karbala and spent the rest of his days writing books and performing i'tikaf. Despite having passed down the sidana to his son in 1928, al-Killidar was officially discharged off his duties on May 18, 1931.

== Personal life ==
al-Killidar was married to the daughter of affluent Baghdadi merchant, Abd al-Hadi al-Astarabadi (1806–1899). He had two sons, Abd al-Saleh (who became the saden after him) and Muhammad-Kadhim.

al-Killidar's brother-in-law, Mahmoud al-Astarabadi, hid Nuri al-Said in his home, when he was wanted during the 14 July revolution. However, al-Said was compromised, and killed along with Astarabadi's wife, during their attempt to flee.

al-Killidar founded a grand library in Karbala, with many books, as well as his own publications and scripts. He had some remarkable manuscripts, including a poetry collection of Sheikh Muhammad-Ali Kamona, kashkool (diary) of Mawla Muhammad-Husayn al-Isfahani, Mafatih al-Maghaliq Fi Ilm al-I'dad wal-Huroof (book on science of letters) by Mahmud Dehdar, and an original copy of ْthe grand poet, Jawad Bedget's epic. The library was burnt down during the Hamza Bey incident of 1915. Despite this, al-Killidar rebuilt the library and passed it down to his son Adul-Saleh, and it stands until this day. The library was visited by notable figures such as Louis Massignon and Gertrude Bell, upon their travels to Iraq, in the early 20th century.

== Death ==
al-Killidar died on the night of Thursday March 30, 1961, and was buried in the south-east corner of the Husayn shrine courtyard, near the al-Raja door.

== Legacy ==
=== Books ===
- Baghiyat al-Nubala Fi Tarikh Karbala (The Purpose of the Nobles in the History of Karbala)
- Halat al-Arab al-Ijtima'iya Fi al-Jahiliya (The Arabs Social Status in Jahiliyyah)
- al-Zahr al-Muqtataff Fi Akhbar al-Taff
- Quraysh Fi al-Tarikh (Quraysh In History)
- Nash'at al-Dawla al-Aqiliyya (The Rise of the Aqilid State)
- Butoon Quraysh (The Core of Quraysh)
- Nash'at al-Adyan al-Samawiya (The Rise of the Religions of the Skies)
- Tarikh Al Tumah al-Musawiyeen (History of the Musawi Tumahs)
- Adyan al-Arab Fi al-Jahiliya (The Religions of the Arabs in Jahiliyyah)

=== Students ===
- Ahmed Hamed al-Sarraf - author of Umar al-Khayyam (Omar Khayyam) and al-Shabak (The Nets), as well as a previous governor of Karbala.
- Muhammad-Husayn al-Adib - principal of al-Husayn Primary School.
- Salman Hadi Tumah - notable author and writer.

== See also ==
- Imam Husayn shrine
- Al Faiz family
- Science of letters
