= Baghdad Metro =

Proposed railway system in Baghdad, Iraq

Overview
- Native name: مترو بغداد
- Locale: Baghdad, Iraq
- Transit type: Rapid transit
- Number of lines: 7 (planned)
- Number of stations: 64 (planned)
- Daily ridership: 3,250,000 (estimated)

Operation
- Operator: Ministry of Transport
- Character: Underground & Elevated

Technical
- System length: ~148 kilometres (92 mi)
- Track gauge: 1,435 mm (4 ft 8 1/2 in) standard gauge

The Baghdad Metro (Arabic: مترو بغداد), also known as Baghdad Elevated Train (BET) is a planned rapid transit public railway system consisting of an underground metro as well as an elevated railway in the Iraqi capital of Baghdad.

== History ==
Saddam Hussein launched the multi-billion-dollar subway project in 1983 to alleviate traffic congestion in Baghdad's streets, but it was cancelled because of the Iran–Iraq War.

At a December 2002 press conference, United States Defense Secretary Donald Rumsfeld spoke of "enormous miles and miles and miles of underground tunnelling" that prevented the United Nations from properly inspecting Saddam's WMD stocks. Hussein al-Shahristani, a scientist imprisoned by Saddam, told CBS's 60 Minutes, "We believe now it is more than 100 kilometres of very complex network, multilayer tunnels." However, following the 2003 US invasion, no significant stockpiles of WMDs were ever found in Iraq.

Since the 2003 Iraq War, traffic in Baghdad has increased significantly, because of the creation of the Green Zone, and the reduction of car-ownership regulations. In November 2008, Baghdad mayor Sabir Al-Isawi announced plans for $3 billion two-line extension that would break ground once funding is secured. One line would run from Sadr City (previously Al-Thawra or Saddam City) to Adhamiya, while the other would link the center of Baghdad with its western suburbs. Each line would have ~20 stations. In February 2011, an agreement was signed with Alstom, for the construction of a 25km line from central Baghdad to the northern suburbs of Adhamiya, Al-Hurriya, Kadhimiya, and Sha'ab. Later in 2011 Alstom and the Iraqi government signed a memorandum of understanding for Alstom to design, build, and operate a Baghdad–Basra high-speed rail line.

In 2019, it was confirmed that a French-South Korean consortium would begin ground work on the metro in 2020, at a cost of $2.5 billion.

In February 2022, it was announced the work would begin on the project in Q2 2022 and will finish in 2027, after sufficient funds for the project have been raised in the 2020-21 budgets and the future 2022 budget, which is still waiting for approval. The announcement came after the awarding of the projects to the French Alstom and the South Korean Hyundai.

In December 2022, it was announced that the Baghdad Metro would be included in the 2023 Ministry of Transport budget, the Metro will have 14 stations and will be 31km in length with construction starting in either 2023 or 2024. An announcement about the project was set to be made in Q1 of 2023.

In July 2024, it was announced that an international consortium consisting of French, Spanish and Turkish companies as well as Deutsche Bank were awarded $17.5 billion to construct Baghdad's metro. The project was predicated upon the scheme of design, build, finance, operate, maintain and transfer, and was estimated to be completed in May 2029.

In July 2025, the Prime Minister's advisor for transportation affairs, Nasir al-Asadi, announced that the government had decided to "re-evaluate the financial and technical standards" of the project, emphasizing the government's wish not to be cursory with its implementation of "a sensitive project directly linked to the movement of citizens and their daily commutes" that therefore "must be implemented and financed in a sound and thoughtful manner". al-Asadi also added that the project represented "the backbone of urban development" in Baghdad, and that "it must be built on precise and scientific foundations to ensure its efficiency and sustainability.".

== Development ==
In 2017, Metro Report stated that a memorandum of understanding for the development of urban rail projects in Baghdad and Basra had been signed by the Iraqi government and Alstom that year, for a 20km elevated light rail line in Baghdad that would link Mustansiriyah, Shaab, Wazireya, Alsarafiya bridge, Al-Khadimia, Al-Muthanna airport and Allawi.

As of February 2024, the current proposed plan consist of fully electric and automated (driverless) trains running on a railway system consisting of an underground tunnel portion as well as an elevated rail. It includes seven main lines with a total length of more than 148km, 64 metro stations, four workshops and depots for rolling stock and locomotives, numerous operations control centers (OCC), seven main power stations (MPS) with a capacity of 250MW, and several GSM towers.

The metro will be equipped with CCTV and internet as well as USB ports for charging, and special compartments will be allocated for women and children, as well as seats for people with special needs, pregnant women, and the elderly. The metro stations will be connected to other public transportation networks such as buses and taxis. The planned top speed will be 80–140 km/hour with an estimated 3.25 million riders per day.
