= Jafar Dhia Jafar =

Iraqi nuclear physicist (born 1942)

Acting Director of NRC
- In office January 1970 – July 1970

Personal details
- Born: August 25, 1942 (age 84) Baghdad, Kingdom of Iraq
- Education: University of Birmingham

Jafar Dhia Jafar (Arabic: جعفر ضياء جعفر; born in Baghdad on August 25, 1942) is an Iraqi nuclear physicist, former Vice Chairman of the Iraq Atomic Energy Commission, and chief of Iraq's nuclear program. He is widely known by American and international officials including UN Chief Inspector David Kay (1991-1992) as the father of the Iraqi Nuclear Program.

== Early life ==
Born in Baghdad, Jafar hails from a well-known, elite Shia family that had ties to the Iraqi monarchy. He's the second son of Dhia Jafar who was an Iraqi mechanical engineer with degrees from the University of Birmingham B.Sc.(1934) and Ph.D.(1936). Dhia worked in the Iraqi Railways, becoming its Director-General in 1946. Thereafter, he held many cabinet posts during the Kingdom of Iraq (1921–1958) that was overthrown by a military coup on July 14, 1958. Jafar Dhia Jafar completed primary education at a private school in Baghdad in June 1953, then went to Baghdad College (BC), a school established in 1932 by American Jesuits in association with Boston College. After completing intermediate education at BC in June 1956, Jafar Dhia Jafar traveled to England in July 1956, accompanied by his elder brother Yahya (DOB May 9, 1941) and enrolled at Seaford College, a boys boarding school in Sussex in September 1956. He showed interest in mathematics and science winning school prizes in mathematics and chemistry. Then he gained a place in the Physics Department at University of Birmingham

He spent his first Summer as an undergraduate working for Evershed & Vignoles, then two Summers working at the Rutherford Laboratory (Now Rutherford Appleton Laboratory) adjacent to A.E.R.E.Harwell. Then graduated with a B.Sc.(Hons.)in July 1962 to commence research for the Ph.D. at Birmingham using the 1 GeV Synchrotron, which was initiated by Professors Sir Mark Oliphant and Philip Burton Moon in the late forties producing first beams in 1953, that was accelerating protons and deuterons. This was the highest energy machine in the UK at the time to be superseded by the 7 GeV weak focusing synchrotron(Nimrod) in 1963/1964 at the Rutherford Appleton Laboratory. Doctoral advisors were Dr. H. B Van Der Raay and Professor William E.Burcham. Jafar participated in many experiments using beams of protons and deuterons. Moreover, he participated in one of the first experiments at Nimrod, elastic n-p charge exchange at 8 GeV/c within a group from RAL, UoB and University of Bristol. Jafar submitted his thesis (Some Elastic Nuclear Interactions at High Energies) and was awarded a Ph.D. in 1965. The external doctoral examiner was Professor Tony Skyrme.

== Professional work ==
Jafar earned a baccalaureate and a master's degree in physics from the University of Birmingham. He then completed a doctorate at Manchester in 1965. His first job was as an associate researcher at the Institute for Nuclear Physics in London University’s Imperial College. From October 1965, he was awarded a UoB research fellowship to continue work in nuclear physics using the UoB synchrotron. Experiments continued on small angle nucleon-nucleon scattering using sonic spark chambers during 1965/1966. In December 1966 Jafar resigned from this fellowship to return to Iraq with his small family. In February 1967 he was appointed as a research scientist at the Tuwaitha Nuclear Research Center (NRC) of the Iraqi Atomic Energy Commission(IAEC). The Tuwaitha site was under construction via a contract with Technopromexport, which was a Soviet Union engineering company in charge of foreign energy projects. The site comprised the IRT-2000 swimming pool research reactor with 2000 kW thermal power, radioisotope production facilities, a workshop, and an administration building. The research reactor was commissioned late in 1967. Jafar became head of the Physics Department at NRC in 1967 and worked towards the utilization of neutron beams from the reactor's horizontal channels. A two-axis neutron diffractometer capable of upgrade to three axes was set up as well as fast and slow pneumatic transfer systems for irradiation of samples for neutron activation analysis. Ge(Li) γ-ray detectors were used inside a large cylindrical three crystal NaI(Tl) scintillation detectors for pair and anti-compton γ-spectrometry to study radiative thermal neutron capture (n,γ) and inelastic fast neutron (n,n'γ) scattering using separated isotopes as targets. A cooperation agreement was signed with the Kurchatov Institute (KI) in Moscow for joint research in nuclear physics, where KI would loan NRC small quantities of separated isotopes to use as targets in experiments. Close cooperation continued between NRC and Professor L.V. Groshev and Dr. A.M. Demidov of KI for more than a decade. During 1969 Jafar was Acting Head of the Reactor Department at NRC, and from early 1970 until July, was also Acting Director of NRC .

== Imperial College London and CERN ==
During July 1970 Jafar resigned from NRC for family reasons as well as the heavy administrative load that left little time for research and traveled to join the family in England. In September 1970, Jafar became a research associate at the Physics Department of Imperial College London(ICL) and was seconded immediately to CERN in Geneva as a visiting scientist joining the high energy physics experimental group comprising ICL, ETH Zurich, CERN and Saclay Nuclear Research Centre(SNRC). Experiments at CERN utilized secondary beams produced from the strong focusing 30 GeV CERN Proton Synchrotron(PS). Negative particle beams of pions, kaons and antiprotons of 5 and 8 GeV/c were focused on a liquid hydrogen target. Also, a butanol frozen spin polarized target inside a 2 tesla magnetic fields were used. Neutral final states were selected through an electronic trigger system and V particle decays were registered inside conventional spark chambers, placed within a magnetic field, viewed stereoscopically by a fast film camera. This film was developed and scanned using a Hough-Powell (HPD) device. During this period Jafar was also active in developing a high efficiency large area scintillation detector for slow K+ mesons that could be used as part of a trigger in selecting K-p→≡*-K+ interactions. This detector was successfully tested inside the superconducting CERN Omega Spectrometer.

== Return to Iraq ==
In November 1974, Jafar applied unsuccessfully for a permanent academic position at ICL. Then in December 1974, Jafar was contacted by Iraq's Consul General in Geneva, Mr. Nabil Najim Al-Tikriti, to convey a message from Iraq's Vice President, Saddam Hussein, requesting Jafar to return to Iraq at the earliest. This was a request that must not be refused but Jafar informed that a notice period of at least 6 months must be given to ICL. Within a week Jafar informed Mr. Nabil that he will return to Baghdad by April 1975 and also accepted an invitation to be one of the main invited speakers at an international conference organised by IAEC to be held in Baghdad around the same time. Jafar was appointed Chief Research Scientist at NRC and commenced upgrading the IRT-2000 neutron beam research facilities and supported a project to upgrade the reactor's thermal power to 5MW, which was completed during 1978.

Following the signature of a nuclear cooperation agreement between IAEC and the French CEA(Now French Alternative Energies and Atomic Energy Commission). IAEC decided to purchase from France a high neutron flux reactor, similar to Osiris/Isis at SNRC, to be built at a site within NRC in Tuwaitha. The thermal power of the Iraqi reactor, Tammuz-1, was 40 MW whereas Osiris was 70 MW and Tammuz-2 was an adjacent core mock-up, similar to Isis, with 500 kW thermal power. The reactor's fuel was U-Al alloy enriched to 93%. Tammuz-1 differed substantially from Osiris because it was equipped with horizontal beam neutron channels plus a 0.7m3 heavy water tank with a cold and a hot neutron source. The project included hot laboratories and a radioactive waste treatment station. The technical part of the contract was signed by Jafar on November 18, 1976 at a price of circa 400 MUSD to be implemented over 48 months. This project was entirely under an International Atomic Energy Agency Safeguards agreement.

On December 4, 1979 a colleague, Dr. Hussain al-Shahristani, was arrested, while working at NRC, by an order from the General Security Directorate. On December 8, 1979 Jafar wrote a memorandum to President Saddam Hussein informing that Dr. Shahristani was not known to have any anti-Government political activity and that he was an important member of NRC's top scientific staff requesting his release and return to work. A week or so later, Jafar sent a second memorandum to the President with the same request, but to no avail.

Towards the end of December 1979, Jafar arranged for both of his young boys (Sadiq 14 years and Amin 13 years) to travel to England to join their English mother who was already in England receiving medical treatment. Both sons were enrolled in Seaford College, where Jafar was educated two decades before and surprisingly under the same headmaster (The Revd Charles Johnson). On Thursday, January 17, 1980 Jafar was escorted from NRC by one plain clothes officer from the Intelligence Service (Mukhabarat) ostensibly for a five minute questioning session. However, Jafar was held incommunicado without any questioning at the Mukhabarat detention centre in the Saadoun area. After a few months, Jafar was moved to a Mukhabarat safe house in the Masbah area of Baghdad with six guards, including a cook, on duty. Papers, books, television and phone calls were permitted within the house fence, which included a large garden. During this period of detention, Jafar was taken to meet with Barzan Al-Tikriti, Saddam’s half-brother and Head of Mukhabarat a few times. This detention was said to be to secure his safety. On June 7, 1981, Israel bombed Iraq’s reactor complex in Tuwaitha that was nearing completion. Early in September 1981, Jafar was taken to meet with President Saddam Hussein at the Presidential Palace in the presence of Barzan Al- Tikriti. During this meeting, Saddam Hussein tasked Jafar to develop a clandestine nuclear programme leading eventually to a weapon relying entirely on Iraqi manpower. After this meeting Jafar returned home and resumed work at NRC within a few days.

== Iraq’s National Nuclear Program ==
A decree issued in December 1981 by IAEC established a new Directorate of Studies and Development headed by Jafar, which was later referred to as Directorate 3000. This new Directorate operated in parallel to NRC. Many of NRC’s senior staff were transferred to the new Directorate. A review of uranium enrichment technologies led to the adoption of the electromagnetic process as well as gas diffusion for the R&D effort. Centrifuge technology was considered to be beyond reach without external assistance from European or Russian sources. Laser and chemical technologies were also probed. From 1988 onwards, chemical enrichment was adopted for serious R&D work. Detailed studies of the gas diffusion process focused on the development of a suitable porous barrier that allows non-viscous molecular flow of uranium hexafluoride(UF6) at the operating conditions of a plant comprising several hundred separation stages. Various types of barriers were tested and anodic aluminium showed promise. However, electromagnetic separation was easier to develop with fewer unknowns. Its main difficulty was the large and heavy equipment sizes. A uranium ion focusing angle of π√2 was chosen instead of the usual π focusing in order to provide greater separative power. Conventional water cooled copper conductors were used for the magnet coils. Three stages of development were adopted beginning with a laboratory spectrometer model of 0.4m radius then demonstration models of 1m and 0.5m radii to be followed by production models of 1.2m and 0.6m radii.

== War and aftermath ==
After the war, Jafar insisted that Iraqi WMD's were destroyed in 1991 and that Iraq did not attempt to restart its program after that date.
