= Iraqi State Railways PC class =

Class of steam locomotives in Iraq

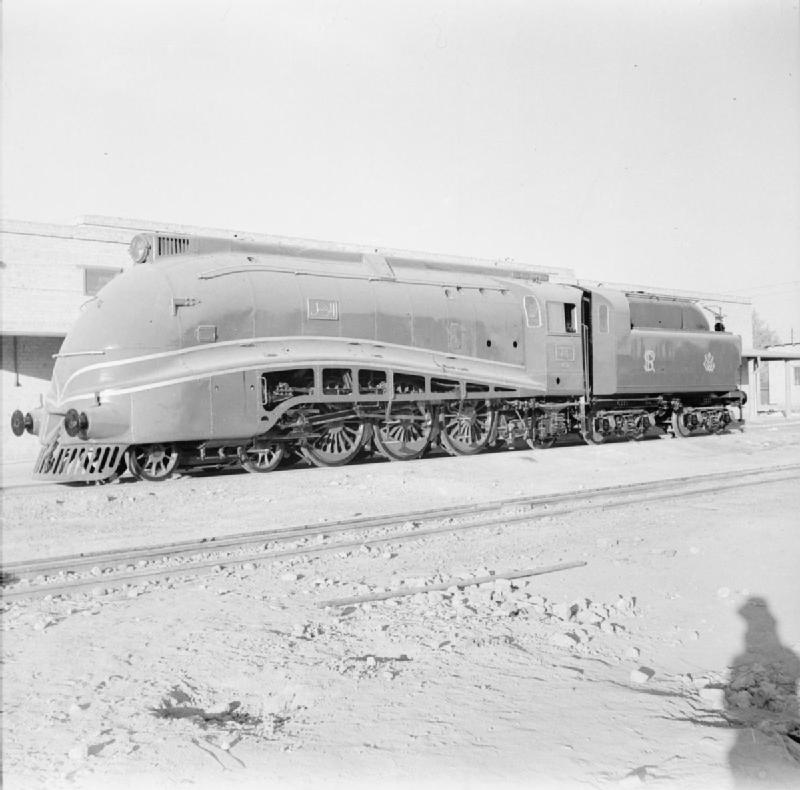
- A PC class locomotive in June 1943
Type and origin
- Power type: Steam
- Builder: Robert Stephenson and Hawthorns
- Serial number: 6982–6985
- Build date: 1940
- Total produced: 4
Specifications
- Configuration
  - Whyte: 4-6-2
  - UIC: 2′C1′ h2
- Gauge: 1,435 mm (4 ft 8 1/2 in)
- Driver dia.: 69 in (1,753 mm)
- Axle load: 17.5 long tons (17.8 t)
- Loco weight: 98.7 long tons (100.3 t)
- Firebox
  - Grate area: 31.2 sq ft (2.90 m^{2})
- Boiler pressure: 220 lbf/in^{2} (1.52 MPa)
- Heating surface: 2,706 sq ft (251.4 m^{2})
- Cylinder size: 21 in × 26 in (533 mm × 660 mm)
Career
- Operators: Iraqi State Railways
- Class: PC
- Number in class: 4
- Delivered: 1941
- Disposition: 1 lost en route, remainder withdrawn

The PC class was a type of standard gauge passenger steam locomotive on Iraqi State Railways. In 1940 the ISR completed the Baghdad Railway between Baghdad and Tel Kotchek on the border with Syria, enabling the Taurus Express to start running between Istanbul and Baghdad. In 1941 Robert Stephenson and Hawthorns built four Pacific locomotives for ISR to haul the new through service on the Iraqi section of its route.

RSH streamlined the PC class to resemble British passenger express Pacifics, with a nose rounded like the LMS Coronation Class and valancing styled like the LNER Class A4. However, whereas the LMS and LNER classes had 6-foot-8-inch (2,032 mm) or 6-foot-9-inch (2,057 mm) driving wheels, the PC class had 5-foot-9-inch (1,753 mm) driving wheels: a size akin to those on mixed traffic locomotives in Great Britain.

The tender was mounted on bogie trucks for smooth riding: a refinement that the tenders of LMS and LNER streamliners lacked. The PC class tender was equipped with a tender cab in case the locomotive needed to run tender-first.

The PC class were named after Iraq's four principal cities: Baghdad, Mosul, Basra and Kirkuk. 502 El Mosul was the first to be delivered, in March 1941. Thereafter the April 1941 Iraqi coup d'état installed a government allied to Fascist Italy and Nazi Germany and delivery of the remaining members of the class was delayed until after the British invasion of Iraq in May 1941 and invasion of Vichy-ruled Syria and Lebanon in June and July. 501 Baghdad was delivered in October 1941 and 503 El Basra in December. 504 Kirkuk was lost en route and did not enter service. Early in 1948 Iraqi State Railways renumbered its locomotive fleet and 501–503 became 1501–1503.

From 1961 onwards diesel locomotives were introduced on standard gauge lines in Iraq and steam locomotives including the PC class were withdrawn. In March 1967 locomotives 1501, 1502 and 1503 were disused, stored at Shalchiyah railway works and awaiting disposal. 1501 Baghdad and 1502 El Mosul were intact and 1503 El Basrah was partly dismantled.

== Locomotive data ==
Builder's no.	1941 fleet no.	1948 fleet no.	Name	Entered Service	Disposal
6982	501	1501	بغداد (Bagdad)	October 1941	In storage March 1967
6983	502	1502	الموصل (El Mosul)	March 1941	In storage March 1967
6984	503	1503	البصرة (El Basra)	December 1941	In storage March 1967
6985	504	――	كركوك (Kirkuk)	lost en route	――

== Bibliography ==
- Hughes, Hugh (1981). Middle East Railways. Continental Railway Circle. pp. 90, 97, 98. ISBN 0-9503469-7-7.
