= Dhia Jafar =

Iraqi engineer and statesman

- ضياء جعفر

Minister of Development
- In office May 19, 1958 – July 14, 1958
- Prime Minister: Ahmed Baban

Minister of Economy
- In office March 3, 1958 – May 19, 1958
- Prime Minister: Nuri al-Said

Minister of Development
- In office December 17, 1955 – March 3, 1958
- Prime Minister: Nuri al-Said

Minister of Finance
- In office September 3, 1954 – December 17, 1955
- Prime Minister: Nuri al-Said

Minister of Economy
- In office January 6, 1949 – September 15, 1953
- Prime Minister: Nuri al-Said; Tawfeeq Al-Suwaidi; Jamil al-Midfai

Ministry of Works & Transport
- In office March 29, 1947 – January 27, 1948
- Prime Minister: Salih Jabr

Personal details
- Born: 1910 Baghdad, Ottoman Empire
- Died: 1992 (aged 81–82) London, England
- Relatives: Majid Jafar (grandson); Badr Jafar (grandson); Abdul Saleh al-Killidar (first cousin)

Sayyid Dhia Jafar Hasem al-Musawi (Arabic: ضياء جعفر هاشم الموسوي; 1910–1992) was an Iraqi engineer and statesman who held various ministerial positions during the monarchy in Iraq. He was closely connected to Nuri Al-Said and Iraq's last King Faisal II. He was a cabinet minister from 1947 to 1958, serving as Minister of Transport, Economy, Finance and later as Minister of Development.

== Early life and education ==
Dhia Jafar was born to Jafar Hashem and Kheja al-Astarabadi. His father was a merchant, from a notable family in Al-Kadhimiya, that claim agnatic descent from Musa al-Kadhim through his son Ibrahim al-Mortada Al-Asghar, who was the ruler of Yemen and then of Mecca in the wake of the Third Hijri century. His mother was the daughter of the renowned merchant Abd al-Hadi al-Astarabadi. His maternal uncle, Mahmoud al-Astarabadi was a member of the senate in the royal era for the city of Kadhimiya. His maternal cousin, Abd al-Saleh al-Killidar, was the custodian of the Imam Husayn shrine.

=== Education ===
Jafar grew up in Baghdad and completed his school education there. He then studied English at the American University of Beirut and subsequently obtained a degree in mechanical engineering from the University of Birmingham. He was the first Iraqi to hold a scientific PhD in engineering.

== Career ==
=== Early career ===
Returning from his studies in England, Jafar started his career working in different engineering jobs and was eventually tasked with railway engineering and development of the Iraqi railway system.

Together with fellow engineers, he founded the Industrial Engineering School in Baghdad, the first industrial school in Iraq.

Jafar became friends with Prime Minister Nuri al-Said, after having worked with his son Sabah As-Said. Al-Said supported Jafar and a group of fellow young and well educated men.

=== Political career ===
Jafar served as a cabinet minister in Iraq from 1947 to 1958, heading the Ministry of Transport and Works, the Ministry of Economy, the Ministry of Finance and the Ministry of Development.

==== Minister of Transport and Works ====
Jafar was appointed as Minister of Transport and Works in March 1947 by Salih Jabr. During his tenure as Minister of Transport and Works, Jafar pushed for the nationalization of technical education and expertise and began negotiations with the British Government and British oil companies.

==== Minister of Economy ====
Jafar was appointed as Minister of Economy in the early 1950s and continued to lead the intense oil negotiations on the side of the Iraqi delegation, which lasted for more than three years and resulted in a landmark 50/50 profit-sharing agreement in 1951. Al-Said and Jafar coined the term "Oil of Arabs".

==== Minister of Finance ====
Jafar was appointed as Minister of Finance during the 10th ministry of Nuri al-Said. He held the same position again in the 12th ministry from August 1954 and resigned in December 1955. One of Jafar's main projects as Minister of Finance was the establishment of a gold standard for the Iraqi Dinar, disconnecting the currency from sterling.

==== Minister of Development and Development Board ====
During his time as cabinet minister and especially as Minister of Development, Jafar was involved in the architectural and infrastructural advancement, reshaping and reconstruction of Iraq in general and Baghdad in particular. He was a central member of the Development Board, an organization and planning body of decision-makers, technical experts and politicians around Prime Minister Nuri as-Said. The board, which also seated members from the United States and the United Kingdom, was set up in 1950 to strategically invest the resources from the new oil agreement into important long-range development objectives for Iraq and was in tenure until 1958.

Following the profit-sharing agreement with Britain, Iraq's income from oil rose from 6.7 million dinars in 1950 to 161.5 million in 1955, out of which 70% were redirected to the Development Board. An architectural "Master Plan for Baghdad" was commissioned by the Development Board in 1954 and presented in 1956. It was consisted of changes to Baghdad's road and bridge system, housing, industry, commerce and a wide range of new buildings, including schools, shops, clinics, car parks, factories and government buildings. Several important buildings and structures were planned and erected in cooperation with known architects like Le Corbusier, Gio Ponti and Frank Lloyd Wright.

Prominent projects from the Development Board are the Tharthar Project, inaugurated in 1956, the Habbaniyah Project, the Ramadi Barrage and the Queen Alia Bridge (renamed to Jumhuriya Bridge later), inaugurated in March 1957.

From 1957 – 1958, Jafar served as president of the Society of Iraqi Engineers.

Jafar was reappointed as Minister of Development in May 1958.

At the time of the 1958 Iraqi Military Coup, Jafar was receiving medical treatment in London and subsequently exiled himself in the UK.

=== Civilian life ===
Jafar returned to Iraq in 1962, establishing an architectural office in Baghdad.

== Personal life ==
Jafar moved to the emirate of Sharjah in 1969 and later back to London again, where he died in December 1992 during surgery.

=== Family ===
Jafar married the daughter of Hamid Khan, a cousin of the Aga Khan who was a government agent in Najaf from 1917, appointed CIE in 1921 and became the first mutassarif (governor) of Karbala during the royal era.

Among their children are:

- Yahya, a businessman and currently Executive Director of Uruk Group.
- Jafar, a scientist and former Vice Chairman of the Iraq Atomic Energy Commission and chief of Iraq's nuclear program and later Co-founder and CEO of Uruk Group.
- Hamid, the founder and chairman of the Board of Directors of the Crescent Group, and the chairman of Dana Gas. Hamid Dhia Jafar has two sons:
  - Majid and Badr who are businessmen with Emirati citizenship and serve on the board of directors of Crescent, and his daughter Razan Jafar is a member of the group's Board.

== Books ==
- Dhia Jafar Biography and Memoirs notes, by Imad Abdel Salam Raouf.
- Dhia Jafar and his political and economic role in Iraq, by Haider Farooq Al-Samarrai.
