= Transport in Iraq =

Transportation networks and infrastructure in Iraq

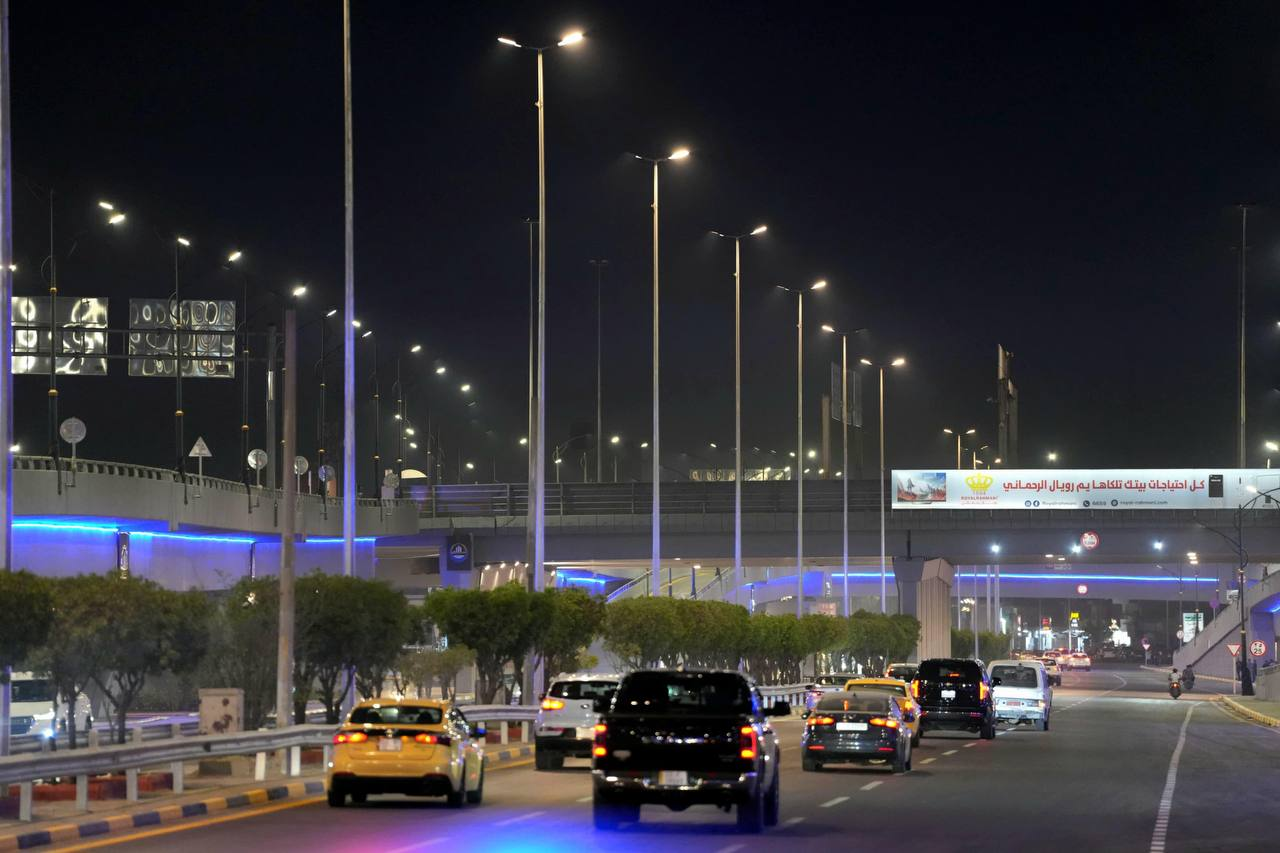
A modern highway in Baghdad, illuminated at night with active traffic and urban lighting.

Transport in Iraq consists of railways, highways, waterways, pipelines, ports and harbors, marines and airports.

== Railways ==
total: 2,272 km
standard gauge: 2,272 km 4 ft 8 1/2 in (1,435 mm) standard gauge

The Baghdad Metro (Arabic: مترو بغداد), also known as Baghdad Elevated Train (BET) is a planned rapid transit public railway system consisting of an underground metro as well as an elevated railway in the Iraqi capital of Baghdad. In July 2024, it was announced that an international consortium consisting of French, Spanish and Turkish companies as well as Deutsche Bank were awarded $17.5 billion to implement the Baghdad Metro project. The project is estimated to be completed by May 2029.

A 37 km monorail is planned in Najaf, which would link three Shi'ite holy sites.

The first Iraqi Republic Railways train to Basra since the overthrow of Saddam Hussein's regime arrived on 26 April 2003. British troops hope to use the 68 km long railway to transport much-needed aid supplies from the port town of Umm Qasr to Basra.

In June 2011, it was announced that planning had begun for a new high-speed rail line between Baghdad and Basra, with a memorandum of understanding with Alstom having been signed.

=== Maps ===
- UNHCR Atlas Map
- UN Map

=== Railway links with adjacent countries ===
All adjacent countries generally use 4 ft 8 1/2 in (1,435 mm) standard gauge, but may vary in couplings. Neighbours with electrified railways – Turkey and Iran – both use the world standard 25 kVAC

- Turkey – via Syria
- Iran – one link partially under construction and a second link planned
  - Iraq-Iran Basra-Shalamcheh line – under construction
  - Kermanshah, Iran, and the Iraqi province of Diyala – construction commenced.
- Kuwait – no railways
- Saudi Arabia -
- Jordan – partially constructed – break of gauge 4 ft 8 1/2 in (1,435 mm) standard gauge/1,050 mm (3 ft 5 11/32 in) gauge
- Syria – same gauge – at Rabiaa/al-Ya'rubiya

== Road Transport ==
An overland trans-desert bus service between Beirut, Haifa, Damascus and Baghdad was established by the Nairn Transport Company of Damascus in 1923.

=== Roads ===
total: 55,100 km
paved: 40,362 km,
unpaved: 10,274 km (2025)

== Waterways ==
5,729 km (Euphrates River (2,815 km), Tigris River 1,899 km, Third River (565 km)); Shatt al Arab is usually navigable by maritime traffic for about 130 km. The channel has been dredged to 3 m and is in use. The Tigris and Euphrates Rivers have navigable sections for shallow-draft watercraft; the Shatt al Basrah canal was navigable by shallow-draft craft before closing in 1991 because of the Gulf War.

== Pipelines ==
crude oil 5,432 km; natural gas 2,455 km; refined products 1,637 km; liquid petroleum gas 913 km

== Ports and harbors ==
=== Persian Gulf ===
- Umm Qasr Port
- Khawr az Zubayr
- Al Basrah has limited functionality
- Grand Faw Port (Under construction)

== Merchant marine ==
total: 32 ships (with a volume of 1,000 gross tonnage (GT) or over) totaling 606,227 GT/1,067,770 tonnes deadweight (DWT)
ships by type: cargo ship 14, passenger ship 1, passenger/cargo 1, petroleum tanker 13, refrigerated cargo 1, roll-on/roll-off ship 2 (1999 est.)

== Airports ==
Iraq has about 104 airports as of 2012. Major airports include:

- Baghdad International Airport
- Basra International Airport
- Mosul International Airport
- Erbil International Airport
- Duhok International Airport (under construction)
- Sulaimaniyah International Airport
- Najaf International Airport

=== Airports – with paved runways ===
Total	75
over 3,047 m	20
2,438 to 3,047 m	36
1,524 to 2,437 m	5
914 to 1,523 m	6
under 914 m	6

=== Airports – with unpaved runways ===
Total	29
over 3,047 m	3
2,438 to 3,047 m	4
1,524 to 2,437 m	3
914 to 1,523 m	13
under 914 m	6

=== Heliports ===
81 (2025)

== See also ==
- Iraq
- Iraqi Republic Railways
