= IRR Southern Line =

Railway line in Iraq

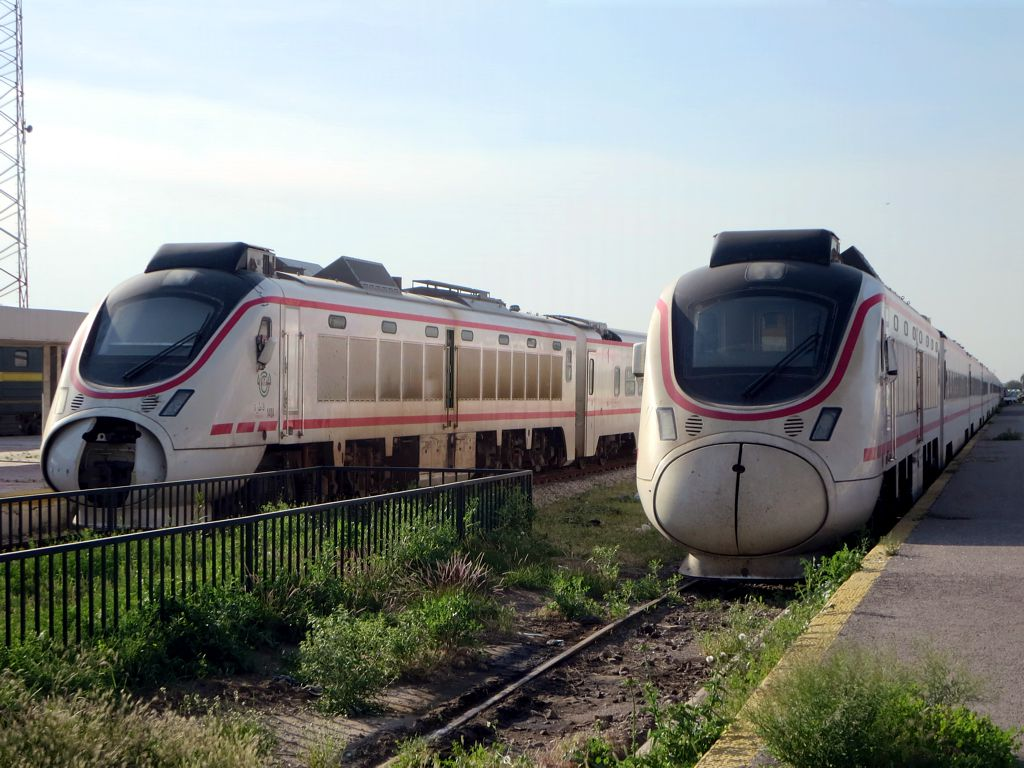
The diesel multi-units used on the service.

The IRR Southern Line, also known as the Baghdad–Basra Railway Line (Route Number 2), is a railway line between the Iraqi capital of Baghdad and the port city of Basra in Iraq. The line is roughly 550 kilometres (340 mi) long, with intermediate stops including Karbala, Musayyib, Diwaniya, Samawah, Nasiriya and Um Qasr. A proposal was put forward to convert the railway route to high-speed rail and connect the city of Najaf, but the plan was never realised. Next to the commuter train to Falluja, it is one of the two only routes in Iraq that service passengers.

== Technical specifications ==
The line was planned to be high-speed, allowing a top speed of 250 km/h (155 mph), but currently operates at an average speed of 65 km/h (40 mph) and a top speed of 125 km/h (78 mph).

The Railway has a total trackage of 609 kilometres (378 mi) with 39 stations along the main route, one along the Karbala Branch and 4 along the 56 kilometres (35 mi) Um Qasr Branch. The rails have a UIC 60 profile with welded joints along the main branch designed for high-speed and heavy freight services. The axle load is 25 tons. Along the Um Qasr Branch the joints are coupled.

Along the line, two heavy maintenance factories have been built, one in Baghdad and the other in Samawa, right in the middle between Baghdad and Basra. There are also two light maintenance workshops, one in Baghdad and the other in Basra.

The line had a semiautomatic block relay signalling system installed in 1975, as well as sound cables running along the tracks providing communication between the stations and locomotives.

== History ==
=== Metre gauge ===
The first metre-gauge railway connection between the two cities was built during the First World War in the Mesopotamian Campaign. Subsequently, under British administration the ‘Mesopotamian Railways’ (MR), later ‘Iraqi State Railways’ (ISR) and after 1958 until today the ‘Iraqi Republic Railways’ (IRR), operated the rail. Installations built by the military during the war were also included in the construction. The last gap for a through connection between Baghdad and Basra was closed in 1924. This track remained in use until 1968 when it was abandoned in favour of the new standard-gauge line.

=== Standard gauge ===
In the 1960s, the IRR built a standard-gauge track between Baghdad and Basra. It was initially opened on March 10th, 1964, for freight traffic only. Passenger services began on April 25th, 1968 and the metre-gauge railway was closed to traffic shortly thereafter.

During the Gulf War, the railway line was so severely damaged that train services were suspended - presumably shortly after American intervention. After the end of the war, repairs were carried out and trains were running again starting on May 22nd, 1991.

The unstable political and economic situation in Iraq resulted in the reliability of the service being so poor that timetables did not indicate an arrival time beforehand over the last few decades. A journey time of over a day for the entire route was not unusual.

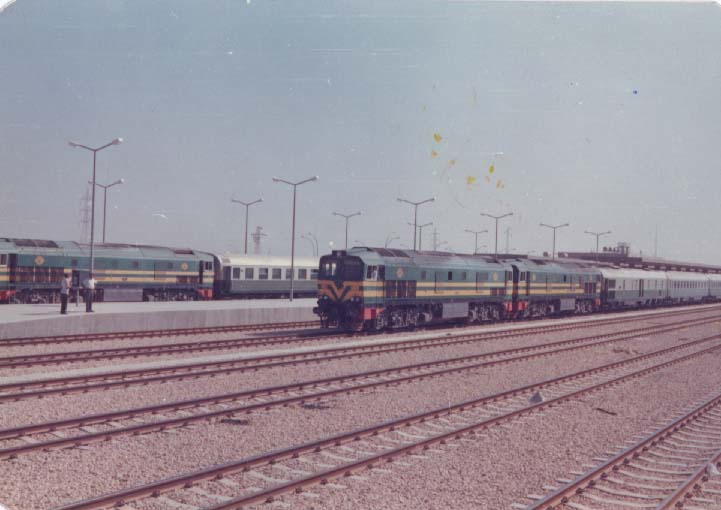
Samawa Railway Station prior to the Gulf War

=== High speed train ===
The construction of a high-speed line was discussed in 2011, but not pursued further. In 2023, it was discussed again. The line was first announced by Thierry Mariani, a French junior transport minister, at the 2011 Paris Air Show on 24 June 2011. He said that French company Alstom and the Iraqi government had signed a memorandum of understanding (MOU) regarding a contract to build the proposed line and that Alstom would conduct exclusive talks with the Iraqi government for a year.

== Service and recent progress ==
There is one train service per day, taking 8–12 hours, in each direction. The Baghdad to Basra train starts at Baghdad Central Station at 8 pm and arrives at Basra Al Maqal Railway Station at 4:30 am. In reverse, the Basra to Baghdad train starts at 7 pm and arrives in Baghdad at 6:15 am.

There are four categories of tickets on the line. A two-berth sleeper accommodation costs 37,000 IQD (28 USD) and a four-berth sleeper ticket costs 31,000 IQD (24 USD). Second-class seating tickets each cost 10,000 IQD (8 USD) and first-class options cost 15,000 IQD (11 USD).

Tea, kebabs or other snacks can be purchased in the dining car.

In 2014, IRR received the first of an order of 10 new trains from CRRC Qingdao Sifang. The trainsets consist of two diesel-powered locomotives and eight steel-bodied trailers and are specifically built to resist the high temperatures and wind-blown dust of Iraq's desert environment.

Also, there are currently renovation efforts, such as to fully double track the railway, construct new bridges, embankments and culverts and all of the engineering was done in-house by the IRR.

== Trivia ==
In an incident in 1917, local tribesmen stole a temporary halt for firewood use, which was later humorously picked up by magazines, as the material of the station "was too valuable to be left unattended in the cold Mesopotamian winter evenings". Later, the halt was abandoned.

Also a common occurrence on the railway is boys throwing stones at the train, often damaging windows in the 'game'.
