= Rabia, Iraq =

Rabia
- Town
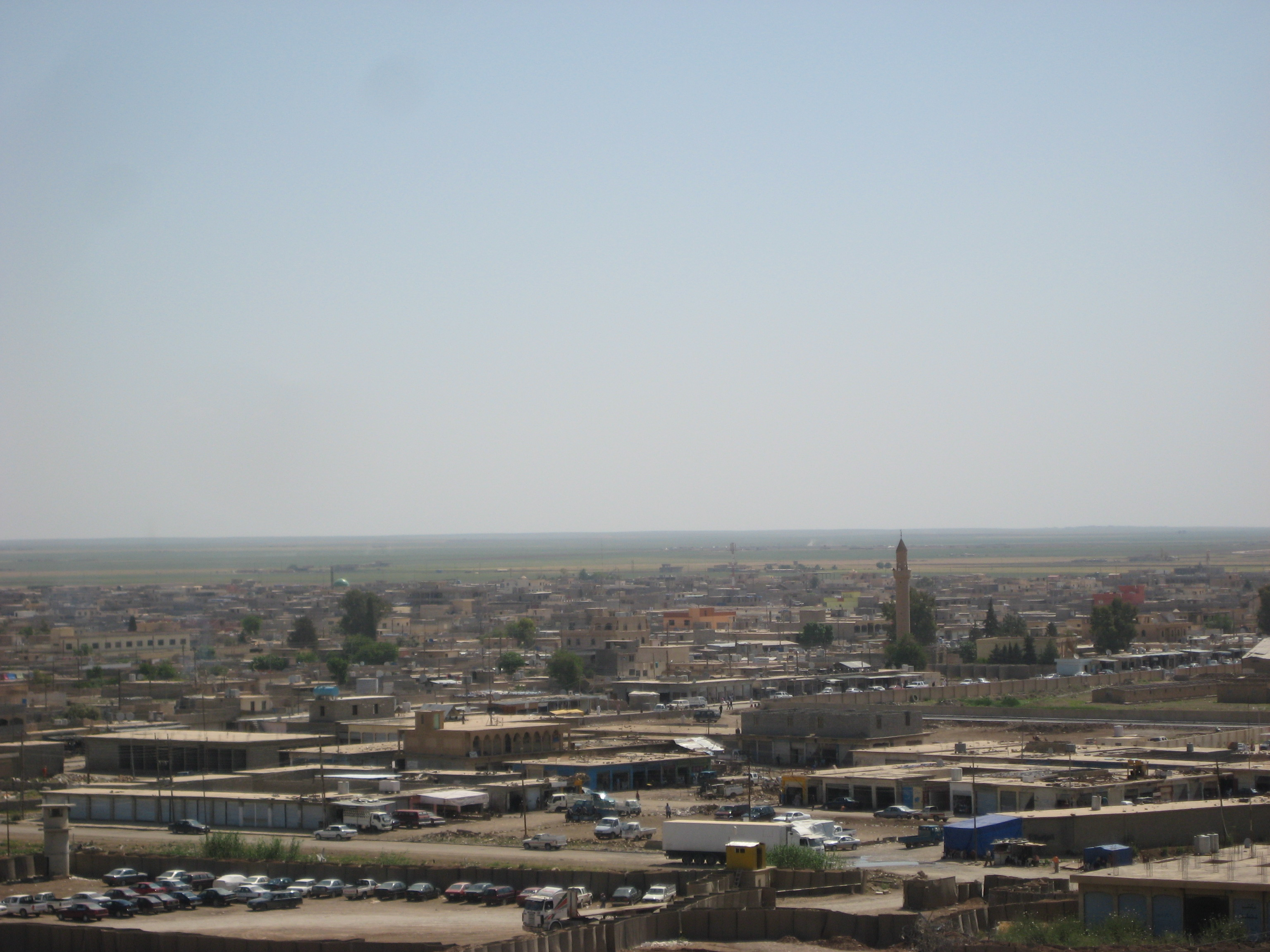
- View of Rabia's eastern side

- Location within Iraq
- Coordinates: 36°48′17″N 42°5′20″E
- Country: Iraq
- Governorate: Nineveh Governorate
- District: Tel Afar District

Rabia (Arabic: ربيعة) is a town in the north-west of Iraq, near the border crossing to the town of Al-Yarubiyah in Syria. Both towns are inhabited by the Shammar Arab tribe. Rabia is located on the road between Al-Shaddadah in Syria and Mosul in Iraq.

The town's primary economic sector is illegal smuggling, though there are legitimate freight and human migration between Syria and Iraq. Migrants are scanned using retina scanning technology.

In August 2003, Syria inaugurated the Rabia railway station. It was announced that there would be two goods' trains a week, with a passenger service to follow. As of October 2009, the passenger train was arriving at the Rabiyah station on Wednesday afternoons in the direction of Damascus and on Saturday mornings in the direction of Mosul. The standard gauge railway line from Rabia, part of the Baghdad Railway, is linked to Baghdad via Mosul.

The border crossing was redesigned during the Iraq troop surge operation in 2007 and subsequently attacked by an individual wearing a suicide vest. The explosion destroyed a building used for processing personnel through the crossing point, damaged several other buildings, and caused several casualties, including a civilian contractor working for the U.S. military forces there.

The town was previously controlled by Peshmerga forces from June 2014 until October 2017 when it returned to the control of the Iraqi government.

During the Syrian civil war (October 2014) Western newspapermen reported on fighting at Rabia between ISIS jihadists and Kurdish Peshmerga forces resulting in the expulsion of the jihadist forces.
