= Baghdad Central Station =

Railway station in Baghdad, Iraq

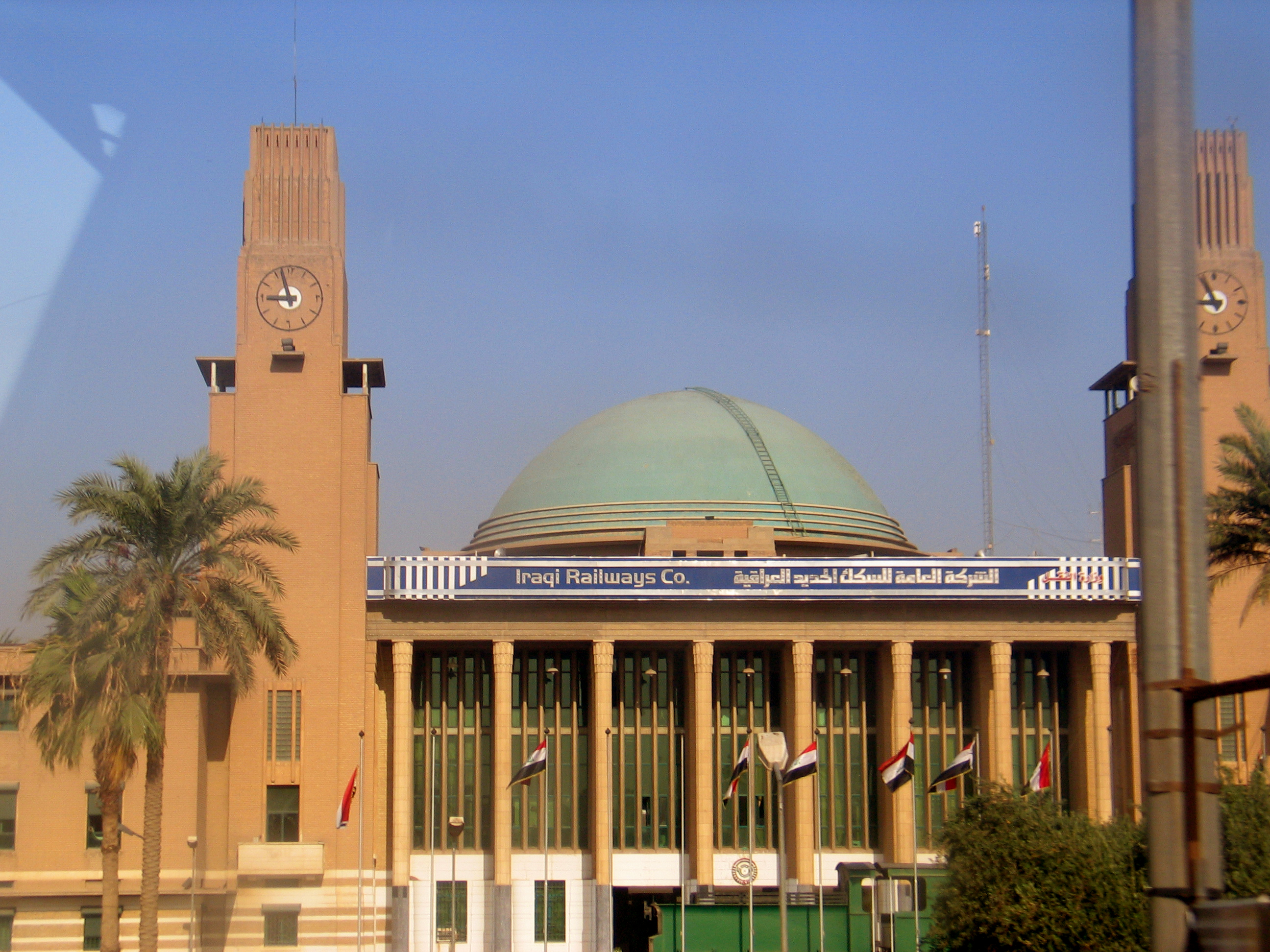
- Exterior of the station in 2017

General information
- Location: Qahira Street, Sheik Maaruf, Baghdad; Iraq
- Coordinates: 33°19′25″N 44°22′49″E
- System: Central station
- Owner: Iraqi Railways
- Platforms: 4

Construction
- Structure type: Domed structure
- Platform levels: 3

History
- Opened: 1953
Location

Baghdad Central Station or Baghdad International Station is the main train station in Baghdad. It links the rail network to the south and the north of Iraq. The station was built by the British and designed by J. M. Wilson, a Scot who had been an assistant to Lutyens in New Delhi and who subsequently set up a practice of his own in Baghdad. It has been described as the "Crown Jewel" of Baghdad by the BBC. Construction started in 1948 and finished in 1953. The station is the biggest one in Iraq. It was renovated during the American occupation of Iraq in the 2000s.

== History ==
The train station was planned by British architects and originally built by the British. It was considered as the "Jewel of Baghdad" for daily travelers. Historically passengers from Bagdhad were able to reach Jerusalem as well as London onboard luxury trains. The station offered telegraph services, it had also a bank, a post office, a saloon, shopping areas and a restaurant. The station even had an office with printing presses which are still printing the train tickets.

After the 2003 U.S.-led invasion of Iraq, thieves snatched the station's furniture, lighting fixtures and even bathroom plumbing.

As of 2016, the Iraqi train fleet is made of only 6 trains, with only 1 overnight train operation, from Baghdad to Basra.

== Renovations ==
A $5.9 million renovation began in 2004 and was completed in June 2006. The renovation included all-new power plant and air conditioning system. The electrical, water, and sewer lines were replaced. The restaurant was rehabilitated and the roof, the windows and the plaster walls were replaced. All clocks were replaced and connected to one new central system. Also, the broken mosaic floor tiles were replaced.

A new entrance was constructed. Two new seven-passenger elevators, new bathrooms and a hotel with 13 rooms were added along with a new fire alarm and sprinkler system

== Gallery ==
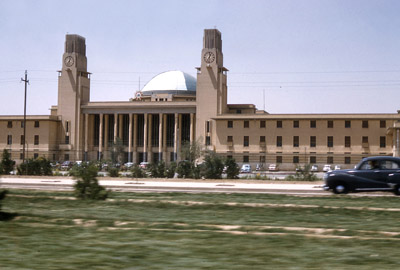
Baghdad Central Station, 1959

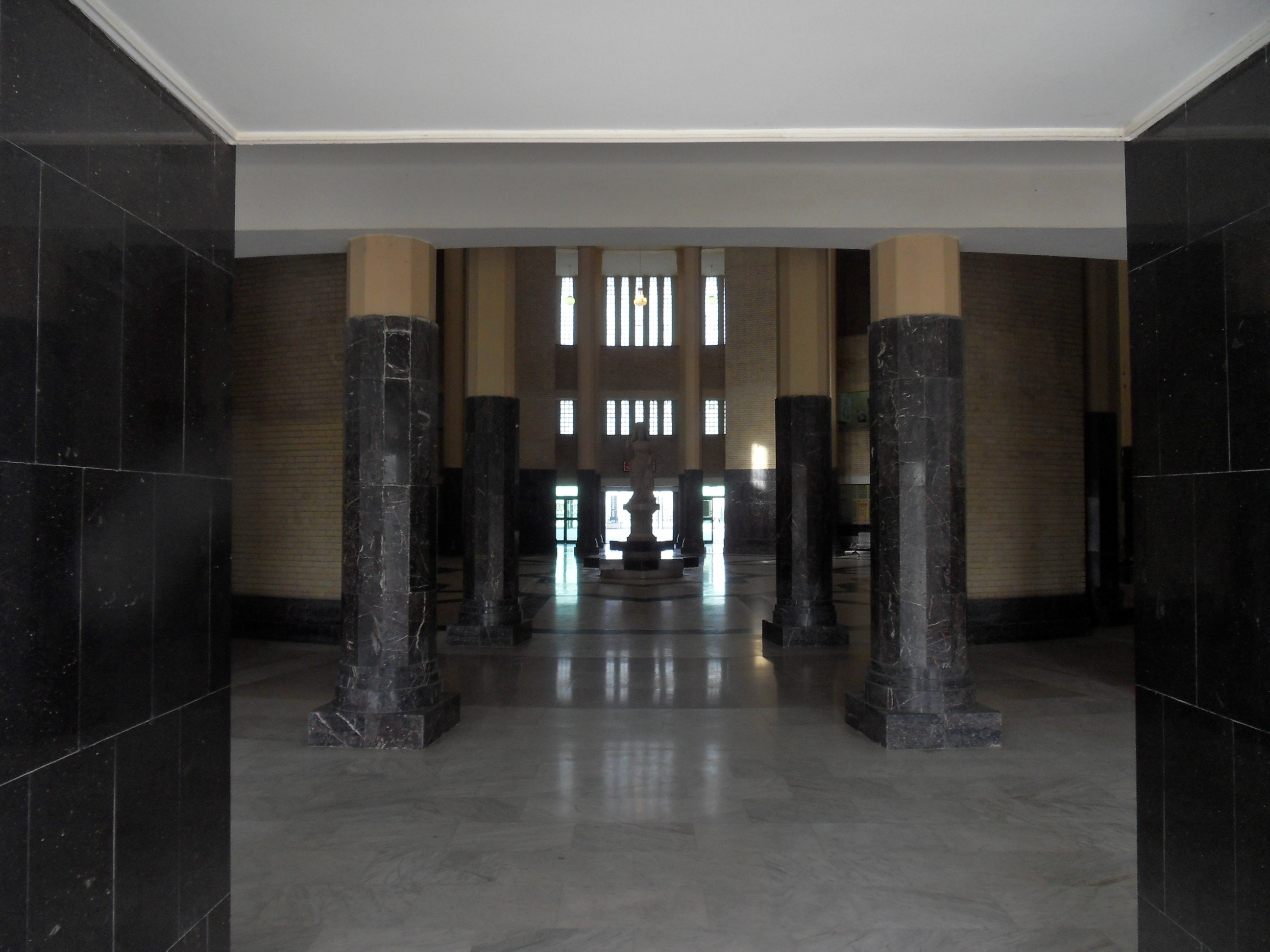
Inside of the Station, 2010

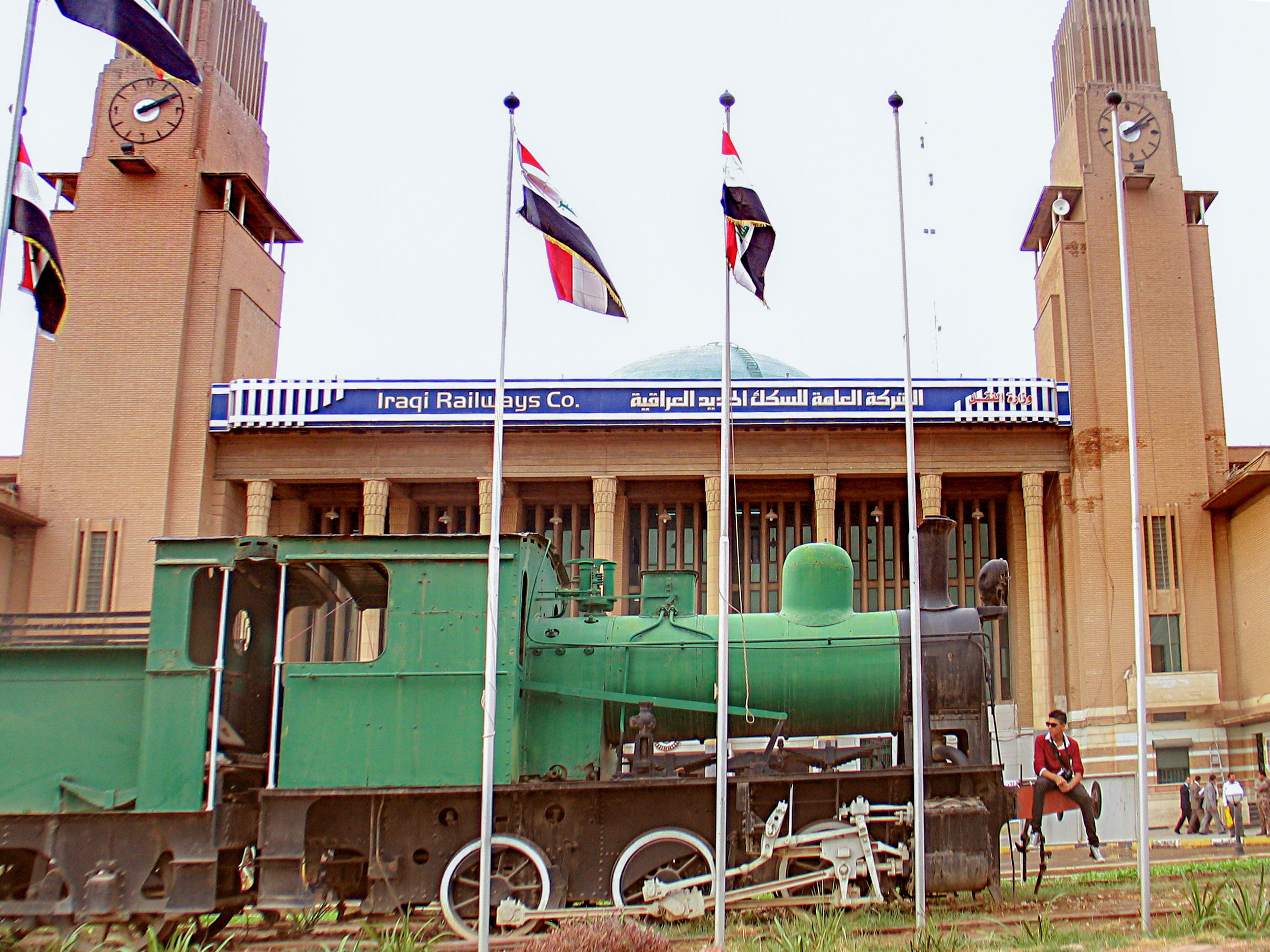
Main entrance, 2012

== See also ==
- Iraqi Republic Railways
- Railway stations in Iraq
- Baghdad Metro
