= Al Maqal railway station =

Railway station in Basrah, Iraq

Al-Maqal

General information
- Location: Basra; Iraq
- Coordinates: 30.55992°N 47.78467°E
- Owner: Iraqi Republic Railways
Location

Al-Maqal Station is the main train station in Basrah. It links the rail network of the south to Baghdad and the north of Iraq.

== See also ==
- Iraqi Republic Railways
- Railway stations in Iraq
