= Iraqi Republic Railways =

State-owned railway company of Iraq

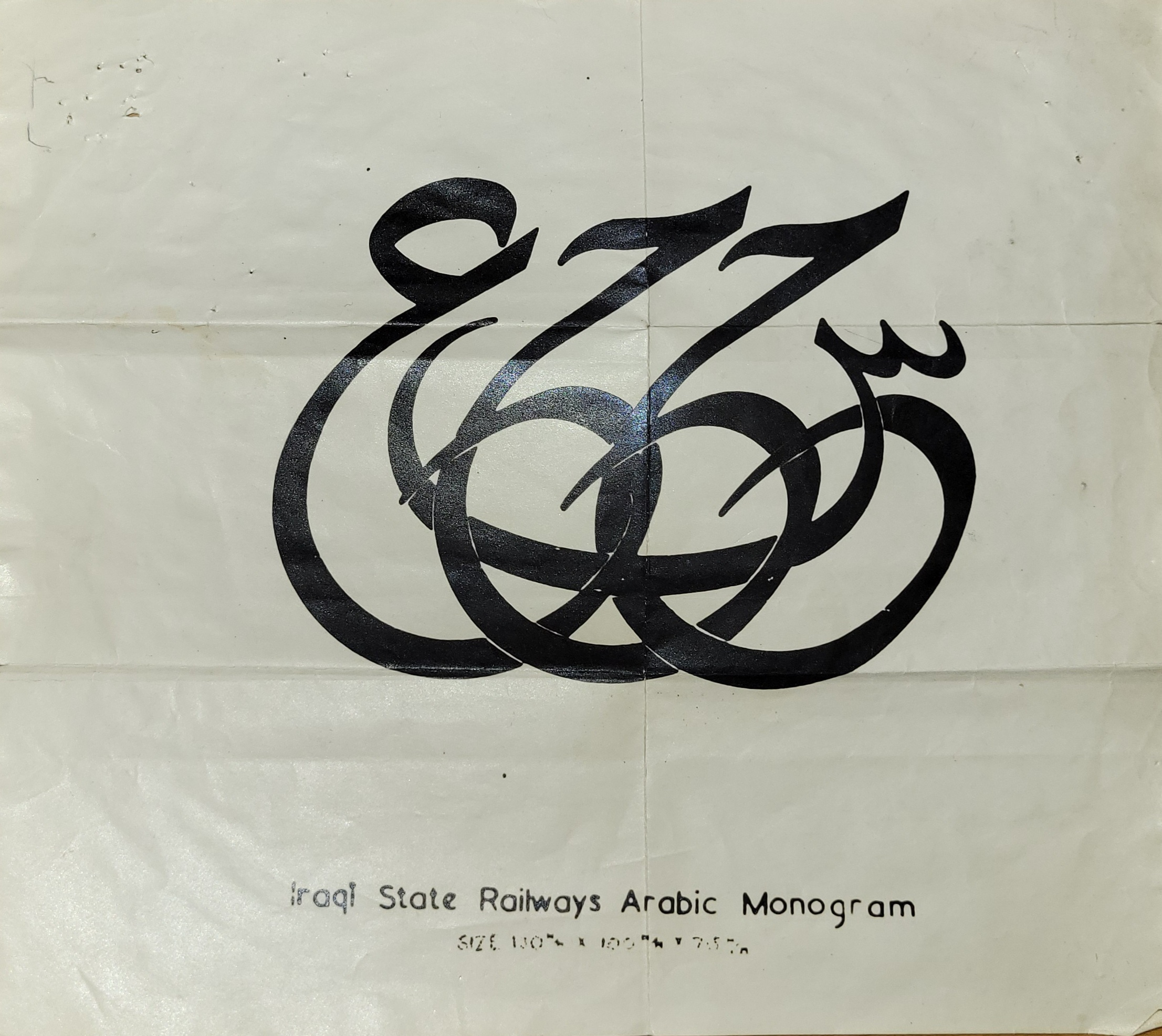
- Native name: الشركة العامة لسكك الحديد العراقية
- Company type: Government-owned corporation
- Industry: Rail transport
- Founded: 1905
- Headquarters: Baghdad, Iraq
- Products: Passenger Rail Transport
- Website: www.scr.gov.iq

Iraqi Republic Railways Company (IRR; Arabic: الشركة العامة لسكك الحديد العراقية, romanized: al-Sharikah al-‘Āmmah li-Sikkak al-Ḥadīd al-‘Irāqiyyah) is the state-owned operator of the railway system in Iraq. Iraqi Republic Railways is the owner of Iraq's railway network.

IRR handles all rail transport in Iraq, including passenger services and freight. It is headquartered in Baghdad, specifically at the Baghdad Central Station.

== History ==
The legal framework for the Iraqi Republic Railways (IRR) was established by the "Law of the Iraqi Republic Railways Establishment" (Law No. 33, 1965) and amended by Law No. 121 of 1970.

== See also ==
- Rail transport in Iraq
- Transport in Iraq
