= Hasakah Governorate campaign (2012–2014) =

Syrian military campaign

Hasakah Governorate campaign (2012–2013)
- Part of the 2012–2013 escalation of the Syrian Civil War, the Rojava conflict, and the Syrian Kurdish–Islamist conflict (2013–present)
- Location of the Hasakah Governorate
Date	20 July 2012 – 2 January 2014 (1 year, 5 months, 3 weeks and 4 days)
Location	Hasakah Governorate, Syria
Result	Inconclusive; YPG and ISIL gains: YPG captured all Kurdish-majority towns in the governorate with the exceptions of Qamishli and Hasaka, captured 40% of Qamishli, and took control of al-Yaarubiyah and its border crossing; ISIL, al-Nusra Front, and other Salafi jihadists take control over the majority of the southern Hasaka countryside

Belligerents
(Syria) Syrian Arab Republic; Syrian Arab Armed Forces; National Defense Forces; Sootoro	Al-Nusra Front; Free Syrian Army (Note: A number of FSA groups in ceasefire with YPG since February 2013, others continued fighting the YPG.); Islamic Front Islamic State of Iraq and Syria	(Democratic Autonomous Administration of North and East Syria) Kurdish Supreme Committee; People's Protection Units; Women's Protection Units; Syriac Union Party; Syriac Military Council; Sutoro; Army of Dignity; Kurdistan Workers' Party

Commanders and leaders
(Syria) Yusuf al-Abdullah (Abu Jabal Brigade commander) (Syria) Hawas Jammo (Free Patriots Brigade commander)	Abu Maria al-Qahtani; Fahd al-Gaad (al-Nusra commander) (Syrian opposition) Capt. Yusuf Yahya (SRGC 313th Brigade commander) (Syrian opposition) Col. Hassan al-Abdullah (FSA Hasaka Military Council top commander) (Syrian opposition) Nawaf Ragheb al-Bashir (FAEL commander) (Syrian opposition) Osama Hilali (Mashaal Tammo Brigade commander) (Syrian opposition) Lt. Col. Abdul Majid Sultan (Syrian opposition) Lt. Col. Mustafa Ibrahim (Note: Unlike most other FSA commanders listed above, Lt. Col. Mustafa Ibrahim had "good ties to a number of Kurdish militia units" in Hasaka and has fought alongside these units against al-Nusra.) (FSA Hasaka Military Council commander); Lt. Col. Hassan Aboud (FSA Hasaka Military Council commander) Abu Bakr al-Baghdadi; Saddam al-Jamal	(Democratic Autonomous Administration of North and East Syria) Sipan Hamo (YPG general commander) (Democratic Autonomous Administration of North and East Syria) Axin Nujin (YPJ Rukan Battalion commander) (Democratic Autonomous Administration of North and East Syria) Juan Ibrahim (YPG commander) "Dijwar" (Martyr Erdal Brigade commander) (Democratic Autonomous Administration of North and East Syria) Hawas al-Akub (Free Men of the Homeland commander); Humaydi Daham al-Hadi (Army of Dignity leader)

Units involved
- See order of battle

Casualties and losses
- At least 334 killed overall

The Hasakah Governorate campaign was a multi-sided military conflict between Syrian government forces, Kurdish forces, armed Syrian opposition groups, and Salafi jihadist forces, including al-Qaeda's al-Nusra Front and the Islamic State of Iraq and the Levant in the Hasakah Governorate as part of the Syrian civil war. The clashes began with the People's Protection Units (YPG)'s entrance into the civil war in July 2012 and spread across the governorate.

== Background ==
As of 2011, the Hasakah Governorate had a population of more than 1.5 million people. It is one of the most diverse regions in Syria. The diverse population of the governorate includes Kurds, Arabs, Assyrians, Armenians, Turkmen, Circassians, and Yazidis. The Arab tribes in the area are divided into several tribal confederations which play a role in the civil war.

Anti-government protests had been ongoing in the Kurdish-inhabited areas of Syria since March 2011, as part of the wider Syrian uprising, but armed conflict in the region only started after the opposition Democratic Union Party (PYD) and Kurdish National Council (KNC) signed a seven-point agreement on 11 June 2012 in Erbil under the auspice of Iraqi Kurdistan president Massoud Barzani. This agreement, however, failed to be implemented. A new cooperation agreement between the two sides was signed on 12 July which saw the creation of the Kurdish Supreme Committee as a governing body of all Kurdish-controlled territories in Syria.

== The campaign ==
=== First week: YPG claims territory ===
On 20 July 2012, the YPG took control of the city of Amuda and established checkpoints outside it. The city fell without any major clashes, as the Syrian Army withdrew without any significant resistance and pulled out to fight elsewhere. A joint committee between the PYD and the KNC was planned to take over the administration of captured towns. The city of Derik was expected to be captured hours later. The goal of the KSC was the "full liberation of Syrian Kurdistan", restore peace and order, and to prevent the Free Syrian Army (FSA) from entering Kurdish-majority areas.

On the same day, the Kurdish Coordination Committees, a Kurdish opposition group, demanded Syrian security forces to withdraw from Qamishli, the largest city in Syria with a majority Kurdish population. "Otherwise, they will be forced to leave", the KCC threatened. The YPG then prepared for an operation in Qamishli.

On 21 July, the YPG entered Derik and clashes took place. On the same day, Syrian government forces attacked a patrol of YPG fighters and wounded one fighter. The next day it was reported that Kurdish forces were still fighting for al-Malikiyah, where a Kurdish activist was killed after government security forces opened fire on protesters. The YPG also took control over parts of the towns of Ras al-Ayn (Kurdish: Serê Kaniyê) and al-Darbasiyah (Kurdish: Dirbêsî), after government security and political units withdrew from these areas, following an ultimatum issued by the Kurds. On the same day, clashes erupted in Qamishli between YPG and government forces in which one Kurdish fighter was killed and two were wounded along with a government official.

The ease with which Kurdish forces captured the towns and the government troops pulled back was speculated to be due to the government reaching an agreement with the Kurds so military forces from the area could be freed up to engage rebel forces in the rest of the country. However, Salih Muslim Muhammad, co-leader of the PYD, denied that there was any agreement between the PYD and the government. On 24 July, the PYD announced that Syrian security forces withdrew from the small Kurdish city of 16,000 of al-Ma'bada (Kurdish: Girkê Legê), located between al-Malikiyah and the Syria–Turkey border. The YPG forces afterwards took control of all government institutions in the town.

=== August–October 2012: YPG consolidates gains ===
On 2 August 2012, the National Coordination Committee for Democratic Change announced that most Kurdish-majority cities in Syria, with the exception of Qamishli and Hasaka, were no longer controlled by government forces and were now being governed by Kurdish political parties. In Qamishli, government military and police forces remained in their barracks and administration officials in the city allowed the Kurdish flag to be raised.

Later in August 2012, 6 military officers who defected from the Syrian Armed Forces, led by Colonel Hassan al-Abdullah, announced the formation of the "Revolutionary Military Council in Hasakah Governorate", part of the Free Syrian Army. On the same day, a FSA group called the "Believers in God Battalion" captured a police station on the road between Aleppo and Hasakah.

On 18 August, the government's intelligence center in Qamishli was bombed. The Hamza Battalion of the FSA claimed responsibility for the bombing. This caused concerns among Kurdish parties in Qamishli as they have refused to allow the FSA to enter Kurdish-majority areas.

On 30 September, a suicide bomber detonated a car bomb at the government intelligence center in Qamishli, killing between 4 and 8 people.

=== November 2012–January 2013: Islamists join the fight and the Battle of Ras al-Ayn ===
On 8 November 2012, Free Syrian Army groups attacked Syrian Army positions in Ras al-Ayn and took control of parts of the city. A correspondent on the ground said that local Kurds aided the FSA in the attack. 300 jihadist fighters from Ghuraba al-Sham then entered the city from the northern Turkish border, although they did not enter the neighbourhoods controlled by the YPG and the latter did not intervene in the clashes between the rebels and the government. Around 10-26 rebels and 20 Syrian soldiers were killed in the fighting, while about 8,000 residents fled to Ceylanpınar as fighting raged.

On 10 November, YPG militiamen aided by local Kurds stormed the last Syrian government security and administrative stations in the towns of al-Darbasiyah (Kurdish: Dirbêsî) and Tel Tamer. This attack was prompted by violence in Ras al-Ayn where the FSA and Islamist rebels stormed the town because of the presence of government security units. On 12 November, the YPG forced the last Syrian government forces to withdraw from Derik.

On 15 November, the rebels led by al-Qaeda's al-Nusra Front announced that they had taken full control of Ras al-Ayn, capturing or killing the last remaining Syrian Army soldiers stationed there. There were also no government airstrikes in the town for the first time in three days, as government forces gave up trying to retake the city. Al-Nusra Front fighters summarily executed dozens of Syrian soldiers after they captured a border outpost near Ras al-Ayn. Inside the town, al-Nusra Front implemented Sharia and burned a liquor store. This caused a confrontation with the YPG.

On 19 November, the Islamist rebels launched an assault on the YPG in Ras al-Ayn A rebel sniper also assassinated Abed Khalil, the president of the local PYD council. By the next, SOHR reported that the death toll in the rebel-PYD fighting in the town had reached 34. The opposition activist group Local Coordination Committees of Syria put the number of deaths at 46. Also on 19 November, members of al-Nusra Front and Ghuraba al-Sham opened fire on a YPG checkpoint, sparking clashes that killed dozens of people. The rebels planned to launch an offensive in Qamishli, but were stopped by the Assyrian Democratic Organization. Meanwhile, pro-government Arab tribes in Qamishli organized themselves into the Popular Committees and clashed with the PYD.

As a result of the fighting, there was a buildup in the number of forces deployed by both sides in Ras al-Ayn. By 22 November, Kurdish forces had strengthened their numbers to around 400 militiamen, who faced 200 fighters from al-Nusra Front and 100 fighters from Ghuraba al-Sham. By the same day, the fighting killed more than 54 people. The next day, however, a tenuous two-day ceasefire was announced between Kurdish fighters and al-Nusra Front and Ghuraba al-Sham in order to determine terms of a possible permanent agreement between the two sides. Prior to this announcement, the PYD claimed that its forces had killed 25 rebels.

Negotiations between the two sides on 4 December resulted in a fragile truce that lasted only until 6 December, when clashes broke out again. From 12 to 14 December, rebels conducted a series of rocket attacks on the town. The rebels began bombarding the Kurdish neighborhoods of Ras al-Ayn with artillery and mortar strikes. It was reported that they had also tried and failed to expand fighting to the nearby towns and villages.

Negotiations between the Arab rebels and Kurds resumed on 15 December. An agreement was reached the next day. On 17 December, a ceasefire came into effect between local Kurdish militias and Arab rebels. Under the terms of the ceasefire, both sides were to withdraw from the city, share checkpoints surrounding it, and transfer its administration to local civilian Kurds, Arabs, Chechens, and Christians. Though fighting ended, fighters on both sides failed to withdraw, raising concerns about the strength of the truce.

Fighting in Ras al-Ayn resumed on 17 January 2013. By 22 January, more than 56 people were killed in a week of fighting in Ras al-Ayn.

=== February 2013: al-Qaeda launches new offensive, ceasefire between YPG and FSA ===
Rebel offensives in southern Hasakah from February to March 2013

On 12 February 2013, al-Nusra Front launched an offensive on the Syrian Army in the town of al-Shaddadah in the southern Hasaka Governorate. 2 days later, al-Nusra Front took full control of the town and killed around 100 Syrian soldiers.

On 18 February, an agreement was reached between the Kurdish Supreme Committee and FSA groups in Ras al-Ayn. The terms of agreement include the withdrawal of all foreign fighters from Ras al-Ayn, joint checkpoints between the YPG and the FSA, the establishment of a joint city council in Ras al-Ayn, the creation of a local police force, and cooperation between the two groups to fight the Syrian government.

=== March 2013: YPG take control of oil fields ===
Situation in Qamishli, mid-March 2013

Situation in Hasakah, mid-March 2013

In March 2013, the YPG surrounded Syrian forces in Rmelan and al-Qahtaniya and took control of the towns without firing a shot. The YPG also took over the oil fields in the area. Meanwhile, further south, multiple rebel groups including Ahrar al-Jazeera, al-Nusra Front, Ghuraba al-Sham, and Ahrar al-Sham captured the town of al-Yaarubiyah on the Iraq–Syria border. In Qamishli, the PYD controlled 40% of the city while the government controlled the remaining parts. Meanwhile, clashes between rebels and the Syrian Army erupted in Tell Hamis.

=== April 2013: renewed YPG-government clashes in Qamishli, concurrent rebel offensive ===
On 5 April 2013, 3 YPG fighters and 3 Syrian soldiers were killed in clashes in Qamishli city. This marked the first time that Syrian government forces attacked the YPG in Qamishli for several months.

On 13 April, the Syrian Revolution General Commission's 313th Brigade declared the start of a rebel offensive south of Qamishli. The rebels launched an attack on the Syrian Army's 154th Brigade base in southern Qamishli. Both the PYD and the KNC stated their intentions to prevent fighting in the city, but according to al-Akhbar, the rebels contacted the YPG and were given a pathway to attack the base. In response to the rebel offensive, the Syrian Air Force conducted airstrikes on rebel-held villages south of Qamishli. Fighting also reached Qamishli Airport. The battle was described as a "massacre" by UNICEF.

=== May–September 2013: YPG fully capture Ras al-Ayn; further YPG gains ===
In June 2013, clashes between the PYD and anti-PYD protesters took place in Amuda. Opponents of the PYD stated that fighters had opened fire on protesters following tensions with pro-Free Syrian Army youth committees and rival Kurdish groups. The PYD on the other hand stated it had been attacked by a mercenary gang.

On 17 July, Kurdish fighters expelled the remaining jihadists of al-Nusra Front and the Islamic State of Iraq and the Levant from Ras al-Ayn after a night of fighting and soon after took control of the border crossing with Turkey. Islamist forces retreated from Ras al-Ayn to Tal Half, Asfar and Najar, which were under rebel control.

On 19 July, the YPG captured the village of Tal A'lo. Fighting was still continuing in Karhouk and A'li Agha. The next day, Kurdish fighters captured an al-Nusra Front checkpoint near the contested villages. By this point, 35 jihadists and 19 YPG fighters had been killed in the fighting.

At the end of August 2013, the Syrian Air Force conducted an airstrike on the PYD-held town of Derik.

=== October–December 2013: YPG capture border town; ISIL offensives ===
In October 2013, Ahrar al-Jazeera was expelled from the border town of al-Yaarubiyah by al-Nusra Front, the Islamic State of Iraq and the Levant, and other Salafi jihadist groups. At the end of the month, YPG forces supported by local Arab tribes and Iraq captured Yarubiya from the jihadists after a 4-day battle.

From October to December 2013, ISIL conducted a campaign of suicide bombings on both YPG and Syrian government's National Defence Forces in Qamishli. Meanwhile, fighting between the YPG and ISIL, supported by al-Nusra Front and Ahrar al-Sham, escalated in the countryside of Qamishli.

=== December 2013-January 2014: YPG offensive; Jihadist counteroffensive ===
In December 2013, the YPG and YPJ launched an offensive to break rebel control of the towns of Tell Hamis and Tell Brak. Tell Brak, as well as significant territory around Tell Hamis was briefly captured by Kurdish forces by January 5 of the next year, however all gains made were reversed in 2 days by a major jihadist counterattack.

== Order of battle ==
=== Pro-Kurdish Supreme Committee (DBK) forces ===
- Democratic Union Party
  - People's Protection Units (YPG)
    - Martyr Erdal Brigade
    - Free Men of the Homeland
  - Women's Protection Units
    - Rukan Battalion
- Kurdistan Workers' Party (PKK)
- Syriac Union Party
  - Syriac Military Council
  - Sutoro
- Army of Dignity

=== Pro-government forces ===
- Syrian Armed Forces
  - Syrian Army
    - 4th Armoured Division
      - 154th Brigade
  - Syrian Air Force
- National Defence Forces
  - Ta'ie tribal militia
  - Abu Jabal Brigade
  - Free Patriots Brigade
- Sootoro

=== Rebel groups ===
- (Syrian opposition) Free Syrian Army
  - (Syrian opposition) Revolutionary Military Council of Hasaka
    - (Syrian opposition) Ahfad al-Rasul Brigades
    - Liwa al-Nasser
  - (Syrian opposition) Farouq Brigades
  - (Syrian opposition) Hamza Battalion
  - Ahrar al-Jazeera
  - Conquest Brigade
  - Azadî Battalion
  - Mashaal Tammo Brigade (Note: Kurdish FSA group which fought alongside al-Nusra against the YPG.)
  - Ummah Brigade
  - 313th Brigade
  - 15th Infantry Division
  - Al-Jazeera–Euphrates Liberation Front (FAEL)
  - Ayad al-Fahri Battalion
- Islamic Front
  - Ahrar al-Sham
  - Kurdish Islamic Front
  - (Syrian opposition) Al-Tawhid Brigade
- Liwa Amjad al-Islam
- Liwa al-Qadisiyah
- Jaysh al-Tawhid (ex-Syrian Islamic Front group)

Jihadist groups

- Al-Qaeda
  - Al-Nusra Front
  - Ansar al-Khilafah
  - Ghuraba al-Sham
- Islamic State of Iraq and the Levant

== See also ==
- Raqqa campaign (2012–2013)
