= Battle of al-Yaarubiyah =

Fought in late October 2013 at al-Yaarubiyah

- Part of the al-Hasakah Governorate campaign (2012–13), the Syrian Kurdish–Islamist conflict (2013–present) and the inter-rebel conflict during the Syrian Civil War
- Map of the battle
Date	23–27 October 2013 (4 days)
Location	Al-Yaarubiyah, al-Malikiyah District, al-Hasakah Governorate, Syria 36.811667°N 42.066389°E
Result	Pro-PYD forces victory
Territorial changes	The YPG captures al-Yaarubiyah and its countryside.

Belligerents
Kurdish Supreme Committee; Democratic Union Party (PYD); YPG; YPJ; Shammar tribe; Non-combat support: Local Arab tribes; Iraq	Free Syrian Army; Ahrar al-Sham; Kurdish Islamic Front; Salah al-Din Brigade; Ansar al-Khilafa; Liwa al-Tawhid wal-Jihad; Tawhid and Punishment Battalions and Brigades; Al-Nusra Front; Islamic State of Iraq and the Levant

Commanders and leaders
Unknown	Abdul Hafez al-Jaryan (surrendered) (Liwa al-Tawhid wal-Jihad commander)

Units involved
	Free Syrian Army; Azadî Battalion

Casualties and losses
3 killed, many wounded (YPG claim)	6 killed (24 and 26 Oct., per SOHR); Heavy (overall casualties per local reports); 5 tanks captured
- Location within Syria

The Battle of al-Yaarubiyah was fought in late October 2013 at al-Yaarubiyah, a strategically important town at the border of Syria with Iraq. Affiliates of the Democratic Union Party (PYD), namely the YPG/YPJ and local Arab tribes, attacked the settlement in an attempt to capture it from Jihadist and Islamist groups, led by the Al-Nusra Front and the Islamic State of Iraq and the Levant. After four days of heavy fighting, the Islamists were defeated and expelled from al-Yaarubiyah.

== Background ==
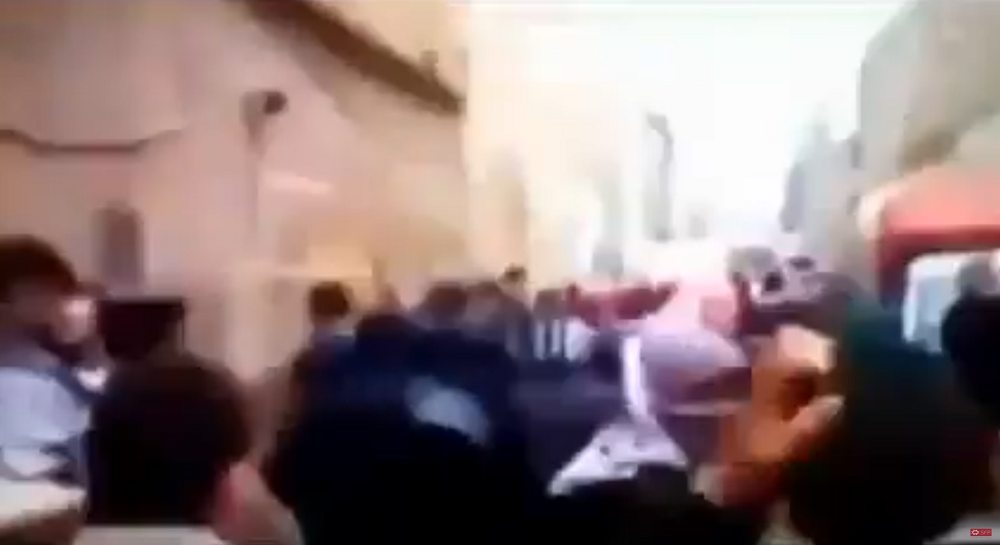
Anti-government protests in al-Yaarubiyah in January 2012

The Syrian Civil War reached al-Yaarubiyah in early 2013, when a group of locals formed Ahrar al-Jazeera and started an uprising against the government. These local rebels were not very successful until they were reinforced by the al-Nusra Front, Ahrar al-Sham, and Ghuraba al-Sham, who captured al-Yaarubiyah in March 2013. Soon thereafter the insurgents began to fight each other over control of the town. The rebels in al-Yaarubiyah only banded together again in July, as the conflict between Islamists and pro-PYD factions in the al-Hasakah Governorate escalated. From then on, Islamist forces used the town as important staging point for attacks against YPG-held areas. The YPG launched a general counter-offensive, code-named "Martyr Çekjin Efrin Revolutionary Operation", in early September, in course of which it captured several villages near al-Yaarubiyah.

As the rebels in al-Yaarubiyah were forced on the defensive, Ahrar al-Jazeera fell out of favor with the other rebel groups, and was forcibly expelled from the town on charges that it was corrupt. As result, al-Yaarubiyah was left under the control of four Jihadi groups by October 2013: The al-Nusra Front, the Islamic State of Iraq and the Levant, (Note: The relationship between ISIL and the al-Nusra Front in al-Yaarubiyah at the time was unclear, and it is possible that the two groups effectively operated as one in the town.) Ansar al-Khilafa, (Note: This "Ansar al-Khilafa" was a unit of locals from al-Yaarubiyah who were loyal to ISIL. It should not be confused with Ansar al-Khilafah, an Aleppo-based rebel group that also fought in al-Hasakah Governorate during this time.) and Liwa al-Tawhid wal-Jihad. Both Ansar al-Khilafa and Liwa al-Tawhid wal-Jihad consisted of local Islamists, though they were much weaker than ISIL/al-Nusra. In addition, Sky News Arabia reported that some Ahrar al-Sham fighters operated in the town. The Jihadist rule of al-Yaarubiyah was harsh, as locals were forbidden from listening to music and forced to fast and pray, while dissidents were either imprisoned or beheaded. Food prices increased and fuel became scarce. In response to these policies and the fighting in the area, most of the town's population fled to YPG territories. Eventually, a delegation of 90 leading tribesmen from al-Yaarubiyah asked the YPG to drive the rebels from the town, to which the militia responded positively.

== Battle ==
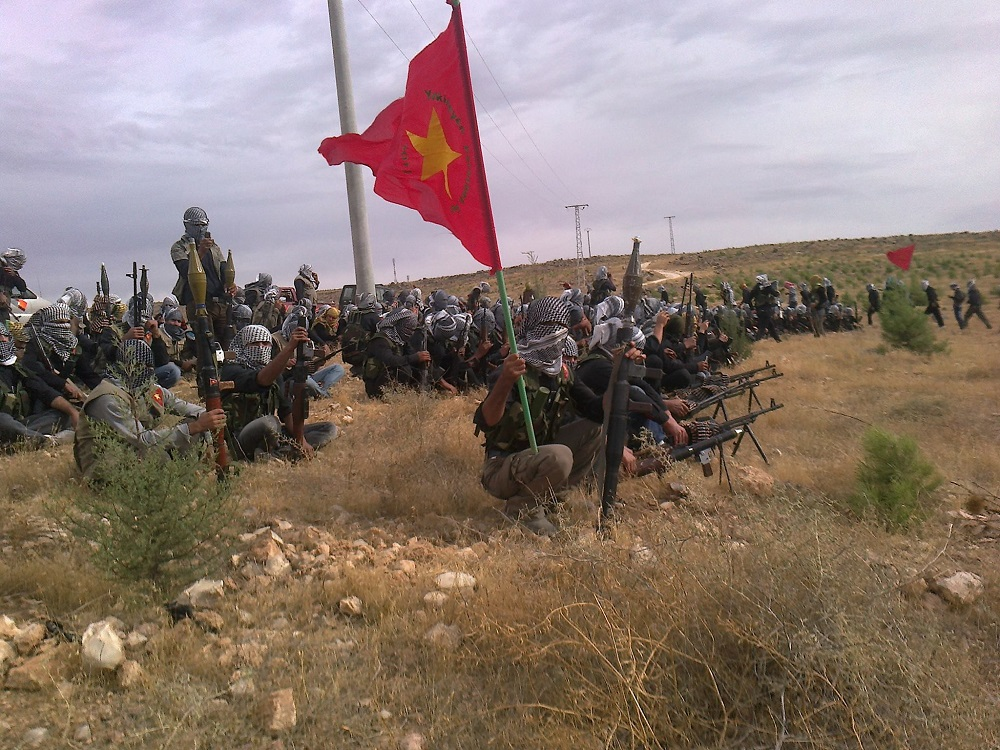
YPG fighters in 2013

The YPG and YPJ launched the offensive to conquer al-Yaarubiyah on 23 October, beginning with the "Tırbespiyê" and "Til Elo Martyrs" operations, which aimed at securing the countryside around the town. By the next day, the Kurds and forces of the Shammar tribe, which were supported by local guides, had captured four villages and three hamlets surrounding al-Yaarubiyah.

In the night of 25 October, the Kurdish militias finally began their three-pronged assault on the town's outskirts, first seizing two strategic villages. The local cement plant, which had served as rebel headquarters, was captured by YPG/YPJ forces during a second assault in the early hours of the next day, while the town's border crossing and another village fell to the Kurdish units around dawn. The YPG and YPJ then began their attack on al-Yaarubiyah itself, and in course of two days drove the Islamists from the town. The last pockets of resistance consisting of ISIL, al-Nusra Front, and Ahrar al-Sham holdouts were cleared out on 27 October. The YPG subsequently claimed that they had inflicted heavy casualties on the Islamists and captured five tanks, as well as large amounts of weapons and ammunition.

After the town's fall, the Syrian rebels as well as the National Iraqi Alliance accused the Iraqi Army of having directly intervened in the battle on the side of the YPG/YPJ. There were also claims about strikes on the town by the Iraqi Air Force. Iraqi authorities strongly denied that any intervention had taken place, with expert Aymenn Jawad Al-Tamimi saying that there was "no evidence of active Iraqi military aid to the YPG". Instead, the Iraqi Army had simply reinforced their side of the border during the battle in an attempt to prevent ISIL fighters from retreating into Nineveh Governorate. Iraqi officials admitted, however, that wounded YPG fighters had received medical aid from the Iraqi Army.

== Aftermath and reactions ==
The capture of al-Yaarubiyah was hailed as great success by the PYD, but was also welcomed by the Kurdish National Council, a local political opponent of the PYD. Similarly, Syrian pro-government media reported the defeat of the Islamist rebel forces at al-Yaarubiyah with satisfaction. The Syrian National Coalition, however, another Syrian opposition group and rival of the PYD, condemned the YPG for expelling the "Free Syrian Army" from the town, even though no FSA forces had been present during the battle. In contrast, the Ahrar al-Jazeera Brigade took an intermediate stance, and officially denounced the purported Iraqi invasion of al-Yaarubiyah, while at the same time trying to negotiate a power-sharing deal with the YPG.

Meanwhile, the YPG continued to advance in the countryside around al-Yaarubiyah and al-Jawadiyah, and between 28 and 29 October managed to encircle the elements of Liwa al-Tawhid wal-Jihad that had survived the battle at the town. As a result, much of the militia surrendered with their weapons and equipment, including its commander Abdul Hafez al-Jaryan, even though it had declared shortly before that it would fight together with ISIL against the YPG until the very end. Some Liwa al-Tawhid wal-Jihad fighters remained active, however, and joined a counter-attack by the al-Nusra Front, ISIL, and Ansar al-Khilafa in early November, which aimed at retaking al-Yaarubiyah. Although the Jihadists, supported by Ahrar al-Sham, managed to advance into the town's outskirts, the attack ultimately failed. In the following weeks al-Yaarubiyah was rebuilt, and on 22 November 2013 many of its civilian residents returned. Opposition activists claimed, however, that thousands of other local Arabs had fled from the region rather than stay under PYD rule.

For his role in handing over weapons to the YPG after surrendering, the Liwa al-Tawhid wal-Jihad commander al-Jaryan was later killed by ISIL in early January 2014 near the town of Tell Hamis, which saw a successful ISIL counter-offensive against the YPG at the beginning of that month.
