= Battle of Tell Hamis and Tell Brak (2013–2014) =

Syrian Civil War battle

- Part of the al-Hasakah Governorate campaign (2012–13) of the Syrian Kurdish–Islamist conflict (2013–present)
- Map of the battle
Date	26 December 2013–7 January 2014 (1 week and 5 days)
Location	Tell Hamis Subdistrict, Qamishli District and Bir al-Helou al-Wardiya Subdistrict, al-Hasakah District, al-Hasakah Governorate, northeast Syria 36.7586°N 41.3989°E
Result	ISIL victory

Belligerents
Movement for a Democratic Society (TEV-DEM); Democratic Union Party (PYD); People's Protection Units (YPG); Women's Protection Units (YPJ); Syriac Union Party; Syriac Military Council (MFS)	Islamic State of Iraq and the Levant Al-Nusra Front; Islamic Front: Ahrar al-Sham; Jaysh al-Islam; Free Syrian Army: 313th Brigade

Commanders and leaders
Sipan Hemo (YPG general commander); Hasan Cudi; Unidentified Arab leaders (executed)	

Casualties and losses
54 killed 150 killed (per The Arab Chronicle) 35 captured, all executed	21 killed (per SOHR) 80+ IF and FSA fighters and 20+ foreign ISIL fighters killed (per The Arab Chronicle)
- Several civilians killed
- Location of Tell Hamis within Syria

The Battle of Tell Hamis and Tell Brak was fought between the end of December 2013 and the start of January 2014 over control of the town of Tell Hamis and the village of Tell Brak in al-Hasakah Governorate of northeast Syria during the Syrian Civil War. The armed wings of the Democratic Union Party (PYD), namely the People's and Women's Protection Units (YPG and YPJ), in addition to the Syriac Union Party's Syriac Military Council (MFS), attempted to capture the areas from Salafi jihadists led by the Islamic State of Iraq and the Levant, the Al-Nusra Front, and the Islamic Front's Ahrar al-Sham, but were repelled in a counter-offensive by the jihadists.

== Background ==
As part of the rebel campaign to gain a foothold in the Hasakah Governorate which began in 2012, al-Qaeda-affiliated al-Nusra Front captured Tell Hamis on 25 February 2013 after several days of fighting with the Syrian Armed Forces. Shelling by the government forces during the battle led to the displacement of most of the town's residents. Amid fears of clashes between al-Nusra and the YPG, Kurds set up barriers in villages north of Tel Hamis to prevent the entry of government and rebel forces.

A dispute later broke out between Ahrar al-Sham and the Free Syrian Army-affiliated 313th Brigade over the right to distribute wheat in Tell Hamis, leading Ahrar al-Sham to seize grain silos in the town by force.

Open conflict between the YPG and Salafist jihadists of ISIL, al-Nusra, and Ahrar al-Sham erupted in July 2013 which led to the YPG taking complete control of Ras al-Ayn on the Syria–Turkey border after expelling the jihadists on 17 July. The YPG went on the offensive in the governorate and with the assistance of Shammar tribesmen, captured the strategically important town of al-Yaarubiyah at the Iraq–Syria border in late October as the jihadists retreated to Tell Hamis and Tell Brak.

On 23 December, the YPG announced the formation of a battalion made of Arab volunteers from the Tell Hamis area, as displaced people from the area complained of harassment by jihadists.

== Battle ==
On the night of 26/27 December 2013, the YPG, gathered in al-Yaarubiyah, launched the offensive on Tell Hamis and Tell Brak with several hundred fighters on technicals and improvised armoured vehicles. On the first day they captured villages to the east and south of Tell Brak and north, east, and west of Tell Hamis. Tell Brak itself was also reported captured by 27 December. However, French observer Cedric Labrousse disputed this and claimed the YPG only took full control of Tell Brak village on 2 January 2014.

By 8 December the YPG had moved into Tell Hamis. A media blackout was imposed by the YPG during the battle, as fighting intensified on 3 January as ISIL and the Islamic Front launched a counter-attack and pushed the YPG out of Tell Hamis town on 5 January. The jihadists then attacked the YPG and MFS forces in Tell Brak and drove them out on 7 January, when the YPG withdrew and announced an end to the operation.

39 YPG fighters who were killed during the battle were buried in Qamishli on 15 January 2014, while the bodies of 15 Kurdish and Arab YPG fighters and collaborators killed remained under jihadist control. The Syrian Observatory for Human Rights reported 21 jihadists killed. Labrousse on the other hand claimed more than 150 YPG fighters were killed, along with more than 80 fighters of the Islamic Front and FSA groups and 20 ISIL foreign fighters. The jihadists captured two YPG vehicles and took 35 YPG fighters prisoner, all of whom they executed by beheading.

== Analysis and aftermath ==
Map of the subsequent YPG offensive on Tell Brak in February 2014 and the ISIL counter-offensive in June 2014

Unlike in al-Yaarubiyah where the YPG received support from local Arab Shammar tribesmen who sent a delegation to request the YPG move into the town, the largest tribe in Tell Hamis, the Sharabia, are long-time rivals of the Shammar and did not support the YPG, contributing to the failure of the offensive. In Tell Brak, the success of the jihadist counterattack was attributed to jihadists disguised as returning villagers targeting the YPG from the rear, while the jihadists claimed that in Tell Brak, some of the Arab YPG fighters they captured switched sides after their commanders were executed in front of them by ISIL and Ahrar al-Sham.

On 20 January, YPG general commander Sipan Hemo accused "perfidious collaborating Kurdish forces" of aiding the jihadists in Tell Hamis and Tell Brak, and vowed revenge for the killed YPG fighters.

Following the battle, ISIL's Hasakah branch and four other groups in the area including the Islamic Front formed a joint operations room against the YPG, and all FSA groups in Tell Hamis pledged allegiance to ISIL. While ISIL and Ahrar al-Sham maintained good relations in the Hasakah Governorate in spite of clashes in the rest of Syria, ISIL attacks on Ahrar al-Sham bases in the governorate on 6 February 2014 and ISIL's declarations of the Islamic Front as apostates led to the end of their alliance and the joint operations room amidst the wider opposition–ISIL conflict.

On 22 February 2014, the YPG captured Tell Brak in another offensive, before ISIL recaptured it in another counter-offensive in June. The YPG, MFS, and other forces finally recaptured both Tell Hamis and Tell Brak in the eastern al-Hasakah offensive in late February 2015.

== Reactions ==
The Istanbul-based National Coalition of Syrian Revolutionary and Opposition Forces on 3 January 2014 condemned the YPG offensive on Tell Hamis and paid "tribute to the heroes defending the town".
