= Battle of Shaddadi (2013) =

Military operation of the Syrian civil war

Coordinates: 36.0561°N 40.7303°E

- Part of the al-Hasakah Governorate campaign (2012–13) (Syrian civil war)
- Map of the frontline changes from 12 February 2013 – 15 March 2013
Date	12–14 February 2013 (2 days)
Location	Al-Shaddadah, Syria
Result	Al-Nusra Front victory

Belligerents
Al-Nusra Front	(Syria) Syrian Arab Republic; Syrian Arab Army

Commanders and leaders
Fahd al-Gaad; Unknown top provincial commander †	Taysir Kiwani

Strength
2,000 fighters	250 soldiers

Casualties and losses
40 killed	100 killed

The Battle of Shaddadi was a three-day-long battle fought between government forces loyal to Syrian President Bashar al-Assad and Islamist Al-Nusra Front fighters in the city of Shadadeh, located near the Iraqi border.

== Battle ==
On 12 February, as part of a large rebel offensive against Shadadeh, two suicide bombers from Al-Nusra Front detonated car bombs around the city, the explosions targeted the military and state security branches of the city. Around 14 soldiers were killed as a result of the explosions. Later that day, 1 al-Nusra fighter was killed in clashes with government forces.

On 13 February, violent clashes were reported to have taken place in Shadadeh between rebels and government forces. Over the past 48 hours, al-Nusra fighters managed to take large parts of the city, at least 60%. During one of the Islamist assaults, tens of petroleum workers were killed when al-Nusra fighters attacked residential areas of the city, including an oil refinery. The clashes had left 16 al-Nusra fighters and a number of soldiers dead by this point. There were reports of military reinforcements and army tanks arriving, via al-Hasakah city. There were no signs of any Free Syrian Army or other rebel presence reported in the city.

On 14 February, Islamists claimed to have taken over Shadadeh after three days of fighting government forces. Violent clashes were said to have continued to take place with government checkpoints on the outskirts of the city. The Syrian Observatory for Human Rights (SOHR) stated that the final death toll was 40 al-Nusra fighters, five of them non-Syrian (Kuwaiti and Iraqi), and no less than 100 members of the regular army and security services killed.

On the night of 15 February, government forces killed a key commander of al-Nusra Front when they attacked his safehouse in Shadadeh, losing seven of their own men in the process.

On 17 February, footage was sent to the SOHR of the aftermath of the execution of five people by al-Nusra Front in Shadadeh.
