= People's Defense Units =

Mainly-Kurdish militia in Syria

- Yekîneyên Parastina Gel
- Flag of the YPG
- Active: 2011–2026
- Allegiance: Kurdish Supreme Committee (2011–2013); Autonomous Administration of North and East Syria (2013–2026); Democratic Union Party (2012–2026)
- Type: Paramilitary; Light infantry Motorized infantry
- Size: 76,000 (2017 estimate); 35,000-50,000 (2025 Turkish estimate)
- Part of: Syrian Democratic Forces
- Engagements: Kurdistan Workers' Party insurgency; Syrian Civil War; Rojava conflict; 2012 Rojava campaign; Rojava–Islamist conflict; Battle of Aleppo; Northern Aleppo offensive (February 2016); Al-Hasaka campaign (2012–13); Battle of Ras al-Ayn; Battle of Tell Abyad (2013); Battle of al-Yaarubiyah; Battle of Tell Hamis and Tell Brak (2013–2014); Siege of Kobanî; US intervention in the Syrian civil war; Al-Hasakah offensive; Battle of Sarrin; Tell Abyad offensive; Battle of Al-Hasakah; Al-Hawl offensive; Tishrin Dam offensive; Al-Shaddadi offensive; Battle of Tell Abyad (2016); Northern Raqqa offensive; Manbij offensive (2016); Battle of al-Hasakah (2016); Operation Euphrates Shield; Western al-Bab offensive (October–November 2016); Raqqa campaign (2016–2017); Operation Olive Branch; Eastern Syria Insurgency; Deir ez-Zor campaign (2017–2019); 2019 Turkish offensive into north-eastern Syria; 2024 Syrian opposition offensives; Battle of Aleppo (2024); Operation Dawn of Freedom; Deir ez-Zor offensive (2024); Turkish offensive into northeastern Syria (2024–2025); East Aleppo offensive (2024–2025); War in Iraq (2013–2017); 2014 Sinjar offensive; 2015 Sinjar offensive
- Website: Official website

Commanders
- General Commander: Sipan Hamo (until 2026)
- Spokesperson: Nuri Mahmoud
- Notable commanders: Zainab Afrin; Nalîn Dêrik; Sozdar Dêrik; Serhildan Garisî; Rêdûr Khalil

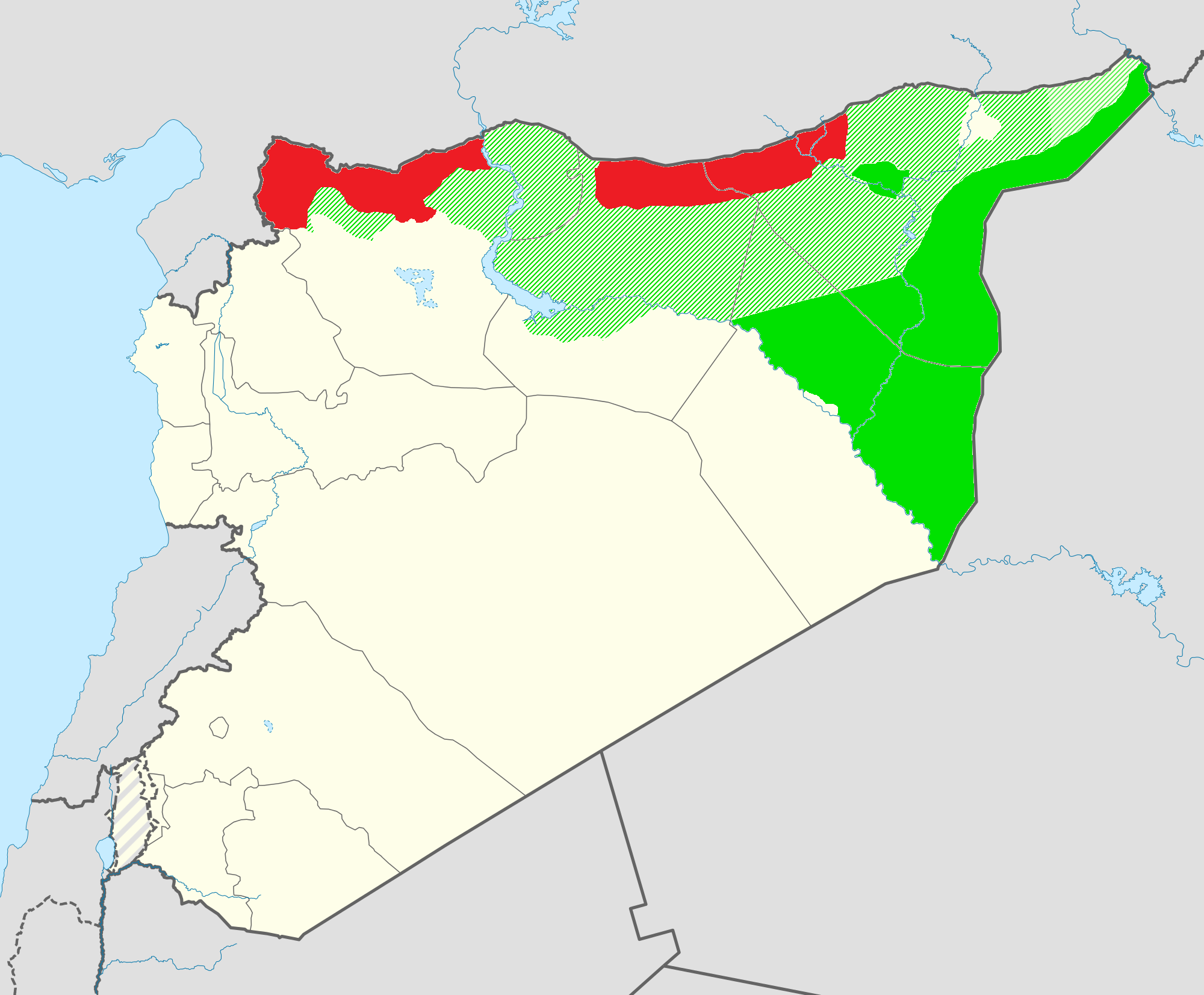
Before the end of 2024, territory under YPG-led SDF-controlled (green), and Turkish occupation of northern Syria (red)

The People's Defense Units, (Kurmanji Kurdish: Yekîneyên Parastina Gel) abbreviated as YPG, (Note: Kurdish: یەکینەیێن پاراستنا گەل, romanized: Yekîneyên Parastina Gel (YPG) pronounced [jɛkiːnɛjeːn pɑːɾɑːstɯnɑː ɡɛl]; Arabic: وحدات حماية الشعب, romanized: Waḥdāt Ḥimāyat aš-Šaʽb) also called People's Protection Units, was a libertarian socialist, Kurdish militant group in Syria and the primary component of the Syrian Democratic Forces (SDF).

The YPG mostly consisted of Kurds, but also includes Arabs and foreign volunteers; it was closely allied to the Syriac Military Council, an Assyrian militia. Formed in 2011, it expanded rapidly in the Syrian Civil War and came to predominate over other armed Syrian Kurdish groups. A sister militia, the Women's Protection Units (YPJ), fought alongside them. The YPG was active in the Autonomous Administration of North and East Syria (Rojava), particularly in its Kurdish regions.

In early 2015, the group won a major victory over the Islamic State (IS) during the siege of Kobanî, where the YPG began to receive air and ground support from the United States and other Combined Joint Task Force – Operation Inherent Resolve militaries. Since then, the YPG primarily fought against IS, as well as on occasion fighting other Syrian rebel groups and the Turkish Armed Forces. In late 2015, the YPG became part of the SDF, an umbrella group intended to better incorporate Arabs and minorities into the war effort. In 2016–2017, the SDF's Raqqa campaign led to the liberation of the city of Raqqa, the Islamic State's de facto capital. Several western sources have described the YPG as the "most effective" force in fighting IS in Syria.

According to Turkey and Qatar, the YPG is a terrorist organization due to its association with the Kurdistan Workers' Party (PKK), which is listed as a terrorist organization. The flag of the YPG is also a banned symbol in Germany as per Strafgesetzbuch section 86a, although the organization itself is not recognised as terrorist. The Turkish terror classification is not shared by key international bodies in the fight against the Islamic State in which the YPG takes part. Due to this Turkish view, US Army Special Operations Commander General Raymond Thomas suggested the YPG to change their name, after which the name of the Syrian Democratic Forces (SDF) was founded.

== History ==
=== Early origins ===
Kurdish activists attempted to unify themselves following the 2004 Qamishli riots. The riots began as clashes between rival football fans before taking a political turn, with Arab fans raising pictures of Saddam Hussein while the Kurdish fans reportedly proclaimed, "We will sacrifice our lives for Bush". This resulted in clashes between the two groups who attacked each other with sticks, stones and knives. Government security forces entered the city to quell the riot, firing at the crowds. The riots resulted in around 36 dead, most of them Kurds.

They did not, however, emerge as a significant force until the Syrian civil war erupted in 2011.

==== Establishment ====
The self-defence committees that were to become the YPG were formed in July and August 2011 as the Self Protection units (YXG).

Existing underground Kurdish political parties, the Democratic Union Party (PYD) and the Kurdish National Council (KNC), joined to form the Kurdish Supreme Committee (KSC) and established the People's Protection Units (YPG) militia to defend Kurdish-inhabited areas in northern Syria, i.e. Syrian Kurdistan and the Kurdish enclave of Sheikh Maqsood in Aleppo. Originally a wholly Kurdish force, the YPG began to recruit Arabs from at least 2012.

=== Control of Kurdish areas ===
In July 2012, the YPG had a standoff with Syrian government forces in the Kurdish city of Kobanî and the surrounding areas. After negotiations, government forces withdrew and the YPG took control of Kobanî, Amuda, and Afrin.

By December 2012, it had expanded to eight brigades, which were formed in Qamishlo, Kobanî, and Ras al-Ayn (Serê Kaniyê), and in the districts of Afrin, al-Malikiyah, and al-Bab.

==== Late 2012: Islamist attacks make YPG dominant ====
The YPG did not initially take an offensive posture in the Syrian Civil War. Aiming mostly to defend Kurdish-majority areas, it avoided engaging Syrian government forces, which still controlled several enclaves in Kurdish territory. The YPG changed this policy when Ras al-Ayn was taken by the al-Qaeda-affiliated al-Nusra Front. At first the YPG conquered the surrounding government-controlled areas: al-Darbasiyah (Kurdish: Dirbêsî), Tel Tamer and al-Malikiyah (Kurdish: Dêrika Hemko). The subsequent Battle of Ras al-Ayn started in earnest when on 19 November 2012, the al-Nusra Front and a second al-Qaeda affiliate, Ghuraba al-Sham, attacked Kurdish positions in the town. The battle ended with a YPG victory in July 2013.

While many rebel groups clashed with the YPG, jihadist and Salafist groups did so the most often. The YPG proved to be the only Kurdish militia able to effectively resist the fundamentalists. While the YPG protected the Kurdish communities it was able to extract a price: it prevented the emergence of new, rival militias and forced existing ones to cooperate with or join the YPG forces on its terms. This was how the Islamist attacks enabled the YPG to unite the Syrian Kurds under its banner and caused it to become the de facto army of the Syrian Kurds.

==== 2013: Kurdish control of al-Yaarubiyah/Til Koçer ====
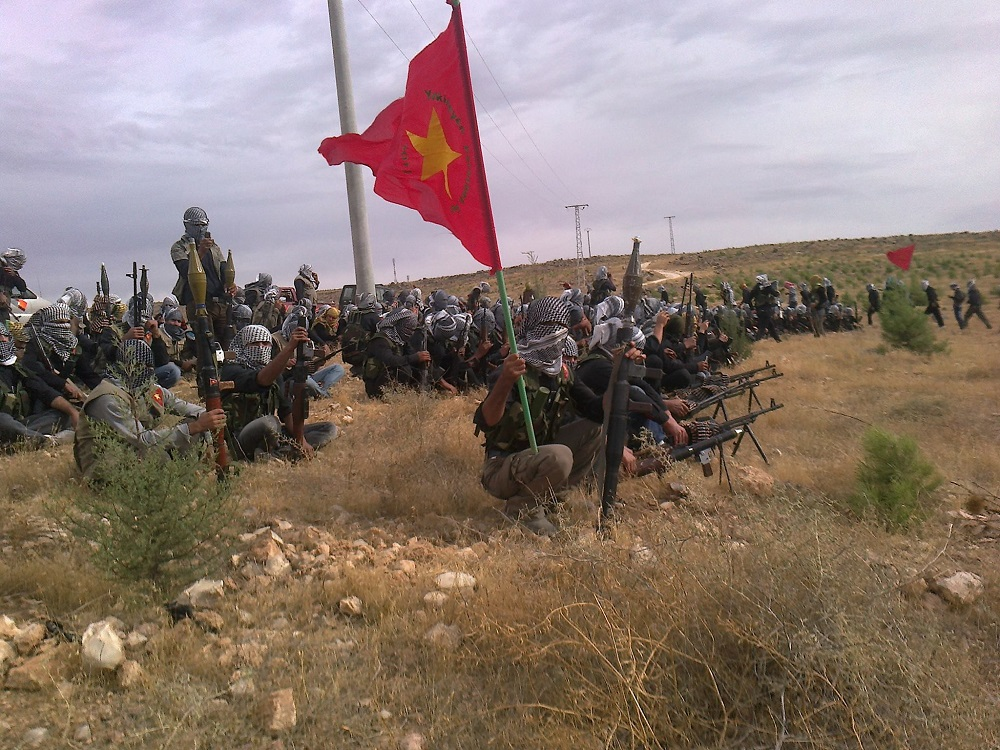
YPG fighters in 2013

In October 2013, YPG fighters took control of al-Yaarubiyah (Til Koçer) following intense clashes with IS. The clashes lasted about three days, with the Til Koçer border gate to Iraq being taken in a major offensive launched on the night of 24 October. PYD leader Salih Muslim told Stêrk TV that this success created an alternative against efforts to hold the territory under embargo, referring to the fact that the other border crossings with Iraq led to areas controlled by the Kurdistan Regional Government, while al-Yaarubiyah led to areas controlled by the Iraqi central government.

==== 2014: Fight against the Islamic State ====
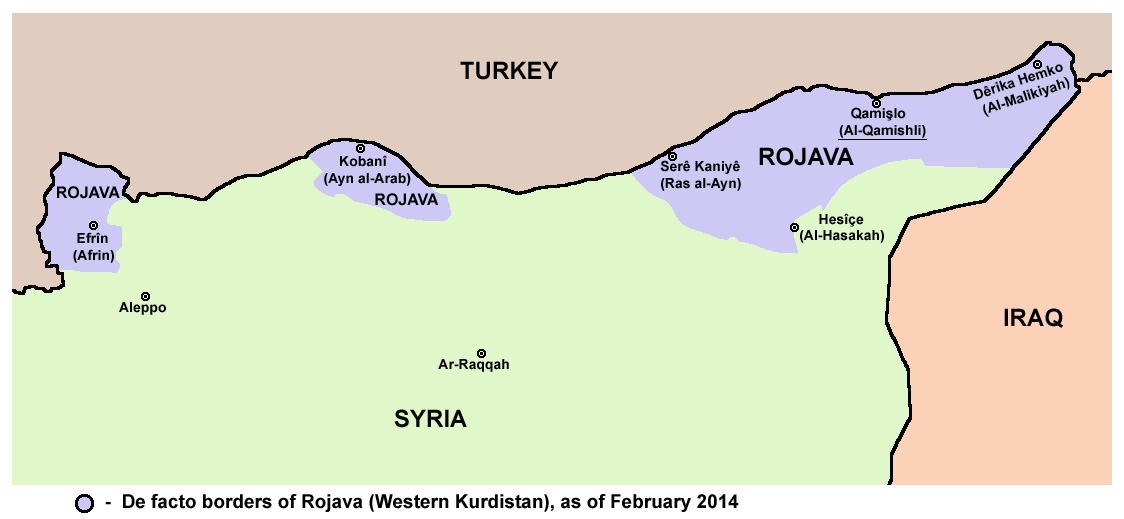
YPG-controlled territory, February 2014

In 2014, the Syriac Military Council, a group of Assyrian units, was formally integrated into the YPG's command structure. The inter-rebel conflict during the Syrian Civil War led to open war between the Free Syrian Army and IS in January 2014. The YPG collaborated with FSA groups to fight IS in Raqqa province; the group also formed an operations room with multiple FSA factions, called Euphrates Volcano. However, the general outcome of this campaign was a massive advance by IS, which effectively separated the eastern part of Rojava from the main force of FSA rebels. IS followed up on its success by attacking the YPG and the FSA in Kobanî Canton in March and fighting its way to the gates of the city of Kobanî in September. The actual siege of Kobanî approximately coincided with an escalation in the American-led intervention in Syria. This intervention had started with aiding the FSA against the government, but when the FSA was getting defeated by IS in eastern Syria, it escalated to bombing IS on Syrian territory.

With the world fearing another massacre in Kobanî, American support increased substantially. The US gave intense close air support to the YPG, and in doing so, started military cooperation with one of the factions. While it expected that IS would quickly crush the YPG and the FSA, this alliance was not considered a problem for the US. The YPG won the battle in early 2015.

Meanwhile, the situation had been stable in Afrin and Aleppo. The fight between the FSA and IS had led to a normalization in the relations between FSA and YPG since the end of 2013. In February 2015, the YPG signed a judicial agreement with the Levant Front in Aleppo.

==== Spring 2015: Offensive operations with coalition support ====
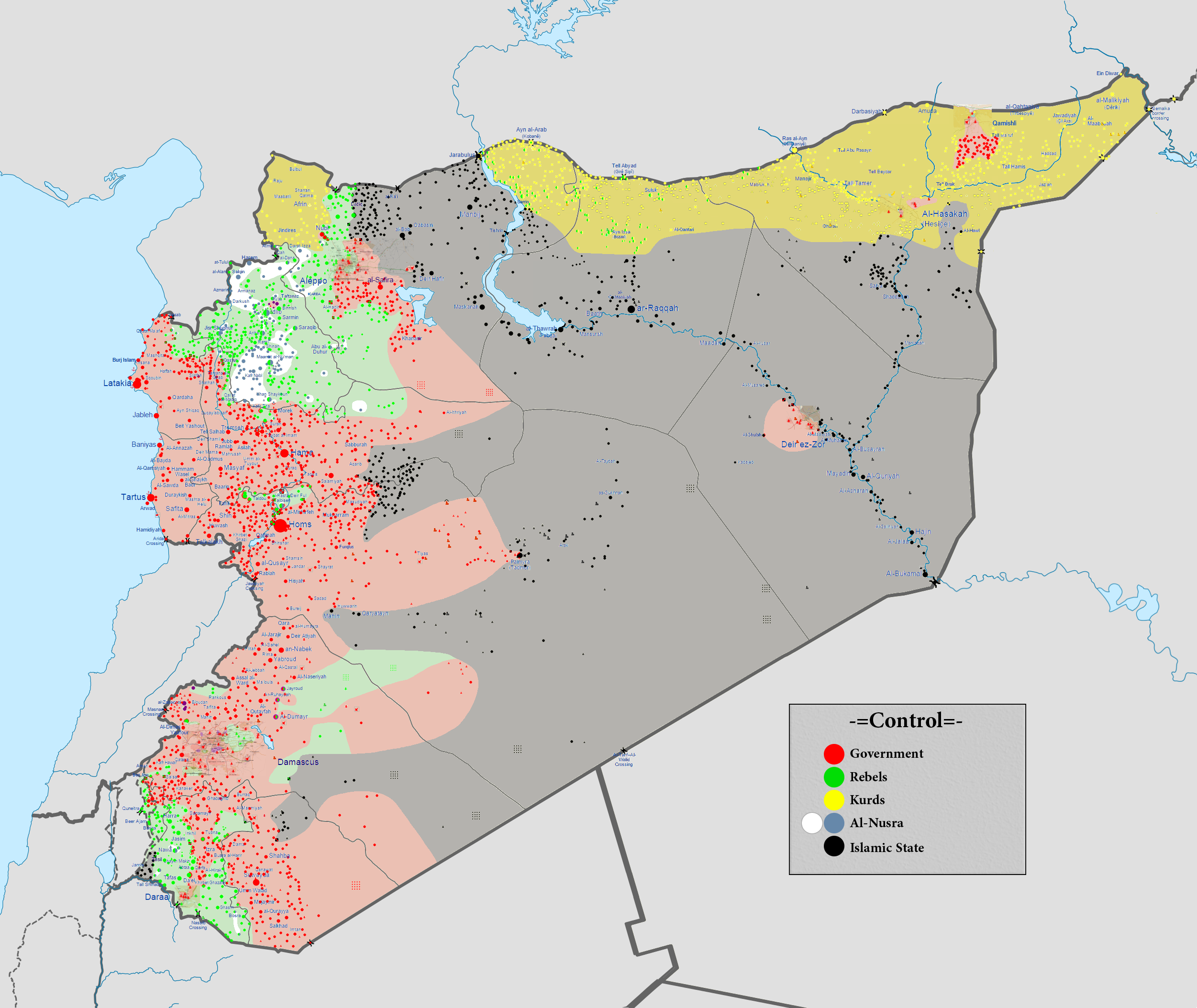
Military situation in the Syrian Civil War in November 2015

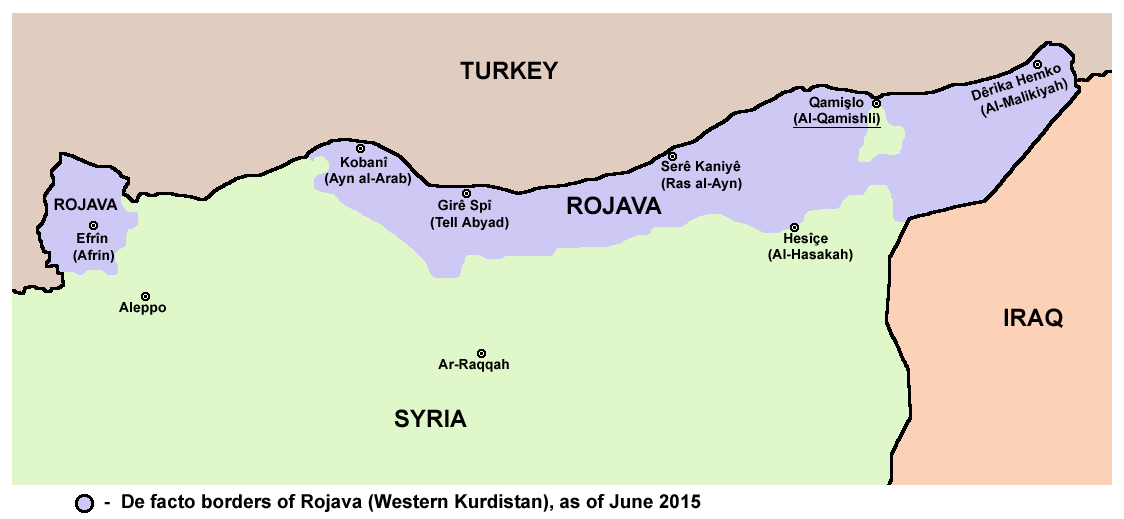
YPG-controlled territory, June 2015

The YPG was able and willing to offensively engage and put pressure on IS and had built up a track record as a reliable military partner of the US. In 2015, the YPG began its advance on Tel Abyad, a move they have planned for since November 2013. With American close air support, offensives near Hasakah and from Hasakah westward culminated in the conquest of Tell Abyad, linking up Kobanî with Hasakah in July 2015. With the capture of Tell Abyad, the YPG has also broken a major supply route of fighters and goods for the Islamic State.

With these offensives, the YPG had begun to make advances into areas that did not always have a Kurdish majority. When the YPG and the FSA entered the border town of Tell Abyad in June 2015, parts of the population fled the intense fighting and the airstrikes.

==== Autumn 2015: foundation of the SDF ====
The Syrian Democratic Forces was established in Hasakah on 11 October 2015. It has its origins in the YPG-FSA collaboration against IS, which had previously led to the establishment of the Euphrates Volcano joint operations room in 2014. Many of the partners are the same, and even the logo / flag with the Blue Euphrates symbol has common traits with that of Euphrates Volcano. The primary difference is that Euphrates Volcano was limited to coordinating the activities of independent Kurdish and Arab groups, while the SDF is a single organisation made up of Kurds, Arabs, and Assyrians.

The first success of the SDF was the capture of the strategic ethnically Arab town of al-Hawl from IS during the al-Hawl offensive in November 2015. This was followed in December by the Tishrin Dam offensive. The dam was captured on 26 December. Participating forces included the YPG, the FSA group Army of Revolutionaries, the tribal group al-Sanadid Forces and the Assyrian Syriac Military Council. The coalition had some heavy weapons and was supported by intense US led airstrikes. The capture of the hydroelectric dam also had positive effects on the economy of Rojava.

==== 2016 ====
In February, the YPG-led SDF launched the al-Shaddadi offensive, followed by the Manbij offensive in May, and the Raqqa and Aleppo offensives in November. These operations extended SDF-controlled territory, usually at IS's expense.

On 7 April 2016, the Kurdish neighborhood of Sheikh Maqsood in Aleppo was shelled with mortars that may have contained chemical agents (160 killed or wounded). Spokesperson for the YPG said that Saudi Arabia-backed Jaysh al-Islam (Army of Islam) rebel group has attacked the Kurdish neighborhood of Aleppo with "forbidden weapons" many times since the war's start.

==== 2018: Turkish military intervention in Afrin region ====
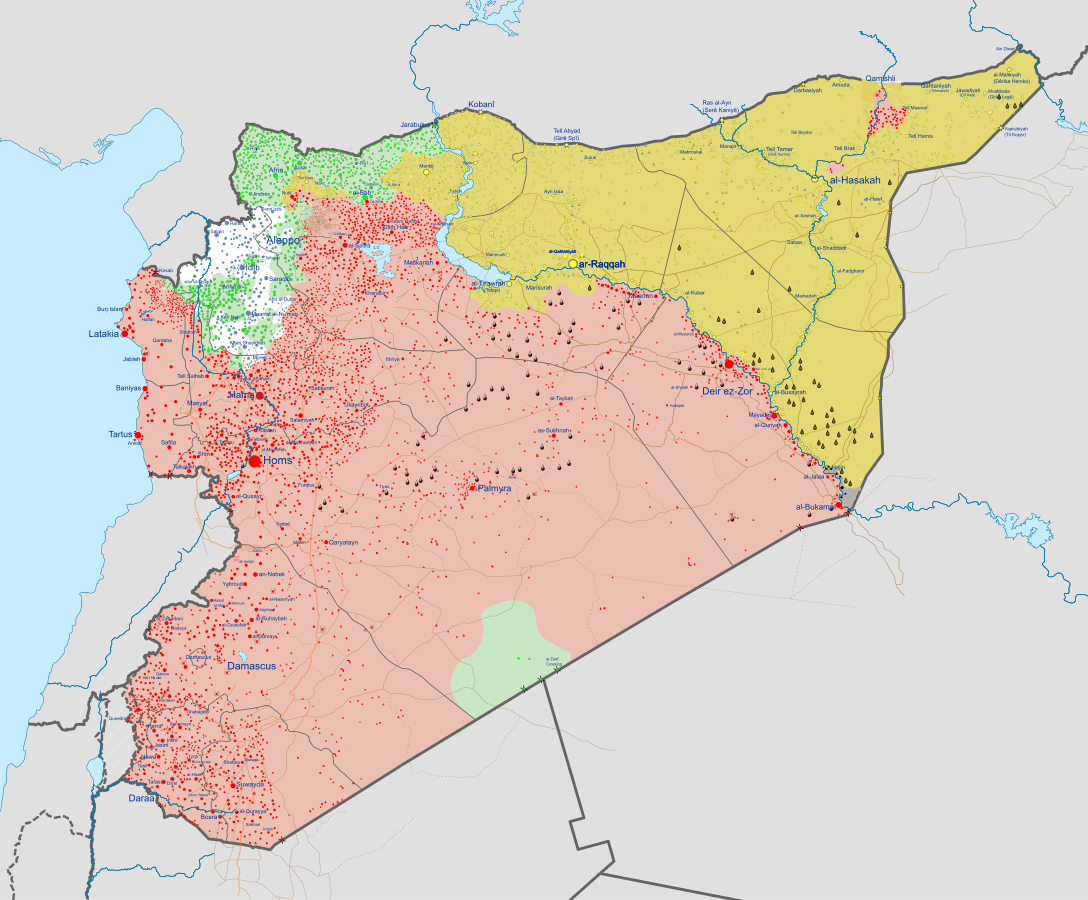
Military situation in January 2019

==== 2019: Turkish offensive into north-eastern Syria ====
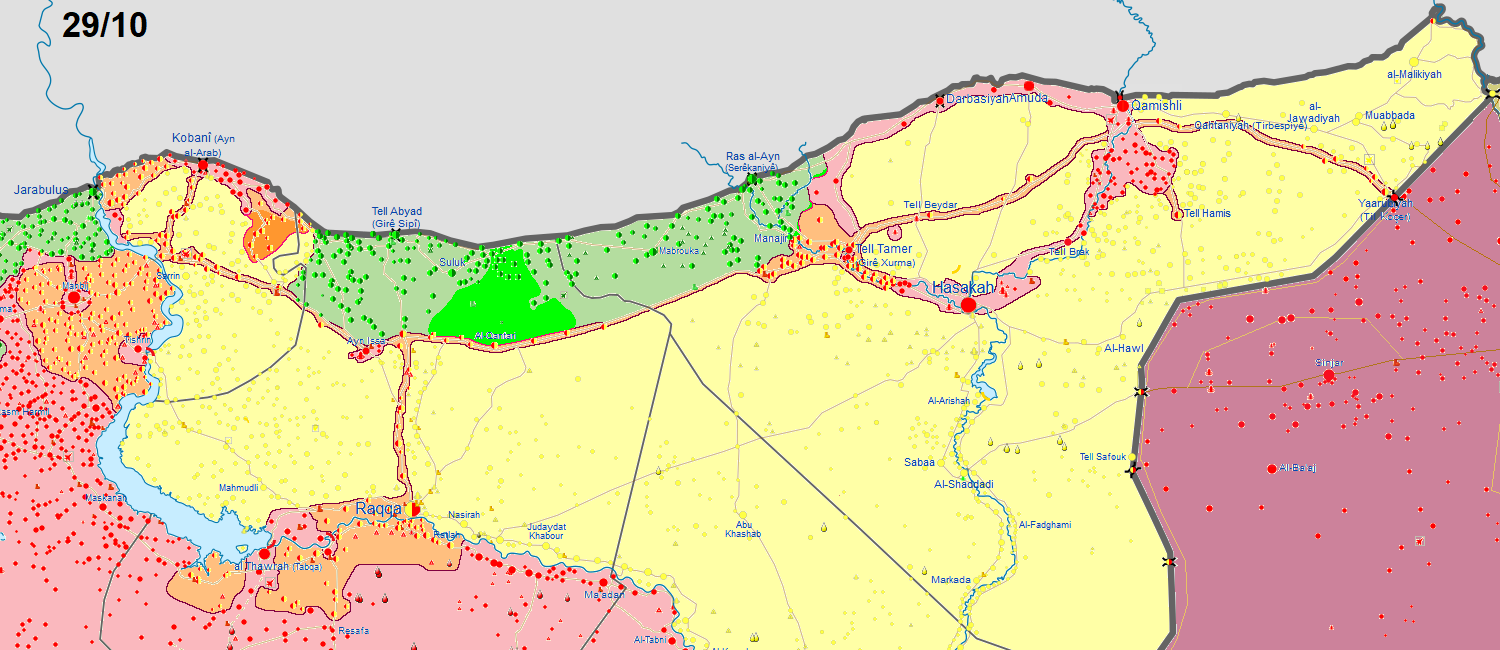
Turkish offensive into north-eastern Syria in October 2019

==== 2026: Integration into the Syrian army ====
In early 2026, with the SDF being incorporated into the Syrian Army, the Ministry of Defense under the Syrian transitional government said on 10 March that Sipan Hamo, commander of the People's Protection Units (YPG), had been appointed deputy defense minister for the country's eastern territories.

== Women's Protection Units ==
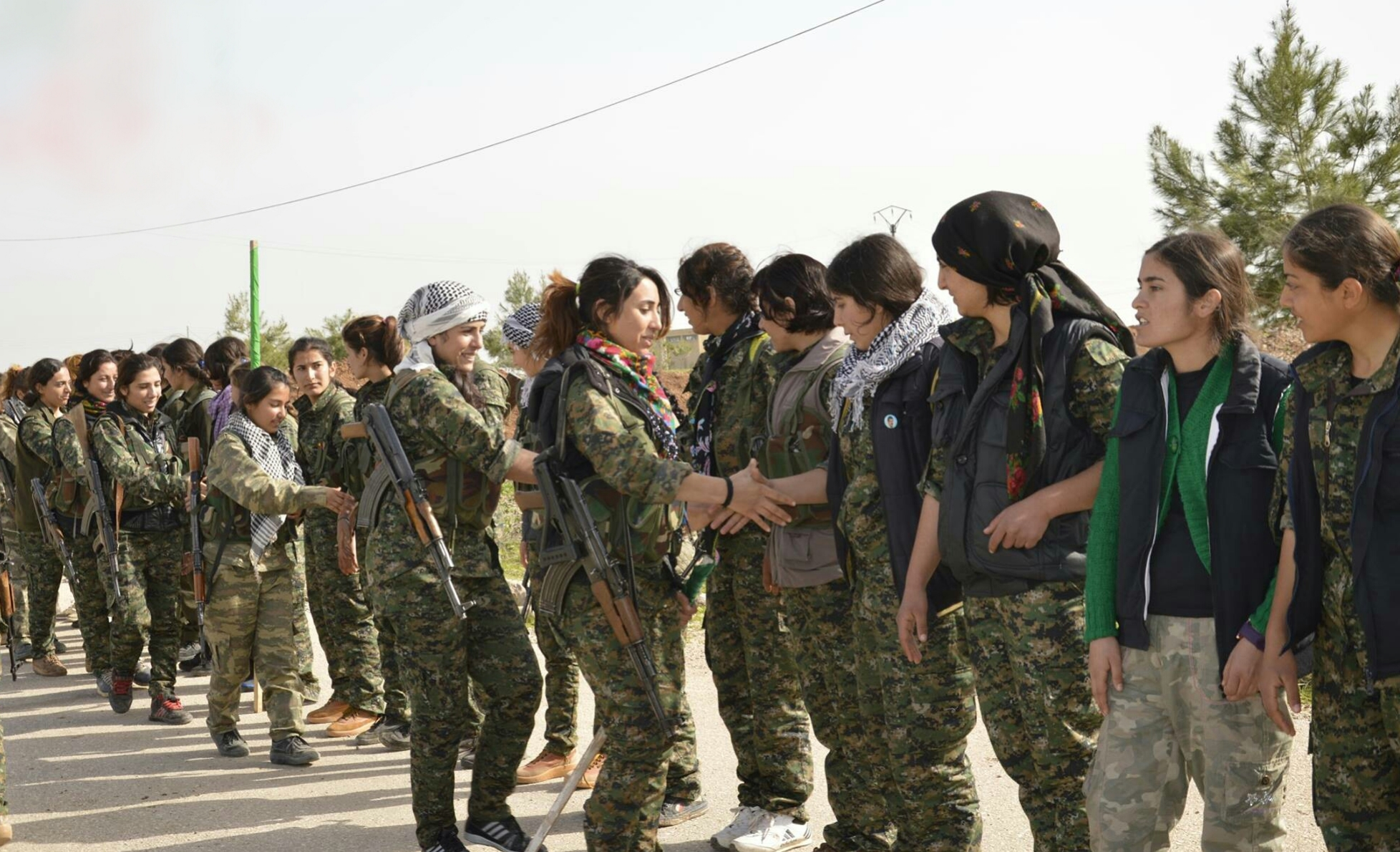
Women's Protection Units in November 2014

The Women's Protection Units (YPJ), also known as the Women's Defense Units, is the YPG's female brigade, which was set up in 2012. Kurdish media have said that YPJ troops became vital during the siege of Kobanî. Consisting of approximately 20,000 fighters, they make up around 40% of the YPG.

== Organization ==
=== Flags ===
Flags of the People's Protection Units

Vertical red flag of the YPG, used since 2011 until early 2013

Horizontal red flag of the YPG, used since 2011 until early 2013

Variant of the horizontal red flag, also used until early 2013

Yellow flag of the YPG, first used since late 2012, widely adopted in 2013 and since then the official flag of the militia

=== Units ===
In 2017, the YPG began to form units called regiments in translation, though they are smaller than comparable units in standard militaries:

Canton	Number	Name	Date Established	Strength
Afrin	1	Martyr Xebat Dêrik	27 February 2017	236 in 4 battalions
Afrin	2	Martyr Afrin	20 April 2017	235
Afrin	3	Martyr Rojhilet	Early June? 2017	236
Afrin	4	Martyr Mazloum	2 July 2017	234
Afrin	5	Martyr Alişêr	27 August 2017	303
Afrin	7	Martyr Jayan	23 October 2017	250
Afrin	8	Martyr Bahoz Afrin	18 November 2017	234

Canton	Number	Name	Date Established	Strength
Kobane	1	?	13 February 2017	80
Kobane	2	Martyr Şevger Kobanî Regiment	18 February 2017	90
Jazira – al-Hasakah	1	Jian Judy and Dogan Fadel	20 July 2017	500
Jazira – Girkê Legê	3	Qereçox Martyrs	12 July 2017	200
Aleppo	1	Martyr Shahid Baqour	30 September 2017	55 (Martyr Abu Shayar battalion)
Tabqa (SDF)	1	Martyr Haboun Arab	14 November 2017	250

=== Tactics ===
According to a report in IHS Jane's regarding the YPG,

Relying on speed, stealth, and surprise, it is the archetypal guerrilla army, able to deploy quickly to front lines and concentrate its forces before quickly redirecting the axis of its attack to outflank and ambush its enemy. The key to its success is autonomy. Although operating under an overarching tactical rubric, YPG brigades are inculcated with a high degree of freedom and can adapt to the changing battlefield.

The YPG relies heavily on snipers and backs them by suppressing enemy fire using mobile heavy machine guns. It also uses roadside bombs to prevent outflanking maneuvers, particularly at night. Its lines have generally held when attacked by Islamic State (IS) forces who have better equipment, including helmets and body armor.

The YPG and People's Defense Forces (HPG) have also trained and equipped more than 1,000 Yazidis, who operate in the Mount Sinjar area as local defense units under their supervision.

The YPG calls itself a people's army, and therefore appoints officers by internal elections.

A 20-year-old female YPJ fighter named Zlukh Hamo (Nom de guerre: Avesta Khabur) was reported to have carried out a suicide attack towards Turkish troops and a tank during the early phase of the Afrin Offensive, killing herself and several soldiers in the process. The attack was commended by pro-SDF sources as a courageous attack against a tank using explosives, which killed her in the process.

=== Equipment ===
VOA report showing a YPG technical near Tell Tamer, 2015

In comparison to the other major factions involved in the Syrian Civil War, the YPG has the least armor. To compensate for the resulting capability gap, the YPG became heavily involved in the production of DIY armoured vehicles, typically based on bulldozers or large trucks. The YPG has traditionally relied on vehicles captured from the Islamic State, AFVs left behind by the Syrian Arab Army (SyAA), equipment turned over by the SyAA in exchange for a safe passage (for example, after retreating from Mennagh airbase in 2014), and armoured vehicles donated by the US for light armoured vehicles and true armour.

While other Syrian Civil War factions, such as the Islamic State, amassed an arsenal of hundreds of tanks and other armored fighting vehicles captured from the Syrian Arab Army, the YPG, which frequently avoided combat with government forces, had to make do with scraps. The YPG was able to acquire several vehicle types, including the BTR-60 and BRDM-2, that had been abandoned in government bases by their previous owners. With no other option, even these abandoned vehicles would be repaired and repurposed by the YPG. Even when the engine couldn't be repaired, the hulls of BTR-60s were strapped to the backs of trucks and used as improvised AFVs.

With little armor and other heavy weaponry, the YPG relied almost entirely on Coalition airpower to destroy Islamic State vehicles and fighting positions. While this meant that Islamic State-operated AFVs were frequently destroyed before they could inflict serious damage on YPG forces, it also meant that most AFVs were completely obliterated by Coalition aircraft, preventing their capture and further use with the YPG.

In order to assist the SDF in its fight against Islamic State forces in northern Syria, the YPG received a large number of infantry mobility vehicles (IMVs) and mine-resistant ambush protected vehicles (MRAPs) from the US, which appear to have replaced some of the YPG's more bizarre homemade armour designs. Surprisingly, the YPG was permitted to keep these vehicles even after IS was defeated as a conventional military force. Even so, there was little doubt that their most likely future application would be against a NATO member (Turkey). Aside from a large fleet of Humvees, IAG Guardians, and M1224 Maxxpros, the US has reportedly transferred a number of M2 Bradley infantry fighting vehicles (IFVs) to the YPG. These reports appear to be based on the sighting of M2s with SDF flags and a video of YPG members training alongside M2s, and there is currently no evidence that such a transfer has occurred.

The YPG's arsenal of ATGMs is without a doubt the most dangerous threat to the Turkish military. Despite capturing only a small number of these missiles from the Syrian Arab Army, the YPG has managed to secure a steady supply of ATGMs obtained on the Syrian black market. These have included models like the 9M113 Konkurs and 9M115 Metis-M, as well as more advanced models like the 9M133 Kornet and even the US TOW ATGM. Despite frequently employing them against the Free Syrian Army and Turkish military, the YPG is likely to keep a significant stock of missiles on hand for future use against Turkish armour and troop concentrations.

== International outreach ==
=== Foreign volunteers ===
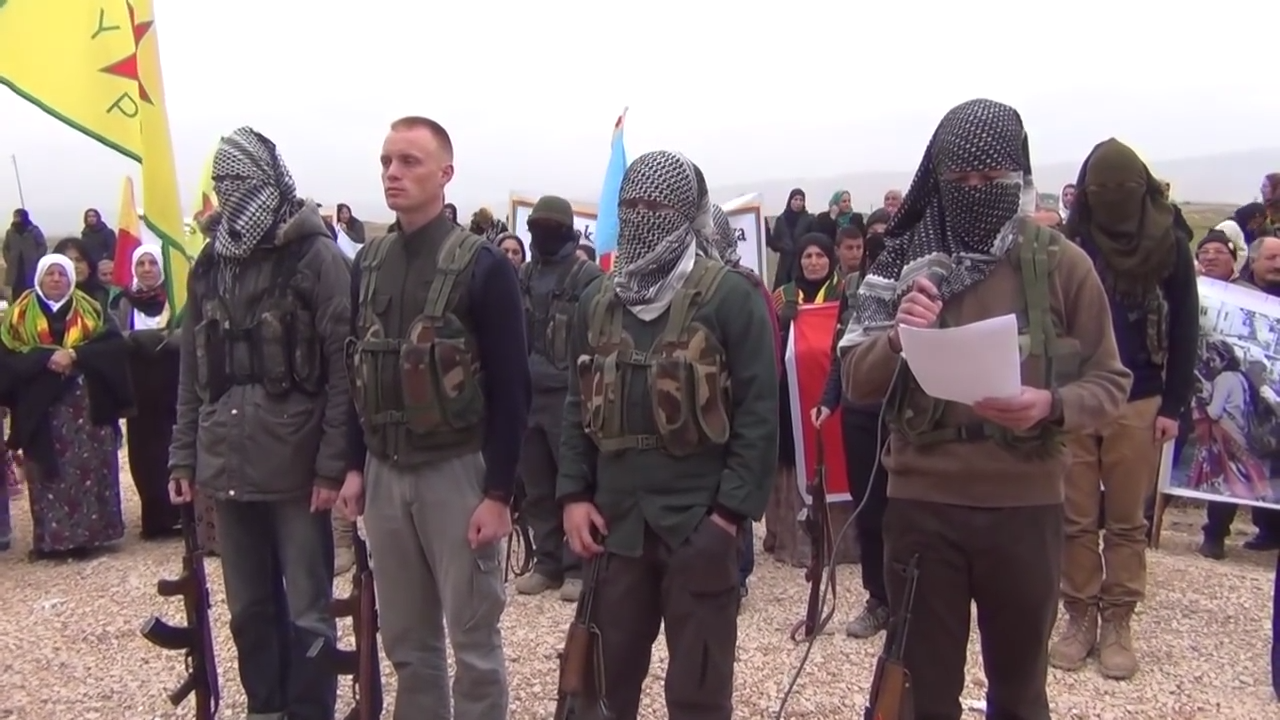
German, French, and Spanish fighters of the YPG in northern Syria.

Ex–U.S. Army soldier Jordan Matson was among the first foreign volunteers of the YPG. Injured by an IS suicide bomb, he developed the "Lions of Rojava" recruitment campaign for foreign volunteers, launched on 21 October 2014 on Facebook. More than 400 volunteers from Europe, the Americas and Australia have joined the YPG as of 11 June 2015, including at least ten U.S. volunteers, three of which were U.S. Army veterans. People from both China and the Chinese diaspora have also joined.

Other prominent foreign volunteers have included Brace Belden, Macer Gifford, Ryan Lock, Michael Israel, Nazzarno Tassone, Dean Evans, Jac Holmes, Konstandinos Erik Scurfield, Anna Campbell, Lorenzo Orsetti, Haukur Hilmarsson and Michael Enright.

Dozens of non-Kurdish Turks (from both Turkey and the European diaspora) have also joined. The Turkish Marxist–Leninist Communist Party (MLKP) has been sending volunteers to fight in the YPG since 2012. At least four have been killed in battle as of February 2015—one during the Battle of Ras al-Ayn and three during the siege of Kobanî. The party released a video in late January 2015 showing several Spanish- and German-speaking volunteers from Europe among its ranks in Jazira Canton; they were reorganised into the International Freedom Battalion on 10 June 2015.

==== Deaths ====
During the fight against IS and the defense of Afrin against the Turkish state, several of the international volunteers were wounded and killed. The Icelandic Haukur Hilmarsson, aged 31, was killed on 24 February 2018 in an artillery attack by the Turkish army in the village of Mabeta, Afrin. As a YPJ fighter, the British woman Anna Campbell, 26, from Lewes in East Sussex, was killed in a Turkish airstrike in Afrin on 15 March 2018. In the battle of Al-Baghuz Fawqani, an Italian man fighting for the YPG, Lorenzo Orsetti, was killed on Sunday, 17 March 2019.

==== Politics ====
While most countries do not object in principle to their citizens joining the ranks of the YPG, Turkey has been vocal against YPG's foreign recruits.

Several Australians, including former trade unionist and politician Matthew Gardiner, have been involved with the YPG despite threats by Australia to prosecute any citizens involved in the Syrian Civil War. Under Australian law it is a criminal offence to fight with any side in a foreign conflict.

In 2017, Turkish court sentenced two Czech nationals to more than six years in prison for their reported ties to the YPG. In Germany, the YPG leads to controversies as it is up to the police to begin a prosecution for showing a YPG flag. In the state of Bavaria, fines for showing a YPG flag were issued, while the federal government declares that the YPG is not forbidden.

=== Foreign government support ===
Because the YPG operates in a landlocked territory, rival opposition groups as well as the Turkish and Syrian government were able to physically prevent foreign aid from reaching it. The YPG's seizure of Til Koçer in October 2013 (cf. above) created an overland connection to more or less friendly groups in Iraq, but could not change the even more fundamental problem, that the YPG had no allies willing to provide equipment.

==== United States ====
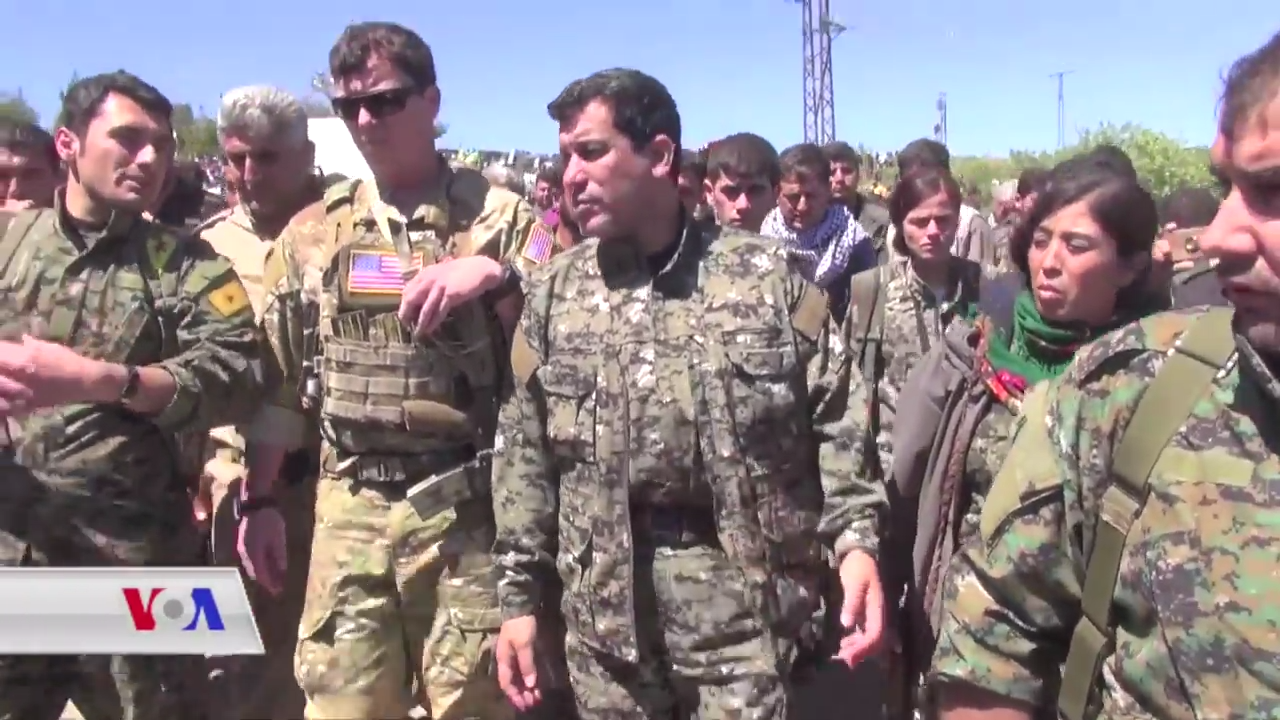
A Delta Force officer and YPG and YPJ commanders tour an area hit by Turkish airstrikes in April 2017

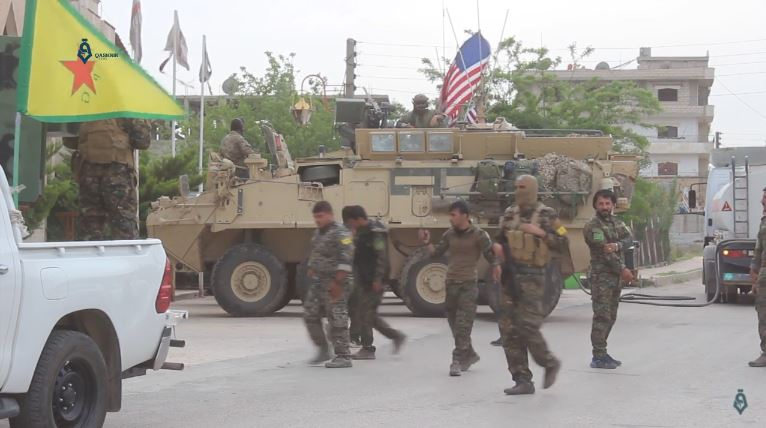
U.S. Army M1126 Stryker armored vehicle in Al-Hasakah, May 2017

In August 2014 Mazlum Kobanî led negotiations with the US in Sulaymaniya, which led to a military alliance against IS. The United States provided the YPG with air support during the siege of Kobanî and during later campaigns, helping the YPG defend territory against attacks by the Islamic State. Turkey has criticised US support.

The YPG also received 27 bundles totalling 24 tons of small arms and ammunition and 10 tons of medical supplies from the United States and Iraqi Kurdistan during the siege of Kobanî.

On 11 October 2015, the US began an operation to airdrop 120 tons of military supplies to the YPG and its local Arab and Turkmen allies to fight IS north of Raqqa. The first airdrop consisted of 112 pallets of ammunition and "other items like hand grenades", totaling 50 tons. However, statements from the US that the aid did not contain TOW's or anti-aircraft weapons made it clear that the U.S. continued to have serious regard for the interests of Turkey, which has warned against continued US support for the YPG. On the other hand, the US also supported Islamist rebel groups who fought the YPG. During the Battle of Aleppo, the US-backed Mountain Hawks Brigade battled the YPG and the Army of Revolutionaries for control of the village of Maryamin.

US aid to the YPG continued in late October with the deployment of up to 50 US special forces to assist the YPG, and an enhanced air campaign to support the YPG and local militia groups in their fight against IS. Some of these special forces participated in the al-Shaddadi offensive (2016) and coordinated airstrikes against IS.

During the Battle of Tabqa (2017), YPG special forces were equipped with US-supplied combat helmets, AN/PVS-7 night vision devices, flashlights, and were armed with M4 carbines equipped with AN/PEQ-2 laser sights, holographic weapon sights, and STANAG magazines.

On 9 May 2017, it was announced by the Pentagon that American President Donald Trump approved of a plan that would have the United States directly provide heavy armaments to the major SDF component group, the YPG; the plan came before a planned final offensive to capture Raqqa from ISIS.

==== Russia ====
With Russia's entrance into the war in late 2015 backing the Syrian government, some reports have reported that the YPG coordinated with or received weapons from Russia, with rival opposition groups stating that the timing and targeting of Russian airstrikes were "suspiciously advantageous" to the Kurdish militias.

Despite this, YPG officials have said they did not cooperate with Russia. However, in July 2019, Rashid Abu Khawla the head of the Syrian Democratic Forces' Deir ez-Zor Military Council stated that the Syrian Democratic Forces had cooperated with Russia.

==== Finland and Sweden ====
Finland and Sweden's alleged support for the YPG is one of the points which caused Turkey to oppose Finland and Sweden's NATO accession bid. YPG was included in the declaration in the trilateral memorandum signed by Turkey, Finland and Sweden during the NATO summit in Madrid on 28 June 2022, but did not define it as a terrorist organization. In June 2022, then–Finnish President Sauli Niinistö announced in Madrid, after the agreement with Turkey, that Finland does not see the YPG as a terrorist organization and that Finland will continue to support the YPG.

=== Diplomatic relations ===
Russia's position towards the YPG is not clear, and the US actively supports it, but their diplomatic relations with the PYD are the opposite. In January 2016 Russia pushed for the inclusion of the PYD in the Geneva talks. The YPG would like to open a representative branch in the US, but in March 2016 interview its leader implied that it was not allowed to do so.

In February 2018, USA's Director of National Intelligence in the Trump administration described YPG as the Syrian wing of PKK in its new report.

=== International media outreach ===
The YPG's press office media operation has been a particular focus of its opponents, with Turkey bombing its premises in Cizire Canton in April 2017, and the Islamic State (IS) singling out its premises in Raqqa for a raid during the late stages of the Battle of Raqqa in September 2017.

== Allegations concerning violations of international law and war crimes ==
=== Accusations of ethnic cleansing and forced displacements ===
In June 2015 the Turkish government stated that the YPG was carrying out an ethnic cleansing as part of a plan to join the Jazira and Kobanî cantons into a single territory.

The U.S. State Department reacted by starting an inquiry into the allegations.

In October 2015, Amnesty International published a report with reports that the YPG had driven at least 100 families from northern Syria and that in the villages of Asaylem and Husseiniya it had demolished resident homes. The report was made by Amnesty visiting the area contained in the report. It made local observations of destruction, and collected testimonies from former and actual residents of al-Hasakeh and Raqqa governorates. It found cases of YPG fighters forcibly displacing residents and using fire and bulldozers to raze homes and other structures.

In a report published by the United Nations' Independent International Commission of Inquiry on the Syrian Arab Republic on 10 March 2017, the Commission refuted Amnesty International's reports of ethnic cleansing, stating that "'though allegations of 'ethnic cleansing' continued to be received during the period under review, the Commission found no evidence to substantiate reports that YPG or SDF forces ever targeted Arab communities on the basis of ethnicity." Forced displacement of civilians and destruction of civilian property is not a war crime per se. These acts only become a war crime when there is no "imperative military necessity" for them. Amnesty International stated the report documents cases in which there was no such justification. It furthermore states that "the circumstances of some of these displacements suggested that they were carried out in retaliation for people's perceived sympathies with, or family ties to, suspected members of IS or other armed groups", thus constituting "collective punishment, which is a violation of international humanitarian law".

In interviews, YPG spokespersons acknowledged that a number of families were in fact displaced. However, they placed the number at no more than 25, and stated military necessity. They stated that the family members of terrorists maintained communications with them, and therefore had to be removed from areas where they might pose a danger. They further stated that IS was using civilians in those areas to plant car bombs or carry out other attacks on the YPG. By describing the events in Hammam al-Turkman before the village was evacuated, the Amnesty International report itself inadvertently supports these YPG reports of military necessity.

=== Recruitment of minors ===
In June 2014, Human Rights Watch criticized the YPG for accepting minors into their ranks, picking up on multiple earlier reports of teenage fighters serving in the YPG, with a report by the United Nations Secretary General stating that 24 minors under age of 18 had been recruited by YPG, compared to 124 having been recruited by the Free Syrian Army and 5 by the Syrian Arab Army. In response, the YPG and YPJ signed the Geneva Call Deed of Commitment protecting children in armed conflict, prohibiting sexual violence and against gender discrimination in July 2014. Kurdish security forces (YPG and Asayish) began receiving human rights training from Geneva Call and other international organizations with the YPG pledging to demobilize all fighters under 18 within a month and began to enact disciplinary measures against commanders of the units that had involved in corruption and accepting recruit under age of 18 to their ranks. In October 2015 the YPG demobilized 21 minors from the military service in its ranks.

According to the annual UN report of 2018, there were 224 cases of child recruitment by the YPG and its women's unit, the YPJ, in 2017, an almost fivefold increase from the previous year. This sparked immediate conversations with the anti-child-recruitment NGO Geneva Call which resulted in a broad new military directive strictly prohibiting all recruitment of persons under 18, ordering that any such persons within SDF be immediately removed from the payroll and transferred to the custody of the civilian Authority For Education, mandating the appointment of an ombudsman in each military service to receive and investigate reports of child recruitment, and ordering punitive measures by military police and by the SDF's Military Discipline Department against anyone found to be responsible for child recruitment. Geneva Call immediately praised the SDF's wide-ranging initiative to eliminate and prevent child recruitment throughout all of SDF's military organizations.

In June 2020, United Nations reported the YPG/YPJ as the largest faction in the Syrian civil war by the number of recruited child soldiers with 283 child soldiers followed by Hayat Tahrir al-Sham with 245 child soldiers.

On 15 July 2020, SDF issued a new military order prohibiting child recruitment. The NGO Fight For Humanity conducted multiple training sessions with hundreds of SDF commanders about the UN-SDF Action Plan To Prevent Child Recruitment, and distributed informational posters and flyers about it written in both Arabic and Kurdish, as part of an ongoing educational process. Syria-based researcher Thomas McClure observed that “SDF are less likely to engage in such practices than any of the other forces in Syria, but seek to hold themselves to a higher standard of accountability and human rights.”

On 29 August 2020, SDF announced the creation of a new system that anyone can use to confidentially report to specialized Child Protection offices any suspected case of child recruitment, in accordance with the action plan that the SDF signed with the United Nations in the summer of 2019.

On 23 April 2021, the UN released its third report on child recruitment in Syria, noting that the SDF's action plan had resulted in a significant decrease in child recruitment (from 216 cases in early 2019 to only 41 cases in early 2020), but that elsewhere in Syria, child recruitment continued to be systematic and widespread within Syrian government and non-government armed forces.

== See also ==
- International Freedom Battalion
- Kurdish Front
- Kurdistan Workers' Party (PKK)
- Party of Free Life of Kurdistan (PJAK)
- Peshmerga
- Sutoro
- YPG–FSA relations
- AANES–Syria relations
- List of armed groups in the Syrian Civil War

== Bibliography ==
- Rashid, Bedir Mulla (2018) [1st pub. 2017]. Military and Security Structures of the Autonomous Administration in Syria. Translated by Obaida Hitto. Istanbul: Omran for Strategic Studies. Archived from the original on 1 July 2018.
