= Ahrar al-Jazeera =

Rebel group in the Syrian Civil War

Ahrar al-Jazeera Brigade
- Arabic: لواء أحرار الجزيرة
- Ahrar al-Jazeera logo
- Leaders: Nawaf al-Assi; Sheikh Hamad
- Dates active: 2013–2014
- Active regions: Hasakah Governorate, Syria
- Ideology: Islamism
- Part of: Free Syrian Army
- Wars: Syrian Civil War

The Ahrar al-Jazeera Brigade (Arabic: لواء أحرار الجزيرة, "Free Men of al-Jazeera") was a group of Shammar Arab tribesmen that was active during the Syrian Civil War and was instrumental in beginning the operation which resulted in the capture of Yaroubiya in March 2013 (with assistance from other rebel groups). At this point, the unit also assisted anti-Kurdish forces in the Battle of Ras al-Ayn (2012–13). The group was kicked out of Yaroubiya in September 2013 after it was claimed by the Al-Nusra Front and the Islamic State of Iraq and the Levant that the group was corrupt and too secular.

In 2016, remnants of the group formed the Elite Forces.

== See also ==
- List of armed groups in the Syrian Civil War
