= Kurdish Supreme Committee =

Self-proclaimed governing body in Northern Syria (2012–2013)

- Desteya Bilind a Kurd
- Emblem of the Kurdish Supreme Committee
- Abbreviation: DBK (Kurdish); KSC (English)
- Formation: July 12, 2012; 14 years ago
- Founded at: Erbil
- Dissolved: 12 November 2013
- Purpose: Self-governance of Syrian Kurdistan
- Headquarters: Kobani
- Region served: Northern Syria
- Official language: Kurdish

The Kurdish Supreme Committee (Kurdish: Desteya Bilind a Kurd; DBK) was a self-proclaimed governing body in Northern Syria, which was founded by the Kurdish Democratic Union Party (PYD) and the Kurdish National Council (KNC), following the signing on 12 July 2012 of a cooperation agreement between the two parties in Hewlêr, Iraqi Kurdistan under the auspice of the Iraqi Kurdistan President Massoud Barzani. The member board consists of an equal number of PYD and KNC members.

The DBK sought to fill the power vacuum left behind by the retreating Syrian Army in mid-2012 during the Syrian Civil War. It claimed self-governance based on Kurdish ethnicity of the population. The committee's armed wing consisted of the People's Protection Units (YPG) and Women's Protection Units (YPJ) and was complemented with the Asayish police force.

The PYD increased its influence and control within Kurdish populated regions of Northern Syria, and increasing marginalization of the Kurdish National Council led to the KNC abandoning the DBK on 12 November 2013, and the Movement for a Democratic Society (TEV-DEM), a coalition led by the PYD, declared a new administration. The new administration pursued a democratic confederalism model, moving towards a more decentralized and multi-ethnic structure.

== See also ==
- Rojava conflict
- Group of Communities in Kurdistan
- List of armed groups in the Syrian Civil War
- A Modern History of the Kurds by David McDowall
