= Al-Yaarubiyah =

Al-Yaarubiyah ٱلْيَعْرُبِيَّة
- Town
- Location within Syria
- Coordinates: 36°48′42″N 42°3′59″E
- Country: Syria
- Governorate: al-Hasakah
- District: al-Malikiyah
- Subdistrict: al-Yaarubiyah

Population (2004)
  - Total: 6,066
- Time zone: UTC+3 (AST)

Al-Yaarubiyah (Arabic: ٱلْيَعْرُبِيَّة, romanized: al-Yaʿrubīyah) is a town in al-Hasakah Governorate, Syria. According to the Syria Central Bureau of Statistics (CBS), Al-Yaarubiyah had a population of 6,066 in the 2004 census. It is the administrative center of a nahiyah ("subdistrict") consisting of 62 localities with a combined population of 39,459 in 2004.

Its population are mostly Sunni Muslim Arabs of the Shammar tribe. During the Syrian civil war in March 2013, the town came under the control of Islamist jihadist rebels, including the al-Nusra Front and Ahrar al-Sham, but was later captured by Kurdish YPG forces in October 2013, bringing it into the administration of Rojava. On January 20, 2026 the town came under the control of the Syrian transitional government.

== Border post ==
The town was the border post between French-Syria and British-Iraq and had a railway station on the Baghdad Railway. It is twinned by Rabia on the Iraqi side of the border.

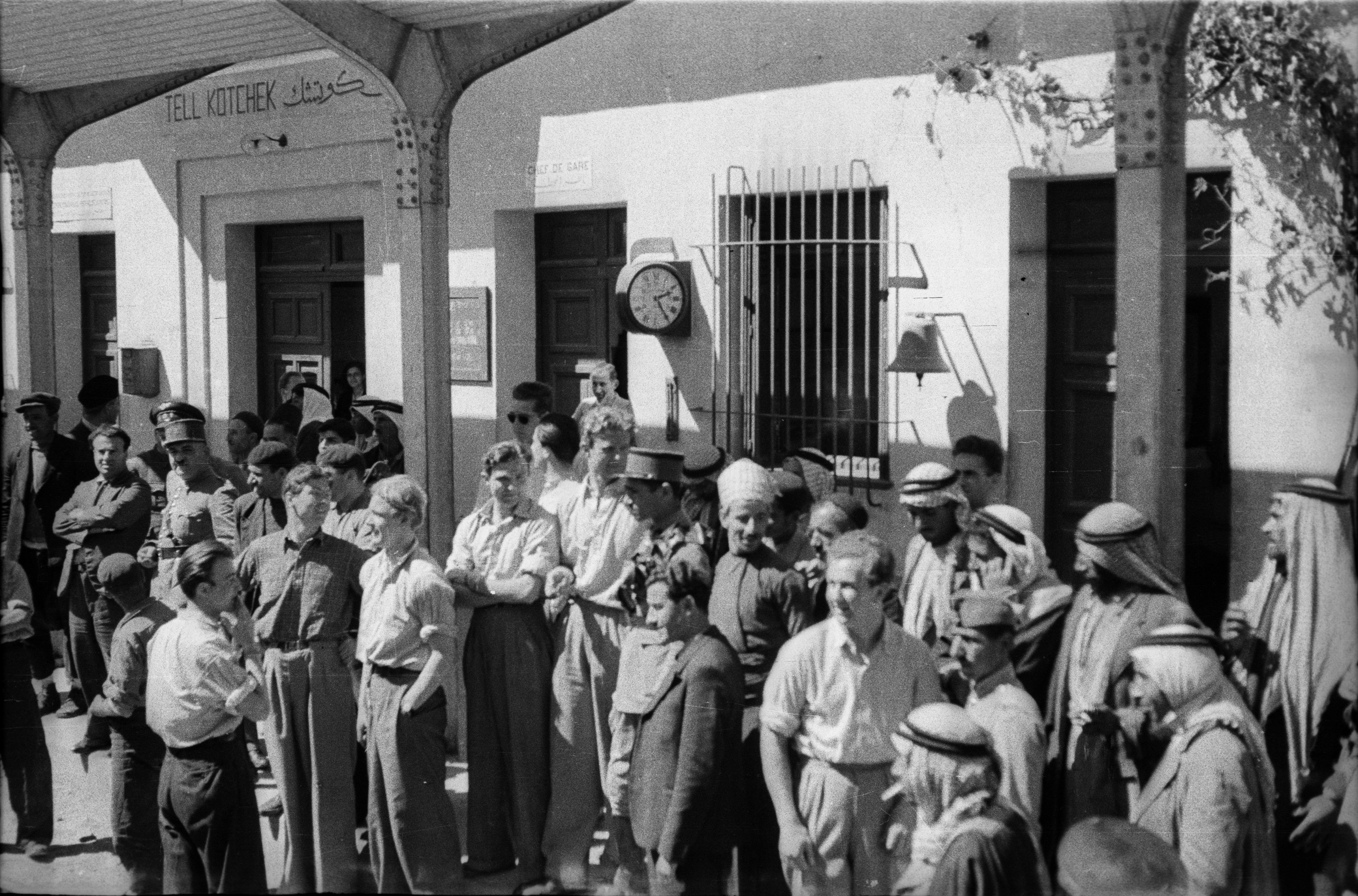
Germans, Norwegians, French-Syrian colonial officials and others at the train station in Tell Kotchek, 1940.
