= Kurdish Democratic Progressive Party =

Political party in Syria

Kurdish Democratic Progressive Party in Syria Partiya Dîmoqratî Pêşverû Kurd li Sûriyê
- Secretary-General: Abd al-Hamid Darwish (formerly)
- Founded: 1965
- Split from: PDK-S
- Headquarters: Amuda, al-Hasakah Governorate, Syria
- Paramilitary wing: None (de jure); LJASS and YPG (de facto)
- Membership: c. 9,600 (2011 estimate)
- Ideology: Federalism; Kurdish nationalism Socialism
- Political position: Centre-left to centre-right
- National affiliation: Kurdish Democratic Alliance in Syria (1994–?); ENKS (2011–15)
- People's Council: 0 / 250
- Democratic Council: 0 / 43

The Kurdish Democratic Progressive Party in Syria (Kurdish: Partiya Dîmoqratî Pêşverû Kurd li Sûriyê; abbreviated PDPKS, KDPP or Pêşverû) is one of the oldest Kurdish parties in Syria, having been active since seceding from the Kurdistan Democratic Party of Syria the 1960s. Prominently led by Abd al-Hamid Darwish for much of its history, who was described as "one of the last remaining of the original Kurdish political activists", the PDPKS serves as the Syrian sister party of the Iraqi Patriotic Union of Kurdistan. Known for its moderate and conciliatory politics, the party has sided at different times during the Syrian Civil War with the Syrian opposition, the Ba'athist government, the Kurdish National Council (of which it was a founding member), and the Democratic Union Party.

== History ==
=== Beginnings and politics under the Ba'athist government ===
The origins of the PDPKS were closely intertwined with Abd al-Hamid Darwish, a long-time Kurdish politician and activist. Born in a rural village of the al-Darbasiyah Subdistrict, Darwish was the son of an agricultural landowner family and as student became an activist for Syrian Kurdish issues; because of that, he was arrested several times. In 1956/57, Darwish helped to found the Kurdistan Democratic Party of Syria (KDPS) and was part of the party's leading figures until the mid-1960s. By then, the KDPS had unofficially split into two ideological camps, with one following a more traditional, conservative Kurdish nationalism, while the other espoused a modernist, national ideology. The tensions between these camps resulted in several small factions breaking off from the party; Darwish himself was excluded from the KDPS over disagreements in 1963. The party finally broke apart in 1965, when it divided into the "Kurdish Democratic Party in Syria (Left Wing)" and the "Kurdish Democratic Party in Syria (Right Wing)", the latter being led by Abd al-Hamid Darwish. This year is now regarded has the de facto founding year of the PDPKS. Unlike the other KDPS factions, Darwish's party occupied a more moderate stance between radical Leftist and conservative views.

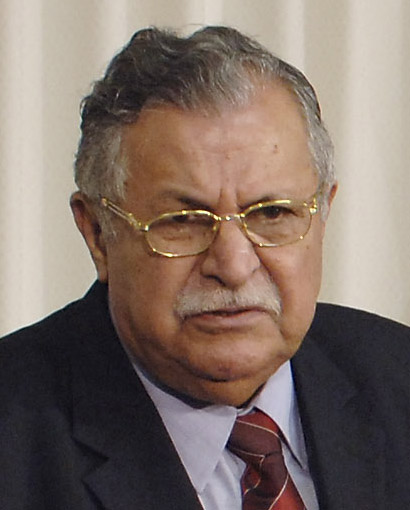
The alliance with Jalal Talabani (pictured) decisively influenced the history of the PDPKS.

Though the two KDPS main faction briefly reunited in 1970 under pressure by the Iraqi Kurdistan Democratic Party (KDP), Darwish and his followers soon broke off again and revived the KDPS (right wing). At the time, Darwish's party primarily included urban merchants, professionals, religious leaders and landowners. Internationally, the KDPS (right wing) aligned itself with the programmatically similar Iraqi KDP faction of Jalal Talabani. When Talabani announced in 1975 that he would break with the KDP and form his own party, the Patriotic Union of Kurdistan (PUK), Darwish believed that it would be only fitting if he likewise changed his party's name to distance himself from the KDP. As result, his faction adopted the name "Kurdish Democratic Progressive Party" (PDPKS) in 1976. Elements within the PDPKS disagreed with the pro-Talabani course of Darwish, however, and over the following years broke away from the PDPKS to form their own parties. These splinter groups included one pro-Barzani faction that readopted the KDPS name; another faction led by Aziz Dawei that also called itself "Kurdish Democratic Progressive Party", (Note: Aziz Dawei's party changed its name to "Kurdish Democratic Equality Party in Syria", also known as Wekhevi Party, in 2008.) and finally Taher Sufuk's followers who formed the Kurdish National Democratic Party. Meanwhile, the main KDPS group (the one from which Darwish had broken away in 1970) came to be supported by the KDP. As the KDP and PUK grew into bitter rivals, the tensions between them negatively influenced the relationship between the PDPKS and the KDPS. The party later suffered from one more split, when a group broke away under the leadership of Faysal Yusuf and formed the "Kurdish Reform Movement". (Note: A faction under Amjad Othman later split from the Kurdish Reform Movement, forming their own party but also calling itself "Kurdish Reform Movement in Syria")

Despite this, the PDPKS and KDPS tried to work together again in 1980, when they as well as the Kurdish Left Party in Syria attempted to form a political coalition. The three parties even signed a coalition agreement, but the plan collapsed when the Kurdish Left Party split over internal disagreements. As the relations between the PDPKS and the KDPS stagnated in the 1980s, the former instead began to cooperate with other allies of the PUK, such as the PKK and the PDKI. The PDPKS would also develop good relations with the PKK-affiliated Democratic Union Party (PYD).

Even though part of the opposition, the PDPKS wanted to avoid open confrontation with the Ba'athist dictatorship under Hafez al-Assad, instead trying to bring about a peaceful democratization through soft pressure on the government and participation in the elections. Darwish won a seat in the parliament during the elections in 1990, which were more free than usual. He lost his seat, however, when the elections again became more restrictive since 1994. In that year, the PDPKS participated in the foundation of the "Kurdish Democratic Alliance in Syria", which included Kurdish parties that preferred cautious negotiations with the government instead of aggression. The PDPKS' conciliatory stance changed upon the outbreak of the 2004 Qamishli riots, when the party became more hostile towards the government. Despite that, Darwish still criticized other Kurdish parties who he accused of inciting the rioting, while the PDPKS as whole called on the Kurds to "extinguish the sedition". Darwish also signed the Damascus Declaration in 2005 which criticized the Assad government.

=== Syrian Civil War and work in Rojava ===
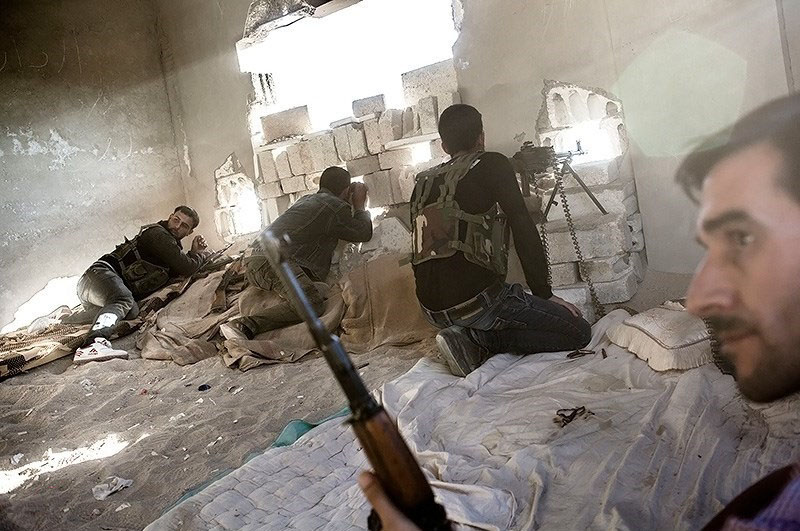
The PDPKS helped the Kurdish YPG to defeat jihadists and allied Free Syrian Army forces during the Battle of Ras al-Ayn.

After the civil uprising in Syria began in 2011, the PDPKS demanded a nationally inclusive conference to allow a transition of the country to democracy. This came not to pass, and when President Bashar al-Assad requested to meet with Darwish, he was turned down by the latter. As the conflict escalated into civil war, the PDPKS, KDPS, and PYD attempted to extend their influence in the Syrian Kurdish regions. Though the PDPKS joined the KDPS in founding the Kurdish National Council (KNC) in 2011, it also allied itself with the PYD. The latter move was partially motivated by the actions of the PUK which was supportive of the PYD at the time. The PDPKS ordered its members to join the PYD-led Asayish and YPG, as well as the Kurdish Front, which was originally formed as a Kurdish unit in the Free Syrian Army. Many fighters affiliated with the PDPKS fought in the Battle of Ras al-Ayn, and were killed by mujahideen and allied Free Syrian Army militants. The leader of the PDPKS party bureau Abdul Wahab Kassem, whose brother was one of the dead, commented that the "Free Syrian Army is not really free. In reality, it follows the Turkish policy, which wants to prevent Kurdish self-determination in Syria". (Note: Translated from German; in the original this reads: "Die Freie Syrische Armee ist nicht wirklich frei. Sie gehorcht lediglich der türkischen Politik, die eine kurdische Selbstorganisation auch in Syrien verhindern möchte.")

On 12 June 2013, Adnan Sheikh Muhammad, a member of the PDPKS who was also a member of the Kurdish Front Brigade and a representative of the Kurdish Supreme Committee in the Raqqa civil council, was killed by a Syrian Air Force airstrike in Raqqa.

Serious tensions emerged with the PYD, however, in the wake of an incident in Amuda on 27 June 2013, when YPG fighters killed six civilians. From then on, PDPKS members left the pro-PYD militias, and the party began to cooperate more closely with the KDPS, for example supporting the KNC's decision to join the (anti-PYD) National Coalition for Syrian Revolutionary and Opposition Forces. The PDPKS also began to distance itself from the PUK, which was still friendly with the PYD but also politically weakened at the time. In late 2013, the PDPKS rejected the declaration of the autonomous region of Rojava by the PYD as "unilateral solution[] in isolation from the national forces", and claimed that the new canton system was completely controlled by the PYD-led TEV-DEM organization. Darwish represented the KNC during the Geneva II Conference on Syria in early 2014.

In course of 2014 and early 2015, however, the old tensions between the PDPKS and the KDPS remerged. As result, the PDPKS eventually left the KNC on 3 July 2015, as the party's leadership accused the other factions within the coalition of working against them. In mid-2016, the PDPKS participated in protests against the rebel shelling of YPG-held Sheikh Maqsood as well as Turkish attacks on Nusaybin, and for the reconciliation of the KNC and PYD. Over time, the PDPKS became more hostile towards the KNC, and it again shifted closer to the PYD as well as the Syrian government. In January 2017, Darwish said that Bashar al-Assad was still the legitimate Syrian President, and lamented that Assad's government had a more positive position towards the Syrian Kurds than the Syrian opposition. The Asayish closed three offices of the PDPKS in Al-Hasakah Governorate in March 2017 on the basis that they were operated without a proper license, though opponents of the PYD saw the closure as political move. The PDPKS itself condemned the closure as "arbitrary"; after the party contacted the local authorities for licenses, the offices were allowed to reopen.

Kurdish Voice of America report about the opening of a PDPKS office at Kobanî in 2019.

When the Syrian National Coalition declared the YPG a terrorist group in July, Abd al-Hamid Darwish strongly rejected this move. According to him, although the YPG "undoubtedly made mistakes here and there", it had not carried out any ethnic cleansings and on the contrary "made great sacrifices" to protect Syrians of all ethnicities from ISIL. Furthermore, the PDPKS was among the Syrian Kurdish parties that condemned the Turkish airstrikes of April 2017 against PKK affiliates, including the YPG, in Syria and Iraq. Following the death of Jalal Talabani on 3 October 2017, hundreds of PDPKS members gathered in Qamishli to offer their condolences. A few weeks later, Abd al-Hamid Darwish took part in a meeting between the Syrian government, the YPG and several parties of the Syrian Democratic Council at the Russian Khmeimim airbase in Latakia Governorate.

In January 2018, the PDPKS stated its opposition to the Turkish-led invasion of Afrin, and urged all involved parties to stop fighting. It left the Sochi peace talks of the same month to protest against the Russian support for the Turkish operation. Over the next two years, the PDPKS continued to call for dialogue between the different Kurdish parties of Syria. It supported a French initiative to facilitate a reapproachment between the PYD and the KDP, though these efforts failed. In contrast, the party regarded talks between the northeastern administration with the Syrian government of 2019 with scepticism. The party's members argued that the government had shown little readiness for compromise, and that the talks only involved PYD representatives, meaning that any result would exclude other parties such as the PDPKS and thus monopolize influence in the PYD's hands. The PDPKS' Women's Organization also appealed the United Nations, and relief agencies to send aid to those affected by widespread crop fires in northern and eastern Syria in 2019. In October 2019, the party's long-time leader Darwish died.

In 2020, the PDPKS and the Yekiti Kurdistan Party condemned abuses committed by Turkish-backed authorities and groups in Afrin. In 2021, the PDPKS and the Kurdish Democratic Unity Party called on the international community to stop Turkey from repeatedly cutting the water supply for northeastern Syria.

== Ideology ==
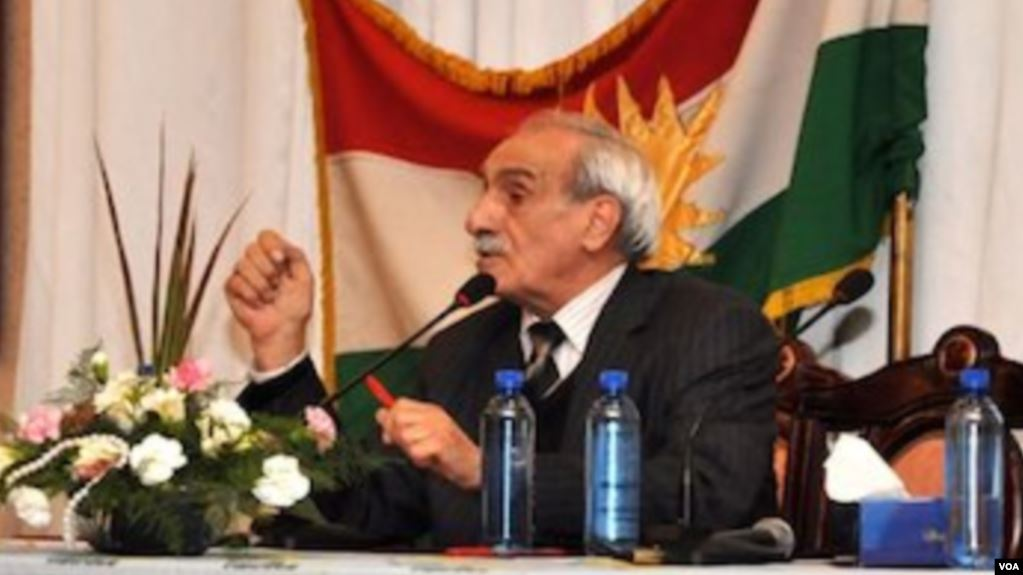
Long-time PDPKS Secretary-General Abd al-Hamid Darwish, c. 2014

Since its foundation, the Kurdish Democratic Progressive Party has defined itself through its generally moderate ideological position, adopting both centre-left to centre-right politics, while leaning more to the former than the latter. When Abd al-Hamid Darwish was still in the KDPS, he espoused the modernist Kurdish nationalism as promoted by Nûredin Zaza, thus belonging to the left camp of the KDPS. However, as the more conservative elements left the KDPS, and the whole party generally drifted left, Darwish found himself as head of the KDPS' right wing, which did not approve of the other party members' populist Marxist communism. Thus, when Darwish's faction seceded in 1965, it was essentially a centre-left group mostly composed of progressive members of the urban middle class and rural upper class. As result, the PDPKS is considered part of the "Kurdish Right", although some observers have also considered it socialist. Since its foundation, the PDPKS generally supports democracy, gender equality, and separation of religion and state.

Just like its ideological position in general could be defined as moderate, the PDPKS' view on Kurdish nationalism and self-rule in Syria has for most its history been cautious. The party usually only called for the realization of the "cultural, political, and social rights" of Kurds (and minorities in general) in Syria instead of autonomy. In addition, the party avoided referring to Kurds as "national group". In hopes of preventing open conflict, the PDPKS generally maintained channels with the Syrian government, was critical of aggressive opposition parties, and denounced the PYD's attempts to establish Rojava as de facto autonomous region in 2013. Since then, however, the party has increasingly adopted a more staunch Kurdish nationalism, and was openly calling for Kurdish self-rule in Syria by 2017.

In contrast to other Kurdish parties in Syria which tended to fracture, the PDPKS maintained relatively high cohesion under the long-time leadership of Abd al-Hamid Darwish.

== See also ==
- List of political parties in Rojava
