= Kurdish Democratic Political Union =

- Yekîtiya Siyasî ya Demokrata Kurd
- Merged into: Kurdistan Democratic Party of Syria
- Formation: 15 December 2012
- Founded at: Qamishli, Syrian Kurdistan
- Dissolved: April 2014
- Region served: Syrian Kurdistan
- Secessions: Kurdish Union Party in Syria (PYKS) in 2013

The Kurdish Democratic Political Union (Kurdish: Yekîtiya Siyasî ya Demokrata Kurd, Arabic: الإتحاد السياسي الديمقراطي الكوردي), or KDPU was a Syrian Kurdish alliance linked to Iraqi Kurdish president Massoud Barzani's Kurdistan Democratic Party (KDP).

Founded in December 2012 in Qamishli, it was aimed at forming a new party to rival the dominant role of the Democratic Union Party (PYD) in governing the de facto independent Syrian Kurdish region of Rojava. After one of the parties had broken apart in 2013, the alliance dissolved in April 2014 with the remaining parties merging into the Kurdistan Democratic Party of Syria (KDP-S).

== History ==
=== Establishment ===
The Kurdish Democratic Political Union was established on 15 December 2012, when approx. 1500 people joined a founding ceremony in the Syrian Kurdish town of Qamishli. It consisted of four parties:

- the Kurdistan Democratic Party of Syria (KDP-S),
- the two branches of the Kurdish Freedom Party in Syria (Partiya Azadî ya Kurdî li Sûriyê, or Azadî, led by Mustafa Khidr Oso and Mustafa Juma),
- and the Kurdish Union Party of Syria (Partiya Yekîtî ya Kurdî li Sûriyê, or PYKS).

The alliance was formed by four parties discontent with the perceived weakness of the Kurdish National Council as a "subgroup" within the council to foster unity.

=== Clashes with the PYD ===
The militia it formed clashed with the Popular Protection Units (YPG), a militia controlled by the Democratic Union Party (PYD), in April 2013. The alliance currently claims to have 1,500 fighters in Syria, with the Kurdistan Regional Government training troops in Iraq that will eventually controlled by the alliance. The two Freedom parties and the Kurdistani United Party (headed by Abdulbasit Hemo) would merge into the Kurdistan Democratic Party of Syria.

On 1 March 2014, the PYD-linked Asayish did not allow members of the alliance to cross into Iraq to conduct a meeting in Erbil.

=== Dissolution ===
From its very beginning, the alliance was weakened by internal power struggles. While ostensibly formed with the intent of an equitable merger between the parties, the stronger KDP-S was accused of using its political clout and support from the Iraqi Kurdistan Regional Government trying to subsume all other parties. Only KDP-S members were allowed to become part of the small militia, raising allegations that the KDP-S is behaving in a similar way to how the PYD monopolizes control on the YPG.

As a result, the Yekîtî party abandoned the alliance in 2013. In early April 2014, the Azadi Party, along with three other parties, merged into the KDP-S.
