= April 2017 Turkish airstrikes in Syria and Iraq =

- Part of the Turkish involvement in the Syrian civil war, the War in Iraq (2013–2017), the Rojava conflict, and the Kurdistan Workers' Party insurgency (2015–2025)
- Type: Airstrike
- Location: Al-Malikiyah District, al-Hasakah Governorate, Syria; Mount Sinjar, Nineveh Governorate, Iraq
- Commanded by: General Staff of the Republic of Turkey
- Target: People's Protection Units; Women's Protection Units; Sinjar Resistance Units; Êzîdxan Women's Units; Kurdistan Workers' Party; People's Defence Forces; Free Women's Units
- Date: 25 April 2017; 02:00 EEST (UTC+03:00)
- Executed by: (Turkey) Turkish Air Force
- Casualties: 70 killed (per Turkey): 16 YPG fighters; 12 YPJ fighters; 5 Peshmerga soldiers; 20 YPG fighters injured

In the early morning of 25 April 2017, the Turkish Air Force conducted multiple airstrikes against media centers and headquarters of the People's Protection Units (YPG) and the Women's Protection Units (YPJ) in northeastern Syria, and against positions of the Sinjar Resistance Units (YBŞ) on Mount Sinjar, northwestern Iraq. The airstrikes killed 20 YPG and YPJ fighters in Syria in addition to five Peshmerga soldiers in Iraq.

== Attacks ==
The attacks were authorized by the General Staff of the Republic of Turkey, who stated that the bombings targeted the Kurdistan Workers' Party (PKK) and were attempts to prevent the PKK from "sending terrorists, arms, ammunition and explosives" to Turkey. At around 2 a.m. EEST, Turkish planes conducted several airstrikes on YPG and YPJ positions atop Mount Qarachok, near the town of al-Malikiyah. The targets of the airstrikes were a YPG media center, a radio station, a telecommunications facility, and military bases. The airstrikes killed 12 YPJ and 8 YPG fighters and injured 18 more.

At around 2:30 a.m., Turkish airstrikes hit reported PKK positions atop Mount Sinjar. The airstrikes hit a Peshmerga communications tower and killed 5 Peshmerga soldiers and injured 9 more. Per the mayor of Sinjar city, no casualties were reported among the PKK.

== Turkish response ==
Recep Tayyip Erdoğan, the President of Turkey, stated that "We are obliged to take measures. We must take steps" after the airstrikes. Turkey stated to have contacted the United States, Russia, and Masoud Barzani, President of Iraqi Kurdistan, prior to the attacks. In response to the airstrike on a Peshmerga position which killed 5 of their soldiers, Erdoğan stated that it was "absolutely not an operation against [them]."

== Reactions ==
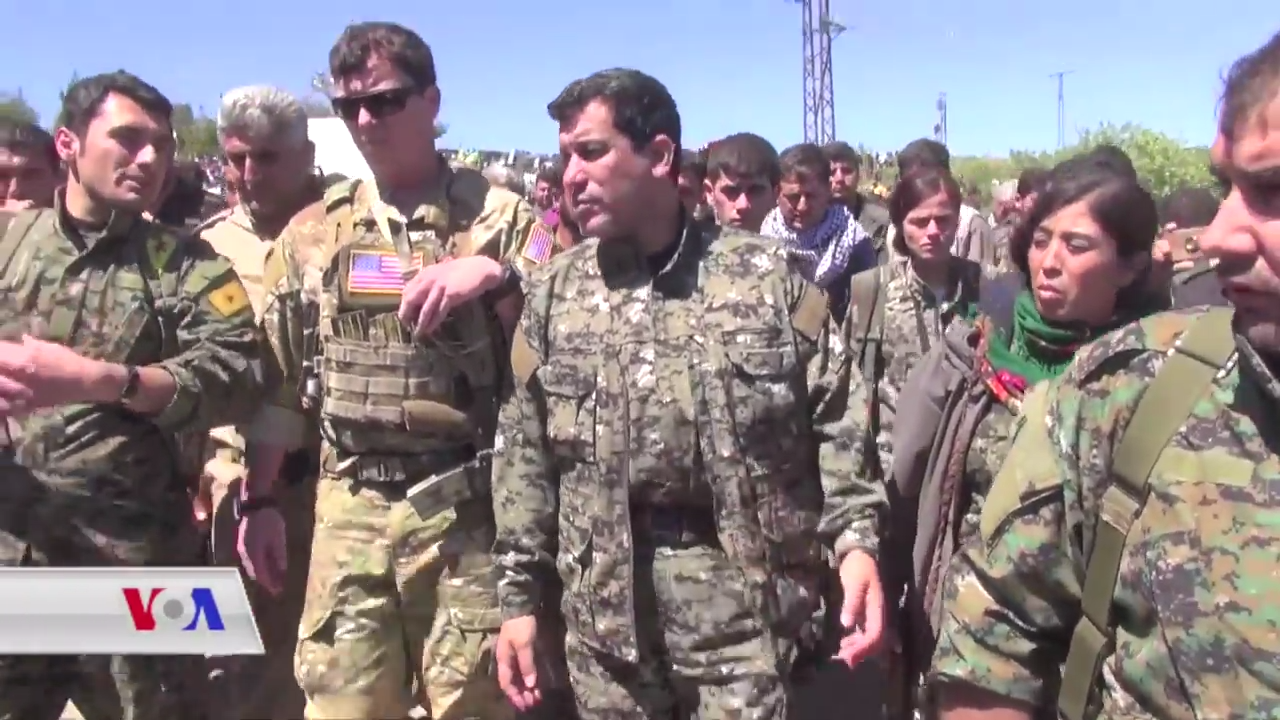
A US military official and YPG commanders tour the area hit by the airstrikes

- United States: Mark Toner, the spokesman of the State Department, said that the U.S. was "very concerned, deeply concerned" about the airstrikes, which had been conducted without approval of the U.S. and the US-led coalition. He also said that the U.S. had "expressed those concerns to the government of Turkey directly." According to officials from the United States Central Command, the coordination center based in Qatar turned down the Turkish requests to conduct the airstrikes. After the airstrikes, US military officials visited the area in northeastern Syria hit by the attacks and met with the YPG to "de-escalate tensions" as they were "monitoring the developments".
- Iraq: The Iraqi Foreign Ministry condemned the attacks in Sinjar as a violation of Iraqi sovereignty. The ministry stated that "any operation that is carried out by the Turkish government without any coordination with the Iraqi government is totally rejected.
  - Iraqi Kurdistan: A statement by the Kurdistan Regional Government called the airstrikes in Sinjar "painful and unacceptable". However, the KRG also called on the PKK to withdraw from Sinjar.
- Syria: The Foreign and Expatriates Ministry of Syria stated: "Syria denounces in the strongest of terms the blatant aggression carried out by Erdogan's regime on Syrian territory on Tuesday April 25th, 2017, when Turkish warplanes shelled positions in northeast Syria, claiming the lives of scores of innocent Syrian civilians."
  - Democratic Federation of Northern Syria (DFNS): The airstrikes were condemned by TEV-DEM, the governing coalition of the DFNS, including the PYD. Several opposition parties in the DFNS also denounced the attacks, such as the KDPS/PDKS, the PDPKS, and the PYDKS. On 30 April, the Afrin branch of the KNC (the most prominent opposition group in the DFNS) released a statement condemning the airstrikes and other Turkish attacks in northern Syria. "We condemn and denounce the Turkish aggression and demand the government of Ankara to stop the [attacks] immediately, we also ask PYD (Democratic Union Party) authorities to change its approach and authoritarian behavior and move towards a national and responsible approach to serve the unity of the Kurds and the Kurdish project in the face of challenges and serious risks in the present time and in the future for our Kurdish people", the council stated.

== Aftermath ==
US Army Stryker armored vehicles drive through Qamishli and head to the border

On 26 April, the Turkish Army targeted YPG positions with artillery near the border town of al-Darbasiyah in northeastern Hasaka. Heavy clashes then erupted between the YPG and the Turkish Army on the border, resulting in multiple casualties. Meanwhile, clashes also broke out between the YPG and the Turkish Army on the western border near Afrin. Border clashes continued for the next two days, with border outposts being targeted from both sides which resulted in dozens of casualties.

On 28 April, Turkish forces removed a part of the Turkey–Syria barrier north of Amuda and targeted villages north of the city with artillery. On the same day, US troops, including 8 commanders, visited Derbassiye and other areas where the fighting took place. On 29 April, more US troops in armoured personnel carriers arrived on the Syrian side of the border.

== See also ==
- Sinjar clashes (2017)
- Turkish military intervention in Syria
- Operation Martyr Yalçın
