= Kurdistan Democratic Party (disambiguation) =

Kurdistan Democratic Party may refer to a number of Kurdish political parties:

== Iraq ==
- Kurdistan Democratic Party (Iraq) (KDP), an Iraqi Kurdish political party led by Massoud Barzani, previously involved in two armed insurgencies for Kurdish Independence in Iraq
- Kurdistan Democratic Party – Progressive Front, a defunct political party in Iraq

== Iran ==
- Kurdistan Democratic Party (Iran) (KDP-IRAN), an Iranian Kurdish political party
- Kurdistan Democratic Party of Iran (KDP-I), a Kurdish political party with its armed wing being involved in the Iranian Revolution and an armed insurgency against the Islamic Regime in Iran

== Lebanon ==
- Kurdish Democratic Party (Lebanon) (KDP-L), a Kurdish political party

== Turkey ==
- Kurdistan Democratic Party/North (PDK/Bakur), a Kurdish militant group involved in an armed insurgency for Kurdish independence in Turkey
- Kurdistan Democratic Party of Turkey (PDK-T; TKDP), unregistered Kurdish party in Turkey founded in 2014

== Syria ==
- Kurdistan Democratic Party of Syria (KDP-S), a banned Kurdish political party in Syria
- Kurdish Democratic Progressive Party (PDPKS), a banned Kurdish political party in Syria which broke away from the KDP–S

== Armenia ==
- Kurdistan Democratic Party of Armenia, a Kurdish political party in Armenia
