= Salih Muslim =

Syrian Kurdish leader (1951–2026)

- صالح مسلم
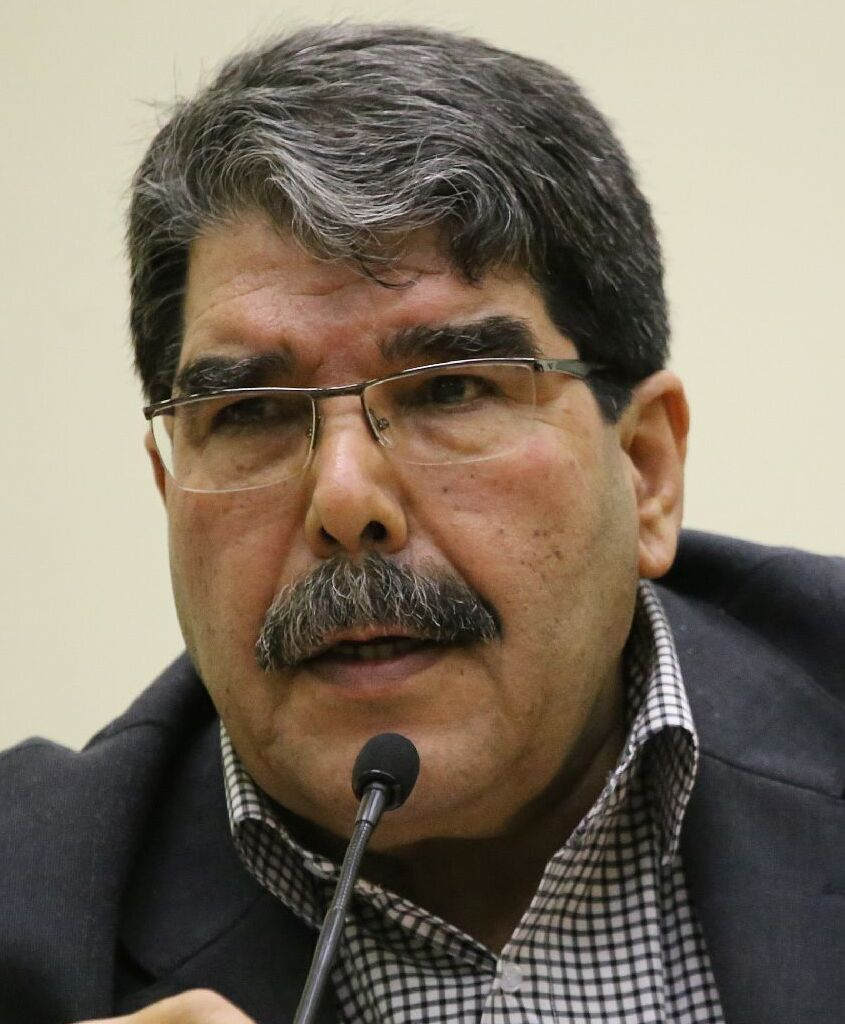
- Muslim in 2014

Chairman of the Democratic Union Party
- In office 20 June 2022 – 22 September 2024 Serving with Asya Abdullah (2022–2024)
- Preceded by: Anwar Muslim; Aysha Hisso
- Succeeded by: Perwîn Yûsif; Xerîb Hiso
- In office 2010 – September 2017 Serving with Asya Abdullah (2012–2017)
- Preceded by: Fuat Omar
- Succeeded by: Shahoz Hassan; Aysha Hisso

Personal details
- Born: Salih Muslim Muhammad; 3 March 1951 Kobanî, Aleppo Governorate, Syria
- Died: 11 March 2026 (aged 75) Erbil, Kurdistan Region, Iraq
- Resting place: Martyr Dicle Cemetery, Kobanî
- Party: Democratic Union Party (PYD) (2003–2026)
- Other political affiliations: Kurdistan Democratic Party of Syria (1998–2003)
- Spouse: Ayşe Efendi
- Children: 5 (Note: One deceased.)
- Education: Istanbul Technical University
- Occupation: Chemical engineer, politician
- Nickname: Father of the Country (Kurmanji Kurdish: Bavê Welat)

Salih Muslim Muhammad (Kurmanji Kurdish: Salih Muslim Mihemed; Arabic: صالح مسلم محمد, romanized: Ṣāliḥ Muslim Muḥammad; 3 March 1951 – 11 March 2026) was a Syrian Kurdish politician. He served as the co-chairman of the Democratic Union Party (PYD), the main party of the Democratic Autonomous Administration of North and East Syria (DAANES), in whose establishment he played a key role. As the deputy coordinator of the National Coordination Committee for Democratic Change, he was the most prominent Kurdish representative for much of the Syrian civil war.

== Political career ==
=== Early political activities ===
Muslim first became involved with the Kurdish nationalist movement during the 1970s when he was studying engineering at Istanbul Technical University after becoming influenced by Mustafa Barzani's ongoing fight against the Iraqi government, the failure of which spurred him into becoming more active.

He paid a visit to Abdullah Öcalan, the leader of the Kurdistan Workers' Party, in 1983. After his return to Syria, he met several times with Öcalan, who was based in the country until October 1998.

In 1998, Muslim joined the Kurdistan Democratic Party of Syria (KDP-S), the Syrian branch of the Iraqi Kurdistan Democratic Party (KDP). He was also active in an early version of the Syrian Democratic Assembly, led by Kurds with Arab participation, until it was disbanded in 2002 following the end of the Damascus Spring. He left the KDP-S in 2003 after becoming disillusioned by the party's failure to accomplish its objectives.

=== Democratic Union Party (PYD) ===
2013 VOA report about the PYD, including an interview with Salih Muslim

In 2003, Muslim joined the newly formed Democratic Union Party (PYD), becoming a member of its executive council. (Note: According to some sources, he was among the party's founders.) Following his letter to Syrian president Bashar al-Assad in reaction to the Qamishli massacre of March 2004, he was arrested and imprisoned for seven months. He was held in jail for two to three months each year until 2010.

He was elected as party president (serok) in 2010. After he and his wife Ayşe Efendi were imprisoned again, he fled to a Patriotic Union of Kurdistan (PUK) camp in the Gare mountains in Iraq's northernmost Duhok Governorate in 2010. Following the start of the Syrian Civil War, he returned to Qamishli in March or April 2011 with up to 2,000 PKK guerrilla fighters by permission of the Assad government, and oversaw the rise of the PYD as a force opposed to Turkish influence in Syria.

Under Muslim's chairmanship, the PYD became the leading political party and actor in the emergence of the Autonomous Administration of North and East Syria. In June 2011, he was among the co-founders of the National Coordination Committee for Democratic Change (NCC), a left-wing coalition of the Syrian opposition, and became its deputy coordinator. At the same time, he worked against the Syrian National Council, its successor the National Coalition of Syrian Revolutionary and Opposition Forces, and the allied Kurdish National Council due to their backing by Turkey and other external sponsors.

After the PYD introduced the co-chair system at its fifth congress in June 2012, the re-elected Muslim shared his party leadership duties with Asya Abdullah. His primary role, however, was that of an international spokesman and diplomatic representative of the Syrian Kurdish cause. He met with the Iraqi prime minister, Nouri al-Maliki, as a member of NCC's delegation to Baghdad in December 2012. In July 2013, during the Kurdish-Turkish peace process, he was invited to Istanbul to negotiate with the Turkish government of Recep Tayyip Erdoğan about the future of Syria, returning on three more occasions for talks between then and October 2014. He successfully negotiated the passage of peshmerga units from the Kurdistan Region of Iraq via Turkey to the besieged Kobani in Syria with Turkey's prime minister Ahmet Davutoğlu and National Intelligence Organization (MİT) director Hakan Fidan. (Note: According to one source's assessment, the Turkish side only agreed in October 2014 to the reinforcement of Kobani by successive KRG peshmerga detachments, which took place between November 2014 and April 2015, in order to prevent further airdrops of weapons, ammunition and medical supplies from the Patriotic Union of Kurdistan into Kobani by the United States.) He also visited Tehran alongside KDP-S leader Abdulhakim Bashar for talks with the Iranian government in August 2013.

He was present in Geneva during the run-up to the United Nations-sponsored peace talks on Syria at the turn of January 2016, but failed to receive invitation to participate due to strong objections from the mainstream Syrian opposition's High Negotiations Committee and its Saudi and Turkish backers.

=== TEV-DEM foreign relations ===
Following the election of new co-chairs at the 7th congress of the PYD in northern Syria, Muslim assumed the role of the head of foreign relations for the Movement for a Democratic Society (TEV-DEM) coalition of the Democratic Federation of Northern Syria. In this capacity, he stressed the message that "the Kurdish problem in Turkey and the Kurdish problem in Syria are two separate issues and will be resolved separately. To solve our problem in Syria, we have to sit down and talk with our fellow Syrians, with Arabs, Turkmens and others. Not with Turkey."

He was re-elected co-chairman of the PYD alongside Asya Abdullah on 20 June 2022 during the party's 9th congress. In September 2024, he stepped down following the election of new co-chairs at the 10th congress and became a member of the PYD's Co-Presidential Council.

Following the military offensive by the Syrian transitional government against the Democratic Autonomous Administration of North and East Syria in January 2026, he denounced the Paris meeting between the STG, Israel, Turkey and several Arab countries under American auspices, where the operation had been agreed, as the "second February 15 conspiracy" in a reference to the abduction of Abdullah Öcalan in 1999.

== Personal life and death ==
Muslim, a citizen of Syria, was born on 3 March 1951 in the village of Sheran (Seyran) near Kobani to a Sunni Kurdish family. After completing his secondary education in Syria, he studied at the Chemical Engineering faculty of Istanbul Technical University from 1970, graduating in 1977. After a brief stint in London, he worked in Saudi Arabia as an engineer between 1978 and 1990, before opening an engineering office in Aleppo in 1993.

According to Muslim himself, he had permission to reside in Finland.

Muslim was fluent in Kurdish, English, Arabic and Turkish.

On 9 October 2013, Salih Muslim's son Shervan, a fighter in the People's Protection Units (YPG), was killed west of Tell Abyad during clashes with the Islamic State of Iraq and the Levant. He was buried in the family's hometown of Kobanê in a public funeral which thousands of people attended. After coming to Syria from western Europe for the ceremony, Muslim was prevented by the Kurdistan Democratic Party from crossing the border back into Iraq at Semalka to travel to a conference on Kurdish issues in Washington, DC, due to the ongoing conflict between the PYD and the KDP-backed Kurdish National Council.

His elder brother Mustafa (1940–2021) was an Islamic scholar who lived in exile in Turkey from 2011, co-founded the private Ez-Zehra University in Gaziantep and served as its rector from 2014. Having hosted a programme on the state-owned TRT Kurdî television channel and lectured in the Turkish-occupied Jarabulus and al-Bab following the Operation Euphrates Shield, Mustafa was a critic of Muslim's policies and denounced PYD's rule in Afrin Canton as "communism".

Muslim died at the Chaldean Catholic Church–run Meryamana Hospital in the Ankawa suburb of Erbil, Iraq, on 11 March 2026, while receiving treatment for kidney failure. He was 75. He was buried at the Martyr Dicle Cemetery in Kobani following a ceremony in Qamishli on 13 March.

== Relations with foreign countries ==
=== Europe ===
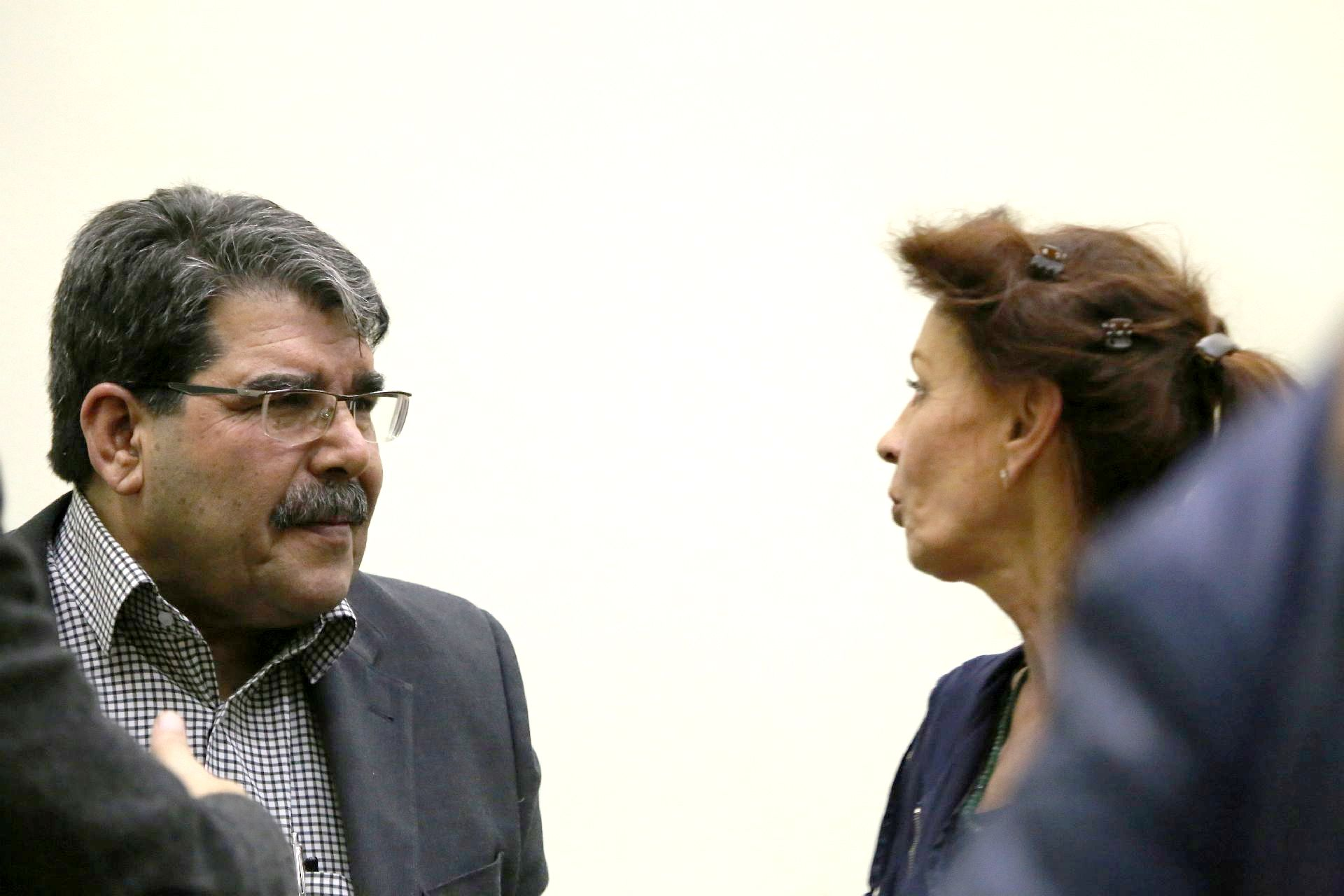
Salih Muslim, co-chairman of the PYD, with Ulla Jelpke at the Rosa Luxemburg Foundation in Berlin

Muslim was a familiar face in European capitals where he was hosted by senior officials. He was a frequent guest and speaker at European political institutions and events, inter alia in September 2016 invited to address the European Parliament.

In August 2013, Muslim criticised the European Union for allegedly failing to provide humanitarian aid to the Syrian Kurds and to condemn atrocities against Kurdish civilians in the Syrian war.

Addressing thousands during the Newroz celebration in Frankfurt, Germany, on 18 March 2017, Muslim said that "there is a huge resistance despite all the attacks. Nobody should doubt that the success and victory will be ours." Muslim criticised Germany for banning Kurdish symbols, saying that "Germany should have banned the flags of Turkey and terrorist groups instead of our flags and symbols because we are fighting in the Middle East not for ourselves alone, we are fighting ISIS and terrorism for all humanity. Our resistance is for Europe, for the West and for all humanity."

=== Iran ===
Muslim visited Iran on several occasions between 2012 and 2015. During their Tehran visit in August 2013, Muslim and the rival Syrian Kurdish leader Abdulhakim Bashar of KDP-S were asked by their Iranian interlocutors to support Bashar al-Assad's government. In 2016, Abdulhakim Bashar accused the PYD, led by Muslim, of working for Iran, while Muslim alleged that Iran was "making obstacles for Kurdish rights in Syria" and called on Iranian Kurds to fight for their rights following the example of their Syrian compatriots.

=== Iraq ===
Muslim was seen as a rival for leadership in the Kurdish movement by the president of the Kurdistan Region of Iraq Masoud Barzani.

Muslim boycotted the Kurdish National Council conference hosted by Barzani in Erbil in January 2012 on account of Barzani's ties to Turkey.

On his departure to Istanbul in July 2013, Muslim stated that the PYD had involved both of the main Iraqi Kurdish parties, the Kurdistan Democratic Party (KDP) and the Patriotic Union of Kurdistan (PUK), in discussions of the initial plan for a Syrian Kurdish interim government. In December 2014, he acknowledged the Turkey-backed Barzani's "extensive pressure", albeit unsuccessful, on Turkey to allow the passage of YPG troops to the besieged Kobani, after his own requests were turned down.

=== Russia ===
Muslim maintained diplomatic relations with Russia and visited Moscow between 2012 and 2015, which was interpreted by some analysts as an effort to keep the PYD's external relations balanced.

=== Saudi Arabia ===
During the Qatar diplomatic crisis in 2017, Muslim gave an interview to Al Riyadh in which he alleged the existence of an Iranian–Qatari–Turkish pact against the Syrian Kurds, describing it as "dangerous for all the people of the Middle East, and for all the humanity", in an apparent attempt to seek Saudi backing for Kurdish participation in the Syrian peace process.

=== Turkey ===
Between 2012 and 2015, Muslim was Ankara's top interlocutor within the PYD's Syrian Kurdish movement, which was inspired by former Kurdistan Workers' Party (PKK) leader Abdullah Ocalan. During an interview with BBC News reporter Orla Guerin in August 2012, Muslim denied any "operational links" to the PKK. His initial meetings with Turkish officials were secret. Following the start of the 2013–2015 PKK–Turkey peace process, Turkey received Salih Muslim for talks in 2013 and in 2014, even entertaining the idea of opening a Rojava representation office in Ankara "if it's suitable with Ankara's policies." According to some high-ranking Turkish officials, Muslim had ties to Turkish intelligence services from his student days in Istanbul in the 1970s until 2015, when he was introduced by Turkey to representatives of the United States. However, following the June 2015 AKP electoral loss in Turkey, largely due to the rise of the pro-Kurdish Peoples' Democratic Party (HDP), the peace process collapsed in July 2015, drastically changing the AKP attitude to the Kurdish issue. According to the pro-administration Daily Sabah, "As a reconciliation process with the PKK was ongoing between 2012 and 2015, Ankara tried to persuade the PYD to drop its hostile attitude toward Turkey, open cooperation channels and to end its affiliations with the Bashar Assad regime. As the PKK unilaterally resumed armed attacks in July 2015, the PYD and its armed wing, the People's Protection Units (YPG), provided the PKK with militants, explosives, arms and ammunition. Simultaneous armed revolts broke out in almost all towns and cities bordering Syria; whereas terrorists trained in northern Syria staged suicide attacks in Turkish cities." The Turkish government allegedly sought to assassinate Muslim. In late 2016, Turkey issued an arrest warrant for Salih Muslim in a move considered putting Ankara on a collision course with its Western allies. According to some analysts who cited the International Crisis Group for their claims, Muslim was replaced as PYD co-chair due to his more "pragmatic" attitude towards seeking an agreement with Turkey. On 14 February 2018, two days after Muslim was put on the "most wanted terrorists" list by the Turkish Interior Ministry and had a bounty of 4 million Turkish lira (about US$1.5 million at the time) placed on his head, he held a press conference at the seat of European Union institutions in Brussels. He was briefly detained at Turkey's request on 25 February 2018 in Prague, the capital of the Czech Republic, but was released two days later, drawing angry protests from Turkey. On 17 March 2018, the Czech authorities dismissed Turkey's request.

In a February 2018 interview, Muslim said that "when I look back, I conclude that Turkey was never sincere about wanting to make peace with the Kurds. Had Turkey reached out to the Kurds, worked with the Kurds, it would have become the most powerful country in the Middle East."

== Sources ==
- Allsopp, Harriet; van Wilgenburg, Wladimir (2019). The Kurds of Northern Syria: Governance, Diversity and Conflicts. London: I. B. Tauris. ISBN 978-1-7883-1483-1.
- Gunter, Michael M. (2018). Historical Dictionary of the Kurds (3rd ed.). Lanham, MD: Rowman & Littlefield. p. 22. ISBN 9781538110492.
- Gunter, Michael M. (2014). Out of Nowhere: The Kurds of Syria in Peace and War. London: C. Hurst & Co. ISBN 978-1-84904-435-6.
- Gunter, Michael M.; Yavuz, M. Hakan (2020). "The October 2019 Turkish Incursion into Kurdish Syria: Its Background & Broader Implications". Middle East Policy. 27 (1): 86–101. doi:10.1111/mepo.12476. ISSN 1475-4967. S2CID 219004728.
- Kaválek, Tomáš; Mareš, Miroslav (2018). "PKK's Friends and Foes in the Middle East Since 1999" (PDF). Central European Journal of International and Security Studies. 12 (2): 100–129.
- Thornton, Rod (2015). "Problems with the Kurds as proxies against Islamic State: insights from the siege of Kobane". Small Wars & Insurgencies. 26 (6): 865–885. doi:10.1080/09592318.2015.1095844.
