= Peshmerga Roj =

Kurdish militia from Syria

- پێشمەرگەی ڕۆژ
- Emblem of the Peshmerga Roj
- Leader: Ibrahim Biro
- Country: Iraq
- Allegiance: Kurdistan Regional Government
- Headquarters: Erbil, Kurdistan Region
- Active regions: Kurdistan Region, Autonomous Administration of North and East Syria, Syria
- Ideology: Kurdish nationalism Republicanism; Secularism; Atlanticism; Barzanism; Anti-communism
- Size: 5,000+ (2018, self-claim)
- Part of: ENKS: KDP-S
- Wars: Rojava Revolution; 2017 Sinjar clashes

Peshmerga Roj (Kurdish: پێشمەرگێ ڕۆژ, romanized: Pêşmergê Roj), also known as the Rojava Peshmerga (Kurdish: پێشمەرگێ ڕۆژئاڤا, romanized: Pêşmergê Rojava), or the Roj Army (Kurdish: لەشکرێ ڕۆژ, romanized: Leşkirê Roj) are the military wing of the KDP-S, Kurdish National Council and KRG in Syria. They are pro-KDP and take orders from President Barzani of Iraqi Kurdistan. Whilst affiliated with the Syrian KNC, they operate in Iraq and have been blocked by the Syrian Democratic Forces from operating in Syria.

== History ==
The KNC leader claimed that in response to the rising military power of the YPG and YPJ, the armed wings of the PYD, the KNC formed its own paramilitary wing, the Peshmerga Roj. According to the claims of Ibrahim Biro, the Rojava Peshmergas are mostly recruited from Syrian Kurdish refugees and Syrian Army deserters in Kurdistan Region. Trained by Peshmerga and Zeravani under Major General Bahjat Taymas, the Roj Peshmerga had a claimed strength of 3,000 fighters by June 2016 and 5,000 by December 2018. Their primary purpose has been defending Kurdish areas, and fighting the Islamic State.

== Battles ==
Between 2016 and 2018, the Rojava Peshmergas were mostly fighting ISIL in Iraq.

On 2 March 2017, there were clashes between the Rojava Peshmerga and Yazidi militias affiliated with the PKK in Sinjar resulting in the deaths of five as well as two militants affiliated to the PKK who attempted to prevent the clashes. At least four Peshmergas were also injured in the clashes.

== Conflict with other Kurdish groups ==
Due to the political tensions between the PYD and the KNC, the Peshmerga Roj have not been able to enter Rojava. During the Siege of Kobanî, the KNC offered to send 200 Peshmerga Roj fighters to support the YPG's defenses, but this offer was rejected by the PYD as they wanted all Kurdish units to fight as part of the YPG. The KNC leader has several times claimed that the YPG even blocked the Peshmerga Roj who had been trained in Iraqi Kurdistan from entering Rojava at all. Since the formation of the SDF, the YPG officials have stated that the Peshmerga Roj are welcome to join and fight under SDF command, but the KNC have rejected joining SDF, and stated that "they [the SDF] have a good relation with the Syrian regime, that's why we cannot join them." Despite their tensions with the PYD, however, the KNC has also rejected inquires of Syrian opposition groups to send the Peshmerga Roj to Azaz to defend the city against both ISIL as well as the YPG. Bahjat Taymas declared that the Peshmerga Roj "don't want to fight Kurds, only ISIS."

After the PKK called the Peshmerga Roj "mercenaries", Haji Kalo, one of Peshmerga Roj's leaders, said that "mercenaries is only applicable to the PKK, the Peshmerga Roj just wants to serve Kurdistan".

On 17 December 2018, US envoy to Syria James Franklin Jeffrey informed the press that some Rojava Peshmergas have been deployed across the Iraq–Syria border. The disputes between the PYD and the KNC, however, prevent the Peshmerga Roj from entering Rojava despite the requests from the international community. One of the main obstacles have been the KNC's links with Turkey and the fear of local people believed to be PYD-supporters that the Peshmerga Roj could be used against Rojava in future. The KNC states that the PYD oppose Peshmerga Roj because they want to maintain monopoly on power and that the PYD fears that the Peshmerga Roj could put an end to the PYD's enforcement of authoritarian rule over Kurdish areas in Syria. While described as mercenaries for Turkey by pro-PYD supporters, the Peshmerga Roj and their KNC administration in return accuse the PYD of being mercenaries for Iran and too close to Assad whose family has oppressed Kurds for half a century. They justify their links to Turkey as a geopolitical necessity if Kurds in Syria are to gain legitimate autonomy from Damascus.

== Sources ==
- Gunes, Cengiz; Lowe, Robert (2015). The Impact of the Syrian War on Kurdish Politics Across the Middle East (PDF). London: Chatham House. Archived from the original (PDF) on 9 October 2017.
