= Ibrahim Biro =

Syrian Kurdish politician (b. 1965)

Leader of the Yekiti Kurdistan Party (Syria)
- In office 29 March 2013 – 23 December 2018
- Preceded by: Ismail Hamieh
- Succeeded by: Sulaiman Oso

Leader of the Kurdish National Council
- In office 1 July 2015 – 11 December 2017
- Preceded by: Taher Safouk
- Succeeded by: Saud al-Mala

Personal details
- Born: 7 July 1965 (age 60) Amuda, Syria
- Party: Yekiti Kurdistan Party (Syria)

Ibrahim Biro (Kurdish: Ibrahîm Biro, Arabic: إبراهيم برو; born July 7, 1965) is a Syrian Kurdish politician who served as the head of the Yekiti Kurdistan Party – Syria from March 2013 until December 2018. He was born in the city of Amuda, located in Syria’s Hasakah Governorate. Biro completed his secondary education in Amuda and went on to study at the Intermediate Institute of Railways in Aleppo, graduating in 1985. He later worked as a civil servant for the Syrian Railways Corporation.

== Political activity ==
Syrian regime forces arrested BİRO in 1993 in the city of Amuda, in the province of Hasakah, as a result of his political work among the Kurdish movement in Syria. In 2009 he was again arrested by the Syrian security forces and sentenced to eight months in prison. In March 2011, when the Syrian anti-Syrian demonstrations reached northern Syria, Syrian security forces arrested "Biro" for his participation in the current demonstrations. He was sentenced to 11 months in prison and released in March 2012. He was a member of the Kurdish Shegile Party in Syria (حزب الشغيلّة الكردي) in 1982.

He was elected a member of the Central Committee of the Yekiti Kurdistan Party - Syria at his third conference in 2000 and was also elected a member of the political bureau of the Yekiti party in 2006. He was elected secretary of the party at his seventh conference in mid-March 2013, where he held the position until December 23, 2018. He served as president of the Kurdish National Council in Syria and its military wing the Peshmerga Roj, which includes 13 parties of the Syrian Kurdish parties and a number of women's and youth organizations and independent figures opposed to the Syrian regime. In 2013, he represented all the masses in the National Coalition for Syrian Revolutionary and Opposition Forces.

He was elected as secretary of the Yekiti Kurdistan Party - Syria at the 7th Congress in mid-March 2013 to 23 December 2018 through the 8th Congress of the Party.

He was elected President of the Kurdish National Council in Syria from 2015 to 11 December 2017

== Abduction and exile ==
Biro was kidnapped by the Asayish forces of the Democratic Union Party of the Syrian branch of the PKK on August 13, 2016, in the market of the city of Qamishli. He was held in an unknown location until the next day, across the Syrian border with the Kurdistan Region of Iraq. After receiving several threats from the leaders and members of the Democratic Union Party, to decide the other exiles outside Syria.
