= Asya Abdullah =

Kurdish politician (born 1971)

- آسيا عبدالله
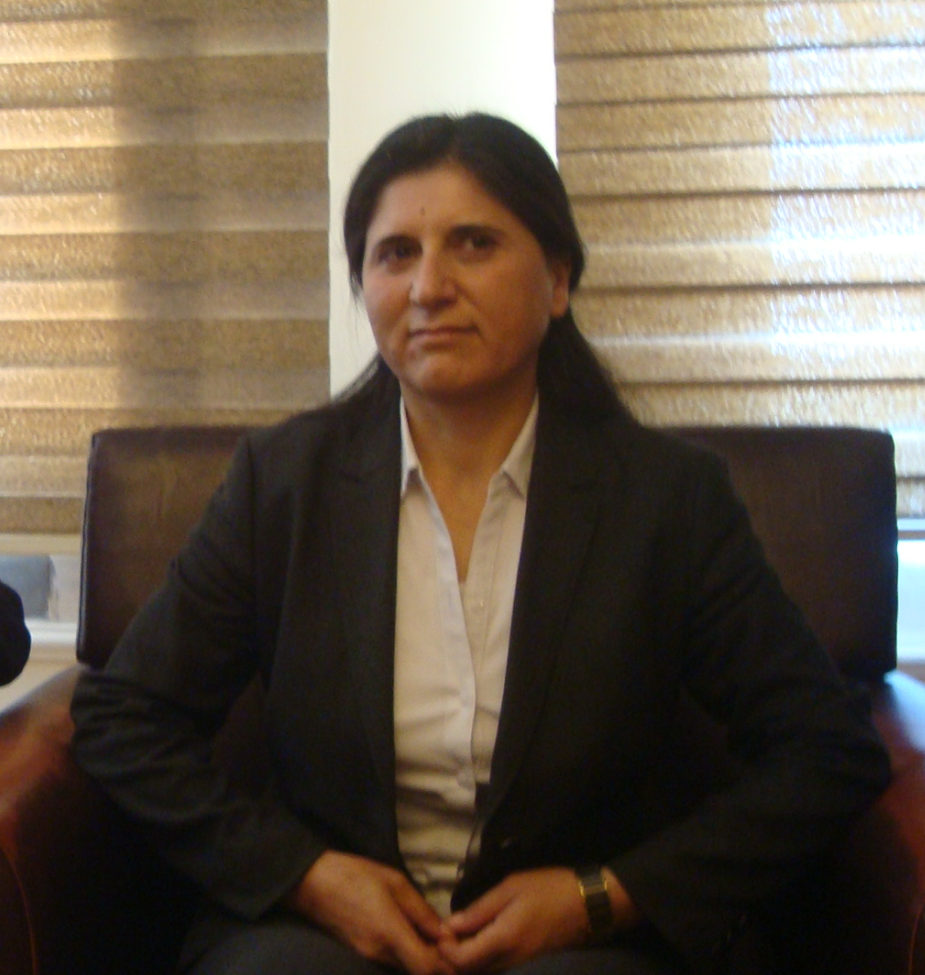
- Abdullah in 2013

Chairwoman of the Democratic Union Party
- Incumbent
- Assumed office 2022 Serving with Salih Muslim (2022–2026)
- Preceded by: Shahoz Hassan; Aysha Hisso
- In office 2010–2017 Serving with Salih Muslim (2012–2017)
- Succeeded by: Anwar Muslim; Aysha Hisso

Personal details
- Born: 1971 (age 54–55) Al-Malikiyah, Hasakah Governorate, Syria
- Party: Democratic Union Party (PYD) (2003–present)
- Profession: Politician

Asya Abdullah (Arabic: آسيا عبدالله; born 1971) is a Syrian Kurdish politician in the Autonomous Administration of North and East Syria (Rojava). Asya Abdullah is the current chairwoman of the Democratic Union Party (PYD), the former co-chair of the Movement for a Democratic Society (TEV-DEM) coalition, and serves as a senior permanent member of the Syrian Kurdistan Communities Union (KCK), serving in its upper administrative body. She has presented at numerous conferences to reach out to activists, academics and world leaders to garner support for the Kurdish political project in Rojava.

== Political career ==
=== Early political activities ===
Abdullah has served in the Kurdistan Workers' Party (PKK) for an estimated 25 years. As a member of the PKK, she was active in Iraq's Qandil and Gara areas and later in Syria.

=== Democratic Union Party (PYD) ===
In 2003 Abdullah became a founding member of the Democratic Union Party (PYD), with the goal of building grass-roots democracy through people's and women's councils. She was elected as co-chair of the PYD in June 2012 and led the party with Salih Muslim until September 2017.

As PYD co-chair, Abdullah represented Rojava in the context of the Syrian Civil War. In an interview, Abdullah declared that "No solution will be found through violence" but that "The formation of the cantons and the construction of democratic autonomy is providing an example for the peoples of the country."

In November 2016, Abdullah gave a keynote speech to the New World Summit in Oslo, describing the revolutionary "Rojava experiment". Abdullah also represented the PYD at a meeting with French President Francois Hollande in Paris in February 2015.

=== TEV-DEM ===
After leaving her position as PYD co-chair, Abdullah was appointed as co-chair of the Movement for a Democratic Society (TEV-DEM) coalition. In this capacity, Abdullah continued her activism championing the strong participation of women in the movement. During TEV-DEM's third congress, she emphasized the role of women, stating, "The purpose of TEV-DEM was to organize the people and build a moral-political society on the basis of justice, equality and the riddance of patriarchy. TEV-DEM started its efforts in the family, and organized society to emancipate women from slavery."

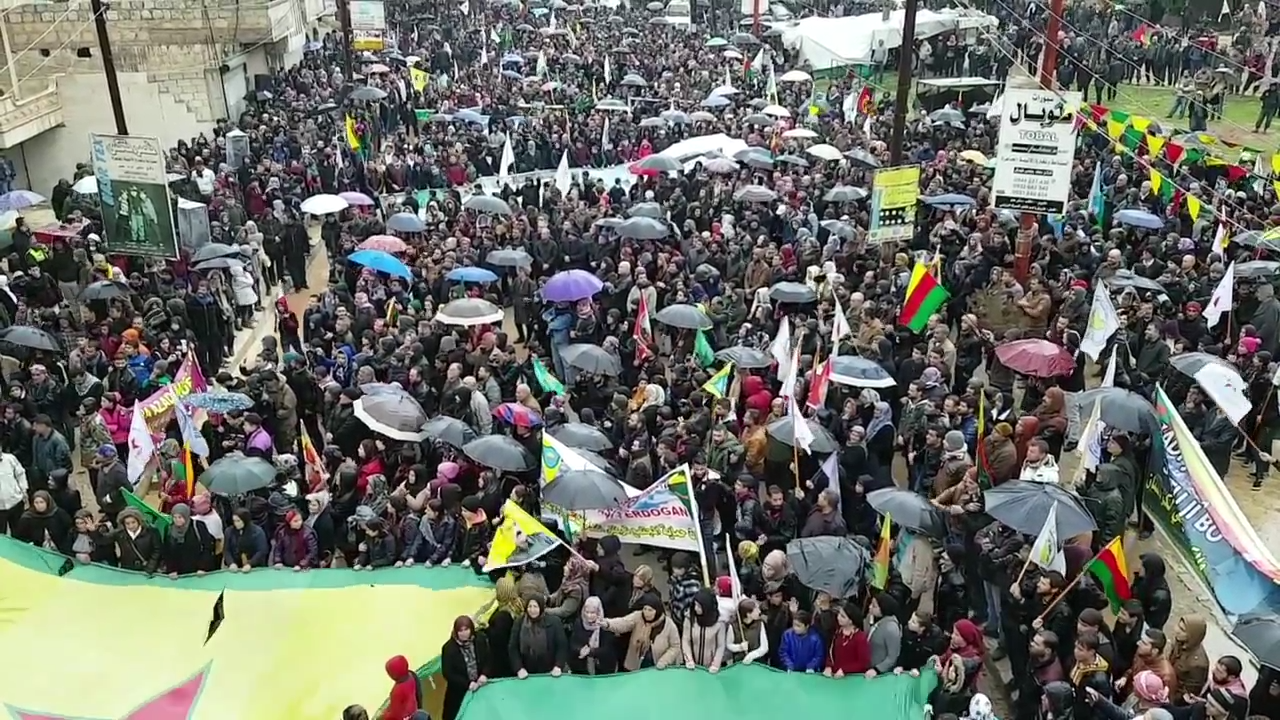
Demonstration in Afrin against Turkish military operation 2018

In early 2018 Abdullah repeatedly called for support for the YPG and YPJ resistance in Afrin, Syria which was under Turkish attack, declaring "Now the only way to stand against invasion is resistance." She strongly criticized the lack of international support, saying, "The truth of the matter is that they don't care that the Kurdish people are faced with destruction and massacres. Kurds are experiencing a genocide, and the whole world is watching. There must be pressure against the Turkish state to stop their attacks."

In March 2018, Abdullah met French President Emmanuel Macron with a delegation of leaders from Northern Syria.

Asya Abdullah served with Aldar Xelil as TEV-DEM's leader until August 2018 when they were replaced by Zelal Ceger and Gharib Hesso.

Asya was re-elected co-chairman of the PYD alongside Salih Muslim on June 20, 2022, during the party's 9th congress.

=== Kurdistan Communities Union (KCK) ===
Abdullah is a senior permanent member of the Syrian Kurdistan Communities Union (KCK), serving in its upper administrative body. She is responsible for the KCK's Syrian cantons of Afrin, Jazira and Kobanî.

== Democratic Autonomy in Rojava ==
As a Kurdish leader, Abdullah has worked tirelessly to promote and achieve democratic autonomy in Rojava. This project relies on the role of women, environmental responsibility, and a nonviolent communal alternative. It is in Rojava that the ideology of democratic confederalism which is based on the ideas of Murray Bookchin and Abdullah Öcalan is being implemented. Hundreds of neighborhood-based communes have been established across Rojava's three cantons.

=== Women ===
The role of women in Rojava is of vital importance, as Asya Abdullah writes, "How can a society be free when its women aren't free?" Notably, the current position of women in Rojava is built on decades of work against oppression. Kurdish activist Sakine Cansız, who was instrumental in developing the Kurdish women's movement, writes about the 1970s,

"The woman work wasn't easy. Some of the women wanted to fight their oppression, to educate and transform themselves, but others acted counterproductively. Actually that was to be expected, as in Kurdistan there was no precedent for a women's movement. In many places in the world, women had already been organizing to demand their rights, but in Kurdistan equality and women's liberation were foreign concepts."

Now Rojava uses the principle of dual leadership where every organization is co-led by a man and woman and women must make up at least 40 percent of all mixed gender institutions . According to Abdullah, "Even the smallest institutions of the society support the development of strong women's solidarity. In women's councils, cooperatives, academies, and centers, women participate as subjects in all aspects of the process of building a free life."

=== Ecology ===
Abdullah describes the importance of environmental responsibility in the Rojava model of Democratic Autonomy, "The cantons have also adopted the model of a communal economy, in which social use is central, as opposed to the capitalist model, which maximizes profits and lays waste to nature. Through communal organizing, the citizens grow in consciousness and sensibility; they internalize respect for nature and a sense of ethical responsibility."

=== Community ===
Abdullah explains the goals of their communal democratic model as being "one that includes nature but does not exploit it, one in which people can control their own lives, in which sexual inequality is overcome, in which ethnic and religious wars come to an end, in which bridges of peace are constructed among groups of people, and in which poverty and exploitation are no more." It is based on "communal, solidarity focused coexistence" and thus "represents a new hope for the Middle East."
