= Kurdistan Democratic Party – Progressive Front =

Political party in Iraq

Kurdistan Democratic Party – Progressive Front was a Kurdish political party in Iraq. It was led by Hamza Abdallah, the General Secretary of Kurdish Democratic Party who had been expelled from KDP in January 1953.

Hamza and his followers were allowed to return to KDP in 1956.
