= Nûredîn Zaza =

Kurdish political figure (1919–1988)

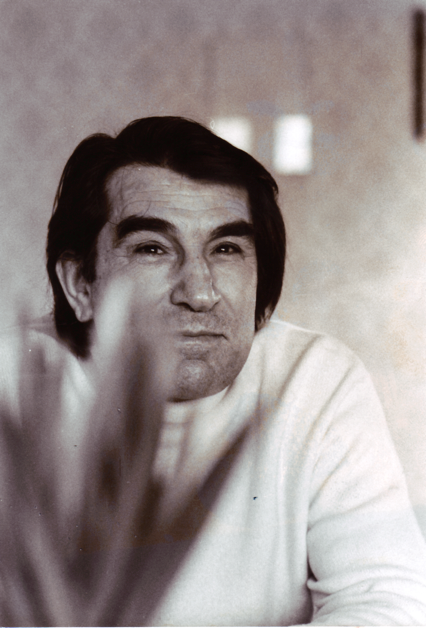
- Nûredîn in 1977

Personal details
- Born: 1919 Maden, Elazığ, Ottoman Empire
- Died: 1988 (aged 68–69) Bussigny, Lausanne, Switzerland
- Party: Kurdistan Democratic Party of Syria (1957–1963)
- Education: Lausanne University

Nûredîn Zaza (born 15 February 1919 – 7 October 1988) was a Kurdish politician, writer and poet. He was a co-founder of the Kurdistan Democratic Party of Syria and a founding member of the Kurdish Institute of Paris.

== Biography ==
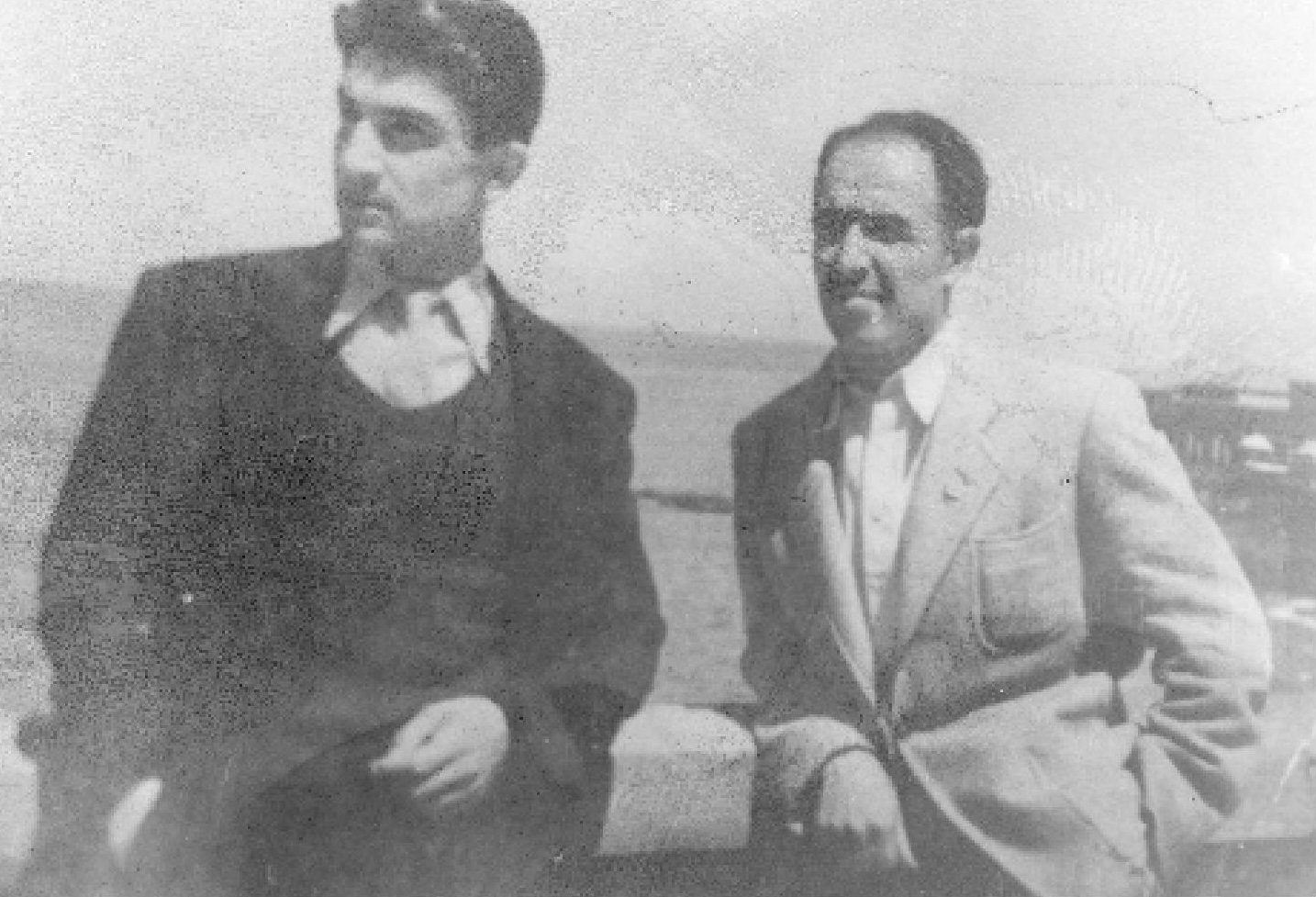
Nûredîn and Ramzi Nafi by a sea coast

Born in 1919 to a middle-class family in Maden, Elazığ in the years preceding the fall of the dissolution of the Ottoman Empire, he saw his father and brother get arrested by the Atatürk regime for having supported the Sheikh Said rebellion and the Ararat rebellion. In 1930, he was sent into exile to Syria together with his brother Ahmed Nafez Zaza. There, the brothers found support from the Bedir Khan family.

After spending a year in jail in British Iraq, he went to Beirut and later Switzerland for his studies. In Switzerland, he also founded an association for Kurdish students in Europe before returning to Syria. He also wrote for the magazine Hawar of the Bedir Khan brothers and contributed to the modernization of the Kurdish language. Zaza was also a member of Xoybûn and broadcast a radio program with Kamuran Alî Bedirxan during this period. In September 1962, he got briefly arrested by Syrian authorities, accusing him of supporting the Kurdish uprising in neighboring Iraq. After being jailed again in 1965 and the intensified Turkish threats, Zaza fled to Switzerland in July 1970 – the same country he had studied in.

Zaza wrote his dissertation on Emmanuel Mounier in 1955 in at the Lausanne University. Zaza's brother Suphi Ergene was a parliamentarian in the Turkish Parliament representing Elazığ district for the Democrat Party from 1954 to 1957.

Zaza spent his final years in Switzerland, where he tied the knot with Gilberte Favre, a Swiss writer and journalist. They were blessed with a son whom they named Chango Valery.

Zaza died on November 7, 1988, due to cancer. His final resting place is in the Bois-de-Vaux cemetery located in Lausanne.

== Kurdistan Democratic Party of Syria ==
In 1957, Zaza, along with Osman Sabri, Hamza Nuyran, Abdul Hamid Darwish, and a group of Kurdish politicians, founded the Kurdish Democratic Party of Syria. He became its first president in 1958. According to Zaza, the primary objective of the political party in question was to safeguard the distinct identity of the Kurdish community and promote their advancement, with the ultimate goal of achieving national liberation within the Syrian State's boundaries.

According to Abd al-Hamid Darwish, the Party of Syrian Democratic Kurds was established with the support of Jalal Talabani, who sought refuge in Damascus. It is worth noting that the party's original name was "Party of Syrian Democratic Kurds," which was later changed to "Kurdish Democratic Party in Syria" (KDP-S) when it was publicly announced on June 14, 1957.

During the period of unity between Syria and Egypt from 1958 to 1961, the United Arab Republic (UAR) authorities perceived a growing influence and role of the Kurdish party among the Kurds. To curtail the party's activities, Zaza and his associates were arrested in 1960. According to Zaza, the Kurdish party's cadres were detained because of pamphlets that opposed Gamal Abdel Nasser's policies.

During his time in prison, Zaza authored a significant memorandum addressed to the president of the Supreme Military State Security Court in Damascus. This document continues to garner noteworthy attention and warrants further serious study. The significance of this entreaty extends beyond the mere documentation of the unique political circumstances surrounding the Kurdish people in Syria. Rather, it presents an explicit appeal to uphold Syrian citizenship as an indispensable representation of the manifold diversity of nationalities and religions within Syria. This plea has the potential to implicate the state in charges of racial discrimination and offers optimal political alternatives for the construction of a just state in Syria.

== Cultural Contributions ==
Zaza, while studying in Switzerland, remained in contact with the problems facing his people and made considerable efforts to raise awareness among the European public about the righteous struggle of the Kurdish people. He established the Kurdish Students Society in Europe in 1949 along with some of his colleagues and held the position of its president. In addition, he issued a publication entitled "Voice of Kurdistan."[11]

Zaza was not only a political activist, but he was also an exceptional intellectual and writer. He penned hundreds of articles that were published in various newspapers and magazines, including "Hawar and Ronahi" and others. He translated Şivanê Kurmanca "The Kurdish Shepherd" book by Erebê Şemo from French to Kurdish, so that Kurds in Turkey could read it. Furthermore, he gave significant attention to the development of the Kurdish language.

== Selected literature ==
- Nûredin Zaza (1955). "Etude critique de la notion d'engagement chez Emmanuel Mounier". Histoire des Idées et Critique Littéraire (in French). 5079. Librairie Droz. ISSN 0073-2397.
- Nûredin Zaza (1974). Contes et poèmes kurdes (PDF) (in French). Geneva: Éditions Peuples et Création.
- Nûredin Zaza (1982). Ma vie de kurde: ou le cri du peuple kurde (in French). Éditions P.M. Favre.
- Nûredin Zaza (1995). Keskesor – Kurteçîrok (PDF) (in Kurdish). Stockholm: Nûdem. ISBN 91-88592-065.
- Nûredin Zaza, Gulê (Amed: Lîs, 2015). (in Kurdish) ISBN 978-9756179307
- Nûredin Zaza, Bîranîn (Stembol-Amed: Avesta). (in Kurdish) ISBN 978-9944382441
- Nûredin Zaza, Memê Alan (Bexda: Çapxaney Korî Zanyarî Kurd, 1977). (in Kurdish)
- Nûredin Zaza, Destana Memê Alan (Uppsala: Bahoz, 1973). (in Kurdish)
