= Kurdish Democratic Unity Party =

Kurdish Democratic Unity Party In Syria Partiya Yekîtiya Demokrata Kurd li Sûriyê
- Leader: Muhîddîn Şêx Alî
- Founder: Îsmaîl Omar
- Founded: 1993
- Ideology: Liberalism; Secularism; Kurdish nationalism Feminism
- Political position: Centre-left
- National affiliation: Kurdish National Alliance in Syria
- Colors: White, green, yellow and red.
- Slogan: Freedom, equality, and justice.

Party flag

Website
- Official Kurmanji Website

The Kurdish Democratic Unity Party in Syria (Yekiti, PYDKS or Yek-Dem) (Kurdish: پارتی یەکێتی دیموکراتی کورد لە سووریا, romanized: Partiya Yekîtiya Demokrata Kurd li Sûriyê; Arabic: حزب الوحدة الديمقراطي الكردي في سوريا, romanized: Hizb alwahdat aldiymuqratiu alkurdiu fi Suria), is a Syrian Kurdish political party which fights against what it terms as the oppression of the Kurdish people in Syria. The party promotes democratic freedoms, respect for human rights, and the national rights of the Kurdish people within the framework of the country's unity. The party believes in prioritizing kurdish cooporation in any means, and to stop conflicts between the pro-KCK and the pro-Barzani wings in Rojava.

The Kurdish Democratic Unity Party in Syria (Yekiti) has a base that extends from Dêrik hemko in the far north-east of Syria, through Qamişlo, Amûdê, Serê Kaniyê and Dirbêsiyê, all the way to Kobanî and Efrîn; PYDKS is one of the major parties sitting in the Syrian Democratic Council. The party maintains a presence in the Syrian capital, Damascus, as well as in Lebanon, Turkey, and a number of European countries, including Germany, Belgium, Netherlands, Switzerland, Austria, Britain, Denmark, Norway, Sweden, and Romania.

The party was a founder of the Damascus Declaration and the Kurdish National Alliance in Syria and was originally a member of the Kurdish National Council, but were expelled due to their cooperative attitude towards the Democratic Union Party (PYD). The party was also a member of the Kurdish National Alliance in Syria, which was led by Mistefa Meşayîx. The PYDKS has no military arm and uses nonviolent tactics, such as sit-ins, demonstrations and protests. Its activism has resulted in its members being arrested and what the party believes amounts to political detention.

== History ==
=== Foundation ===
The party was established in two stages. The first was the union of the Kurdish Democratic Party in Syria (al-Party) (led by Îsmaîl Omar), the Kurdish Action Party (led by Şêx Alî), and the Kurdish Left Party (led by Sîdîq Şernaxî). This union formed the Unified Party led by Îsmaîl Omar.

The second union brought together the Unified Party, the People's Union and the Workers’ Party, which became the PYDKS, which held its first conference in 1993. It was chaired by the late Îsmaîl Omar until his death in 2010. His successor was Mr. Sheikh Ali, who served until the party's seventh conference, which was held in Afrin in 2013. Şêx Alî was then elected party secretary, and Mistefa Meşayîx was elected deputy secretary.

=== Civil war outbreak 2011-present ===
After the outbreak of the Syrian revolution in 2011, the party adopted the principle of federalism for Syria to be a democratic, pluralistic, parliamentary state. During its struggle, the party presented a group of martyrs, among whom we mention: Solomon Addy, Abdî Qader, Abdul Hamîd Zebar, Kamal Hanan, Şêrzad Alamdarî, and Ahmed Buzan.

== Party symbol and logo ==
The party symbol is a circular frame. Its right arc is a wheat spike, symbolizing bread for all and equality without discrimination. Its left arc is an olive branch, a common symbol of peace.

At the top of the frame, a sun stands for freedom as well as the sun's role in the heritage of the Medes, the ancient ancestors of the Kurdish people. The center of the frame is filled with a winged horse, symbolizing the Hurrians (Mitanni), another Kurdish ancestral group. (These claims of heritage are made by some kurds, often kurdish nationalists, but they are disputed by some historians and linguists.)

The Kurdish flag (ala rengîn) was adopted by the PYDKS and approved it in its political platform (Article 4).
