= Ulla Jelpke =

German journalist and politician

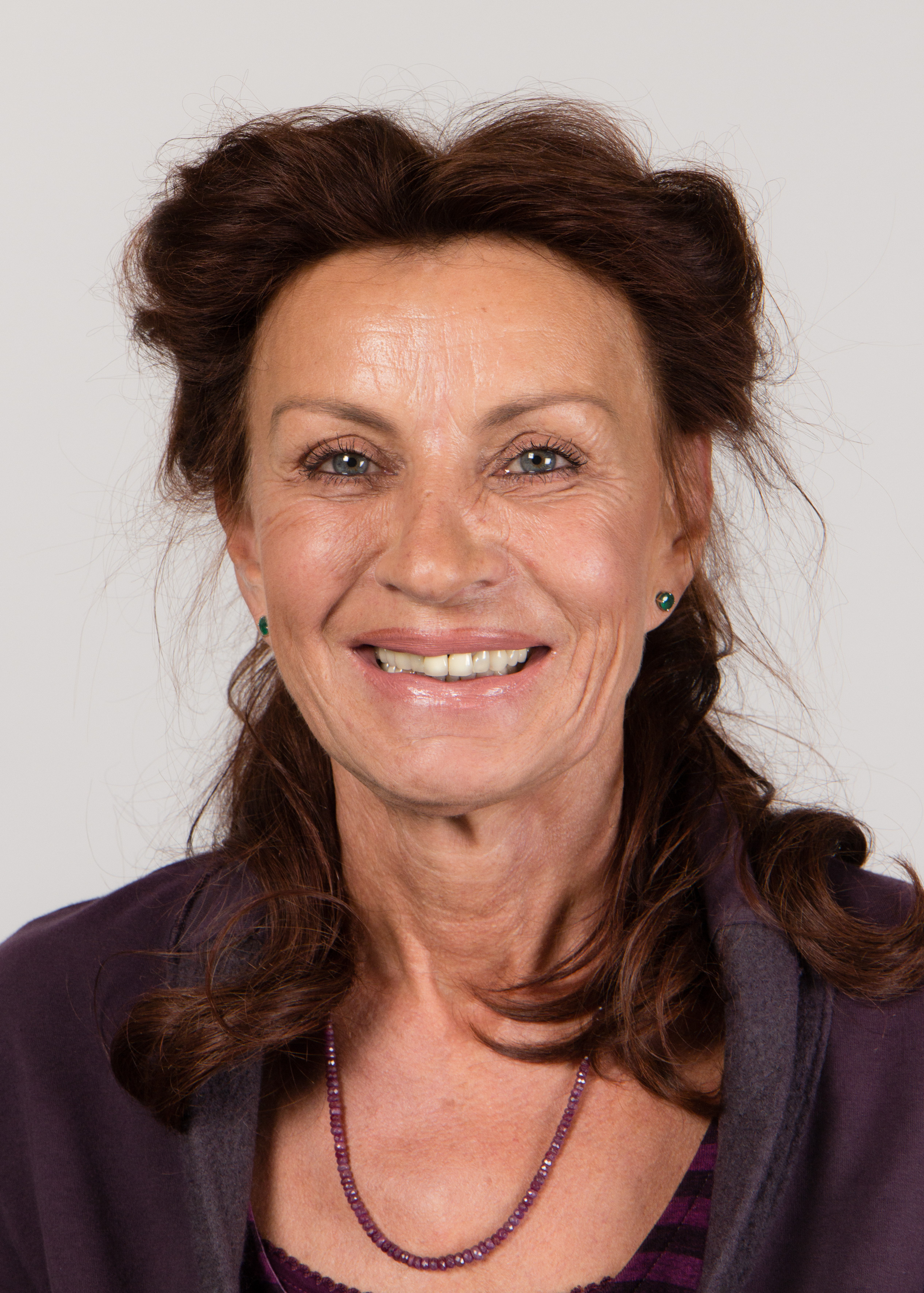
- Jelpke in 2014
- Born: 9 June 1951 (age 75); Hamburg, West Germany
- Political party: The Left (Die Linke); Formerly: Alliance 90/The Greens

Ursula "Ulla" Jelpke (born 9 June 1951) is a German journalist and politician. She is a former member of the German Bundestag where she was domestic affairs spokesperson for the party Die Linke and represented the party in the internal affairs committee and the legal affairs committee.

As a trained hairdresser and book seller, Jelpke later acquired a high school diploma and studied sociology and economics. From 2002 until 2005 she headed the domestic affairs desk at the newspaper Junge Welt in Berlin. Since 2003 she has been co-editor of the magazine Ossietzky.

Jelpke was a member of the Hamburg Bürgerschaft for the Green-Alternative List twice between 1981 and 1989. Starting from 1990, she has been a member of the 12th–14th, 16th and 17th German Bundestags respectively.

In November 2020, Jelpke announced that she would not seek reelection in the 2021 German federal election.
