= Kurdistan Democratic Party of Syria =

Kurdistan Democratic Party of Syria پارتی دیموکراتی کوردستان سووری الحزب الديمقراطي الكُردستاني في سوريا
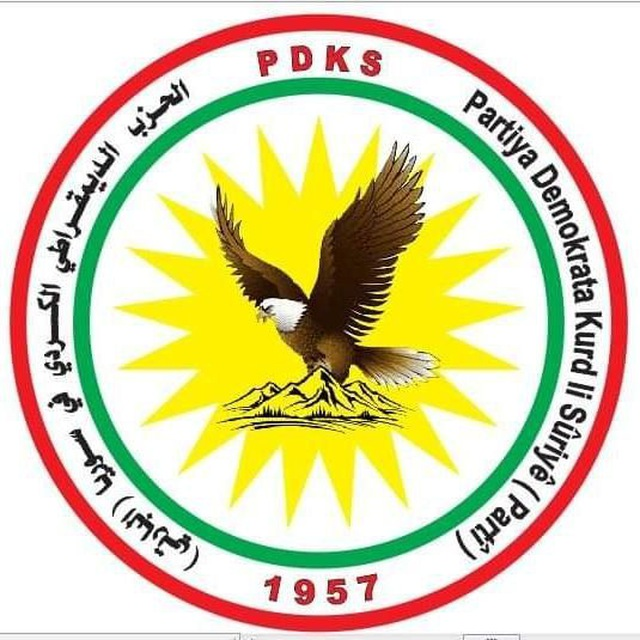
- Founded: 14 June 1957
- Ideology: Kurdish nationalism Kurdish autonomy Liberal democracy
- National affiliation: Kurdish National Council
- People's Assembly: 4 / 210

Party flag

Website
- http://www.pdk-s.com/

The Kurdistan Democratic Party of Syria (Kurdish: پارتی دیموکراتی کوردستان سووری, romanized: Partiya Demokrat a Kurdistanê li Sûriyê; Arabic: الحزب الديمقراطي الكُردستاني في سوريا Hizb Al-Dimuqrati Al-Kurdistani fi Suriya), or Kurdish Democratic Party in Syria, commonly known as KDPS, PDK-S or Elpartî, refers to a Kurdish Syrian political party founded in 1957 by Kurdish nationalists in northern Syria. Today, multiple parties claim direct continuity from the original.

== History ==
=== Founding ===
The party was first conceptualised as the Syrian Democratic Kurd's Party (Partiya Kurdên Demoqratên Sûrî), or PKDS, in 1956 by Osman Sabri, Hamzah Niweran, and Abd al-Hamid Darwish. Nûredin Zaza and Jalal Talabani, who had then settled in Damascus in exile, were brought in to help draft a charter. The formation of the party also involved members of the Aleppo Group, former members of the Syrian Communist Party who had split off in 1956 over its refusal to include Kurdish rights in its agenda. Intended to serve as a left-wing and explicitly Kurdish alternative to the Communist Party, its inaugural meeting was held on 14 June 1957.

The party's founding central committee consisted of Osman Sabri, who became its secretary, Abdul Hamid Darwish, Hamzah Niweran, Rashid Hammu, Muhammad Ali Khoja, Khalil Muhammad, and Shawkat Hanan Na'san, and was later expanded to include Muhammad Isa Mulla Mahmud in 1957, and Nûredin Zaza in 1958, who became its chairman. According to academic Abdulbaset Sieda, observers considered it to be a continuation of the Kurdish nationalist Xoybûn.

They were joined by the Society of the United Kurdish Democratic Youth in Syria (Civata Yekîtiya Xortên Demokrat ên Kurd li Sûriyê) in 1958, a leftist nationalist organisation formed by high school teachers and students, the Freedom Party (Partiya Azadî), which had broken away from the Communist Party the same year, as well as cultural groups.

Copies of the party's founding charter showed that it advocated for a "people's democracy" in Syria and positioned the party against imperial exploitation of the country, which once overcome, would advocate a special status for Kurds in Jazira, Kobani, and Afrin. It also expressed support for Kurdish nationalist movements in Turkey, Iraq, and Iran, and for the struggle of "all oppressed peoples" generally. However, the party's name and programme at this stage of its history has been contested by its various founders and early members in later decades. According to Darwish, the party had been founded as the Kurdish Democratic Party in Syria (Partiya Demokrat a Kurdî li Sûriyê) and only adopted the name of Kurdistan Democratic Party in Syria as well as the goal of an independent Kurdistan under the influence of Talabani and the Kurdistan Democratic Party in Iraq in 1959, but that these changes were reversed in 1963. Both Muhammad Mulla Ahmad and Osman Sabri corroborate this account, except they believed the changes had occurred in 1958 and 1960 respectively.

The party published two magazines, Dengê Kurd in Kurdish and Dimuqrat in Arabic, both of which focused on the Kurdish question and the political and cultural issues related to it.

=== Repression and first split ===
The party's adoption of a more nationalist stance or perception thereof, e.g. through the replacement of "Kurdish" with "Kurdistan" in its name and belief in an independent Kurdistan, may have contributed to its persecution by the state authorities during the period of union between Egypt and Syria between 1959 and 1961. In 1959, some central committee members were arrested while others fled across the border to Iraq. Mass arrests targeting the party were conducted in August 1960, eventually leading to more than 5,000 members being detained. Here, a split within the party began to emerge between Sabri and Zaza, reflecting the differing tactics both employed as a response to state persecution, but later expanded into an ideological and programmatic division between the left and right-wings of the party.

Those arrested were eventually sentenced by a military court in 1961. Zaza received a one-year sentence, Sabri and Rahisd Hammu one-and-a-half years, while regional heads received nine-month sentences, and ordinary members three-months. Shawkay Hannan Na'san received a two-year sentence, the longest, for recruiting a military officer.

Historians consider 1962 as the year the party had effectively split into two, and 1965 as the year the split was finalised between the left (çep) and right (rast) under Sabri and Darwish respectively. Principal points of contention included the Kurdish question in the Syrian context: were the Kurdish people in Syria a nation residing in its historical homeland of West Kurdistan, and thus have the right to self-determination—as the left-wing believed—or an immigrant national minority entitled to cultural rights and nothing more—as the right-wing argued? Should the party align with the democratic opposition—as the left-wing argued for—or stay loyal to state authorities? What is the party's position towards the transnational Kurdish national movement? Particularly, should it support the leadership of Mustafa Barzani—as the left-wing believes—or the Talabani opposition among Kurds in Iraq? Divisions among social classes within the party, landowners, merchants, and religious leaders on the one hand, and teachers, students, and workers on the other, also played a role.

An attempt to reunify the two factions in Iraq by Mustafa Barzani in 1970 failed to take root, as both Salah Bahrudin—who then led the left-wing—and Darwish both left for Germany and Syria respectively in 1971 to continue leading their factions of the party independent of each other and Barzani. Nevertheless, the Kurdish Democratic Party in Syria (Provisional Leadership) persisted, if only as a rump party, and effectively served as the Iraqi KDP's Syrian branch.

=== Successor parties and subsequent splits among them ===
This list is not exhaustive and may include out of date information.

==== Provisional Leadership ====
"Provisional Leadership" was dropped from the party name in 1972. It added (el-Parti) in 1981. Its leader as of 2011 was Abdulhakim Bashar.

- Kurdish Democratic Party in Syria (1975), later renamed the Syrian-Kurdish Democratic Party in 1978. Muhammad Baqi Mullah Mahmoud argued that the party ought to be explicitly Syrian rather than Kurdistani, following the 1975 Algiers Agreement.
- Kurdish Democratic Party in Syria (1981), later renamed the Kurdish Democratic Labor Party in Syria (Partiya Kar a Demoqrata Kurdî li Suriyê) in 1983. Merged into the United Kurdish Democratic Party in Syria (Partiya Demokrat a Kurdî ya Yekbûyî li Sûriyê) in 1990. Muhyiddin Sheikh Ali, who led the splinter party, disapproved of Kurdish participation in Syrian elections.
- Kurdish Democratic Party in Syria (1988), later merged into the United Kurdish Democratic Party in Syria in 1990. Led by Ismail Omar, claimed to be following the line of Mustafa Barzani and leadership of Iraqi Kurdistan.
- Kurdish Democratic Party in Syria (el-Parti) under Nasreddin Ibrahim (1998). Accused of aligning with opposing parties, namely the Kurdish Democratic Progressive Party.
- Kurdish Democratic Party—Syria (Partiya Demokrat a Kurdî ‒ Sûrî) (2004) under Abdulrahman Aluji. Accused the party secretary of abusing his power.

==== Right-wing ====
When Jalal Talabani announced the formation of his Patriotic Union of Kurdistan (PUK) and split off from the KDP in Iraq, Darwish aligned with Talabani and changed the party's name to the Kurdish Democratic Progressive Party (PDPKS).

- Kurdish Democratic Equality Party (Partiya Wekhevî ya Demokrat a Kurdî li Sûriyê) (1992)
  - Kurdish Democratic Patriotic Party (Partiya Welatparêz a Demokrat a Kurdî li Sûriyê) (1998)

==== Left-wing ====
The left-wing renamed itself the Kurdish Democratic Left Party in Syria (Partiya Çep a Demokrat a Kurdî li Sûriyê) in 1975, and Kurdish Popular Union Party in Syria (Partiya Hevgirtina Gelê Kurd li Sûriyê) in 1980. It became the Kurdish Freedom Party in Syria (Partiya Azadî ya Kurdî li Sûriyê) in 2005. The Kurdish Freedom Party in Syria split into two in 2011, both factions later merged into the Kurdish Democratic Party in Syria (Provisional Leadership) in 2014.

- Kurdish Democratic Left Party in Syria (1975), later renamed the Kurdish Left Party in Syria (Partiya Çep a Kurdî li Sûriyê) in 1998.
  - Kurdish Toilers' Party in Syria (Partiya Zehmetkêşanên Kurd li Sûriyê) (1982), later merged into the Kurdish Democratic Unity Party (Democratic Yekiti) in 1993.
  - Kurdish Democratic Left Party in Syria (1989), later merged into the United Kurdish Democratic Party in Syria (Partiya Demokrat a Kurdî ya Yekbûyî li Sûriyê) in 1990.
  - Faction merges with the Kurdish Popular Union Party in Syria to form the Kurdish Freedom Party in Syria in 1998.
  - Kurdish Democratic Left Party in Syria (2012) under Salih Gedo.
- Kurdish Socialist Party in Syria (Partiya Sosyalîst a Kurdî li Sûriye) (1977), merged into the Kurdish Left Party in Syria in 2002.

==== Yekiti ====
Kurdish Democratic Unity Party (Democratic Yekiti) is formed in 1993 following the merger of the Kurdish Toilers' Party in Syria and the United Kurdish Democratic Party in Syria.

- Kurdish Unity Party in Syria (Partiya Yekîtî ya Kurdî li Sûriyê, Yekiti) (1999)
  - Split led by Abdulsalam Khalaf Biro (2021), later merged with a Democratic Yekiti splinter led by Hajar Ali in 2021 to form the People’s Party of Syrian Kurdistan (Partiya Gel ya Kurdistan-Sûriyê).
- Breakaway faction merges into the Kurdish Left Party in Syria in the mid-2000s.
- Split led by Fasla Yusuf (2014/2015)
  - Split led by Hajar Ali (2016), merged with Khalaf Biro's Yekiti splinter in 2021, reactivated by Hajar in 2023.

=== Syrian civil war and Rojava campaign ===
The KDPS did not join the Syrian National Council at first, Secretary-General Abdulhakim Bashar seeing this body as too influenced by the country of Turkey. He demanded guarantees for the Syrian Kurdish population by the SNC and, in turn, stated Turkey's obligation to grant full rights to its own Kurdish population. Following disputes with the dominant Kurdish party in Syria, the Democratic Union Party (PYD), the KDPS however later led the Kurdish National Council (ENKS) to join the SNC.

To counter the PYD's dominance in the Kurdish National Council (ENKS), the KDPS set up an alliance named Kurdish Democratic Political Union in late 2012. The strategy however failed and even backfired ultimately driving other ENKS members into cooperation with the PYD. In early April 2014, the Kurdish Freedom Party in Syria (Partiya Azadî ya Kurdî li Sûriyê, or Azadî), and three other parties merged into the KDPS.

In Syria, the constitution states that political parties cannot be founded on ethnic, religious, regional and tribal basis, which has been one of the pretexts used to persecute Kurdish political organizations.

== See also ==
- List of armed groups in the Syrian Civil War
