= Kurdish National Council =

Kurdish National Council in Syria Encûmena Niştimanî ya Kurdî li Sûriyê
- Arabic name: المجلس الوطني الكوردي في سوريا
- Leader: Mohammad Ismail
- Founder: Ibrahim Biro
- Founded: 26 October 2011 (15 years ago)
- Headquarters: Ankara; Erbil
- Paramilitary wing: Peshmerga Roj (in Iraq)
- Ideology: Conservatism; Kurdish nationalism Federalism; Anti-Iran; Pro-KDP
- Political position: Centre-right
- National affiliation: Kurdish Supreme Committee (2012–2015); National Coalition for Syrian Revolutionary and Opposition Forces (2013–2025)
- International affiliation: Kurdistan Democratic Party
- People's Assembly: 6 / 210

Website
- https://r-enks.net/

The Kurdish National Council in Syria (KNCS, Kurdish: ئەنجومەنی نیشتمانیی کورد لە سووریا, romanized: Encûmena Niştimanî ya Kurdî li Sûriyê, ENKS; Arabic: المجلس الوطني الكوردي في سوريا, romanized: al-Majlis al-Waṭaniyy Al-Kurdi fī Sūriya) or Kurdish National Council (KNC) is a Syrian Kurdish political coalition primarily active in the Kurdish-majority areas of Hasakah Governorate and Kobani (Ayn al-Arab).

While the KNC had initially more international support than the Democratic Union Party (PYD), another Kurdish party that is the main ruling party in the Kurdish-led Democratic Autonomous Administration of North and East Syria during the early years of the Syrian civil war alongside a strong supporter basis among some Syrian Kurdish refugees, the overwhelming popular support the PYD enjoys has eroded support for the KNC in Syrian Kurdistan, losing almost all popular support.

Since 2012, the alleged authoritarian and Kurdish nationalist politics of the KNC has led many political parties to leave it. Over the years, its membership has shrunk and it has lost many of its supporters. Among the factions that left the KNC were the Kurdish Democratic Progressive Party in 2015, and the parties in the Kurdish National Alliance in Syria and the Syrian Yazidi Council in 2016. As a result, the KNC had only two seats left in the Syrian Democratic Council by 2017.

== History ==
The Kurdish National Council was founded in Erbil on the 26 October 2011, under the sponsorship of Kurdistan Region President Massoud Barzani, following the earlier creation of the Syrian National Council. The organization was originally composed of 11 Syrian Kurdish parties, however, by May 2012 this had grown to 15.

Several KNC parties have also on occasion come into conflict with other Kurdish groups like the Democratic Union Party (PYD). In order to reduce tensions, Massoud Barzani mediated between the two groups in July 2012 at a diplomatic meeting in Erbil. As a result, the PYD and some other Kurdish groups joined with the Kurdish National Council to form the Kurdish Supreme Committee along with a popular defence force to defend Syrian Kurdistan. The agreement became obsolete when the PYD with several pro-federal Kurdish parties abandoned the coalition after they accused the KNC of allying with Syrian rebels that were attacking Kurdish cities. Later, the PYD with other Kurdish, Arab and Assyrian parties made a deal for the aim of creating a polyethnic and progressive society and policy in the Rojava region, creating the Movement for a Democratic Society (TEV-DEM).

== Criticism and conflict with the PYD and further events ==
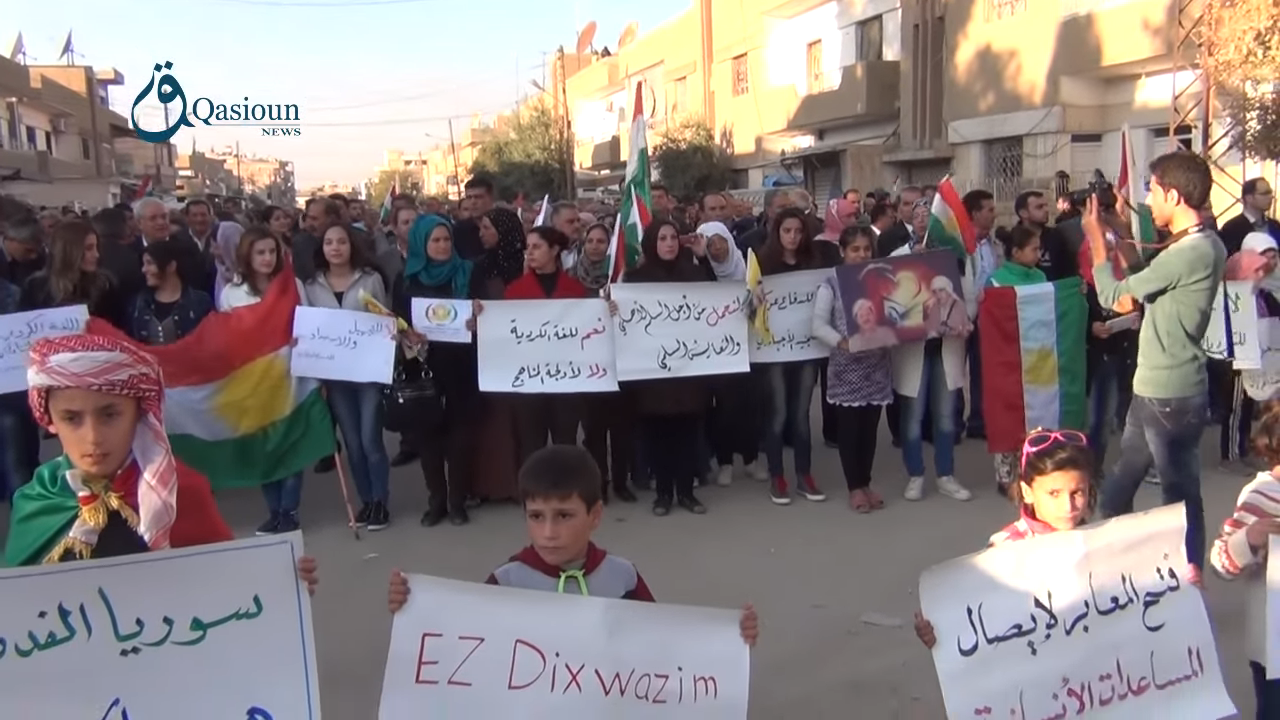
KNC and KDP supporters demonstrate in Qamishli, 13 November 2015

The Kurdish National Council has been criticized by PYD supporters in Syrian Kurdistan. The KNC has been accused by PYD supporters of working with Turkey and the Syrian opposition forces against the Federation of Northern Syria – Rojava (NSR). In 2016, some KNC leaders and members were accused by ruling PYD authorities of corruption, money laundering, spying, making propaganda for Turkey and involving in assassinations of NSR authorities and politicians. The KNC have refused to formally join the PYD-led NSR administration citing PYD persecution of political opponents. The KNC leader Ibrahim Biro said in his interview on Turkish pro-government Sabah newspaper that PYD is ruling in a dictatorial manner committing gross human rights violations in the process and that western countries are overlooking these violations in using PKK against ISIS, he also stressed that Western countries should start supporting their own forces instead of PYD and other NSR entities. KNC members and leaders have had meetings with Turkish authorities, citing need for dialogue with Turkey, if Kurds are to gain autonomy from Damascus.

There have been several demonstrations held by KNC supporters against PYD citing PYD refusal to share power and ongoing persecution of Kurdish political opposition. Some observers have had difficulties understanding the KNC. Carl Drott, a sociology researcher at the University of Oxford, said in his interview on Ara News that "it is hard to know what the KNC actually wants. There is a fundamental contradiction between the Kurdish nationalist ideology of the KNC and the political project of its Syrian allies (Syrian opposition). Sometimes it seems that the only consistent policy of the KNC is to oppose anything that the PYD does". The PYD members have described the KNC as "an enemy of the peoples of Syria." The KNC meanwhile have described the PYD as dictators and tyrants and accused them of betraying Kurds in Syria by working with Assad and replacing one dictatorship with their own.

On 13 August 2016, Asayish arrested Ibrahim Biro, leader of the KNC and the Kurdish Union (Yekîtî) Party, in Qamishli and took him to an unknown location. At the same day, reporter Wedat Hussein Ali who was working for Roj TV, a TV channel linked to the PKK, had been killed in KDP-controlled area. Some ARA News journalists alluded that the two incidents might be linked to the rivalry between the PKK and KDP, which support the PYD and KNC, respectively. After Biro's detention, dozens who belonged to Yekîtî Party, organized a sit-in in front of the city's PYD office to condemn the arrest, while PYD supporters took the South Kurdistan flag, symbol of both KNC as well as KDP, from the Yekîtî Party's office in southern Qamishli. Biro was released the next day, claiming that he had been detained for the KNC's "political activities" and that the PYD would fail, because "it is impossible for the people of Syria to accept another dictatorship." He subsequently sought asylum in Dohuk with the KDP, though he said he would return to Rojava.

According to SOHR, the Asayish arrested further Yekîtî Party and KDPS members in Amuda and the Afrin Canton on 16 August, most prominently Yekîtî politician Anwar Naso. The arrests prompted further sit-ins and protests by KNC supporters. Most of the arrested KNC members, among them Anwar Naso, were released a few hours later. The rest of them were released on 24 November 2016.

After the outbreak of the Battle of al-Hasakah between pro-government and pro-PYD forces on the same day of August 2016, the KNC condemned the Syrian government for their attacks on civilians and urged both sides to stop fighting. At the same time, however, KNC politicians also said that the PYD should allow the Rojava Peshmerga into the city to protect the Kurdish population and that, at best, the government should be driven from Rojava.

On 19 September, the Syrian Yazidi Council left both the KNC as well as the Syrian National Council after months of tension over the "failure to acknowledge the SNC's Arabism and Islamism problems" and the lack of representation for Yazidis within the Syrian opposition.

On 25 October, the Kurdish National Council condemned the "indiscriminate" Turkish bombings on populated towns such as Jandairis and other towns in the northern Aleppo Governorate. The council stated that "the Turkish Army and allied Islamist rebels have been killing civilians, carrying out indiscriminate shelling and airstrikes on populated areas." and demanded the Turkish Armed Forces to withdraw its forces. A KNC member also denounced the Turkish focus on attacking the Syrian Democratic Forces as part of the Turkish military intervention in Syria.

On 24 November, Asayish released some KNC politicians and many activists, with the rest to be released "in the following days". Zara Salih of the Yekîtî Party said that his party saw "this first step as a positive sign and a good start" and that his party's leadership is "ready to begin negotiations with PYD and the Movement for a Democratic Society, to reach a new deal."

On 30 March 2017, the Kurdish National Council withdrew from the High Negotiations Committee in protest of the HNC's policies. An official in the Kurdish Unity Party, part of the KNC, stated that "The Syrian opposition are against federalism and constitutional Kurdish national rights, and they want to delay discussing Kurdish rights in the future."

On 30 April, the Afrin branch of the Kurdish National Council released a statement condemning the April 2017 Turkish airstrikes in Syria and Iraq. "We condemn and denounce the Turkish aggression and demand the government of Ankara to stop the [attacks] immediately, we also ask PYD [Democratic Union Party] authorities to change its approach and authoritarian behavior and move towards a national and responsible approach to serve the unity of the Kurds and the Kurdish project in the face of challenges and serious risks in the present time and in the future for our Kurdish people", the council stated.

On 7 February 2025, the KNC withdrew from the Syrian National Coalition and from the Syrian Negotiation Commission. During the 2025–26 Syrian parliamentary election, the party gained four seats in the People's Assembly after the by-elections held in Ayn al-Arab District and Hasakah Governorate.

== Ideology ==
Although the KNC joined the Syrian National Coalition and is a part of the Syrian opposition, there are some key differences between the KNC and the SNC over their approach to the issue of decentralization, with the KNC pressing for Kurdish autonomy, whereas the SNC has rejected anything more than administrative decentralization. The issue of federalism and autonomy is also a point of contention for KNC and PYD, even though both parties have very similar aims. As such, the KNC has condemned the PYD's declaration of a federation in northern Syria as an attempt to break up Syria without previous "debate and democratic participation". The KNC further claimed that "it strictly opposes any attempt to impose federalism on the Syrian people without a preceding discussion". These statements have raised confusion among some mostly pro-PYD observers, with Carl Drott, a sociology researcher at the University of Oxford, commenting that "It is hard to know what the KNC actually wants. There is a fundamental contradiction between the Kurdish nationalist ideology of the KNC and the political project of its Syrian allies. Sometimes it seems that the only consistent policy of the KNC is to oppose anything that the PYD does."

Some Syrian Kurdish refugees in Iraqi Kurdistan, who are believed to mostly support the KNC, have been also critical of the federalism declaration by PYD. Some of them fear that further tensions in Syria would arise as result of the declaration, while they simply wish for an end of hostilities. Despite these divisions about how to implement Kurdish autonomy, the KNC still generally supports federalism. This was shown when Syrian opposition leader Michel Kilo outright condemned any attempt of Kurds to establish federalism in Syria, negatively comparing them to Israel. The KNC reacted to the statement in which it accused Kilo of racism and acting to please President Recep Tayyip Erdoğan and Turkey. Nevertheless, the KNC also argued that the Kurds still had friends among the Syrian National Coalition, thereby reiterating their general support for the Syrian opposition in the wider struggle against Assad who they consider the greatest issue facing Kurds in Syria and a common enemy for both Arab and Kurdish opposition.

== Military wing ==
Politically, in 2015, the Kurdish National Council established the Rojava Peshmerga (in Kurdish: Peşmerge rojava).

The KNC leader claimed that partially in response to the military power of the PYD, the KNC formed its own paramilitary wing, the Rojava Peshmerga. According to the claims of Ibrahim Biro, the Rojava Peshmergas are mostly recruited from Syrian Kurdish refugees and Syrian Army deserters in Kurdistan Region.

Because of the refusal of the Democratic Autonomous Administration of North and East Syria, the Rojava Peshmerga was unable to participate in the Syrian civil war or control any area in Syria militarily.

== Parties within the ENKS ==
Name	Leader
Kurdish Democratic Equality Party in Syria	Aziz Dawud
Kurdish Reform Movement	Feysel Yusuf
Kurdish Democratic Left Party in Syria	Muhammed Musa Muhammed
Yekiti Kurdistan Party (Syria)	Ibrahim Biro
Kurdish Future Movement in Syria	Cemal Molla Mahmud
Kurdistan Democratic Party of Syria	Si'ud Mala
Kurdish Left Democrat Party of Syria	Muhammad Salih Gedo
Syrian Kurdish Democratic Party	Cemal Sheikh Bakî
Kurdish Democrat Union Party in Syria	Muhiddin Sheikh Ali
Kurdish Freedom Party in Syria	Mustafa Hıdır Oso
Kurdish Democrat Party of Syria	Abdurraham Aluci-Lazgin
Kurdish Democrat Party (al-parti) in Syria	Nasreddin Ibrahim
Kurdish Democrat Patriotic Party In Syria	Tahir Sifuk
Kurdistan People's Party - Syria	Abdul Samad Khalaf Biro

== Electoral history ==
=== People's Assembly ===
Election	Seats	+/–	Position
2025–26	6 / 210	▲6	▲2nd

== See also ==
- Democratic Autonomous Administration of North and East Syria
- Rojava conflict

== Bibliography ==
- Gunes, Cengiz; Lowe, Robert (2015). The Impact of the Syrian War on Kurdish Politics Across the Middle East (PDF). London: Chatham House. Archived from the original (PDF) on 9 October 2017.
