= Yekiti Kurdistan Party – Syria =

Yekiti Kurdistan Party – Syria Partîya Yekîtîya Kurdistani – Sûrîyê حزب يكيتي الكردستاني – سوريا
- General Secretary: Sulaiman Oso
- Founded: 2000
- Headquarters: Qamishli, Syria
- Ideology: Syrian Federalism; Kurdish autonomy

Website
- Yekiti Media

The Yekiti Kurdistan Party – Syria (Kurdish: Partîya Yekîtîya Kurdistani – Sûrîyê, lit. 'Kurdistan Unity Party'; Arabic: حزب يكيتي الكردستاني – سوريا) or PYKS, formerly the Kurdish Yekiti Party in Syria, is a Kurdish party active in Kurdish areas of Syria, seeking Kurdish federalism in Syria. It is also active in areas and neighborhoods with a Kurdish majority in Syria.

Its first constituent conference was held in 2000, where the party's name was Kurdish Yekiti Party in Syria from the date of its founding until the party's eighth convention on 23 December 2018, in the city of Qamishli, the party's name was changed to Yekiti Kurdistan Party – Syria.

The party is a revolutionary party that seeks to find a solution to the "Kurdish issue in Syria" and to defend the rights of the "Kurdish people in Syria" in general, calling for the recognition of Kurds in Syria, in favor of a federal system similar to the Iraqi federal system, within Iraqi Kurdistan independent of the central Iraqi state.

== Party Secretaries ==
A list of the names of party secretaries since its establishment and until now:

Ranking	Name	Beginning of custody	End of custody
1	Abdul Baki Yousef	From 2000	To 2004
2	Hassan Saleh	From 2004	To 2007
3	Fouad Aliko	From 2007	To 2010
4	Ismail Hamieh	From 2010	To 2013
5	Ibrahim Biro	From 2013	To 2018
6	Sulaiman Oso	From 2018	
