= Democratic Union Party (Syria) =

Kurdish political party

Democratic Union Party Partiya Yekîtiya Demokrat
- Arabic name: حزب الاتحاد الديمقراطي
- Leader: Asya Abdullah; Salih Muslim (until 2026)
- Founded: 20 September 2003
- Armed wings: People's Protection Units; Women's Protection Units
- Ideology: Democratic confederalism Libertarian socialism Communalism; Jineology
- Political position: Left-wing
- National affiliation: Kurdish Supreme Committee (2012–2013)
- Regional affiliation: Kurdistan Communities Union
- International affiliation: Koma Civakên Kurdistan; Socialist International (Consultative)
- Autonomous Administration of North and East Syria: TEV-DEM
- Colors: Green, red, yellow
- People's Assembly: 1 / 210
- Democratic Council: 3 / 43

Party flag

Website
- Official website

The Democratic Union Party (Kurmanji Kurdish: Partiya Yekîtiya Demokrat, pronounced [paːrtɨjaː jɛkiːtɨja dɛmokraːt], PYD; Arabic: حزب الاتحاد الديمقراطي, romanized: Ḥizb al-Ittiḥad al-Dimuqraṭiy; Classical Syriac: ܓܒܐ ܕܚܘܝܕܐ ܕܝܡܩܪܐܛܝܐ, romanized: Gabo d'Ḥuyodo Demoqraṭoyo) is a Kurdish left-wing political party established on 20 September 2003 in northern Syria. It is a founding member of the National Coordination Committee for Democratic Change. It is the leading political party among Syrian Kurds. The PYD was established as a Syrian branch of the Kurdistan Workers' Party (PKK) in 2003, and both organizations are still closely affiliated through the Kurdistan Communities Union (KCK).

== Ideology ==
On its website, the PYD describes itself as believing in "social equality, justice and the freedom of belief" as well as "pluralism and the freedom of political parties". It describes itself as "striving for a democratic solution that includes the recognition of cultural, national and political rights, and develops and enhances their peaceful struggle to be able to govern themselves in a multicultural, democratic society." The PYD is a member of the Kurdistan Communities Union (KCK) and also a consultative member of the Socialist International. The PYD and the PKK are closely affiliated through the Kurdistan Communities Union (KCK). The PYD has adopted democratic confederalism as its main ideology and have implemented the ideas of Murray Bookchin and Abdullah Öcalan in the DAANES, where hundreds of neighborhood-based communes have established across northeastern Syria.

Like its sister organisations in the KCK umbrella, the PYD is critical of nationalism, including Kurdish nationalism, in contrast to the Kurdish nationalist aims of the Kurdish National Council.

== History ==
=== Origins and foundation ===
In order to exert pressure on regional rivals, former Syrian President Hafez al-Assad supported Kurdish factions in neighboring Iraqi and Turkish Kurdistan. In 1975, Assad offered the Iraqi Kurdish leader Jalal Talabani a safe haven in Damascus to form his new Patriotic Union of Kurdistan (PUK) Party. From the 1980s until the late 1990s, Assad also supported the PKK against his regional rival Turkey, similarly providing a safe haven for PKK leader Abdullah Öcalan and allowing the PKK to use Syrian Kurdistan as a base of operations.

In 1998, the Syrian government banned Kurdish political parties and organizations, including the PUK and PKK, withdrawing its support and forcing them to leave Syria. During a meeting in Kobane in October 1998, Öcalan attempted to lay the foundations of a new party, which aim was obstructed by the Syrian secret service. In 2003, a second attempt led to the establishment of the PYD by Syrian Kurds. At the same year, Salih Muslim left the Kurdistan Democratic Party of Syria (KDP-S), an affiliate of the Kurdistan Democratic Party of Iraq, and joined the newly formed PYD.

=== Underground activism and state repression (2004–2010) ===
PYD members suffered years of violent repression at the hands of the Syrian government. Though Syrian security forces had already for several years been targeting members of Kurdish political parties and organizations, the PYD came under intensified persecution in the aftermath of the 2004 Qamishli riots. According to Human Rights Watch, the Syrian government saw the party as a particular threat due to its "ability to mobilise large crowds", and suspected it of organising numerous demonstrations. Therefore, many PYD activists imprisoned in the aftermath of the uprising were not given the amnesty that Bashar al-Assad granted other Kurdish detainees as a later goodwill gesture.

On 2 November 2007, PYD activists organised large demonstrations in Qamishli and Kobani, drawing hundreds of Kurds to protest Turkish threats to invade Iraqi Kurdistan, and Syria's support of Turkey. Security forces—including a unit brought from Damascus—fired tear gas in an effort to disperse the crowds. After some protesters threw stones, the police opened fire with live ammunition, killing one and injuring at least two more. Dozens (including women and children) were detained in the ensuing police crackdown. Most were soon released, but 15 activists—three of them PYD officials—remained imprisoned and were sent before a military court on various charges.

From 2006 to 14 April 2009, at least two dozen PYD activists were formally tried before a special security court, some receiving sentences from five to seven years on charges of membership in a "secret organisation" and seeking "to cut off part of Syrian land to join it to another country". Many others were detained, often in severe conditions and without basic legal rights—some of those released reported being kept in extended solitary confinement and even being subjected to physical and psychological torture. Syrian security forces also often continued to harass activists and their families following their release. While similar methods were employed against many Kurdish prisoners and activists in Syria, Human Rights Watch noted that the security forces tended to reserve their harshest treatments for PYD members.

=== Conflict in Syria (2011–present) ===
==== Stance in early stages of the conflict (March 2011–July 2012) ====
With the outbreak of anti-government demonstrations across Syria in early 2011, the PYD joined the Kurdish Patriotic Movement in May, was a founding member of the National Coordination Committee for Democratic Change in July, and of the KCK-aligned People's Council of Western Kurdistan in December. Unlike most other Kurdish Syrian parties, it did not join the Kurdish National Council (KNC) when it was formed in October 2011, but agreed on cooperation with the KNC and as a result, the Kurdish Supreme Committee was founded. The PYD adopted a critical stance toward both the Syrian government and the Syrian opposition, including the Syrian National Council (SNC), which it accused of acting in Turkey's interests. The SNC's unwillingness to support Kurdish autonomy led all but one of its Kurdish parties to leave by February 2012. Over 640 PYD-linked prisoners were released by the Syrian security apparatus in 2011, most of whom returned to the north.

==== Assertion of control in Northeastern Syria (July 2012–July 2013) ====
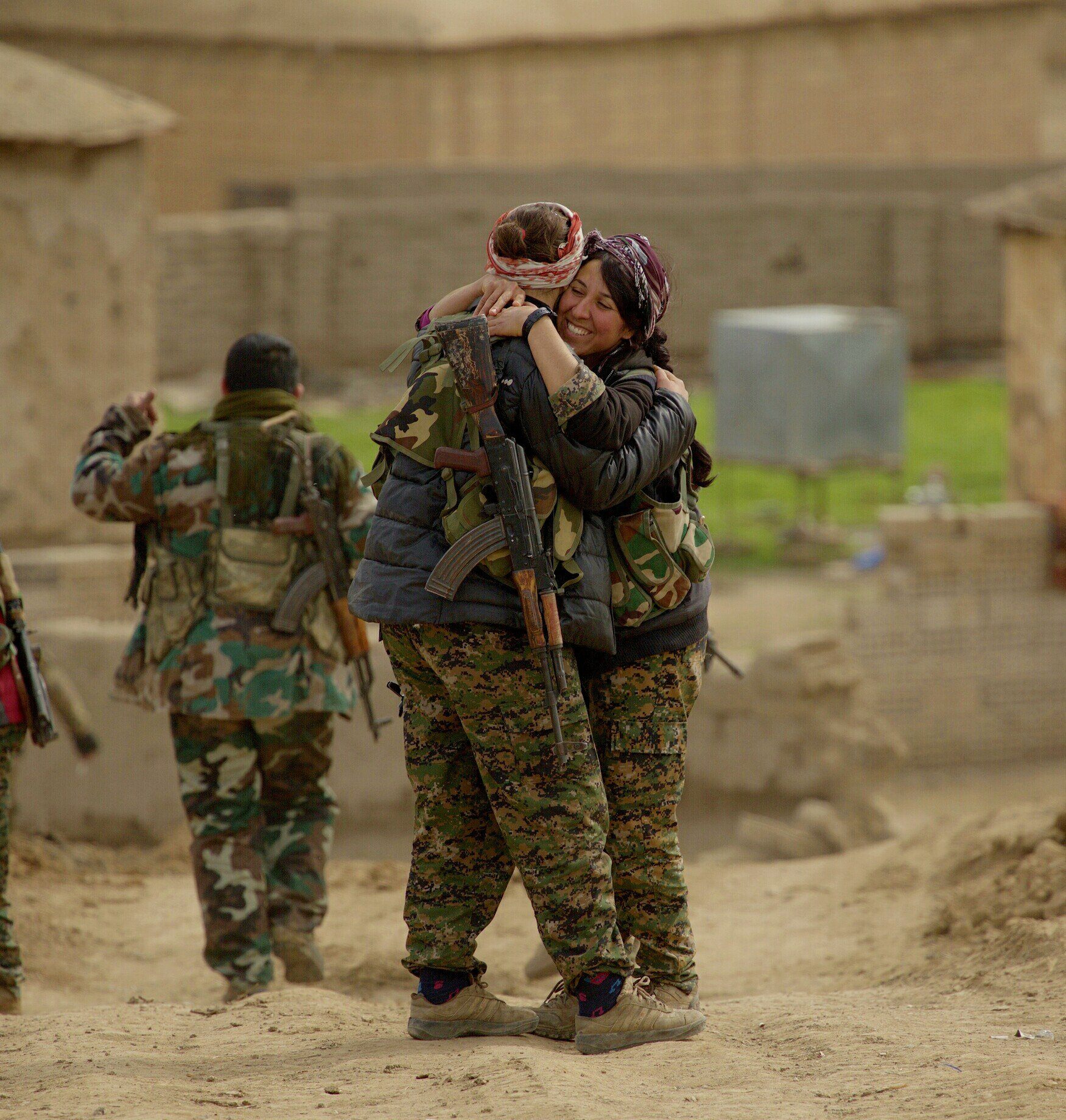
The People's Protection Units (YPG) were initially formed by the Democratic Union Party (PYD)

In mid-2012 the People's Council of Western Kurdistan signed an agreement with the Kurdish National Council (KNC), forming a joint Kurdish Supreme Council (Kurdish Supreme Committee) and agreeing to cooperate on security for Kurdish areas, forming People's Defense Units (YPG). This followed an "operational decision made by the Assad government in mid-July 2012 to withdraw the majority of its forces from Syria's Kurdish areas" (leaving a strong presence only in Qamishli and Al-Hasakah), prompted by a major opposition offensive against the capital Damascus. According to the Carnegie Middle East Center, "Despite these agreements, the Kurdish National Council has accused the PYD of attacking Kurdish demonstrators, kidnapping members of other Kurdish opposition parties, and setting up armed checkpoints along the border with Turkey." In mid-2012 Reuters cited unconfirmed reports that the towns of Amuda, Derik, Kobani and Afrin were under PYD control. Abdelbasset Seida, head of the opposition Syrian National Council claimed in July 2012 after a meeting with Turkish Foreign Minister Ahmet Davutoğlu that the Syrian Army had handed over control of certain parts of northeastern Syria to the PYD. The PYD's alleged control over certain areas was said to have led to disputes and clashes between the PYD, the KNC, and the Syrian National Council.

The PYD soon became the dominant force in the Kurdish opposition, with its members running checkpoints on major roads and entrances to Kurdish cities. Under the agreement with the KNC, cities that fall under the control of Syrian Kurdish forces would be ruled jointly by the PYD and the KNC until an election can be held. However, the PYD quickly abandoned the coalition with Kurdish nationalists for the aim of creating a polyethnic and progressive society and polity in the Rojava region.

==== Moves toward official autonomy (July 2013–present) ====
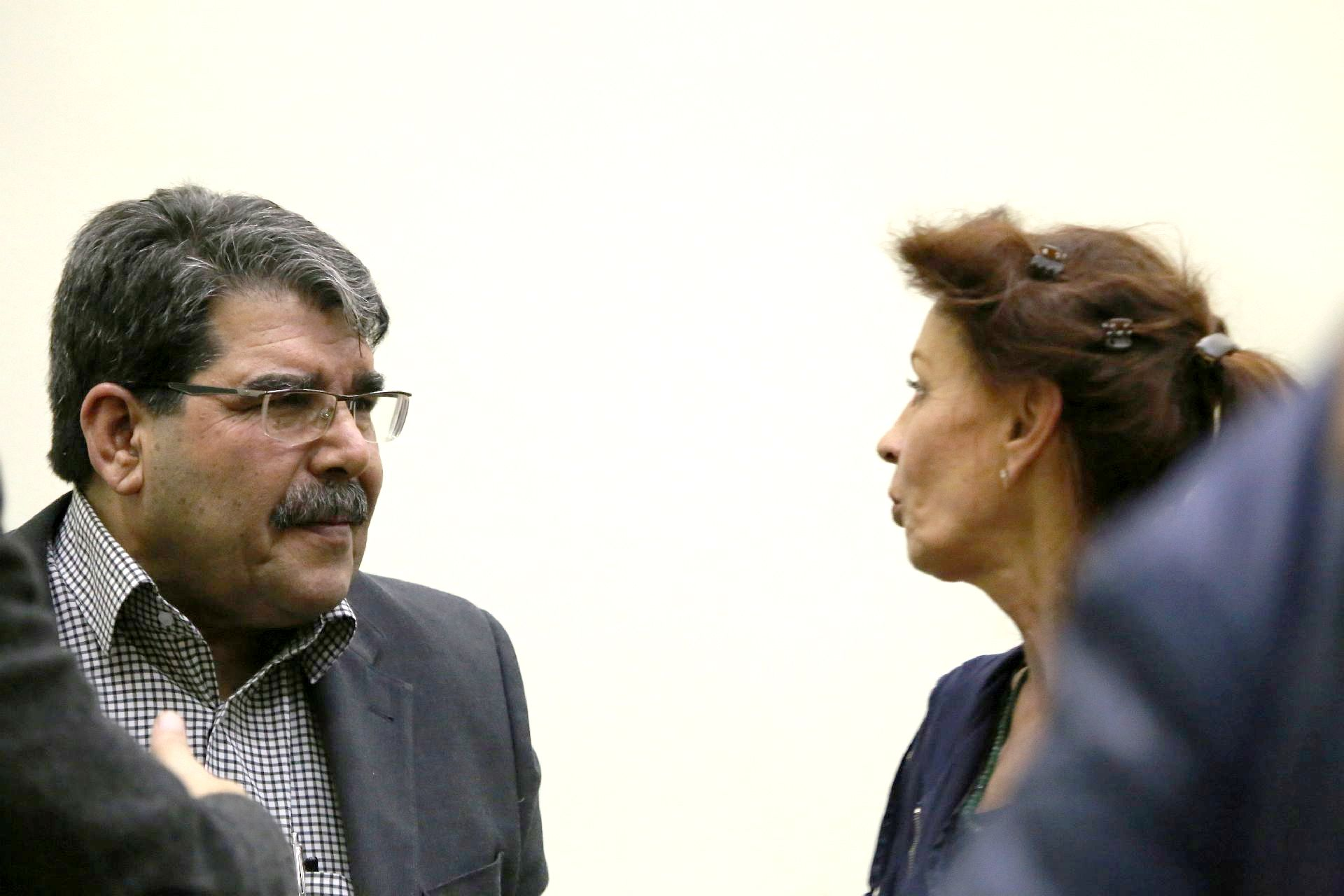
Salih Muslim, co-chairman of Rojava's leading Democratic Union Party (PYD) with Ulla Jelpke at Rosa Luxemburg Foundation in Berlin

In November 2013, the PYD announced an interim government, divided into three non-contiguous autonomous areas or cantons, Afrin, Jazira and Kobani. Leftist media commented that "Kurdish rebels are establishing self-rule in war-torn Syria, resembling the Zapatista experience and providing a democratic alternative for the region."

The polyethnic Movement for a Democratic Society (TEV-DEM), led by the Democratic Union Party (PYD), is the political coalition governing Rojava. According to Zaher Baher of the Haringey Solidarity Group, the PYD-led TEV-DEM has been "the most successful organ" in Rojava because it has the "determination and power" to change things, it includes many people who "believe in working voluntarily at all levels of service to make the event/experiment successful".

The Rojava system of community government is focused on direct democracy. The system has been described as pursuing "a bottom-up, Athenian-style direct form of democratic governance", contrasting the local communities taking on responsibility versus the strong central governments favoured by many states. In this model, states become less relevant and people govern through councils. Its programme immediately aimed to be "very inclusive" and people from a range of different backgrounds became involved, including Kurds, Arabs, Assyrians, Syrian Turkmen and Yazidis (from Muslim, Christian, and Yazidi religious groups). It sought to "establish a variety of groups, committees and communes on the streets in neighborhoods, villages, counties and small and big towns everywhere". The purpose of these groups was to meet "every week to talk about the problems people face where they live". The representatives of the different community groups meet 'in the main group in the villages or towns called the "House of the People"'. As a September 2015 op-ed in The New York Times observed:

For a former diplomat like me, I found it confusing: I kept looking for a hierarchy, the singular leader, or signs of a government line, when, in fact, there was none; there were just groups. There was none of that stifling obedience to the party, or the obsequious deference to the "big man"—a form of government all too evident just across the borders, in Turkey to the north, and the Kurdish regional government of Iraq to the south. The confident assertiveness of young people was striking.

The civil laws of Syria are valid in Rojava, as far as they do not conflict with the Constitution of Rojava. One notable example for amendment is the family law, where Rojava proclaims absolute equality of women under the law and a ban on polygamy. For the first time in Syrian history, civil marriage is being allowed and promoted, a significant move towards a secular open society and intermarriage between people of different religious backgrounds.

In 2012, the PYD launched what it originally called the Social Economy Plan, later renamed the People's Economy Plan (PEP). The PEP's policies are based primarily on the work of Abdullah Öcalan and ultimately seek to move beyond capitalism in favor of democratic confederalism. Private property and entrepreneurship are protected under the principle of "ownership by use", although accountable to the democratic will of locally organized councils. Dr Dara Kurdaxi, a Rojavan economist, has said that: "The method in Rojava is not so much against private property, but rather has the goal of putting private property in the service of all the peoples who live in Rojava."

In November 2022, a bombing occurred in Istanbul's Beyoğlu district in Turkey, killing 6 and wounding 81 people in the attack. Some Turkish officials said that they have suspected the PYD for the attack, although this accusation was met with denials, with Mazloum Abdi pointing towards the suspects familial relationships with ISIS membersas well as Free Syrian Army connections. national and International media also expressed concerns about the investigation.

== International relations ==
=== Turkey ===
While the Turkish state now vehemently opposes the PYD, this wasn't always the case. During the early years of the Syrian civil war, Turkish government ministers met PYD leader Salih Muslim several times. Muslim held talks with Turkish officials in July 2013 in regards to its movement for autonomy within Syria. According to some officials, Turkey's demands included that the PYD not seek an autonomous region through violence, not harm Turkish border security, and be firmly opposed to the Syrian government.

The Turkish government's relationship with the Kurds deteriorated during the Siege of Kobanî, when Turkey was accused of facilitating the advance of the Islamic State, leading to the 2014 Kobanî protests. The Kurdish-Turkish peace process broke down soon after, leading to a resumption of the Kurdish-Turkish conflict, this time with a Syrian dimension.

After Turkey changed its view towards the PYD, it characterised it as being the Syrian branch of the PKK. Turkish president Recep Tayyip Erdoğan said that he would not allow the creation of an autonomous area in Syrian Kurdistan.

Since this time, the Turkish government has refused to countenance any PYD presence at the various Syrian peace talks. In August 2016, Erdogan said that "extermination of the PYD" is a policy aim of the government of Turkey. On 20 January 2018, Turkey began Operation Olive Branch against the PYD-governed Afrin Canton in the Autonomous Administration of North and East Syria.

Finland and Sweden's alleged support for the PYD, is one of the points which caused Turkey to oppose Finland and Sweden’s NATO accession bid. PYD was included in the declaration in the trilateral memorandum signed by Turkey, Finland and Sweden during the NATO summit in Madrid on 28 June 2022, but did not define it as a terrorist organization.

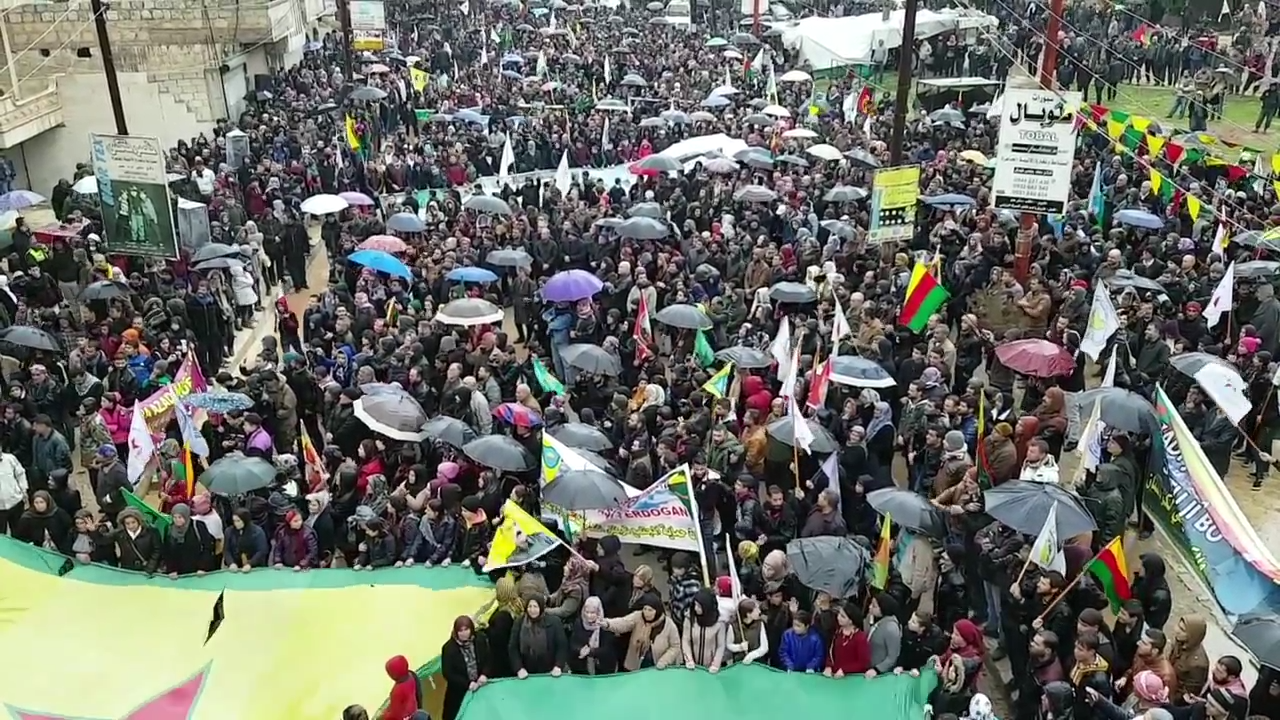
A demonstration in the city of Afrin in support of the YPG against the Turkish invasion of Afrin, 19 January 2018

=== United States ===
While supporting the SDF militarily since the Siege of Kobanî, the United States gives no diplomatic support to the AANES, excluding it from peace talks at the behest of its NATO ally Turkey. While US officials liaise with the PYD, they don't accept its requests for representation at these talks.

By allying itself with PYD, the United States has created tension with the Turkish government, and has had to go out of its way to appease its NATO ally. During his time as president of the United States, Barack Obama had to make a number of personal phone calls to Turkish President Recep Tayyip Erdogan to appease the outraged Turkish leader. What is more, on the 6 November 2018, U.S Deputy Assistant Secretary of State for European and Eurasian Affairs, Matthew Palmer, announced U.S bounties on three leaders of the PKK, Murat Karayilan, Cemil Bayik, and Duran Kalkan. The value of the three bounties combined is $12 million. The announcement of the bounties—a move strongly praised by the Turkish regime—represents a potential conflict in policy, with the U.S fighting alongside YPJ-YPG, while actively looking to capture members of the PKK.

=== Sweden ===
Sweden is an influential actor for the PYD, as Amineh Kakabaveh, an independent MP in the Swedish Parliament struck an agreement with the Social Democratic Party of Sweden which included a certain support for the PYD, thanks to which the Swedish Government of Magdalena Andersson was able to assume.

=== Germany ===
In Germany, there is a ban on PKK symbols that, as of March 2017, is officially extended the YPG and YPJ flags and symbols. Certain German states prosecute German citizens for posting YPJ-YPG symbols on social media, or bringing their flags to protests.

=== Syrian Arab Army ===
The PYD is also accused of working with the Assad government in Syria. This allegation was initially disputed by the PYD and its affiliates, but by 2019, an alliance had been forged by the AANES and the Syrian Arab Army, due to their common enemy in Turkey.

== See also ==
- Kurdistan Democratic Solution Party
