= Osama Hilali =

Osama Hilali Arabic: أسامة الهلالي
- Hilali in November 2012
- Born: 1979 (age 46–47); Qamishli, Hasakah Governorate, Syria
- Children: 2
- Military career
- Allegiance: (Kurdistan Region) (Syrian opposition) Kurdish Future Movement in Syria
- Branch: Free Syrian Army
- Service years: 2012–13
- Commands: Commander of the Mashaal Brigade
- Conflicts: Syrian Civil War; Idlib Governorate clashes (June 2012–April 2013); Raqqa campaign (2012–13); Syrian Kurdish–Islamist conflict (2013–present); Battle of Ras al-Ayn

Osama Suleiman Mansour Hilali (Arabic: أسامة سليمان منصور الهلالي, born 1979) is a member of the Kurdish Future Movement in Syria. He was also an activist who led protests during the Syrian uprising in 2011, and a militant who founded the Mashaal Brigade, an armed rebel group that consisted of both Arabs and Kurds. Under Hilali's command, the group fought against Syrian government forces and the mainly-Kurdish People's Protection Units (YPG) between 2012 and 2013, during the Syrian Civil War, most notably in the Battle of Ras al-Ayn.

== Early life ==
Hilali was born in 1979 in the city of Qamishli, in the northern Hasakah Governorate of northeastern Syria. He went to school until the 9th grade, after which worked as a painter. His friends, some of whom were politically active, taught him to read and write in Kurdish. Hilali visited the graves of Cigerxwîn and Muhammad Sheikh once. He moved to Saudi Arabia in 2005, before returning to Qamishli in 2008 to open an art supply store with his father.

Before the Syrian Civil War, Hilali was involved in a dispute between his sister and her husband. During the incident, Hilali killed his brother-in-law with a knife, which he claimed was done in self-defence. In an interview with KurdWatch in March 2013, Hilali claimed that after the war ends, he would turn himself in to a civil and "impartial" court for the murder.

== Syrian Civil War ==
=== Organizing protests ===
With the outbreak of the Syrian uprising in March 2011, Hilali joined with other activists to organize anti-government protests in Qamishli. One of the locations where protests were organized was Qamishli's main mosque, near which Hilali's store was located. He supplied water, food, and paint to protesters from his store. During the protests, he met with members of the Kurdish Future Movement, and founded the Sun of Freedom Movement with other protest organizers in the city. On 30 April, Hilali and another activist were arrested by security forces. After his release some time later, he joined the Kurdish Future Movement. He was arrested again on 31 August 2011.

During the summer of 2012, Hilali was known for carrying water cans and spraying other protesters with water. The pro-government Addounia TV accused him of adding narcotic substances to the water to incite protesters. This claim gave Hilali the nickname "Freedom Pesticide". He was detained by the Military Intelligence Directorate for 15 days, and by riot police at the end of July for 10 days. Hilali and two of his friends also shot at the house of a neighbouring man they accused of shooting at the air to disperse protests.

Hilali was accused of shooting and killing his brother Huzan in the Corniche neighbourhood of Qamishli on 11 June 2012. After the murder, he fled and reportedly went into hiding in the house of Abdul Aziz Tammo, brother of Kurdish Future Movement founder and leader Mashaal Tammo, who was assassinated in Qamishli on 7 October 2011, in Darbasiya. By August, Hilali had ended his practice of water sprays and moved on to create banners and participate in local council trainings in both the Hasaka and Deir ez-Zor governorates. During the same month he stepped on a land mine on the Syria–Turkey border during a trip with another Kurdish Future Movement member to Turkey, and was hospitalized for the next two months.

=== Turn to militant activities ===
After his release from hospitalization, Hilali left his wife and two daughters (Rama and Raghad) in Qamishli to join the armed rebellion. He first joined a Free Syrian Army group in the Hama, Idlib, and Aleppo governorates, and was wounded during fighting in Idlib. Other fighters in the group reportedly made a Kurdish flag for him. After the rebel capture of Tell Abyad in September 2012, Hilali moved there and established the Mashaal Brigade, named after Mashaal Tammo. Hilali contacted other fighters in Aleppo and Idlib to join his group, and made Ras al-Ayn its base after other rebel groups captured it from government forces in November.

On 19 November 2012, clashes erupted between the YPG and other rebels in Ras al-Ayn, with Hilali's group joining the fight against the YPG, resulting in 4 of his fighters being killed on the first day. By March 2013, the Mashaal Brigade numbered around 50 fighters, including between 10 and 36 in Ras al-Ayn, 25 in Tell Abyad, and 10 in Tell Hamis. The fighters included an Iraqi who fought against the United States Armed Forces in Fallujah as part of Jeish Muhammad. The Firat News Agency (ANF), affiliated with the Democratic Union Party (PYD), which oversaw the YPG, called Hilali and members of his group terrorists and mercenaries, and accused him of allying with Islamist extremist groups and facilitating their entry into Kurdish areas. The ANF also claimed that many Kurdish youth defected from the Mashaal Brigade and joined the YPG. Hilali denied cooperation with al-Qaeda's al-Nusra Front, whose headquarters was a street away from his, and claimed that his group only worked with the FSA's Hasaka Revolutionary Military Council. The HRMC negotiated a ceasefire with the YPG on 17 February, but tensions between the Mashaal Brigade and the YPG remained high. In July, fighting in Ras al-Ayn renewed, and the YPG expelled al-Nusra and other rebel groups, including the Mashaal Brigade, from the city. Ras al-Ayn then became a flashpoint of the conflict between the Kurdish YPG and its allies on one side and al-Nusra, the Islamic State of Iraq and the Levant (ISIL), and other Salafi jihadist militant groups on the other.

The ANF accused the Mashaal Brigade of meeting with ISIL, al-Nusra, and Ahrar al-Sham in an attempt to capture Rmelan from the YPG on 16 July 2013. After being expelled from Ras al-Ayn, Hilali headed to Raqqa. There, he was captured by ISIL, imprisoned, and tortured for 40 days, reportedly for being too secular. He was released and stayed in the jihadist-controlled town of al-Yaarubiyah, on the northern Iraq–Syria border, for a month. He then returned to Tell Abyad, and was again arrested by ISIL in December 2013. He was once again released and reportedly fled to Graz in Austria.
