= Al-Manajir =

al-Manajir المناجير
- Town
- Location of al-Manajir in Syria
- Coordinates: 36°41′7″N 40°11′52″E
- Country: Syria
- Governorate: al-Hasakah
- District: Ras al-Ayn
- Subdistrict: Ras al-Ayn

Population (2004)
  - Total: 12,156
- Time zone: UTC+3 (AST)
- Geocode: C5017

al-Manajir (Arabic: المناجير, Kurdish: مەناجیر, romanized: Menacîr), often referred to as Manajir, Manajer or Manjar, is a town in northwestern al-Hasakah Governorate, northeastern Syria. At the 2004 census, al-Manajir had a population of 12,156.

== Geography ==
al-Manajir lies on the right (southern) bank of the Khabur River in the midst of the fertile agricultural area of the Upper Khabur Valley, located around 20 kilometres (12 mi) southeast of Ras al-Ayn and 15 kilometres (9.3 mi) west of Tell Tamer. It administratively belongs to the Ras al-Ayn Subdistrict.

== History ==
al-Manajir had an Assyrian majority with Kurdish and Arab minorities, until in 1973 Syrian president Hafez al-Assad commenced a large-scale settlement program, systematically settling Bedouins in the areas bordering Iraq and Syria to weaken the demographic dominance of the Kurds and keep the area under tighter control. After the best plots of land were redistributed to settlers of the Baggara tribe, it is said that most of the original inhabitants left the village.

=== Civil war ===
During the civil war, the region of Manajir has remained heavily contested between late 2012 and mid-2015.

Attacked by FSA rebels and allied Islamist fighters, the Syrian Army withdrew from its positions in Ras al-Ayn by the end of November 2012. The long Battle of Ras al-Ayn commenced, eventually leading to the Kurdish YPG taking control on 17 July 2013.

==== Kurdish capture of Manajir ====
In their subsequent Ras al-Ayn offensive, the YPG further advanced down the Khabur River area. In a final rush in early November, they captured one village after the other. On 5 November 2013 they successfully finished their offensive by capturing ISIS fighters to fully take control of Manajir.

==== Battle of Manajir ====
The rebel fighters however weren't ready to give in. With Baggara leader Nawaf al-Bashir purportedly supporting them from his exile in Turkey, foreign fighters were joined by local Arabs and fellow tribesmen from further south.

Early in the morning of 25 January 2014, a VBIED detonated at a YPG checkpoint near Manajir, killing two Kurdish and an Arab YPG fighter. The suicide bombing was immediately followed by an attack by Islamic State fighters with T-55 tanks. While ISIS and its allies lost 23 fighters, the YPG reportedly didn't suffer any further casualties, after reinforcement units of the YPG and YPJ turned the tide. It however turned out that some of the attackers were already in the village, obviously received by local people.

==== Upper Khabur valley attack ====
On 21 February 2015, the YPG launched the Eastern al-Hasakah offensive, purging Jihadists from areas east of al-Hasakah. Two days later, the Islamic State answered with a revenge attack on dozens of villages in the Upper Khabur valley south of Tell Tamer, mostly with an ethnic Assyrian majority. In March, the Islamic State extended the attacks to the north, advancing into Kurdish-held areas around Manajir. Eventually however, they were defeated and pushed back by YPG forces which solidified the control over Manajir by Kurdish forces.
