= Ras al-Ayn Subdistrict =

Ras al-Ayn Subdistrict ناحية مركز رأس العين Nahiye Serê Kaniyê
- Subdistrict
- Location of Ras al-Ayn Subdistrict within al-Hasakah Governorate

- Location in Syria
- Country: Syria
- Governorate: al-Hasakah
- District: Ras al-Ayn District
- Seat: Ras al-Ayn

Area
  - Total: 2,832.02 km^{2} (1,093.45 sq mi)

Population (2004)
  - Total: 121,536
  - Density: 42.9150/km^{2} (111.149/sq mi)
- Geocode: SY080400

Ras al-Ayn Subdistrict (Arabic: ناحية مركز رأس العين; Kurdish: Nahiye Serê Kaniyê) is a subdistrict of Ras al-Ayn District in western al-Hasakah Governorate, northeastern Syria. The administrative centre is the city of Ras al-Ayn. In 1907, Mark Sykes mentioned a nomadic Kurdish tribe called the Sartan living near Ras al-Ayn.

At the 2004 census, the subdistrict had a population of 121,536.

== Cities, towns and villages ==
Cities, towns and villages of Ras al-Ayn Subdistrict
PCode	Name	Population
C4988	Ras al-Ayn	29,347
C5017	al-Manajir	12,156
C5027	Mabrouka	6,325
C5021	Qattinah	4,736
C5005	Tell Abu Ra'sayn	4,390
C5002	Tell Halaf	4,274
—N/a	Tell Safah	3,578
C4992	al-Amirit	3,182
C5025	Masjid	2,944
C5013	Tell Sinan Sharqi	2,272
—N/a	Muthanna	2,183
—N/a	Jan Tamur Sharqi	2,176
—N/a	Barqa	1,901
C4989	Al-Safh Ras al-Ayn	1,854
C5011	Tell al-Ward Gharbi	1,757
C5009	Assadiya	1,674
—N/a	Tell al-Arqum	1,430
C5020	Arada Kabira	1,415
C5019	Arshet Ras al-Ayn	1,327
C5007	Rawya	1,316
C5023	Modan	1,236
—N/a	Bistan	1,187
C5000	Abu Jarada Kabir	1,180
C4987	Kabsh	1,179
C4997	Ahras	1,092
C5015	Tal Elamir	1,011
C4986	Dahmaa	1,009
—N/a	Al-Alea al-Sharqiya	995
—N/a	Al-Mutanabi	981
C4995	Thamud	978
C4984	Siwan	974
—N/a	?	941
—N/a	?	939
C5024	Mjeibreh	880
—N/a	?	870
C5018	Salhiyeh Mala Khader	866
C5003	Rabiat Gharbi	863
—N/a	?	860
C4994	Um Harmala	827
C4998	Abu Shakhat	792
C4990	Tal Harmal	763
C5006	Um Elasafir	725
C5022	Kisreh	716
C4993	Zaydiyeh Ras El Ein	663
C5016	Dawoodiyeh	634
—N/a	Al-Alea al-Gharbia	630
C4985	Hakimeh	601
C4999	Dardara	579
—N/a	Kharma	554
C5010	Kherbet Hamid	513
C4991	Abdel Salam Gharbi	469
C5012	Tal Sheer Ras al-Ayn	428
C4996	Ajla	425
C5014	Shara	417
—N/a	?	414
—N/a	?	348
—N/a	Sukariyeh	338
—N/a	?	332
C5026	Mbarkiyeh	322
—N/a	?	321
—N/a	?	309
C5001	Tal Baydar Ras al-Ayn	245
—N/a	?	228
—N/a	?	222
C5004	Kherbet Jamu	165
—N/a	?	140
—N/a	?	138
