= Abu Rasin =

Coordinates: 36°50′49″N 40°19′46″E

Abu Rasin أبو رأسين
- Town
- Interactive map of Abu Rasin
- Country: Syria
- Governorate: Al-Hasakah
- District: Ras al-Ayn
- Subdistrict: Abu Rasin
- Elevation: 360 m (1,180 ft)
- Area code: +963

Abu Rasin (Arabic: أبو رأسين) is a town in Syria and serves as the administrative center of the Abu Rasin Subdistrict in the Ras al-Ayn District of Al-Hasakah Governorate. The town is located approximately 25 kilometers east of the city of Ras al-Ayn and west of the Zarqan River, a tributary of the Khabur River. Abu Rasin is neighbored by a tell, which dates back to the early 20th century.

The local population primarily works in agriculture, cultivating field crops, vegetables, and fruit trees, in addition to raising livestock. The town also functions as a local market serving the surrounding villages of the Abu Rasin Subdistrict. Abu Rasin is situated at an elevation of approximately 360 meters above sea level.

== Notable people ==
- Asaad al-Shaibani (born 1987), Ministry of Foreign Affairs and Expatriates
