= Battle of Ras al-Ayn (2019) =

Battle in the Syrian civil war

Second Battle of Ras al-Ayn
- Part of the Syrian Civil War and the 2019 Turkish offensive into north-eastern Syria
Date	9 October 2019 – 20 October 2019 (1 week and 4 days)
Location	Ras al-Ayn, Hasakah Governorate, Syria 36°51′N 40°04′E
Result	Turkish Armed Forces and Allies victory: Turkish Armed Forces and Allies besiege Ras al-Ayn; SDF withdraws from the town under the ceasefire deal; Turkish Armed Forces and Allies capture Ras al-Ayn

Belligerents
Turkey; Syrian National Army	Autonomous Administration of North and East Syria

Units involved
Turkish Armed Forces; Air Force; Land Forces; Syrian National Army; Ahrar al-Sharqiya; 123 Brigade	Syrian Democratic Forces; People's Protection Units; Serê Kaniyê Military Council; Northern Democratic Brigade

Casualties and losses
Unknown	Unknown
- 33 civilians killed (per SOHR)

The Second Battle of Ras al-Ayn occurred during the 2019 Turkish offensive into north-eastern Syria, as part of the Rojava conflict of the Syrian Civil War. The battle was fought between Turkish Armed Forces and the Turkish-backed Syrian National Army (SNA) against the Syrian Democratic Forces (SDF). The battle resulted in the capture of Ras al-Ayn/Serê Kaniyê by Turkish/SNA forces on 20 October, and the incorporation of the town under the Turkish occupation of northern Syria.

== Background ==
The battle began with the start of the 2019 Turkish offensive into north-eastern Syria on 9 October 2019. Turkish forces and their rebel allies the Syrian National Army, also known as the Turkish-backed Free Syrian Army (TFSA), targeted two border towns, Ras al-ayn and Tell Abyad, 120 kilometres to its west.

== Battle ==
=== Initial advances ===
Turkish and TFSA forward troops crossed into Syria, moving close to Ras Al-Ayn on 9 October. The town was initially targeted by artillery and aerial bombing by the Turkish Air Force, which resulted in some of the civilian population fleeing the area, heading south. Reinforced Turkish units proceeded to move towards the town later in the day.

=== Turkish forces enter Ras al-Ayn ===
On 12 October, more Turkish and TFSA forces attacked and entered Ras al-Ayn, with some reports stating that Turkish troops had advanced into the center of the town. The SDF conducted a tactical retreat, pulling back in response to a Turkish artillery bombardment of their positions. Clashes continued in the industrial district as Turkish forces continued to advance into the town, gaining control of the residential center, with some Turkish media sources stating that the town had been completely captured. However, SDF troops released video of themselves still in the town, continuing to engage the Turkish forces. Around this time, Kurdish politician and secretary general of the Future Syria Party Hevrin Khalaf, alongside a number of unarmed civilians, was captured on a road by Ahrar al-Sharqiya fighters and executed outside the town. On 13 October, a convoy of SDF supporters and international media was attacked while attempting to enter Ras al-Ayn to show support. The Syrian Observatory for Human Rights (SOHR) said Turkish war planes had attacked the column, killing 14 people and injuring 10.

=== SDF counteroffensive ===
On 13 October, the SDF launched a counter-offensive, pushing back Turkish forces and recapturing key points of the town, including the industrial district. By 15 October, the SDF had fully recaptured the town and repelled attacks from four groups of the TFSA, according to SOHR. The SDF had built extensive tunnel networks under Ras al-Ayn prior to the Turkish incursion and used them to launch attacks on Turkish and TFSA units in the town.

=== Siege and ceasefire ===
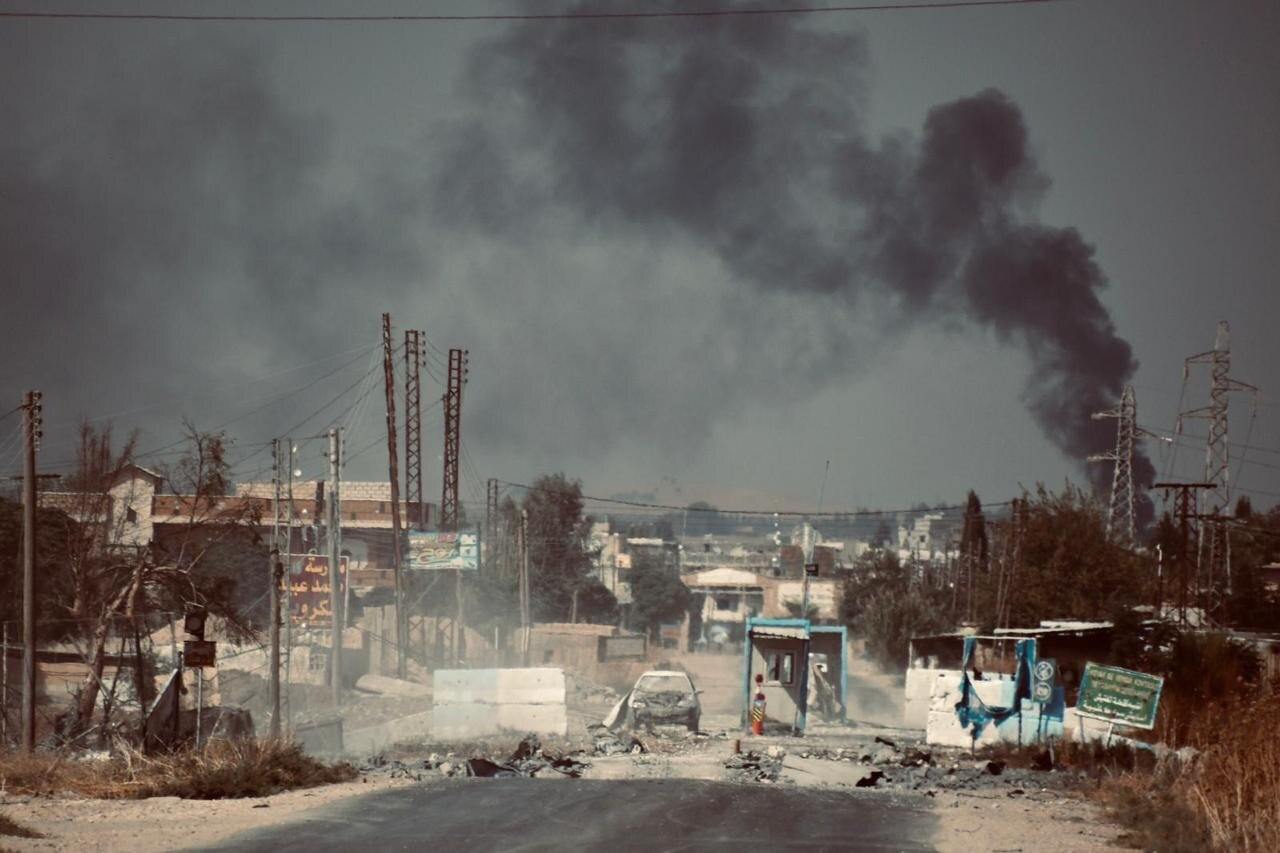
A checkpoint, abandoned by the SDF outside of Ras al-Ayn following Turkish airstrikes on 11 October.

On 17 October, amid heavy clashes, Turkish and TFSA forces completely besieged and captured half of Ras al-Ayn after encircling the town and cutting off all roads leading to it, according to SOHR.

Later in the day, the United States government and Turkey agreed to a five-day ceasefire deal to allow the SDF to withdraw from the 20 mile safe-zone on the Syria–Turkey border. The SDF said they only accepted the ceasefire in the area between Tall Abyad and Ras al-Ayn, and rejected withdrawing from the entire 20 mile area and transferring the territory to Turkey, calling the effort an occupation. Clashes continued in Ras al-Ayn despite the ceasefire, with both sides accusing each other of violating the ceasefire. Kurdish Red Crescent ambulances reported they could not reach the town to evacuate the wounded SDF fighters on the first day of the ceasefire. Around this time, a Turkish airstrike wounded five civilians, who were then evacuated to al-Hasakah where Syrian medics showed to the media burns on the victims that they said were consistent with the use of white phosphorus. Turkey rejected accusations it used white phosphorus.

On 18 October, a large convoy of 80 cars and 400 civilians, including the Free Burma Rangers and people who had traveled from Derik, Qamishli, Tell Tamer, and al-Hasakah, attempted to reach Ras al-Ayn to provide humanitarian aid. According to the SDF, the convoy was blocked from entry by TFSA fighters. In the afternoon, the SDF said an aid convoy had been let through, after having been prevented from entering the town since earlier in the day.

Around this time, Syrian Army units confronted the Turkish and TFSA units near Ras Al-Rayn for the first time, with reports by the media that they could join the battle on the side of the SDF, potentially lifting the siege of the city.

On 20 October, the Kurdish Red Crescent were allowed into the town and evacuated 30 injured people, both civilians and soldiers. The medical team stated that the town was running low on supplies. The hospital itself had come under attack in an attempt by the TFSA to capture it. International fighters with the SDF saw combat, and at least one German national died in the battle defending the hospital.

=== SDF withdrawal ===
On 20 October, three days after Ras al-Ayn was fully encircled, the SDF announced they would be withdrawing from the town to comply with the US-brokered deal with Turkey. Some SDF forces began withdrawing, accompanied by some of the civilian residents who fled in fear of the Turkish-allied militias. The SDF commander who announced the deal said the SDF would withdraw back to the 30 km area imposed by the ceasefire conditions only after the civilians and soldiers were allowed to evacuate from Ras al-Ayn. Despite the ceasefire, the town was still sporadically shelled and occasional gunfights broke out. SDF troops completely withdrew from Ras al-Ayn by the end of 20 October, with an SDF spokesperson saying that no SDF troops were left inside the town. 86 vehicles left the town, taking SDF troops to Tell Tamer, located about 40 kilometres south of Ras al-Ayn, alongside a few hundred civilians. Turkish and TFSA units officially captured the town later in the day.

== Alleged white phosphorus use ==
Allegations that illegal weapons had been used by TFSA forces were raised by medical teams treating civilians, who had been hit by Turkish allied forces weaponry in Ras Al-Ain on the 17th of October. A number of civilians, who had been evacuated to the nearby town of Hasakah to be treated at the Hospital, showed signs consistent with White Phosphorus burns. The civilians had the burn marks on both their faces and torso, and were first and second degree burns. Intentionally using white phosphorus against civilians, can be construed as a war crime. UN investigators collected evidence in order to investigate the claims. The Turkish Government denied it was a chemical attack, stating that they had no chemical weapons in their inventory. The situation was made worse for the wounded by the fact there were few medical centres left in Ras Al-Ain that could treat people. The Organisation for the Prohibition of Chemical Weapons (OPCW) made moves to investigate the attack, but eventually did not start an investigation, stating that White Phosphorus is a heat based weapon rather than chemical, and so outside its remit. There was some criticism of the OPCW, with allegation that it was biased based on the fact it received donations from Turkey.

== See also ==
- Battle of Ras al-Ayn (2012–13)
