= Hasakah Subdistrict =

Hasakah Subdistrict ناحية مركز الحسكة Nahiye Hesekê
- Subdistrict
- Location of Hasakah Subdistrict within al-Hasakah Governorate

- Location in Syria
- Country: Syria
- Governorate: al-Hasakah
- District: Hasakah District
- Seat: al-Hasakah

Area
  - Total: 2,509.56 km^{2} (968.95 sq mi)

Population (2004)
  - Total: 251,570
  - Density: 100.24/km^{2} (259.63/sq mi)
- Geocode: SY080000

Hasakah Subdistrict (Arabic: ناحية مركز الحسكة; Kurdish: Nahiye Hesekê) is a subdistrict of al-Hasakah District in central al-Hasakah Governorate, northeastern Syria. The administrative centre is the city of al-Hasakah. It has a mixed population of Kurds, Assyrians, and Arabs. Most of the subdistrict is part of the Autonomous Administration of North and East Syria, apart from an enclave of Hasakah city, which has remained under the control of the Ba'athist Syrian government since the beginning of the Syrian civil war.

At the 2004 census, the subdistrict had a population of 251,570.

== Cities, towns and villages ==
Cities, towns and villages of al-Hasakah Subdistrict
| PCode | Name | Population |
|---|---|---|
| C4360 | al-Hasakah | 188,160 |
| C4351 | al-Tweinah | 5,062 |
| —N/a | Western Tell Tawil | 3,109 |
| C4354 | Safya | 2,849 |
| C4378 | Qaber Amer | 2,205 |
| C4343 | Tal Majdal | 2,153 |
| C4365 | Eastern Hamra | 2,088 |
| C4361 | Eastern Rajman | 1,950 |
| C4347 | Western Sabe Skur | 1,860 |
| —N/a | —N/a | 1,676 |
| —N/a | —N/a | 1,597 |
| C4366 | Um Elmilh | 1,566 |
| —N/a | —N/a | 1,443 |
| C4340 | Kherbet Elias | 1,348 |
| C4349 | Salaliyeh | 1,298 |
| —N/a | —N/a | 1,204 |
| C4334 | Um Qasir Almjarjaa | 1,153 |
| C4369 | Sayed Ali | 1,130 |
| C4346 | Rafraf | 1,022 |
| C4371 | Tal Baydar Haskeh | 958 |
| —N/a | Karama | 936 |
| —N/a | —N/a | 910 |
| —N/a | —N/a | 860 |
| —N/a | —N/a | 826 |
| C4367 | Ein Elhara | 790 |
| C4374 | Rehiyeh Nameh | 774 |
| C4368 | Sulaymaniya | 753 |
| —N/a | —N/a | 731 |
| —N/a | —N/a | 725 |
| C4364 | Um Elmaez | 715 |
| —N/a | —N/a | 688 |
| —N/a | —N/a | 683 |
| C4344 | Um Elshok | 642 |
| —N/a | —N/a | 642 |
| C4376 | Qubbet Elsokhur | 594 |
| —N/a | —N/a | 571 |
| C4373 | Zaydiyeh Hasskeh | 563 |
| C4380 | Msheirfet Elashmal | 518 |
| C4381 | Mahd Elrijleh | 511 |
| C4357 | Masudiyeh Haska | 480 |
| C4348 | Duwadiyeh Haskeh | 478 |
| C4370 | Southern Lower Um Hajra | 465 |
| C4355 | Um Eldibis Elhiskeh | 462 |
| —N/a | Noman | 445 |
| C4341 | Abu Rasin Haskeh | 426 |
| C4350 | Hafayer | 405 |
| —N/a | —N/a | 373 |
| C4362 | Matl | 364 |
| —N/a | —N/a | 359 |
| C4336 | Razaza | 352 |
| —N/a | —N/a | 341 |
| —N/a | —N/a | 327 |
| C4331 | Khazneh | 313 |
| —N/a | —N/a | 311 |
| C4359 | Eastern Taban | 308 |
| C4377 | Nurak | 308 |
| C4363 | First Mabtuh | 306 |
| —N/a | —N/a | 253 |
| —N/a | —N/a | 249 |
| —N/a | —N/a | 244 |
| C4382 | Masudiyeh Elbizara | 227 |
| C4358 | Tal Mansur Haskeh | 218 |
| —N/a | —N/a | 214 |
| —N/a | —N/a | 207 |
| —N/a | —N/a | 206 |
| —N/a | —N/a | 204 |
| —N/a | —N/a | 201 |
| —N/a | —N/a | 199 |
| C4383 | Western Qamar | 198 |
| —N/a | —N/a | 198 |
| —N/a | —N/a | 186 |
| C4337 | Madina | 181 |
| C4372 | Tal Shaalan | 181 |
| —N/a | —N/a | 180 |
| C4332 | Um Hajra Almoqbela | 173 |
| —N/a | —N/a | 173 |
| —N/a | —N/a | 166 |
| —N/a | —N/a | 163 |
| —N/a | —N/a | 159 |
| —N/a | —N/a | 157 |
| —N/a | —N/a | 152 |
| C4339 | Sofya | 150 |
| —N/a | —N/a | 150 |
| C4338 | Shama | 149 |
| —N/a | —N/a | 149 |
| C4356 | Lower Tal Aswad | 148 |
| —N/a | —N/a | 145 |
| —N/a | —N/a | 141 |
| —N/a | —N/a | 140 |
| —N/a | —N/a | 135 |
| —N/a | —N/a | 132 |
| C4379 | Qaber Elkhalif | 126 |
| —N/a | —N/a | 125 |
| C4335 | Jdideh | 124 |
| C4342 | Talaah | 121 |
| —N/a | —N/a | 121 |
| C4353 | Harmala | 115 |
| C4352 | Upper Tal Aswad | 106 |
| —N/a | —N/a | 105 |
| —N/a | —N/a | 86 |
| —N/a | —N/a | 82 |
| C4375 | Hilaliyeh | 65 |
| C4333 | Rahmaniya | 62 |
| —N/a | Kherbet Elfaras | 49 |
| —N/a | —N/a | 34 |
| —N/a | —N/a | 23 |
| —N/a | —N/a | 9 |
| —N/a | —N/a | 3 |
| | Umm al Quşayr | |

== Civil war ==
Following the Battle of Shaddadi in February 2013, in which the city of Al-Shaddadah came under the control of al-Nusra Front, the southern parts of Al-Hasakah Subdistrict also fell to Nusra. The Islamic State of Iraq and the Levant (ISIL) took over from al-Nusra Front in the area, and pushed northwards up to the boundary of Hasakah city, culminating in the 2015 Battle of al-Hasakah. ISIL were finally driven from the district in the Al-Shaddadi offensive (2016).

=== Kawkab military base ===
Surrounding Mount Kawkab (Arabic: تلة كوكب, at 36.536251°N, 40.858276°E) was the largest military base of the governorate, which has remained in the hands of the Syrian Arab Army throughout the war until the fall of the Assad regime. ISIS attacked the base without success in July 2014 and October 2015.
