= Battle of Ras al-Ayn (2012–13) =

Part of the Syrian Civil War

- Part of the Hasaka campaign of the Rojava-Islamist conflict, in the Rojava conflict of the Syrian Civil War
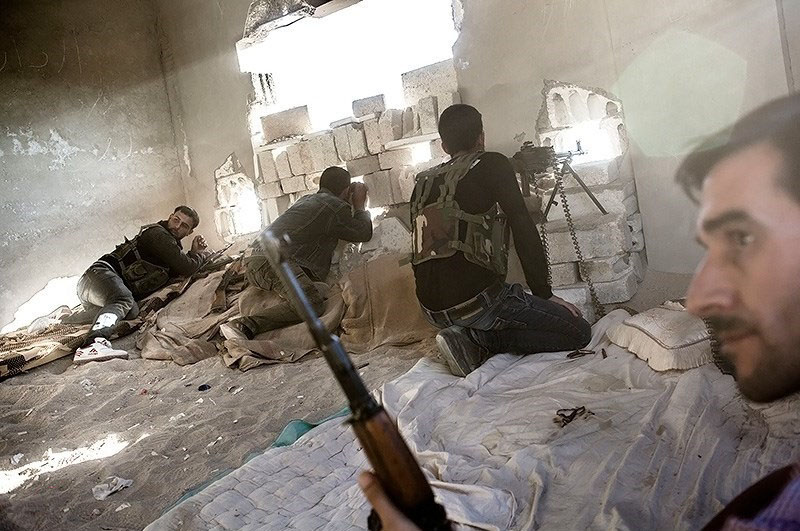
- Kurdish fighters of the People's Protection Units (YPG) in combat with other militants in Ras al-Ayn
Date	8 November – 17 December 2012 (first phase); 17 January 2013 – 19 February 2013 (second phase); 16–20 July 2013 (third phase)
Location	Ras al-Ayn, Syria 36°51′N 40°04′E
Result	YPG-led victory: The Syrian Army retreated from the city in December 2012; City was divided between Islamist/FSA-controlled and YPG-controlled parts from 2012 to 2013; In July 2013, the YPG expelled the Islamists from Ras al-Ayn

Belligerents
Rojava (under the DBK): People's Protection Units (YPG); Women's Protection Units (YPJ) (third phase)	(Syria) Syrian Arab Republic: Syrian Arab Armed Forces; National Defense Forces	(Syrian opposition) Free Syrian Army: al-Nusra Front; Ghuraba al-Sham; Islamic State of Iraq and the Levant (from July 2013)

Commanders and leaders
Jamshid Khabat Ibrahim (top YPG commander in Ras al-Ayn); Juan Ibrahim (YPG) "Dijwar" (Martyr Erdal Brigade)	(Syria) Yusuf al-Abdullah (Abu Jabal Brigade) (Syria) Hawas Jammo (Brigade of the Free Patriots)	(Syrian opposition) Hassan al-Abdullah (FSA Hasaka Military Council top commander); Hassan Aboud (FSA Hasaka Military Council) (Syrian opposition) Nawaf Ragheb al-Bashir (FAEL) (Syrian opposition) Osama Hilali (Mashaal Tammo Brigade) (Syrian opposition) Sheikh Hamad (Ahrar al-Jazeera); Fahd al-Gaad (al-Nusra Front); Abu Ahmed (al-Nusra Front)

Units involved
See order of battle	See order of battle	See order of battle

Strength
400 militiamen (Nov. 2012)	c. 200 militiamen (Abu Jabal Brigade)	1,500–2,000 total (Feb. 2013): Al-Nusra Front: 200 fighters; Ghuraba al-Sham: 100 fighters, 3 tanks (Nov. 2012)

Casualties and losses
40+ killed	38 killed	122–148 killed
- 20 civilians killed

The Battle of Ras al-Ayn (8 November 2012 – 20 July 2013) was a series of armed clashes for control of the town of Ras al-Ayn (Kurdish: Serê Kaniyê) during the Syrian Civil War, mainly between the Kurdish-majority People's Protection Units (YPG) and an alliance of Syrian opposition groups (including Al-Nusra Front and the Free Syrian Army), with the occasional involvement of the Syrian Armed Forces. As result of the battle's first phase, the Syrian Arab Army was expelled from the city by Syrian rebels, whereupon the latter attacked the YPG-affiliated fighters in Ras al-Ayn. In the following months, the city was effectively divided into rebel-held and YPG-held areas, with intermittent fighting resulting in the gradual expansion of the YPG's territory in the city and its surroundings. Islamist factions soon became dominant among the rebels in the region, further contributing to tensions with the secular-leftist YPG. In July 2013, the battle's final phase erupted and ended when an alliance of YPG-led troops (including Syrian government loyalists) completely expelled the rebels from Ras al-Ayn.

== Battle ==
=== First phase ===
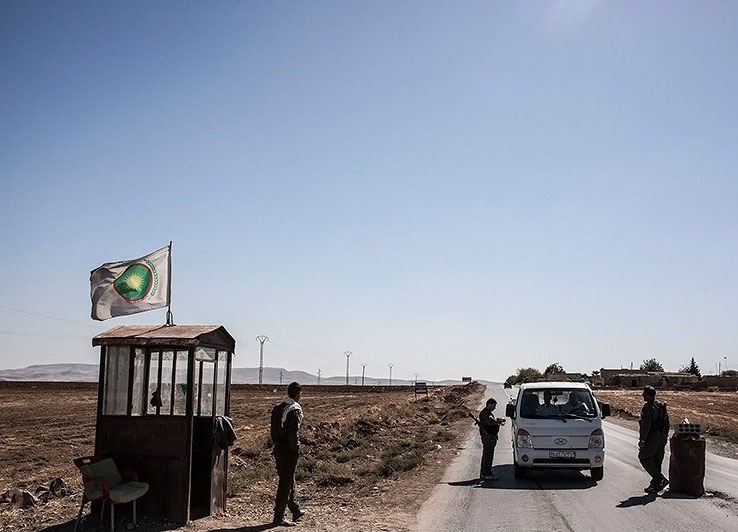
YPG checkpoint near Ras al-Ayn, showcasing the flag of the Kurdish Supreme Committee (DBK).

==== First week ====
After months of increasing tensions, numerous rebel units of the Free Syrian Army (FSA), along with allied jihadist forces of Al-Nusra Front and Ghuraba al-Sham, launched an assault on Ras al-Ayn on 8 November 2012. At the time, the town was still mostly under Syrian Arab Army control, though the Kurdish-majority Democratic Union Party (PYD) and their militia People's Protection Units (YPG) had also established a presence in Ras al-Ayn. An al-Kurdiya News correspondent on the ground claimed that local Kurds aided the FSA in the attack. The insurgents launched their assault from Tell Halaf and a Turkish city, Ceylanpınar. According to Turkish journalist Mehmet Aksakal, the clashes possibly were the result of growing dissatisfaction between the Kurdish National Council (KNC) and PYD. However, another Kurdish activist claimed that even though the YPG was in the city, it did not participate in clashes. Around 10-26 rebels and 20 Syrian soldiers were killed in the fighting, while about 8,000 residents fled to Ceylanpınar as fighting raged.

The battle for Ras al-Ayn put the PYD in a difficult position. On one side, it was opposed to the government due to the latter having repressed it and any Kurdish rights activism for a long time. At the same time, however, the rebels of the FSA and its Islamist allies were also hostile toward the PYD. The party consequently opted to use the fighting between its two opponents to its advantage. It stayed out of the combat in Ras al-Ayn, avoiding the rebels there and limiting itself to the city's Kurdish districts, while taking over several settlements in the wider area as the government and rebels were distracted. On 10 November, militiamen of the YPG, aided by local Kurds, stormed the last government security and administrative stations in the towns of al-Darbasiyah (Kurdish: Dirbêsî) and Tel Tamer. This attack was prompted by violence in Ras al-Ayn. This left only the two largest cities of al-Hasakah Governorate - al-Hasakah and Qamishli - in government hands. The following day, the Syrian Air Force and Syrian Army began to bombard Ras al-Ayn. The attacks, carried out by fighter jets, helicopters, and artillery, killed at least 16 people and caused most local civilians to flee the town.

On 13 November, YPG militia forced out the remaining government security forces units from the town of al-Malikiyah (Kurdish: Dêrika Hemko), in order to prevent the FSA from having an excuse to launch an attack like in Ras al-Ayn.

==== Second week ====
On 15 November, the rebels declared that they had taken full control of Ras al-Ayn, capturing or killing the last remaining Syrian Army soldiers stationed there. Government airstrikes in the town stopped for the first time in three days, as government forces appeared to have given up trying to retake it. Though the FSA claimed the victory for itself, the jihadists of Al-Nusra Front and Ghuraba al-Sham were in fact the dominant force among the rebels. As result, the town was effectively divided into Islamist-controlled and PYD-controlled parts.

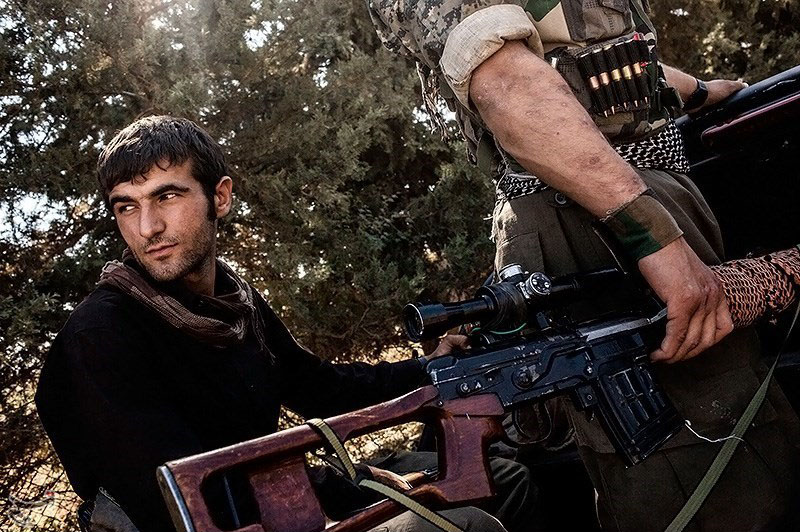
YPG fighters in Ras al-Ayn

On 19 November, the jihadists, and the FSA launched an assault on a YPG checkpoint in Ras al-Ayn that initially left six rebels dead. The rebels also assassinated Abed Khalil, the president of the local PYD council, when a sniper shot him dead. The next day it was reported by SOHR that the death toll in the jihadist-YPG fighting in the town had reached 34. 29 of the dead were members of Al-Nusra Front and the Gharba al-Sham battalion. The other five included four Kurdish fighters and Khalil. The four Kurdish fighters were reportedly executed after being captured by the rebels. The opposition activist group the LCC put the number of dead at 46: 25 YPG and 20 FSA fighters, and the PYD official. 35 Kurds and 11 FSA fighters were captured by both sides. The same day, members of Al-Nusra Front and Ghuraba al-Sham opened fire on a YPG checkpoint, sparking clashes that killed dozens of people, including at least three rebel leaders. A Kurdish activist stated that the presence of hostile Islamist fighters had alienated Kurdish locals. Both the Kurdish National Council and top FSA commander General Riad al-Asaad condemned the clashes, with the KNC calling the presence of rebel fighters in the town "pointless and unjustifiable", and al-Asaad attributing the violence to "some groups trying to exploit the situation in order to blow up relations between Kurds and Arabs" while expressly denying any FSA affiliation with Ghuraba al-Sham.

As a result of the fighting, there was a buildup in the number of forces deployed by both sides in Ras al-Ayn.

==== Third week ====
By 22 November, Kurdish forces had strengthened their numbers to around 400 militiamen, who faced 200 fighters from Al-Nusra Front and 100 fighters from Ghuraba al-Sham, supported by three captured Syrian Army tanks.

On 22 November, SOHR reported that eight members of Al-Nusra Front and one YPG fighter were killed in fighting for Ras al-Ayn. At this point, the fighting had claimed an estimated 54 lives. The next day, however, a tenuous two-day ceasefire was announced between Kurdish fighters and Al-Nusra Front and Ghuraba al Sham in order to determine terms of a possible permanent agreement between the two sides. Prior to this announcement, the PYD claimed that its forces had killed 25 rebels, wounded 20 more, and destroyed three vehicles. Negotiations on 24 November resulted in a fragile truce that lasted only until 6 December, when clashes broke out once again.

==== Fourth week ====
On 3 December, air raids conducted by the Syrian Air Force on a police station and old post office in the Mahatta neighbourhood killed twelve and injured dozens more. Among the dead were six Kurds, three of them children. Ambulances from Turkey took at least 21 of the wounded to a hospital in the predominantly Kurdish town of Ceylanpınar across the border. Turkey scrambled a number of F-16 fighter jets based at Diyarbakir in response to the strikes.

==== Fifth week ====
From 12 to 14 December, rebels conducted a series of rocket attacks on the town. It was reported that they had also tried and failed to expand fighting to the nearby towns and villages.

=== First ceasefire ===
Negotiations between rebels and the PYD-led Kurdish forces resumed on 15 December. An agreement was reached the next day, and on 17 December a ceasefire took effect between local Kurdish militias and Arab rebels. Under the terms of the ceasefire, both sides were to withdraw from the city, share checkpoints surrounding it, and transfer its administration to local civilian Kurds, Arabs, Chechens, and Christians. But though fighting had ended, fighters on both sides failed to withdraw, raising concerns about the strength of the truce.

Signs of improved relations between the PYD and the rebels emerged at the YPG's first plenary meeting in al-Malikiyah from 1 to 5 January 2013. In addition to organising their military command structure, the PYD members at the meeting stressed "the unity of the struggle of the Syrian people" and the importance of having good relations with the Arab opposition. Significantly, they raised the flag of the Free Syrian Army next to the PYD flag; prior to this, YPG units were known for kidnapping and intimidating individuals and groups who displayed the flag in their territory. Despite this, the peace only enjoyed wider support among the FSA groups among the Arab rebels. In contrast, Al-Nusra Front and Ghuraba al-Sham had invested far less in the negotiations, and remained willing to resume hostilities. Furthermore, neither the Kurdish forces nor the rebels upheld the agreement to fully withdraw their armed troops from Ras al-Ayn. Nevertheless, the ceasefire initially held, and Al-Nusra Front even set up joint checkpoints with the YPG.

=== Second phase ===
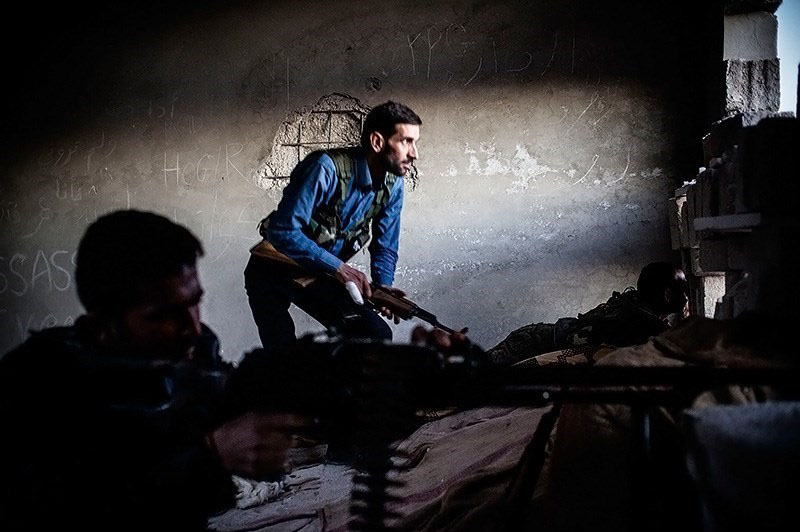
YPG fighters battle Al-Nusra Front in the city.

On 17 January 2013, it was reported that about 300 rebel fighters crossed into Ras al-Ayn at dawn from the Syrian/Turkish border and fierce clashes between rebel and Kurdish forces was underway. During the fighting, the Kurds captured one of three jihadist tanks that came in from the border. Three PYD and seven rebel fighters were killed in the clashes. Rebel leader Nawaf Ragheb al-Bashir accused the YPG of breaking the ceasefire by opening fire on and killing 15 of its fighters.

By 19 January, 33 people lost their lives in the fighting. 28 of them were rebel jihadists and five were Kurdish militiamen.

In more fighting on 21 January, a Kurdish commander and 20 rebels were killed, along with four civilians.

On 22 and 24 January, two more Kurdish commanders were killed, while on 25 January, two rebels and one Kurdish fighter were killed. Kurdish refugees fleeing the fighting accused the rebels of having "no respect" for Kurdish civilians still living in the town. Also on 25 January, FSA members in Ras al-Ayn kidnapped four members of the Azadî Party, a Kurdish party politically opposed to the PYD, and demanded the release of a prisoner held by the PYD.

On 28 January, rebels attacked the governorate building and the police building in the city, resulting in heavy clashes. By the next day, Kurdish forces had captured several buildings which were being used as strongpoints by the rebels. That evening, a large number of rebels reportedly crossed over from Turkey as clashes intensified; rebel numbers were allegedly dwindling prior to these reinforcements. Five rebels were seriously wounded in clashes, with one dying in a Turkish hospital soon after, and an additional three or four fell in combat with Kurdish groups. Their bodies were reportedly buried in Turkey. Two days later, it was reported that YPG forces captured an ambulance with French tags and carrying documents written in French. The YPG accused Turkey of using ambulances to shuttle arms and equipment to Arab rebels fighting against Kurds in the city.

By 30 January, the YPG had pushed rebels back from parts of the city, claiming the recapture of an Assyrian Christian church. On that day, FSA members kidnapped, tortured, and killed a member of the Kurdistan Democratic Party of Syria (commonly referred to as "el-Partî"), which is part of a bloc of Kurdish parties politically opposing the PYD. When relatives and el-Partî members sought to bring the body to a coroner's office in al-Darbasiyah, they were refused passage at a YPG checkpoint. The man was buried the following day in the village of Faqira.

=== Second ceasefire ===
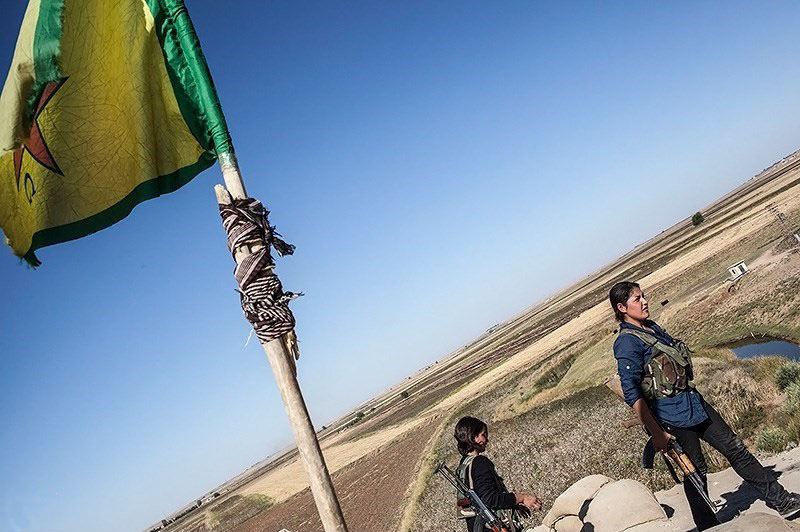
Female Kurdish fighters manning a checkpoint near Ras al-Ayn.

Despite the breakdown of the first ceasefire, efforts continued to bring peace back to the town. On 23 January, Syrian opposition members formed an eight-member committee to serve as a mediator between the PYD/YPG and Arab rebels. One member of the Kurdish National Council, a bloc of opposition Kurdish parties largely sympathetic to the mainstream Arab opposition, was included on the committee. In early February, talks began to attempt to establish a second ceasefire between Arab rebels and the YPG, temporarily halting fighting. Members of the Kurdish Supreme Committee met with delegates from the Arab opposition to discuss the terms of the agreement, which was planned to be applicable to the entirety of Syrian Kurdistan and not just Ras al-Ayn. Nevertheless, some Kurdish activists were skeptical that both warring sides desired such an agreement, while the FSA-aligned Arab Revolutionary-Military Council in Hasakah Province refused any truce with Kurdish fighters, stating that it only would accept the mainstream Syrian opposition to control the region.

Michel Kilo, a Christian member of the Syrian opposition, presided over much of the negotiations. Bitter disagreements were reported during the negotiation process, which seemed close to failure on several occasions. The FSA-affiliated Revolutionary Military Council in Hasakah Province demanded that the town and border crossing be handed over to the sole political control of the SNC, that FSA-affiliated fighters be the only force exercising military control in the town, that the PYD submit to the SNC as the sole legitimate governing force in the region, and that the display of Kurdish flags in Hasakah Province be prohibited. Kurdish parties flatly rejected these conditions, proposing instead that fighters from both parties leave the city, transferring its administration to a joint council composed by political representatives from both sides.

On 19 February, a new agreement was announced between Arab rebels, including FSA groups, and YPG fighters in Ras al-Ayn following a weeklong truce. The terms of the agreement stipulated the withdrawal of all foreign fighters from the town, the establishment of joint FSA-YPG checkpoints which will allow for greater freedom of movement in and out of the town, the creation of a democratic local council tasked with the administration of the town and its border crossing, the planned future establishment of a cooperative Arab-Kurdish police force in the town, and—most significantly—the cooperation between the YPG and FSA to fight together against government forces in the region. In its signing the agreement, the FSA acted on behalf of all Arab rebel groups in the area except for Jabhat al-Nusra and Ghuraba al-Sham, who agreed separately to abide by the agreement. Michel Kilo stated that most of the fighters from both sides withdrew in a timely fashion. Nevertheless, some activists remained dismissive of the strength of the agreement, expressing doubts over the willingness of Islamists—particularly Ghuraba al-Sham—to respect Kurdish rights in the region. One Kurdish activist stated, "Either side can break the agreement at any moment ... The FSA military council is not strong in the area, and its leadership has made contradicting statements in the past. From my point of view, this accord is empty."

Three days after the agreement was signed, FSA commander-in-chief Salim Idris rejected it, citing the PYD's connections to the PKK and Iraqi and Iranian Kurdish groups in his decision. Analysts believed that the repudiation was designed to placate Turkey, who had been actively supporting Arab rebels fighting the Kurds in Ras al-Ayn.

=== Third phase ===
Map of the final battle

The third phase of the battle erupted when Jabhat al-Nusra militants surrounded a unit of female YPJ fighters near Ras al-Ayn on 16 July, and arrested the group's driver. The YPG/YPJ consequently mobilized their forces, deployed reinforcements to the town, and started a number of raids on key Jabhat al-Nusra positions. Seeing a chance to take revenge on the insurgents, about 200 fighters of the Abu Jabal Brigade (an Arab government loyalist unit) joined the Kurds in their attack. After a night of fighting, the YPJ driver was freed, and the YPG had captured Al-Nusra Front's local headquarters. By 17 July, the jihadists had mostly been expelled from the town, and the YPG/YPJ soon after took control of the border crossing with Turkey. Eleven people were killed during this phase of the fighting, including nine jihadist and two Kurdish fighters. The YPG/YPJ consequently advanced into the countryside to establish a defensive ring around Ras al Ayn, encountering heavy resistance. By 20 July, the Kurdish-led forces had secured the town and its surroundings.

== Strategic analysis ==
According to PYD leader Salih Muslim Muhammad, Arab rebel control of Ras al-Ayn would have two effects. First, it would isolate Kurdish pockets in Aleppo Province from the main area in Hasakah Province, giving the FSA and its affiliates more leverage over the PYD/YPG. Second, it would secure a vital supply line from Turkey that could potentially enable Arab rebels to seize control over greater parts of Syria's east, including the city of Hasakah itself. Rebel leader Nawaf Ragheb al-Bashir, a prominent Arab tribal figure from Hasakah Province who has engaged in disputes with Kurds in the past, stated that his forces "will not allow the separatists to control [Hasakah] province because it is the richest part of Syria in terms of oil and agriculture".

The PYD routinely accused Turkey of supporting Arab rebels fighting against their YPG units in Ras al-Ayn. Arab rebel leaders publicly confirmed Turkish support for the Syrian rebels.

With the collapse of government control over Ras al-Ayn, some local government loyalists decided to cooperate with the Kurdish forces: The Brigade of the Free Patriots under Hawas Jammo officially joined the YPG on 2 November 2013, while the Abu Jabal Brigade under Yusuf al-Abdullah merged with the YPG on 24 December.

== Order of battle ==
=== Kurdish Supreme Committee (DBK) forces ===
- People's Protection Units (YPG)
  - Martyr Erdal Brigade
  - Martyr Abid Battalion
  - PDPKS volunteers
- Women's Protection Units (YPJ)

=== Pro-government forces ===
- Syrian Arab Armed Forces
  - Syrian Arab Army
  - Syrian Air Force
- National Defence Forces
  - Abu Jabal Brigade
  - Brigade of the Free Patriots

=== Rebels ===
- (Syrian opposition) Free Syrian Army
  - (Syrian opposition) Revolutionary Military Council of Hasaka
    - (Syrian opposition) Ahfad al-Rasul Brigades
    - Katibat Ahrar Gouran
    - Liwa al-Nasser
  - (Syrian opposition) Farouq Brigades
  - Ahrar al-Jazeera
  - (Kurdistan Region) Azadî Battalion
  - Mashaal Tammo Brigade
  - Ummah Brigade
  - Al-Jazeera and Euphrates Liberation Front
  - Ayad al-Fahri Battalion
- Al-Qaeda
  - al-Nusra Front
  - Ghuraba al-Sham
- Islamic State of Iraq and the Levant (from July 2013)

== See also ==
- Battle of Ras al-Ayn (2019)
