= Kurdish Red Crescent =

Syrian humanitarian organisation

Heyva Sor a Kurdistanê e.V.
- Formation: 1993
- Type: Nonprofit organization
- Purpose: Humanitarian
- Headquarters: Troisdorf, Germany
- Region served: Autonomous Administration of North and East Syria
- Website: https://www.heyvasor.org/ https://hskurd.org/?lang=en https://hskurd.org/?lang=en

The Kurdish Red Crescent (Kurdish: Heyva Sor a Kurdistanê) is a humanitarian nonprofit organisation legally registered as a German eingetragener Verein operating mainly in the Autonomous Administration of North and East Syria and is headquartered in Germany. It is the primary provider of medical care and aid for refugees who have fled from attacks by the Islamic State and the Syrian and Turkish governments. It has also been involved in the reconstruction of Kobanî, which was largely destroyed after months of fighting with the Islamic State.

== Activities ==
The organization was founded in 1993 in Bochum and currently has fundraising branches in several European countries, including Germany, Sweden and the United Kingdom where the organisation is registered as a charity. During the Siege of Kobanî, the Kurdish Red Crescent called for international medical and humanitarian aid, as well as for medical personnel to return to Kobanî to help as there has been a lack of clean water and sewage treatment in the area due to damage. In 2019, the Kurdish Red Crescent received a €250,000 donation from the German political party Die PARTEI.

In northeastern Syria, the Kurdish Red Crescent currently has branches in Kobanî, Al-Darbasiyah, Tel Tamer, Al-Hasakah, Qamishli, Amuda, Al-Qahtaniyah, Al-Malikiyah, Al-Muabbada, Sheikh Maqsood, as well as the Al-Hawl, Newroz and Roj refugee camps. There were also branches in Afrin and Ras al-Ayn before the capture of these towns by Turkey and the Turkish-backed Free Syrian Army. The Kurdish Red Crescent has six main projects for its activities in northeastern Syria: "The Children's Project", "The Sibling Family Project", "The Health Project", "The Emergency Aid Project", "The Prisoner Solidarity Project", and "The Project for Cooperation with Like-Minded Aid Organisations".

== International recognition ==
The Kurdish Red Crescent is not currently recognized by the International Federation of Red Cross and Red Crescent Societies (IFRC). To be recognized an organization has to be the only official aid society in an independent state that has ratified the Geneva Conventions, and the Autonomous Administration of North and East Syria is not currently internationally recognized as an autonomous region nor an independent state. In 2010, the Supervisory and Service Directorate of the State of Rhineland-Palatinate in Germany ruled that the Kurdish Red Crescent could not use the Red Crescent or the Red Cross symbols because only one state-authorized aid society in each state is permitted to use that logo and therefore the organization cannot collect donations in Rhineland-Palatinate.

There is some pragmatic cooperation on the ground between the IFRC and the Kurdish Red Crescent, as for example concerning IFRC detention visits to prisoners held by the region's authorities. Existing pragmatic cooperation between the IFRC and the Kurdish Red Crescent were at least partially upset by the Turkish expansion into certain areas in 2019.

== See also ==
- International Red Cross and Red Crescent Movement
- Autonomous Administration of North and East Syria
- Movement for a Democratic Society
- Syrian Democratic Forces
- People's Protection Units
