= Al-Tweinah =

al-Tweinah التوينة
- Town
- Location of al-Tweinah in Syria
- Coordinates: 36°33′28″N 40°38′56″E
- Country: Syria
- Governorate: al-Hasakah
- District: al-Hasakah
- Subdistrict: al-Hasakah

Population (2004)
  - Total: 5,062
- Time zone: UTC+3 (AST)
- Geocode: C4351

Al-Tweinah (Arabic: التوينة) is a town in central al-Hasakah Governorate, northeastern Syria.

Administratively the town belongs to the Nahiya al-Hasakah of al-Hasakah District. At the 2004 census, it had a population of 5,062.
