= Umm al Quşayr, Al-Hasakah =

Village

Coordinates: 36°33′N 40°35′E

Umm al Quşayr (Arabic: م القصير) is a village in Al-Hasakah District, Al-Hasakah Governorate, Syria.
