= Kurdish Future Movement in Syria =

Kurdish Future Movement in Syria Şepêla Pêşeroj a Kurdî li Sûriyê
- Arabic name: تيار المستقبل الكردي في سوريا
- Founder: Mashaal Tammo
- Founded: May 29, 2005
- Ideology: Secularism; Liberalism; Syrian Kurdish interests
- Political position: Centre
- National affiliation: Kurdish National Council
- People's Assembly: 0 / 210

The Kurdish Future Movement in Syria (Arabic: تيار المستقبل الكردي في سوريا, Kurdish: Şepêla Pêşeroj a Kurdî li Sûriyê) is a liberal Syrian Kurdish political party established in 2005 by Mashaal Tammo, who in 2011 was assassinated. Following internal leadership battles, the party has suffered a split, with both factions continuing to exist under the same name.

== Party history ==
=== Founding years and the Syrian Civil War ===
The Kurdish Future Movement was founded on 29 May 2005 by Syrian Kurdish politician Mashaal Tammo pursuant to the Syrian Committee for the Revival of Civil Society, and the Bedir Khan Cultural Forum of Qamishli. Earlier than most of the other Kurdish parties, the party established a relationship with the Syrian Arab opposition.

In August 2008, Tammo was arrested and charged with "committing aggression and arming Syrians to start civil war," a charge he denied. In June 2011, inmidst the 2011 civil uprisings, Tammo was released from prison. Having represented the party on an Istanbul meeting of the Syrian opposition on 16 July, he took part in the foundation process of the Syrian National Council (SNC), making the Future Movement the only Kurdish member party actively committed to the SNC. Tammo however withdrew his party's support from the founding conference's final declaration, given that it didn't recognize Syria's Kurdish people.

The Kurdish Future Movement has strong relations with Kurdish youth groups and has been actively involved in dissident demonstrations and protests since the beginning of the uprising. In fact, members of the Kurdish opposition have accused the Kurdish Future Movement of focusing excessively on the revolution, while failing to uphold and defend Kurdish interests.

In contrast to the majority of Kurdish parties in Syria, the Kurdish Future Movement does not see the Kurdish question as a regional matter. It doesn't call for Kurdish self-determination but for full participation in the new government based on proportional representation, and it demands recognition of the Kurdish people as a main, rather than second, ethnicity in Syria.

=== Party split after Tammo's assassination ===
Having survived a first assassination attempt in August, Mashaal Tammo was however killed on a second attempt November 11 in Qamishli. Rezan Bahri Shaykhmus, chairman of the party's Office of General Communications, blamed the Syrian intelligence services having killed founding leader Tammo, and indeed in October 2012, TV network Al Arabiya published leaked files indicating that Tammo was assassinated by the Air Force Intelligence Directorate and upon presidential order by Bashar al-Assad.

Since Tammo's death, the Kurdish Future Movement suffered from internal leadership battles. On July 6, 2012, the party split in two when some twenty people convening a general assembly in Qamishli declared the chairman Rezan Bahri Shaykhmus to be deposed and replaced him with an alternative successor Jangidar Muhammad. As Shaykhmus' supporters didn't recognize the elections, there are currently two parties known as the Kurdish Future Movement in Syria.

On its October 17 to 19, 2014 congress in Istanbul, the Shaykhmus-wing of the Kurdish Future Movement elected the previous European representative Siamend Hajo as chairman. The party also decided to create a military wing in order to protect civilians in the Kurdish regions. Otherwise the party decided to work covertly in Syria in order to avoid persecution by the Assad government and the PYD.

Rasheed Muhammad, a member of the Future Movement, was also a member of the local council in the town of Al-Dirbasiyah, Hasaka Governorate. On 1 April 2017, he was arrested by PYD-led self-management forces.
