= European Center for Kurdish Studies =

Organisation in Germany

The European Center for Kurdish Studies (German: Europäisches Zentrum für Kurdische Studien, EZKS) is an organization based in Germany and was established in order to facilitate and support the Kurdish studies program at the Free University of Berlin. It was founded on 1 September 1999. The center is led by Eva Savelsberg who is its chairwoman and Siamend Hajo who is its treasurer; both were also the content managers of KurdWatch, which reported about the human rights situation mainly in Syrian Kurdistan until 2016. KurdWatch was another project of the EZKS besides the ones of the Kurdish lectures at the FU Berlin and a library concerning Kurdish issues. The center can be described as close to the Kurdish National Council. As a representative of the EZKS, Eva Savelsberg participates in several talk shows such as at Deutsche Welle and its findings are also included in reports of TRT World and the Foundation for Political, Economic and Social Research (SETA) or the National Coalition of Syria.
