= Al-Darbasiyah Subdistrict =

Coordinates: 36.9058°N 40.5886°E

Al-Darbasiyah Subdistrict ناحية الدرباسية
- Subdistrict
- Location of Al-Darbasiyah Subdistrict within al-Hasakah Governorate

- Location in Syria
- Country: Syria
- Governorate: al-Hasakah
- District: Ras al-Ayn District
- Seat: al-Darbasiyah

Area
  - Total: 994.17 km^{2} (383.85 sq mi)

Population (2004)
  - Total: 55,614
  - Density: 55.940/km^{2} (144.88/sq mi)
- Geocode: SY080401

Al-Darbasiyah Subdistrict (Arabic: ناحية الدرباسية) is a subdistrict of Ras al-Ayn District in northern al-Hasakah Governorate, northeastern Syria. The administrative centre is the city of al-Darbasiyah.

At the 2004 census, the subdistrict had a population of 55,614.

== Cities, towns and villages ==
Cities, towns and villages of al-Darbasiyah Subdistrict
PCode	Name	Population
C5054	al-Darbasiyah	8,551
—N/a	Umm Dibs	4,223
—N/a	al-Lid	3,684
C5056	Tall Tishrin	1,921
—N/a	al-Qirwan	1,661
—N/a	Qaramaniyah	1,361
C5049	Dakuk	1,091
C5064	Tartab	1,079
—N/a	Shatt el-Arab Sharqi	973
—N/a	Khass Janubi	887
—N/a	?	863
—N/a	Bir al-Hajar	861
—N/a	al-Madiq	754
C5067	Upper Tal Ghazal	711
—N/a	Ennabiya	707
—N/a	al-Musharifah Darbasiyah	673
—N/a	?	645
C5032	Dabash	629
—N/a	?	572
—N/a	Ghanamiyah Darbasiyah	560
C5055	Jole	530
C5030	Quneitra	500
—N/a	?	497
—N/a	?	494
—N/a	?	491
C5072	Farfara Derbasiyeh	488
—N/a	?	485
—N/a	?	481
C5038	Tal Aylul	476
C5062	Rashidiyeh Derbasiyeh	468
C5033	Khazneh	456
C5051	Mashquq	448
—N/a	?	424
C5065	Mahmudiyeh	422
C5041	Jatal	410
C5046	Shmuka Gharbia	397
—N/a	?	391
—N/a	?	371
C5073	Malak	363
—N/a	?	352
—N/a	?	342
C5057	Saadia Derbasiya	341
C5059	Tal Karam Tahtani	338
C5070	Salhiyeh Sharqiya	329
—N/a	?	328
—N/a	?	320
C5069	Tal Khabbaz	314
—N/a	Sawadiya	302
C5075	Habu	301
—N/a	?	295
C5058	Abu Kala	293
—N/a	?	290
—N/a	?	287
—N/a	Ammuriyeh	286
C5040	Tal Dik	283
C5048	Khatuna	278
—N/a	?	278
—N/a	?	267
—N/a	?	263
—N/a	?	260
C5077	Mishraq	259
—N/a	?	258
—N/a	?	250
C5034	Abu Jarada	249
—N/a	?	248
C5060	Torat	245
—N/a	?	242
—N/a	Jinan	236
C5043	Rihaniyet Shamr	226
C5039	Tal Baqar	220
C5028	Second Jozat	204
—N/a	?	198
C5042	Ethamiyeh Sharqia	197
—N/a	Qasr	191
C5036	Salam	190
C5035	Harshawiyeh	189
—N/a	?	179
C5076	Fath Allah	176
C5045	Tal Abbud	176
C5047	Dalawi	172
—N/a	?	172
C5061	Kukh	164
C5031	Treifawi	164
—N/a	?	163
C5053	Um Elshawali	158
C5052	Um Ayash Fawqani	158
C5037	Hamadaniyeh	157
C5071	Fatima al-Maghribia	155
C5063	Bsheiriyeh	153
—N/a	Hamidiyeh	152
—N/a	?	152
—N/a	?	151
—N/a	?	147
C5068	Heno	146
—N/a	?	145
C5044	Ethamiyeh Gharbia	138
—N/a	?	137
—N/a	?	124
—N/a	?	119
—N/a	?	108
—N/a	?	107
—N/a	?	105
—N/a	?	99
—N/a	?	95
—N/a	?	91
—N/a	Baath	81
—N/a	?	81
—N/a	?	80
—N/a	?	71
C5074	Eastern Fatima	64
C5029	Turbeh	52
C5066	Jdideh	50
C5050	Tal Sukkar	25
