= Mabrouka =

Mabrouka مبروكة
- Town
- Location within Syria
- Coordinates: 36°39′15″N 39°45′38″E
- Country: Syria
- Governorate: al-Hasakah
- District: Ras al-Ayn
- Subdistrict: Ras al-Ayn

Population (2004)
  - Total: 6,325
- Time zone: UTC+3 (AST)

Mabrouka (Arabic: مبروكة) is a town in al-Hasakah Governorate, Syria. According to the Syria Central Bureau of Statistics (CBS), Mabrouka had a population of 6,325 in the 2004 census.
