= Mashaal Tammo =

Syrian Kurdish politician (1958–2011)

- مشعل تمو
- Born: Mashaal Tammo; 1958
- Died: October 7, 2011 (aged 52–53)
- Cause of death: Assassination
- Other name: Mash'al Tammo
- Occupations: Politician, Activist
- Organization: Kurdish Future Movement
- Known for: Kurdish rights activism, Political leadership
- Notable work: Founder of Kurdish Future Movement
- Political party: Kurdish Future Movement
- Movement: Syrian revolution, Kurdish political movement
- Opponent: Syrian Government
- Children: Fares Tammo

Mashaal Tammo, also Mash'al Tammo (Arabic: مشعل تمو, romanized: Mashʿal Tammo, Kurdish: مشەل تەمۆ, romanized: Mişel Temo; 1958 – October 7, 2011) was a Syrian Kurdish politician and activist who supported the interests of the minority of the Kurds.

Tammo was released in 2010 after spending more than three years in jail. Founding the liberal Kurdish Future Movement party he angered both the government and rivals in the Kurdish community. His outspoken vision towards a pluralistic democratic Syria, in which Kurds would take part just the way all other Syrians do, dismissed any kind of regional autonomy as demanded by most other Kurdish parties. This even led him to dissociate his party from the Syrian Kurdish political scene. When he met with representatives from the major Kurdish parties in Syria following his release from prison, he announced to them that "he did not belong to the Kurdish movement, but was a part of the Syrian revolution." When the other politicians asked him to reconsider, he refused to do so and withdrew the Future Movement from the Kurdish Patriotic Movement umbrella alliance. Though he later tried to rejoin the alliance, the other parties blocked any such action.

He was also a member of the executive committee of the newly formed Syrian National Council, a broad-based front bringing together opposition figures inside and outside the country in an attempt to unify the deeply fragmented dissident movement.

== Assassination ==
In the turmoil of the 2011 Syrian uprising, Tammo was assassinated by masked men who burst into an apartment and gunned him down on 7 October 2011. The next day, more than 50,000 mourners marched through Qamishli in a funeral procession for him. Security forces fired into the crowds, killing five people. Tammo's son, Fares Tammo, has urged Syria's Kurds to throw their support behind the revolt, telling the New York Times: "My father's assassination is the screw in the regime's coffin. They made a big mistake by killing my father."

The Syrian government blamed "armed terrorists" and an "international Conspiration against Syria“. The Kurdistan Workers' Party, however, accused the government in Turkey of carrying out the assassination stating that "this assassination against a Kurdish politician [was] carried out by Turkey. Turkey already has a very profound history record of political assassinations on the Kurdish people and other ethnic backgrounds, both in Turkey and in the region." In October 2012, Saudi-owned TV channel Al-Arabiya claimed that Bashar al-Assad himself had engaged the Air Force Intelligence Directorate to assassinate Tammo.

== Legacy ==
At least two Syrian Kurdish Free Syrian Army units adopted names in honor of Mashaal Tammo: The small Mashaal Tammo Brigade under Osama Hilali unsuccessfully fought against the YPG during the Battle of Ras al-Ayn; while a unit in eastern Ghouta was known as Martyr Meshaal Temmo Brigade until its ideology changed to radical Islamism, whereupon it changed its name to Mujahid Osama bin Laden Brigade. A "Martyr Mashaal Tammo Brigade" under Abu Maryam al-Hasakawi also took part in the Turkish military operation in Afrin in 2018 as a subunit of the Sultan Murad Division before the al-Hasakawi was arrested and his grouped renamed as the 213th Brigade, though it is not known if this unit is related to the aforementioned two.

== Bibliography ==
- Khatib, Lina; Eaton, Tim; Haid, Haid; Hamidi, Ibrahim; Kodmani, Bassma; Phillips, Christopher; Quilliam, Neil; Sinjab, Lina (2017). Western Policy Towards Syria: Applying Lessons Learned (PDF). London: Chatham House.
