= Ghuraba al-Sham =

- غرباء الشام
- Leader: Mahmud al-Aghasi (2003–2007)
- Dates active: 2003–2013
- Active regions: Syria; Lebanon; Iraq
- Ideology: Sunni Jihadism
- Wars: Iraq War, 2007 Lebanon conflict and Syrian civil war

Ghuraba al-Sham (Arabic: غرباء الشام Ghurabā' ash-Shām, "Strangers of the Levant ") was a group of jihadists of Turkish and former Eastern bloc origin who smuggled foreign fighters to Iraq, intervened in Lebanon during the 2007 Lebanon conflict, and fought in Syria during the Syrian civil war. The group coordinated with Al-Nusra Front in clashes with the People's Protection Units during the Battle of Ras al-Ayn in November 2012 and in January 2013. The group apparently shut down or disappeared in 2014.

== Structure ==
The group was founded by Aleppo preacher Mahmud al-Aghasi, who was also known as Abu al-Qaqa. He was often accused by Syrian opposition parties of working for the Mukhabarat and during the 2007 Lebanon conflict he was known as the Godfather of Fatah al-Islam. The group was widely believed by many Lebanese people to be smuggling fighters to Iraq during the Iraqi insurgency and later to the Nahr al-Bared refugee camp to help Fatah al-Islam under the alleged auspice of the Syrian government. Abu al-Qaqa was killed in Aleppo by a former prisoner who was held by Americans during the Iraq War on 28 September 2007. Members of the group were recruited in Syria and sent to Iraq to fight during the Iraq War.

== See also ==
- List of armed groups in the Syrian Civil War
