= KurdWatch =

Former human rights organization

KurdWatch was a human rights monitoring organization, mainly focusing on human rights abuses against the Kurdish population of Syria. The organization was based in Berlin, Germany. KurdWatch is closely associated with the European Center for Kurdish Studies; the content managers of KurdWatch were Eva Savelsberg and Siamend Hajo who are also members of the board of the European Center for Kurdish Studies. On 8 September 2016, KurdWatch announced that they were ending their activities after seven years, since they do not have access to funds anymore.

The group reported on daily political events, such as arrests or trials, and research background information, for example on the structure of Kurdish political parties in Syria, and the daily life in the Kurdish settled areas of Syria. The group has interviewed the Kurdish Democratic Union Party (PYD) leader Salih Muslim. However, according to Barak Barfi, the group was known for being critical of the PYD.
