= Ras al-Ayn District =

Ras al-Ayn District منطقة رأس العين Navçeya Serê Kaniyê
- District
- Location of Ras al-Ayn District within al-Hasakah Governorate

- Location in Syria
- Coordinates (Ras al-Ayn): 36.85°N 40.07°E
- Country: Syria
- Governorate: al-Hasakah
- Seat: Ras al-Ayn
- Subdistricts: 2 nawāḥī

Area
  - Total: 3,826.19 km^{2} (1,477.30 sq mi)

Population (2004)
  - Total: 177,150
  - Density: 46.299/km^{2} (119.91/sq mi)
- Geocode: SY0804

Ras al-Ayn District (Arabic: منطقة رأس العين, romanized: manṭiqat Raʾs al-ʿAyn; Kurdish: Navçeya Serê Kaniyê) is a district of al-Hasakah Governorate in northeastern Syria. The administrative centre is the city of Ras al-Ayn.

At the 2004 census, the district had a population of 177,150. It is populated by Arabs, Kurds, Chechens and Assyrians.

== Subdistricts ==
The district of Ras al-Ayn is divided into two subdistricts or nawāḥī (population as of 2004):

Subdistricts of Ras al-Ayn District
PCode	Name	Area	Population	Villages	Seat
SY080400	Ras al-Ayn Subdistrict	2,832.02 km^{2}	121,536	67	Ras al-Ayn
SY080401	al-Darbasiyah Subdistrict	994.17 km^{2}	55,614	113	al-Darbasiyah
