= Al-Dirbasiyah =

Al-Dirbasiyah الدرباسية Dirbêsiyê
- Town
- Location in Syria
- Coordinates: 37°4′22″N 40°39′7″E
- Country: Syria
- Governorate: al-Hasakah
- District: Ras al-Ayn
- Subdistrict: al-Darbasiyah
- Elevation: 300 m (980 ft)

Population (2004 census)
  - Total: 8,551
- Time zone: UTC+3 (AST)
- Area code: 52

Al-Dirbasiyah (Arabic: ٱلدَّرْبَاسِيَّة, romanized: ad-Dirbāsīyah, Kurmanji Kurdish: Dirbêsiyê) is a Syrian town on the Syria–Turkey border opposite the Turkish town of Şenyurt. Administratively it is part of the Al-Hasakah Governorate. According to the Syria Central Bureau of Statistics (CBS), al-Dirbasiyah had a population of 8,551 in the 2004 census. It is the administrative center of a nahiyah ("subdistrict") consisting of 113 localities with a combined population of 55,614 in 2004. The majority of the inhabitants of the town are Kurds while Arabs and Assyrian are a minority.

It is connected by road to Tell Beydar in the south.

== Etymology ==
The town of Dirbasiyah is named after St Osyo the Wise, the Saint patron of the city, with "Dirbasiyah" being the Arabized version of the Syriac name, meaning "The path (Darbo) of Osyo (Asiyah)". A church is dedicated to this saint in this city.

== History ==
According to al-Mas'udi, the town was the stronghold of the Kurdish Kikan tribe.

== Civil war ==
On 22 July 2012, during the Syrian Civil War, Kurdish-led YPG forces took control over the town, after Syrian government forces, following an ultimatum issued by the YPG, withdrew from it. The town was thus brought into the AANES. The Syrian Army entered the town in October 2019, as part of the Second Northern Syria Buffer Zone Agreement.

On 16 July 2020, an unknown UAV suspected to be Turkish carried out a strike against a Russian coordination point south of al-Dirbasiyah. Two Russian soldiers, one SAA member and two members of the Asayish were injured in the strike.

== Notable people ==
- Ferhad Şamî, Kurdish military leader
