= Ras al-Ayn =

Ras al-Ayn رأس العين Serê Kaniyê
- City
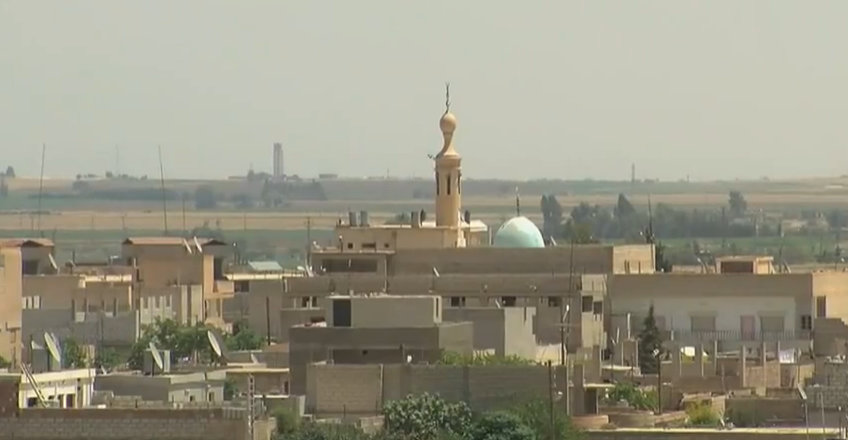
- Ras al-Ayn

- Location of Ras al-Ayn in Syria
- Coordinates: 36°51′01″N 40°04′14″E
- Country: Syria
- Governorate: al-Hasakah
- District: Ras al-Ayn
- Subdistrict: Ras al-Ayn
- Elevation: 360 m (1,180 ft)

Population (2004)
  - Total: 29,347
- Time zone: UTC+3 (AST)
- Area code: +963 52
- Geocode: C4988

Ras al-Ayn (Arabic: رَأْس ٱلْعَيْن, romanized: Raʾs al-ʿAyn, Kurmanji Kurdish: Serê Kaniyê or Serêkaniyê, Classical Syriac: ܪܝܫ ܥܝܢܐ, romanized: Rēš Aynā), also spelled Ras al-Ain, is a city in al-Hasakah Governorate in northeastern Syria, on the Syria–Turkey border. It is also known in English by variations of its Kurdish-language name, such as Serekani and Sari Kani.

One of the oldest cities in Upper Mesopotamia, the area of Ras al-Ayn has been inhabited since at least the Neolithic age (c. 8,000 BC). Later known as the ancient Aramean city of Sikkan, the Roman city of Rhesaina and Sept. Colonia (under Septimius Severus) and the Byzantine city of Theodosiopolis; the town was destroyed and rebuilt several times, and in medieval times was the site of fierce battles between several Muslim dynasties. With the 1921 Treaty of Ankara, Ras al-Ayn became a divided city when its northern part, today's Ceylanpınar, was ceded to Turkey.

With a population of 29,347 (as of 2004), it is the third largest city in al-Hasakah Governorate, and the administrative center of Ras al-Ayn District.

During the civil war, the city became contested between Syrian opposition forces and YPG from November 2012 until it was finally captured by the YPG in July 2013. It was later captured by the Turkish Armed Forces and the Syrian National Army during the 2019 Turkish offensive into north-eastern Syria.

== Etymology ==
The first mention of the town was as "Rēš ina" during the reign of the Assyrian king Adad-nirari II (911-891 BC). The former word is a proto-Semitic word meaning "head", while the latter is also a proto-Semitic word meaning "eye" or "spring". Thus, the current Arabic and ancient Akkadian names have one meaning: "head of the spring"; or idiomatically: "hill of the spring", indicating a prominent mountain formation close to a well.

Map of the medieval Jazira (Upper Mesopotamia), showing Ras al-Ayn as part of Diyar Rabi'a administrative division

The ancient Greek geographer Ptolemy (d. 168) names the town Raisena. The town, as part of the Roman Empire, was called Ressaina/Resaina. Another name was Theodosiopolis, after emperor Theodosius I, who enlarged the town in 380. The 11th century Arab geographer Muhammad al-Idrisi visited the town, mentioning its name as Ras al-'Ayn, and assigning it to Diyar Rabi'a (abode of the Arab tribe Rabi'a). He also described it as a big city with plenty of water, around 300 springs from which most of al-Khabur river starts. In addition to Ras al-Ayn, medieval Arab Muslim sources refer to the town sometimes as Ain Werda. Nineteenth-century English sources refer to the town as Ras Ain, Ain Verdeh (1819), or Ras el Ain (1868). The Kurdish name Serê Kaniyê also means "head of the spring" or "head of the fountain", referring to water source areas. This name is probably a modern literal translation of the ancient Semitic name.

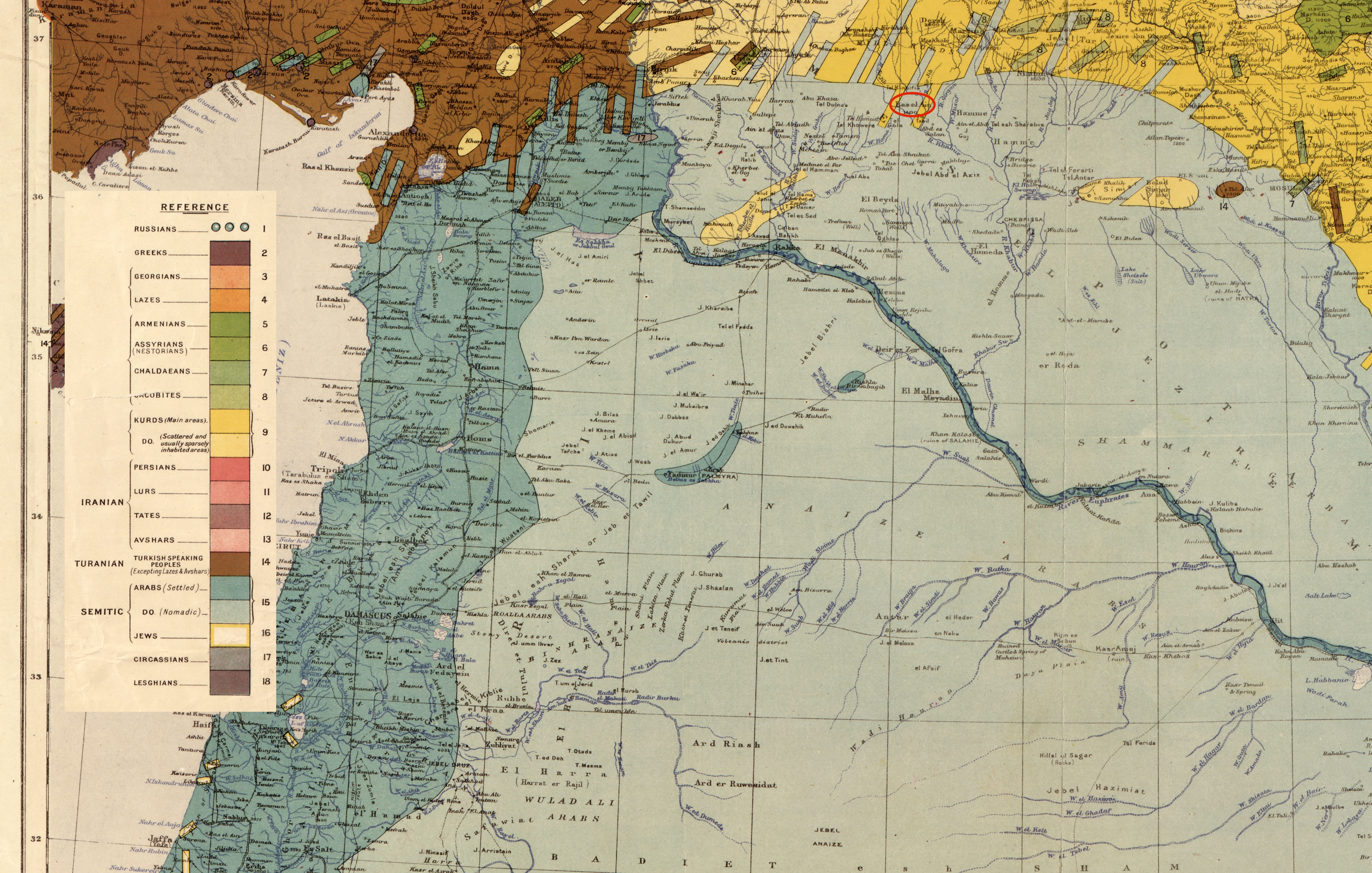
British ethnographical map from 1910 showing the name "Ras el Ain" in the red ellipse (top center). The blue color represents Arab population and yellow represents Kurds

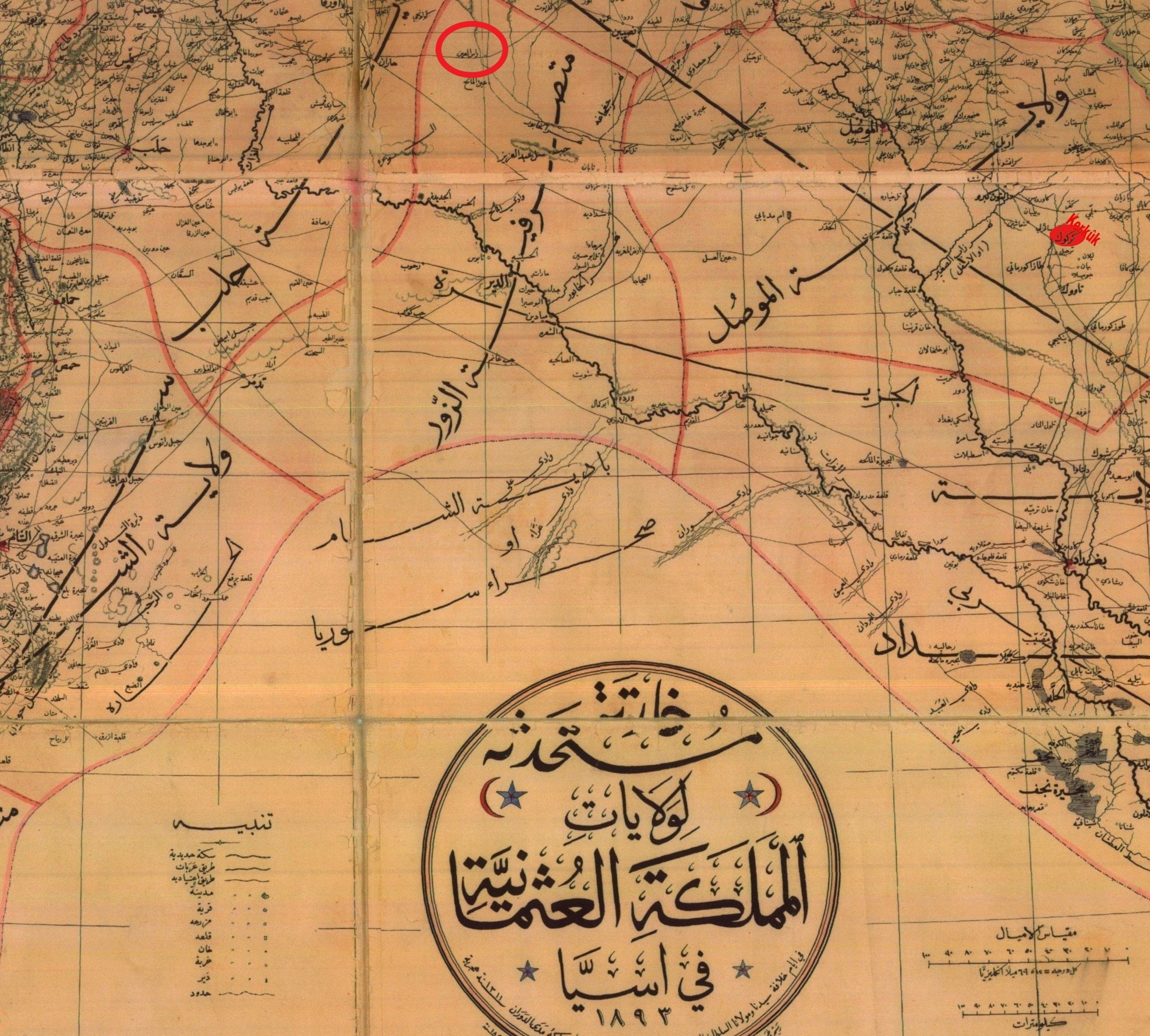
Ottoman map from 1893 showing "Ras al-Ain" (رأس العين) (in red circle, top center)

== Geography ==
Ras al-Ayn is located on a flat plain in the Upper Khabur basin in the northern Syrian region of Jazira. The Khabur, largest tributary of the Euphrates, crosses the border from Turkey near the town of Tell Halaf, about 4 kilometres (2.5 mi) to the southwest of the city. The overground feeders, originating on the headwaters of the Karaca volcano in Şanlıurfa Province, usually do not carry water in the summer, even though Turkey brings in water from the Atatürk reservoir to irrigate the region of Ceylanpınar. While more than 80% of the Upper Khabur's water originates in Turkey, this mostly comes as underground flow. So rather than the overground streams, it is the giant karstic springs of the Ras al-Ayn area that is considered the river's main perennial source.

=== Ras al-Ayn springs ===
Ras al-Ayn has more than 100 natural springs. According to Abul Feda, the number may be as high as 300. The most famous spring is Nab'a al-Kebreet, a hot spring with a very high mineral content, containing calcium, lithium, and radium. One of the springs, Ain el-Kebreet (spring of gunpowder/matches), gives off a sulphorous smell so heinous that Pliny claimed Juno bathed in it.

=== Water supply ===
The Allouk water pumping station, which distributes water to the Hasakah Governorate, is close to Ras al-Ayn. Since the Turkish occupation began, the water supply has been interrupted several times. Previously, the station supplied about 460,000 people in Al-Hasakah, Tell Tamer, and the Al-Hawl refugee camp, but not since the last interruption in March 2020, according to the United Nations High Commissioner for Refugees.

The Zirgan River, rising in the Ghurs Mountains, curves around ancient ruins before joining the Khaboor as its only perennial tributary. The region also contains several jerjubs—seasonal streams fed by rainfall and drainage from the Masius, Deyrik, and Metinan ranges—that flow toward Ras al-Ayn but dry in parts of the year and are not true tributaries. Misidentified by Ainsworth as the Jaghjagha, this error was later repeated by Ritter and Kiepert. Approaching Ras al-Ayn, travellers encounter ancient mounds, bridge ruins, and building foundations, reflecting long habitation. The town lies in a natural basin, with the old ruins on ridges above the springs and the modern settlement in the hollow near the water. About fifteen springs rise here, ten to the northeast forming one branch of the Khaboor, and several to the south and southwest, including Ain el Hassan and Ain el Beydha, forming the larger branch; their union creates the river’s true source. Two of these springs are thermal, one sulphuric and long exploited.

== History ==
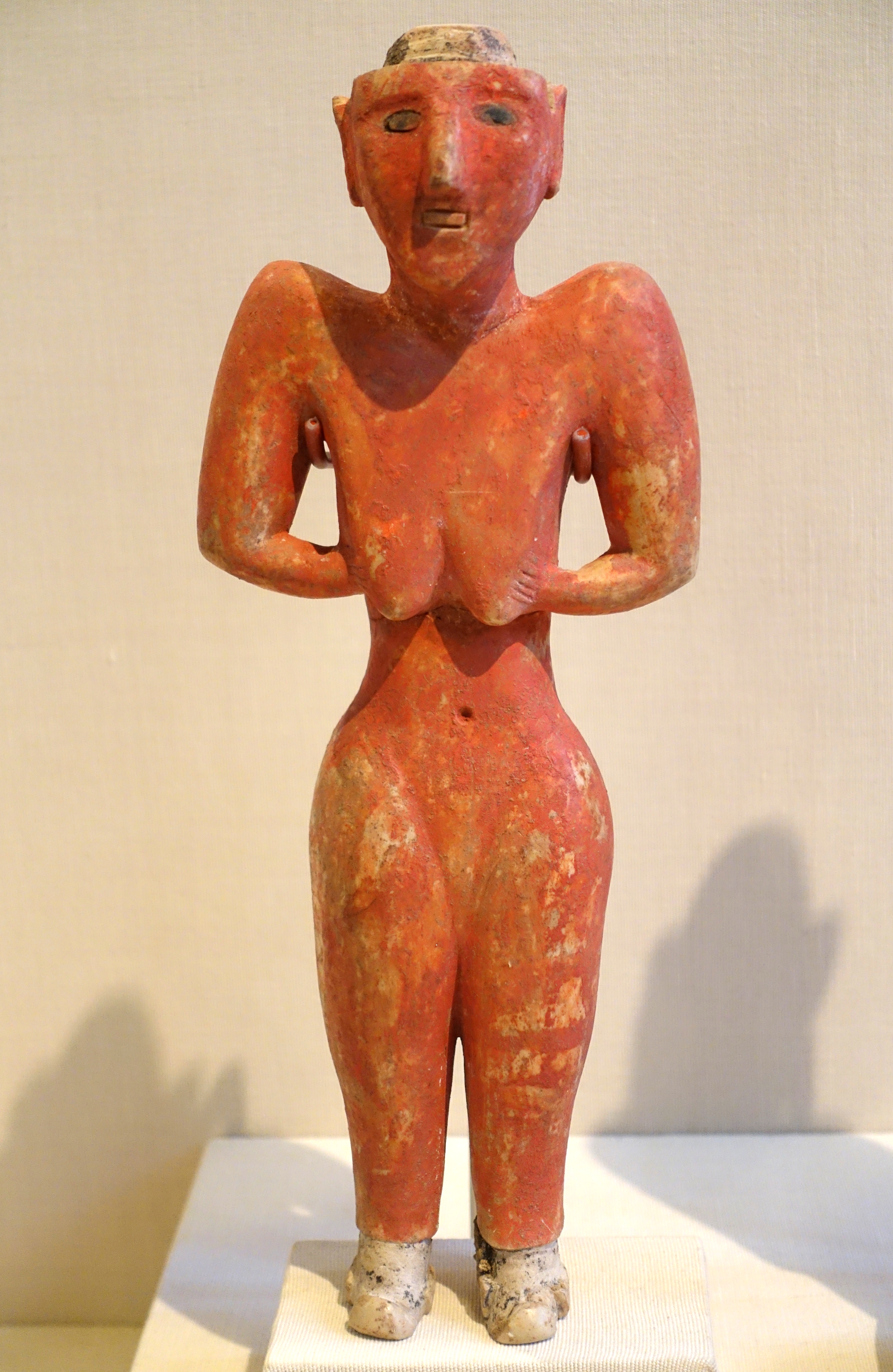
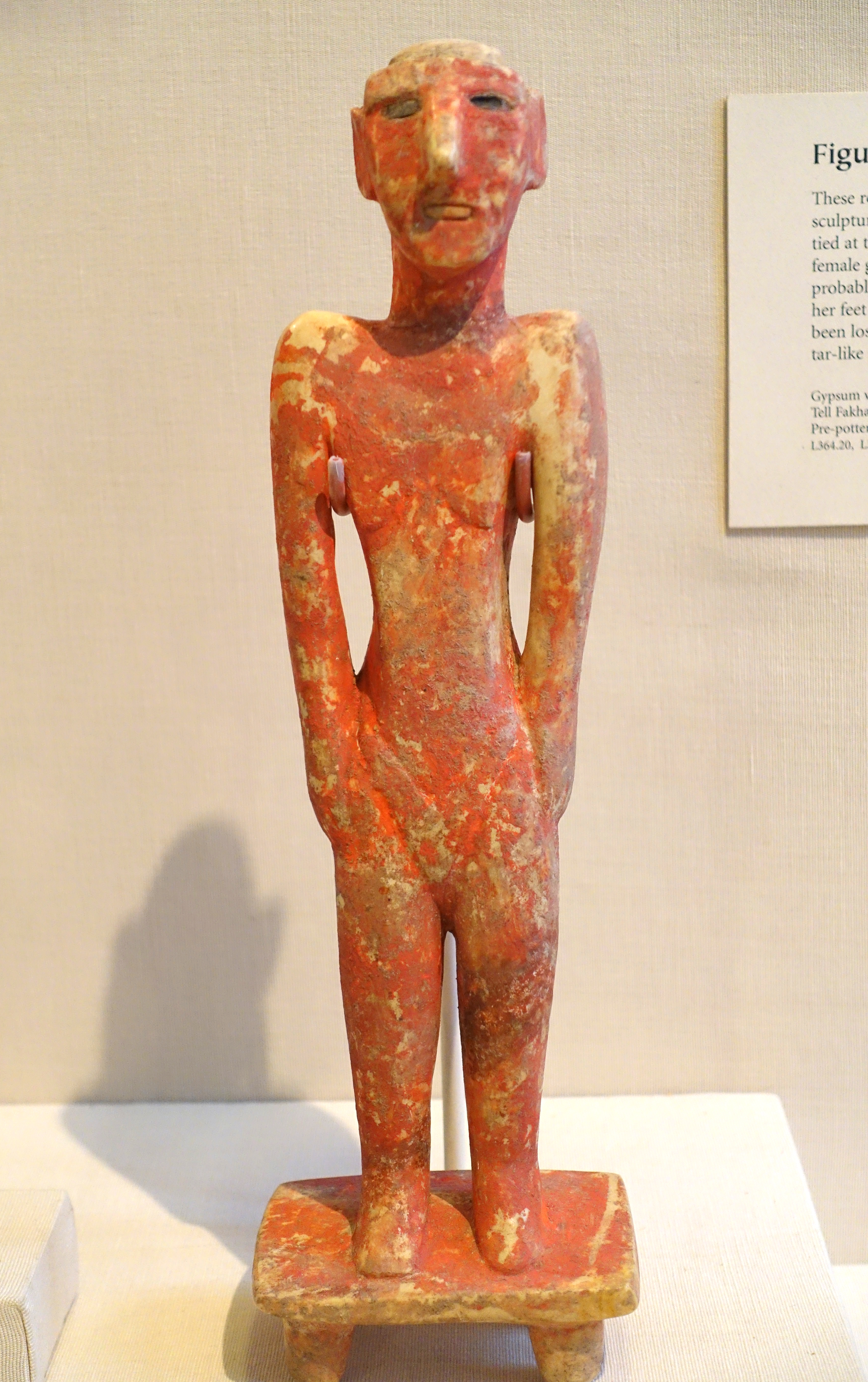
Two Neolithic figurines (9000–7000 BC), gypsum with bitumen and stone inlays, excavated in Tell Fekheriye.
Oriental Institute Museum, Chicago, USA.

=== Neolithic and ancient history ===
The area of Ras al-Ayn was inhabited at least since the Neolithic age (c. 8.000 BC). Today's Ras al-Ayn can be traced back to a settlement existing since c. 2000 BC, which in the early 1st millennium BC became the ancient city of Sikkan, part of the Aramaean kingdom of Bit Bahiani. It was later conquered by the Medes. The archaeological site is located on the southern edge of the mound Tell Fekheriye, around which today's Ras al-Ayn is built, just a few hundred meters south of the city center. During excavations in 1979, the famous Tell Fekheriye bilingual inscription was found. The nearby town of Tell Halaf is also a former site of an Aramean city.

=== Classical era ===
In later times, the town became known as "Rhesaina", "Ayn Warda", and "Theodosiopolis", the latter named after the Byzantine emperor Theodosius I who granted the settlement city rights. The latter name was also shared with the Armenian city of Karin (modern Erzurum) making it difficult to distinguish between them.

The Sasanians destroyed the city twice in 578 and 580 before rebuilding it and constructing one of the three Sassanian academies in it (the other two being Gundishapur and Ctesiphon) in it.

=== Medieval history ===
In 640, the Arabs conquered the city, which was the only city in Upper Mesopotamia to fall by the sword, as due to its central position and great strategic importance the Greeks defended it to the last. At the time of the Arab Conquest, El Wakidi in his "Futuh Diyar Rabiah and Diyar Bakr" states there was a suspension bridge "resting on iron columns with chains between them where boards were laid" over the Khaboor near Ras al-Ayn. He states it was destroyed by Armenian Governor of Tel Mozen (Tela), on his way to help out the Christian governor of Circesium following the orders of Schariam, son of Forninuin or Firuf, Governor of all Upper and Lower Diyarbekr. This is the only known such bridge in the Old World until the Industrial Age.

The Byzantines raided the city in 942 and took many prisoners. In 1129, Crusader Joscelin I managed to hold the city briefly, killing many of its Arab inhabitants.

At its height the city had a West Syrian bishopric and many monasteries. The city also contained two mosques and an East Syrian church and numerous schools, baths, and gardens. According to Elazeezee Easel Ain was called Ain Werda, and that it was the principal town of Diyar Rabiah.

Ras al-Ayn became contested between the Zengids, Ayyubids, and the Khwarazmians in the 12th and 13th centuries. It was sacked by Tamerlane at the end of the 14th century, ending its role as a major city in al-Jazira.

=== Ottoman history ===
In the 19th century a colony of Muslim Chechen refugees fleeing the Russian conquest of the Caucasus were settled in the town by the Ottoman Empire. The Ottomans also built barracks and a fort for a thousand soldiers to control and protect the refugees.

During the Armenian genocide, Ras al-Ayn was one of the major collecting points for deported Armenians. From 1915 on, 1.5 million Armenians were deported from all over Anatolia, many forced on death marches into the Syrian desert. Approximately 80,000 Armenians, mostly women and children, were slaughtered in desert death camps near Ras al-Ayn. As well as the Deir ez-Zor camps further south, the Ras al-Ayn camps became "synonymous with Armenian suffering."

=== Modern history ===
After the fall of the Ottoman Empire and the 1921 Treaty of Ankara, Ras al-Ayn became a divided city when its northern neighborhoods, today's Ceylanpınar, were ceded to Turkey. Today, the two cities are separated by a fenced border strip and the Berlin–Baghdad Railway on the Turkish side. The only border crossing is located in the western outskirts of Ras al-Ayn. The town was first part of the French colonial empire's Mandate for Syria and the Lebanon and, from 1946, the independent state of Syria.

==== Civil War ====
During the civil war, Ras al-Ayn was engulfed by the long Battle of Ras al-Ayn. In late November 2012, rebels of al-Nusra Front and the FSA attacked Syrian Army positions, expelling them from the town. During the following eight months, the Kurdish-majority People's Protection Units (YPG), present from the outset, gradually entrenched its position, and eventually formed an alliance with a non-jihadist FSA faction. On 21 July 2013, this alliance expelled the jihadists after a night of heavy fighting.

The town was part of Rojava for the following six years, until it was attacked and captured by the Turkish Armed Forces and allied Syrian National Army during the October 2019 Turkish offensive into north-eastern Syria, in the Second Battle of Ras al-Ayn. After 11 days of clashes and siege, the Syrian Democratic Forces and the Kurdish YPG retreated from Ras al-Ayn as part of a ceasefire agreement, causing the city to fall under Syrian opposition control.

==== Bombings ====
On December 10, 2020, a car bomb exploded at a checkpoint run by Turkish-supported Syrian National Army rebels in Ras al-Ayn. Reports on casualties differed, but according to several sources the explosion killed over 10 people including 2 Turkish soldiers. Turkish authorities blamed the Peoples Protection Units (YPG) for the car bombing as Turkey claims they are affiliated with the Kurdistan Workers Party (PKK). According the ABC, no group has claimed responsibility for the bombing.

Bombing continued in January and February 2021.

== Demographics ==
Historical population
Year	Pop.	±%
1981	14,278	—
2004	29,347	+105.5%

In 2004 the population was 29,347. The town has been described as having an Arab majority, in addition to Kurdish, Assyrian, Armenian, Turkmen and Chechen minorities before the Turkish/SNA takeover in October 2019. War crimes committed since the Turkish occupation began have since caused an exodus of Kurds, Christians, and other minorities from the town such as Assyrians and Armenians. The Turkish government's resettling of mainly Arab and Turkmen Syrian refugees from other parts of Syria in Ras al-Ayn has further altered the town's demographics.

=== Churches in the town ===
- Syriac Orthodox Church of Saint Thomas the Apostle (كنيسة مار توما الرسول للسريان الأرثوذكس)
- Syriac Catholic Church of Mary Magdalene (كنيسة مريم المجدلية للسريان الكاثوليك)
- Armenian Orthodox Church of Saint Hagop (كنيسة القديس هاكوب للارمن الارثوذكس)

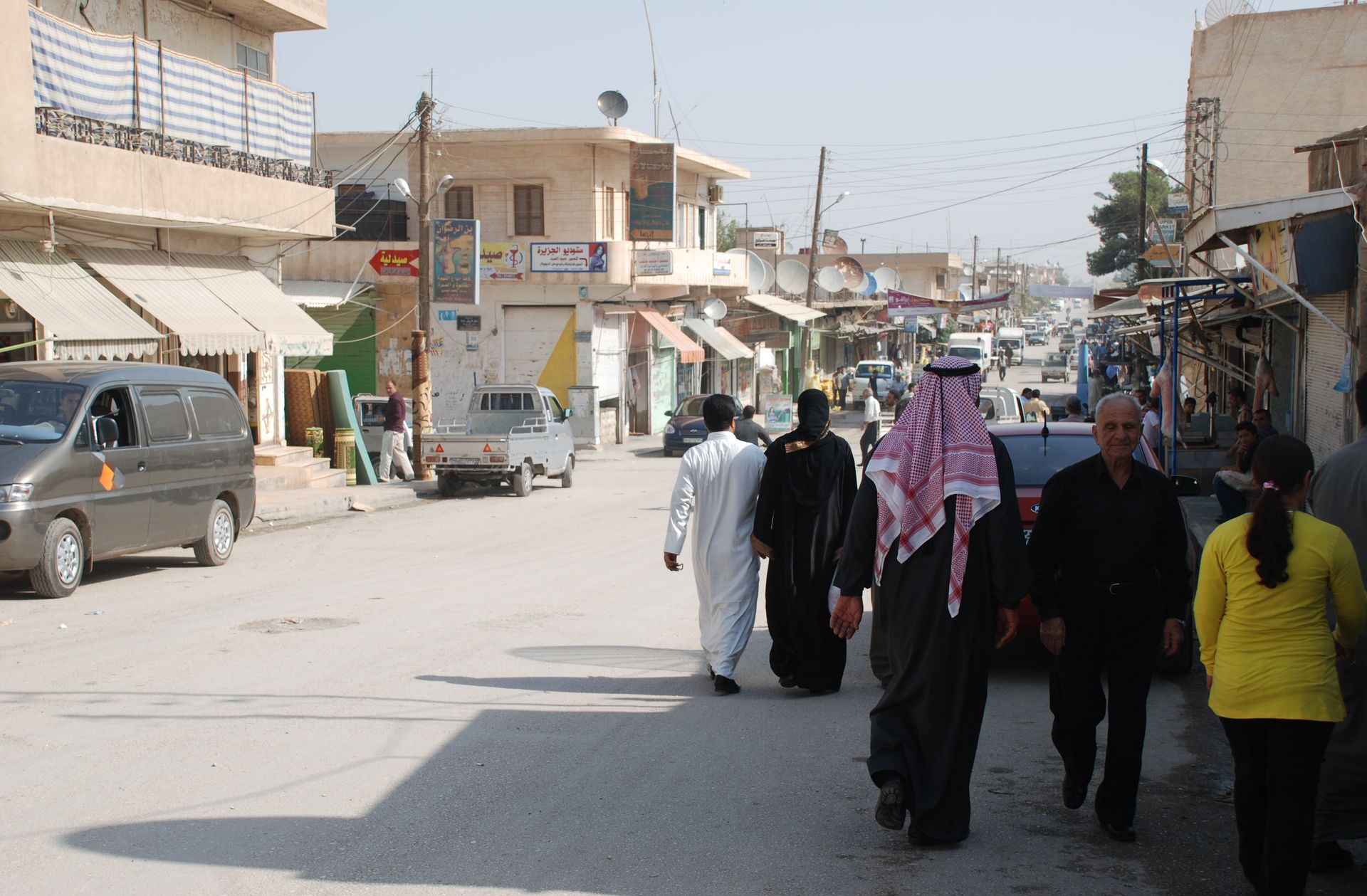
People in the city center

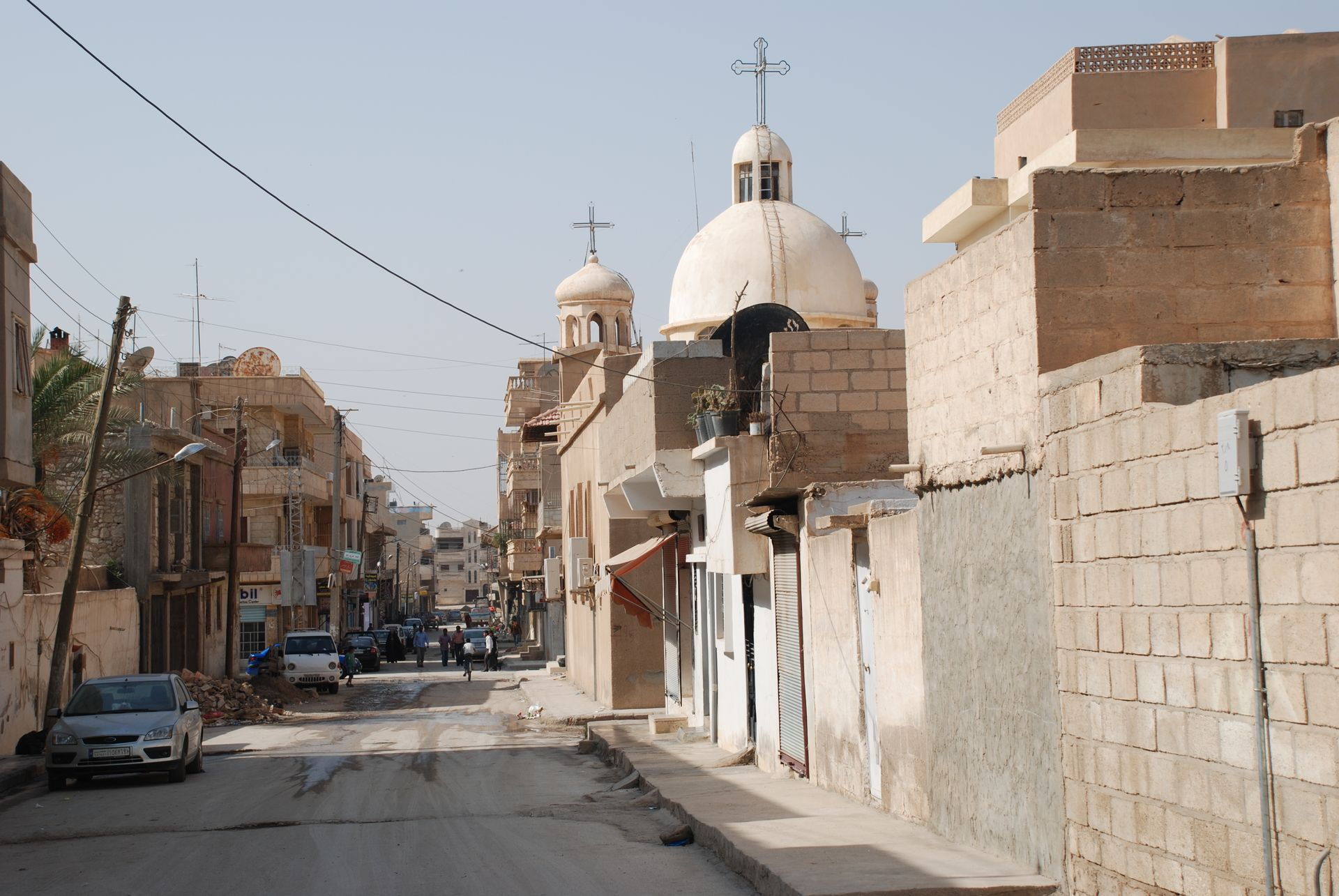
Orthodox church

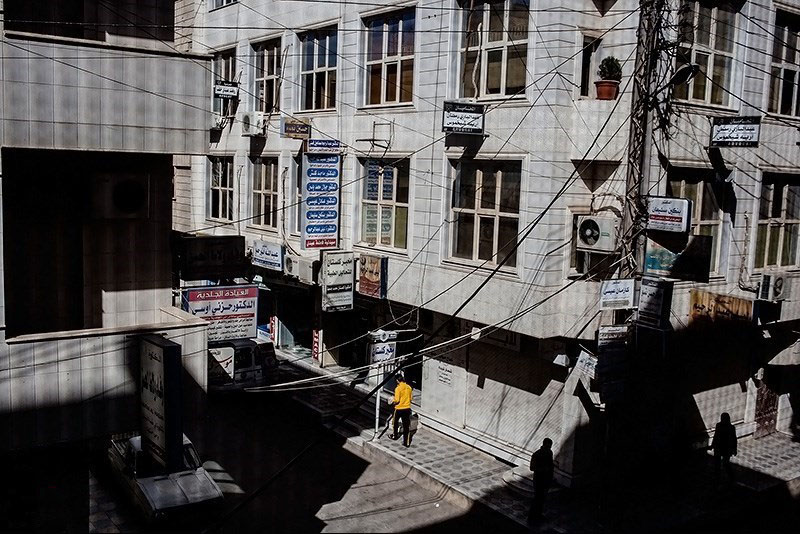
A view in October 2013. The city fell under Kurdish YPG control during the Syrian Civil War
