= Kurdish immigration into Syria =

Diaspora of Kurdish individuals in Syria

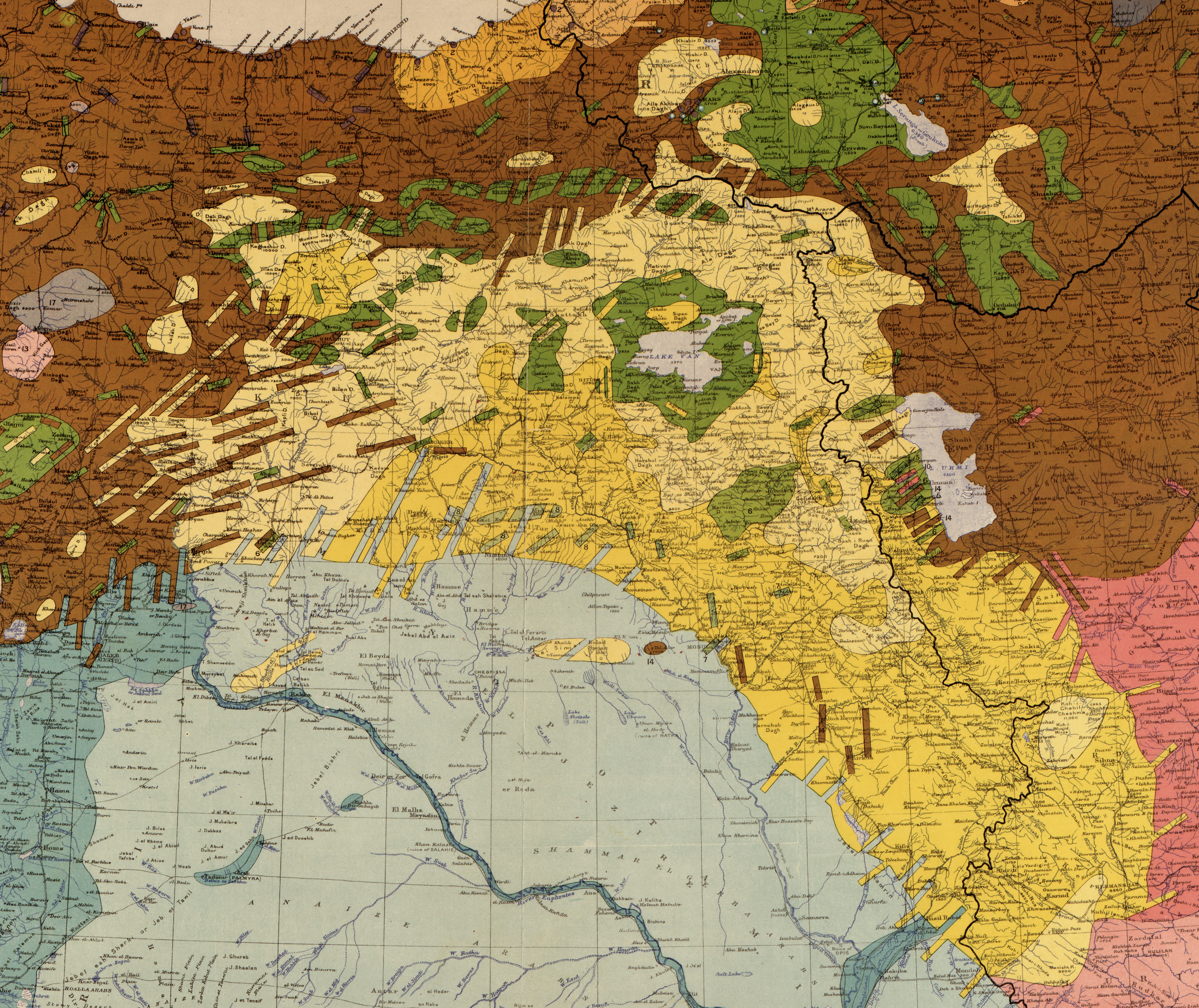
Pre-World War I demographic map

Kurdish immigration into Syria refers to the successive and large-scale influx of Kurds into Syria since the disintegration of the Ottoman Empire. While Kurdish presence in Syria predates the 20th century - most notably in Damascus, Kurd Dagh, and Afrin - the vast majority of Kurds in Syria today descend form migrants who fled Turkish persecution. Arriving in Syria during the French Mandate, most of these Kurds settled in the Jazirah where they continue living today, with smaller communities scattered in various places across the country. As of 2025, Kurds form about 10% of Syria's population, numbering around 2 million.

== Pre-modern Kurdish presence in Syria ==
Kurds have been known to have small, sporadic presence in different cities of Syria for centuries. Since the 7th century, Kurds were often influential in the area of religion. They were also known as warriors, and the Zengid dynasty had a strong contingent of Kurds in their military. The Mirdasid prince of Aleppo stationed Kurds in the fortress of castle Krak de Chevalier to protect the trade routes between Homs and Hama from 1029 to 1038. In Arabic, the castle was known as Ḥoṣn al-Akrād (حصن الأكراد) meaning "fort of the Kurds."

Saladin, the Kurdish founder of the Ayyubid dynasty, established himself in Damascus, where he had lived during his youth. His brother Turan-Shah governed Syria.

== 20th century ==
=== French mandate era (1920–1946) ===
During the interwar period, the Turkish campaign to assimilate its Kurdish population was at its peak. This caused large groups of Kurds to leave Turkey. These first waves of Kurds arrived with the laying of the Aleppo-Baghdad section of the Berlin-Baghdad railway. According to Kurdish studies expert Jordi Tejel, Kurdish political parties at the time were not interested in challenging Syrian borders and preferred to focus on their region of origin in Turkish Kurdistan.

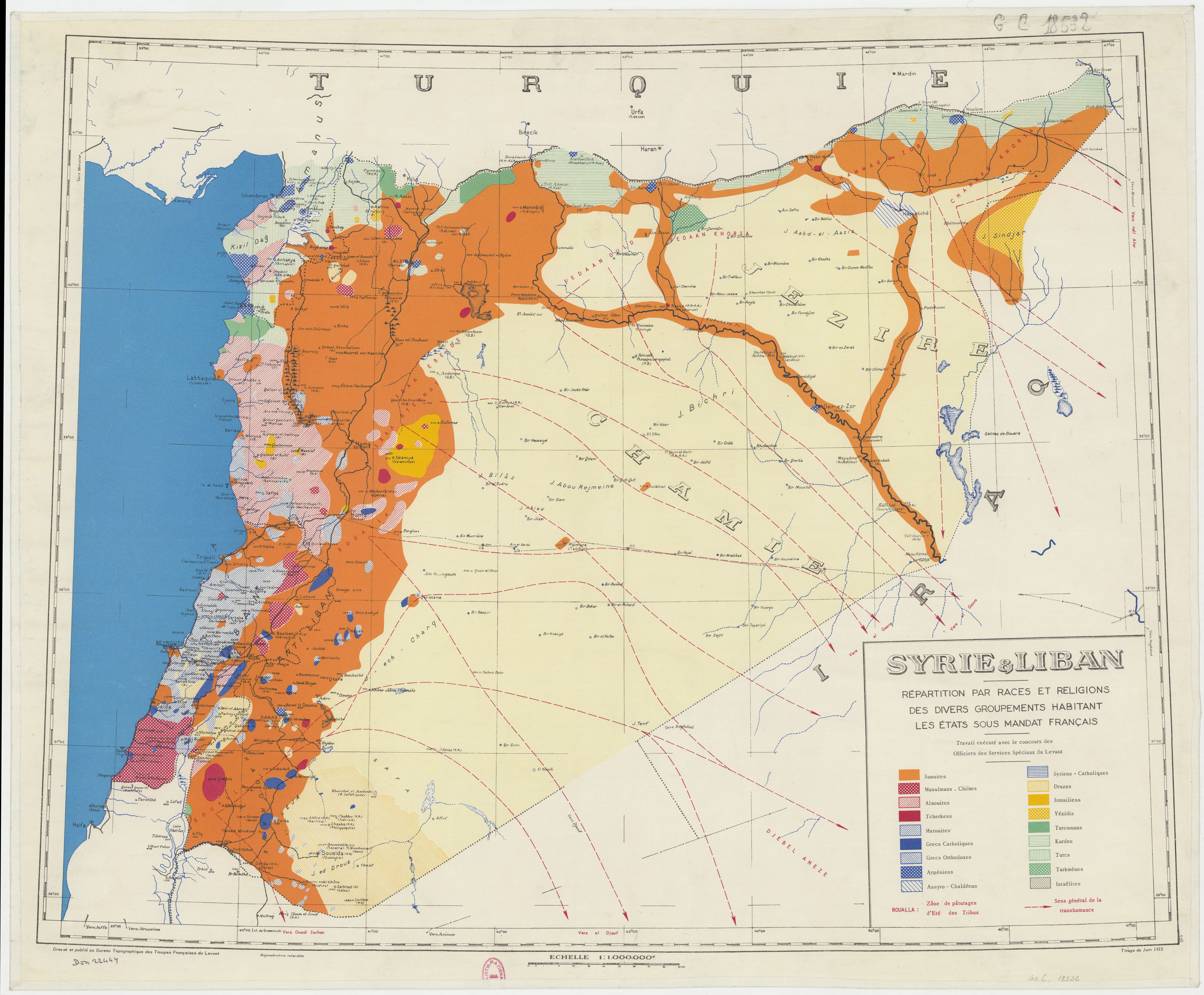
Demographic map of the region in 1935

Maurice Abadie, a French general and overseer of the French occupation of Syria, noticed that Kurds were beginning to migrate west of the Euphrates, particularly to northern Syria. The Kurds who settled there lived alongside Turks, Christian Arabs and Assyrians, and Muslim Arabs, and adopted several customs from their new neighbours.

In the 1920s, the military situation in southeastern Turkey deteriorated. Between February and March 1925, the Kurdish cleric Sheikh Said led a rebellion in the northern parts of Diyarbakır Province and conquered large swaths of southeastern Turkey, besieging the city of Diyarbakır. The rebellion forced tens of thousands of Kurds to flee their homes in the mountains of Turkey and cross into Syria. This rebellion was one of the first in a long series of rebellions and conflicts between the Kurdish population and Kemalist authorities.

The French Mandate authorities encouraged this Kurdish immigration and granted them considerable rights, including Syrian citizenship, aiming to develop minority autonomies as part of a divide and rule strategy. This favorable policy towards Kurdish immigration into Syria was part of the a plan executed by French officer Pierre Terrier (and became known as the Terrier Plan) aiming at creating majority/minority rifts in Syria. The Terrier Plan shaped what is known as the Kurdish policy by mandatory authorities. This plan also used the new immigrants in its "sedentarization" (or pacification) project aiming at claiming large swathes of land to make the mandate financially more profitable for the French.

In his zeal to increase the population of the area, Terrier has even sometimes contradicted the directives of the French High Commissariat in Beirut. Some of the new arrivals worked with the French against the local population. A prime example is the Kurdish tribal chief Hadjo Agha of the influential Havergan tribe who immigrated from Turkey together with more than 600 families, including arms and sheep, and settled in al-Qahtaniyah. In different parts of Syria, the French recruited heavily from the Kurds and other minority groups such as Alawite and Druze, for its local armed forces.

The French authorities themselves generally organized the settlement of the refugees. One of the most important of these plans was carried out in Upper Jazira in northeastern Syria where the French built new towns and villages such as Qamishli (in 1926) and al-Malikiyah (then called Dijlah or Tigre in French) with the intention of housing the Turkish and Iraqi refugees considered to be "friendly" (i.e. Christians and Kurds). This has further encouraged the non-Turkish minorities that were under Turkish pressure to leave their ancestral homes and property, they could find refuge and rebuild their lives in relative safety in neighboring Syria. Consequently, the border areas in al-Hasakah Governorate between Qamishli and al-Malikiyah started to have a Kurdish majority, while Arabs remained the majority in river plains and elsewhere.

The French geographer Robert Montagne summarized the situation in 1932 as follows:

We are seeing an increase in village establishment that are either constructed by the Kurds descending from the Anatolian mountains (north of the border) to cultivate or as a sign of increasing settlement of Arab groups with the help of their Armenian and Yezidi farmers.

=== After World War II ===
Illegal immigration along the border from Ras al-Ayn to al-Malikiyya continued after WWII. Another major wave of illegal Kurdish immigrants settled down in the region along the border in major population centers such as Al-Darbasiyah, Amuda and al-Malikiyya. Many of these Kurds were able to register themselves illegally in the Syrian civil registers. They were also able to obtain Syrian identity cards through a variety of means, with the help of their relatives and members of their tribes. It is thought that the land reform encouraged their immigration in an effort to benefit from socialist-style land redistribution. Official figures available in 1961 showed that in a mere seven-year period, between 1954 and 1961, the population of al-Hasakah governorate had increased from 240,000 to 305,000, an increase of 27% which could not possibly be explained merely by natural increase. The government was sufficiently worried by the apparent influx that it carried out a sample census in June 1962 which indicated the real population was probably closer to 340,000. The huge unemployment due to mechanization, harsh working conditions and political instability in Turkey are all factors that have further encouraged immigration out of Turkey.

== Establishment of new Kurdish towns and villages ==
The French official reports show the existence of at most 45 Kurdish villages in Jazira prior to 1927. A new wave of refugees arrived in 1929. The mandatory authorities continued to encourage Kurdish immigration into Syria, and by 1939, the villages numbered between 700 and 800. These continuous waves swelled the number of Kurds in the area, and French geographers Fevret and Gibert estimated that in 1953 out of the total 146,000 inhabitants of Jazira, agriculturalist Kurds made up 60,000 (41%), semi-sedentary and nomad Arabs 50,000 (34%), and a quarter of the population were Christians.

An account of the number of settlements for the new immigrants and their locations in Syrian Jazira is given by the French geographer Etienne de Vaumas. These settlements were created to help the newcomers work in mechanized agricultural projects. As of 1932, in the Kamishliye (Qamishli) region, one town, 28 villages, 48 hamlets and 29 isolated farms for future villages were established. To the north of Ain Diwar (in al-Malikiyah district, almost 90 villages were erected. The number of villages was estimated by the French intelligence officer in Hasakah (regional capital) at 250 in 1929. This number jumped to 336 in 1935.

A group of Kurdish Alevis who fled the persecution of the Turkish army during the Dersim massacre, settled in Mabeta in the 1930s.

== Kurdish tribes immigrating to Syria ==
French geographer Pierre Rondot provides a detailed account of the settlement areas for the native and incoming tribes of Jazira, extending his focus to the Taurus Mountains in Turkey. In the Syrian Jazira region he mentions the following Kurdish tribes in the Qamishli area and comments on their origins in Turkey and current establishment locations:

- Tchities (Teşikan tribe): descended from the northern mountains in Adiyaman Province under the leadership of Xelaf Axa and established to the east of Qamishli
- Pinar Ali: agricultural workers living in villages west of Qamishli where they do not own land
- Dakouri (Dakoran tribe): settled farmers, descended from the Mardin area
- Kiki (Kikan): settled farmers, descended from the Mardin area
- Milli: settled farmers, came from the area between Urfa and Mardin

Rondot reports that the establishment of all of these tribes is recent but events have evolved rapidly with the development of agricultural projects in the area.In the Derik-Ain Diwar area, Rondot mentions the Hesenan, Harunan and Alikan tribes, all of which had descended from the mountains to the north three or four generations ago.

== Political influence of Turkish Kurds in Syria and Turkey ==
The Kurdish immigration from Turkey has provided most of the Kurdish leaders in Syria, notably the Bedir Khan (also spelled Bedirxan) family (known for being the emirs of Botan), and Hassan Hajo Agha.

Soon after their arrival, some Turkish Kurds in Syria established Xoybûn conference in Beirut in 1927, with its objectives to formulate a national language to help fight against the Kemalists, to organize themselves against the Turks, and to liberate Kurdistan from the Turkish yoke. The French administration allowed Kurdish press and associations to operate more freely than in Turkey. For example, Celadet Alî Bedirxan, an immigrant from Cizre in southeastern Turkey, began publishing the Kurdish magazine Hawar in 1932, which was focused on Turkish politics.

== Demographics ==
From early on in the 1920's, the Kurdish immigration played a major role in changing the demographics of northeastern Syria. The French diplomatic archives cite numbers of the immigrants arriving to Syria from Turkey. A French letter dated 27 January 1925 claimed that French authorities received 96,450 immigrants from Turkey (Kurdish and Armenian), indicating that two-thirds of them were resettled in inner parts of Syria to appease Turkish complaints.

=== Syrian census of 1939 ===
In 1939, French mandate authorities reported the following population numbers for the different ethnic and religious groups in al-Hasakah city centre:

Syrian census of 1939
District	Arab	Kurd	Christian	Armenian	Yezidi	Assyrian
Hasakah city centre	7,133	360	5,700	500		
Tell Tamer						8,767
Ras al-Ayn	2,283	1,025	2,263			
Shaddadi	2,610		6			
Tell Brak	4,509	905		200		
Qamishli city centre	7,990	5,892	14,140	3,500	720	
Amuda		11,260	1,500		720	
Al-Darbasiyah	3,011	7,899	2,382		425	
Chagar Bazar	380	3,810	3			
Ain Diwar		3,608	900			
Derik (later renamed Al-Malikiyah)	44	1,685	1,204			
Mustafiyya	344	959	50			
Derouna Agha	570	5,097	27			
Tel Koger (later renamed Al-Yaarubiyah)	165					

=== Jazira population between 1929 and 1954 ===
The number of Kurds settled in the Jazira province during the 1920s was estimated at 20,000 to 25,000 people. These numbers marked a huge demographic shift in Jazira's population that was estimated at 40,000 in 1929.

Due to successive waves of Kurdish immigration from Turkey, the population of Jazira province grew significantly. The largest jumps were in 1932 and 1935 when the population increased by 42.7% and 45.8%, respectively.

Historical population increases in Jazira are depicted in the table below:

Population from 1929-1954
Year	Population	% change
1929	40,000	-
1931	44,153	+10.4%
1932	63,000	+42.7%
1933	64,886	+3.0%
1935	94,596	+45.8%
1937	98,144	-
1938	103,514	+5.5%
1939	106,052	+2.5%
1940	126,508	+19.3%
1941	128,145	+2.1%
1942	136,107	-
1943	146,001	+7.3%
1946	151,137	+3.5%
1950	159,300	+5.4%
1951	162,145	+1.8%
1952	177,388	+9.4%
1953	232,104	+30.8%
1954	233,998	+0.8%
