= Al-Yusefiyeh =

Al-Yusufiyah اليوسفية
- Village
- Interactive map of Al-Yusufiyah
- Country: Syria
- Governorate: Al-Hasakah
- District: Al-Malikiyah District
- Subdistrict: Al-Maabada Subdistrict
- Time zone: UTC+2 (EET)

Al-Yusufiyah (Arabic: اليوسفية) is a village in northeastern Syria. It is administratively part of Al-Maabada Subdistrict in Al-Malikiyah District of Al-Hasakah Governorate.

The village lies about 30 km southwest of Al-Malikiyah, approximately 23 km south of the Turkish border, and around 16 km from the Iraqi border at the Al-Yarubiyah Border Crossing. It is located south of the oil fields of Rmelan. Two oil wells are located within its lands, and Rmelan River passes through the area.
