= 2015 Rojava local elections =

Elections

2015 Northern Syria Local Elections

All 12 municipal councils seats of Dêrik, Girkê Legê, Tirbespiyê, East and West Qamişlo, Amûdê, Dirbêsiyê, Serêkaniyê, Hesekê, Til Koçer, Çilaxa, and Ebu Raseyn.
- Councils holding elections.

In the de facto autonomous Rojava region of northern Syria, the first local elections took place on March 13, 2015. The municipal governments in the three predominantly Kurdish cantons Cizîrê, Kobanî and Afrin were to be elected.

== Background ==
Syrian Kurds declared their own region, Rojava, in November 2013. Following the Cizîre and Kobanî cantons, the Afrin Canton was then established in January 2014.

In 2013, the YPG’s umbrella organization, the PYD, declared unilateral autonomy in Rojava.

The YPG, backed by the US at the time, made significant gains in the weeks leading to the elections against the terrorist group ISIS, cutting an important supply route from territory controlled by that group in Iraq. During this, the YPG emerged as a key partner for the ISIS war in Syria. Backed by Peshmerga fighters and the United States, the YPG defeated ISIS in the Siege of Kobanî in January 2015.

== Election ==
According to the Rojava High Election Commission, 565 candidates stood for the twelve municipal councils. The polls were opened at 8:00 A.M. and voters were able to cast their votes until 8:00 P.M. in the evening.

160 polling stations were opened across the Cizîrê Canton in the following twelve cities and towns:

- Dêrik
- Girkê Legê
- Tirbespiyê
- East and West Qamişlo
- Amûdê
- Dirbêsiyê
- Serêkaniyê
- Hesekê
- Til Koçer
- Çilaxa
- Ebu Raseyn

Of the 565 candidates, 237 were cited to be women, and apart from the majority being Kurdish, 39 Assyrians, 28 Arabs and one Chechen stood for the election. In Tell Tamer (Girê Xurma), the election had to be postponed as Islamic State of Iraq and the Levant (ISIL) troops attacked the town with mortars.

== Reactions ==
The Kurdish National Council (KNC) boycotted the elections, and a spokesperson for the Iraqi Kurdistan Regional Government criticized the elections as being in contradiction to the Duhok Agreement. On the other hand, Syrian Information Minister Omran Zoghbi announced that his government considered recognizing the Kurdish autonomy "within the law and constitution."

== See also ==
- 2017 Northern Syria local elections
