= Tal al-Arab Gharbi =

Tal al-Arab Gharbi تل العرب غربي
- Village
- Location within Syria
- Coordinates: 36°55′56″N 41°53′59″E
- Country: Syria
- Governorate: Al-Hasakah
- District: al-Malikiyah
- Subdistrict: al-Yaarubiyah
- Elevation: 415 m (1,362 ft)

Population (2004)
  - Total: 936

Tal al-Arab Gharbi is a Syrian village located in the al-Yaarubiyah Subdistrict of the al-Malikiyah District in al-Hasakah Governorate, northeastern Syria. It is situated approximately 26 kilometres (16 mi) northwest of the town of al-Yaarubiyah at an elevation of 415 metres (1,362 ft) above sea level. A northbound oil pipeline passes to the north of the village, extending toward the Homs and Baniyas refineries.

The village has an agricultural economy, primarily based on dryland farming of wheat and barley, and irrigated cultivation of cotton and vegetables. Livestock farming is also present, including sheep, goats, and poultry. In addition, the village has oil stations.

Before the Syrian civil war, the village had a population of 936 according to the 2004 census conducted by the Syrian Central Bureau of Statistics.
