= Syrian Kurdistan =

Kurdish inhabited area of Syria

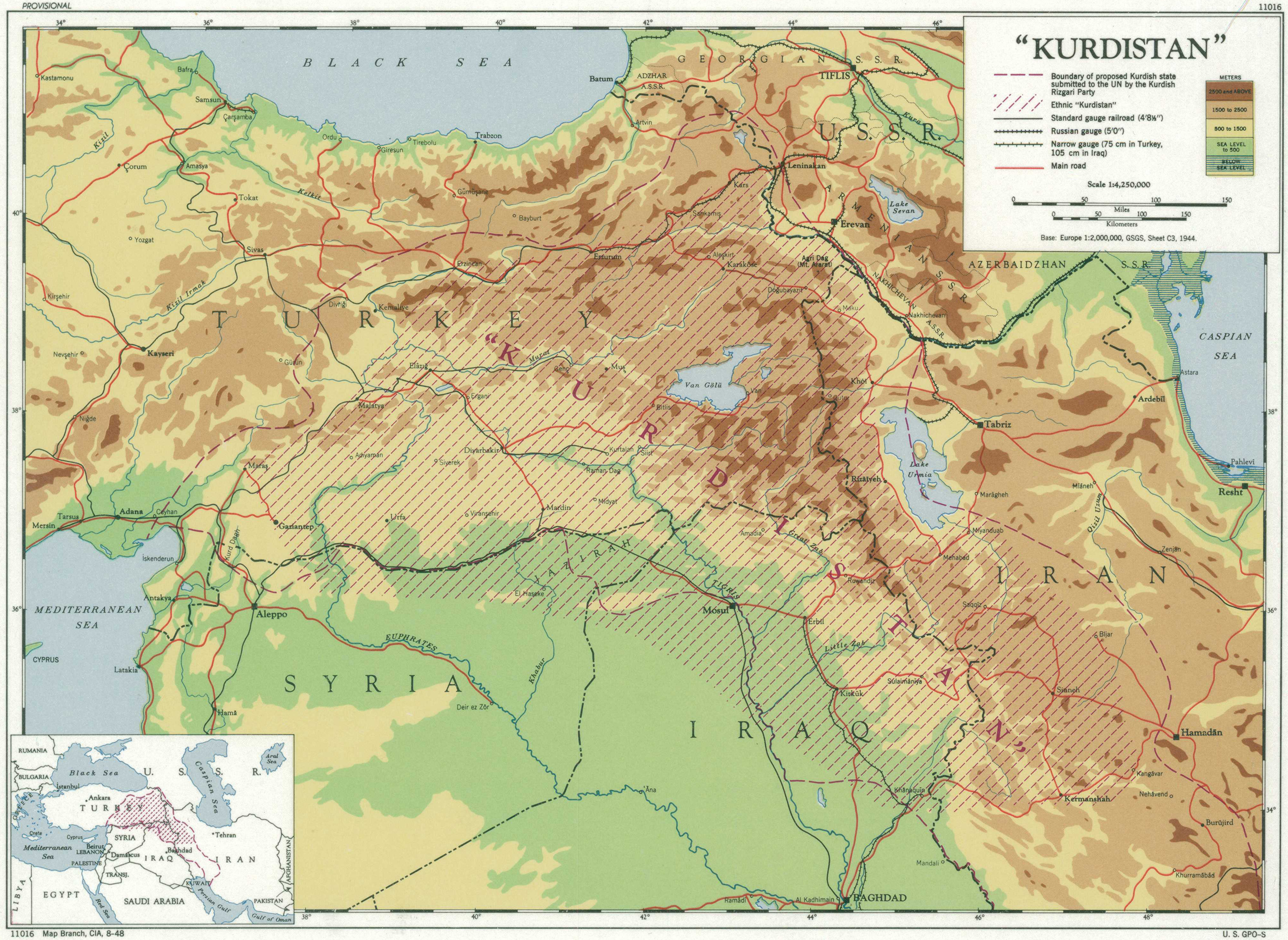
1946 CIA map of Kurdistan showing northern Syria within "ethnic Kurdistan" with diagonal red lines, while showing part of Al-Hasakah Governorate and part of Aleppo Governorate within the "boundary of the proposed Kurdish state submitted to the United Nations by the Kurdish Razkari Party"

Syrian Kurdistan, also called Western Kurdistan or Rojava (from Kurdish: Rojavayê Kurdistanê, lit. 'Kurdistan where the sun sets'), is a region in northern Syria where Kurds form the majority. It geographically surrounds three noncontiguous enclaves along the Turkish and Iraqi borders: Afrin in the northwest, Kobani in the north, and Jazira in the northeast. The term started to become more widely known as Kurdish nationalist groups and parties started to use it in 2013 to describe the political entity later known as "Democratic Autonomous Administration of North and East Syria". However, this usage was officially dropped in 2016 in favor of a more inclusive name to the heterogenous area under PYD control.

Kurdish nationalists consider Syrian Kurdistan as one of the four Lesser Kurdistans that comprise Greater Kurdistan, alongside Iranian Kurdistan, Turkish Kurdistan, and Iraqi Kurdistan. A significant part of the Kurdish community of Afrin was displaced during the Turkish-backed Operation Olive Branch in 2018.

== Etymology ==
According to the International Crisis Group and Kurdish studies expert Robert Lowe, the term "Rojava" gained common usage among Syrian Kurdish parties in 2013 to refer to the PYD-controlled areas of Syria. As for the term "Western Kurdistan", the Kurdish author Mehrdad R. Izady in 1992 mentioned the term in the context of "western Kurdistan in Turkey and Syria".

== History ==
=== Origins, Middle Ages, and Ottoman Syria (1516–1920) ===
Kurds, widely considered to be the largest stateless ethnic group, are an Iranic ethnic group inhabiting a mountainous region known as Kurdistan that spans parts of several sovereign states in West Asia, primarily southeastern Turkey, parts of northern Syria, northern Iraq, and western Iran. Although Kurdish origins and migration remain the subject of scholarly investigation and controversy, and several different groups throughout history have lived in Kurdistan, Kurds are traditionally considered to have descended from Indo-European tribes migrating westward toward Iran in the middle of the second millennium BCE. In antiquity, Kurdistan was ruled, in turn, by the Assyrian, Median, Greek, Roman, and Persian empires. After the advent of Islam in the 7th century CE, Kurdish tribes in Upper Mesopotamia and western Iran resisted advancing Muslim armies, but ultimately most Kurds converted to the Shafi'ite school of Sunni Islam. Kurdish cultural and political power re-emerged over the next three centuries, as Kurds in Kurdistan lived semi-autonomously within the Islamic caliphates.

The decline of the Abbasid Caliphate in the 10th century led to the rise of Kurdish dynasties, including the Ayyubids (1171–1260). Since the 11th century, the medieval Crusader castle Krak des Chevaliers in the Syrian Coastal Mountain Range has been known as the "Fortress of the Kurds" or "Castle of the Kurds". The founder of the Ayyubids, Saladin, famous for unifying Muslims and recapturing Jerusalem from Crusaders in 1187, expanded his empire into Syria and beyond. According to Ibn Hawqal the region of Jazira was the Summer pasture of Hadhabani Kurds.

A group of Kurdish soldiers remained in Damascus after Saladin was buried there in 1193, establishing an enclave in the city known as the "Kurdish quarter", which was a center of Kurdish culture and language into the 20th century. The Ayyubids lost Syria to the Mongols in the mid-13th century, who were quickly driven out by the Mamluks after the Battle of Ain Jalut in 1260, who in turn were defeated by the Ottoman Empire in the early 16th century.

Sharafkhan Bidlisi's 1596 epic of Kurdish history from the late 13th century to his own day, the Sharafnama, describes Kurdistan as extending from the Persian Gulf to the Ottoman vilayets of Malatya and Marash (Kahramanmaraş), a wide definition that counts the Lurs as Kurds and which takes an extreme expansionist view of the south. Lying to either side of the Gulf–Anatolia line were the vilayets of Diyarbekir, Mosul, "non-Arab Iraq", "Arab Iraq", Fars, Azerbaijan, Lesser Armenia, and Greater Armenia. Ahmad Khani's 1692 epic Mem û Zîn offers a similar conception of geography. In the 19th century poetry of Haji Qadir Koyi, literary Kurdistan extended across the north of later mandatory Syria, including Nusaybin and Alexandretta (İskenderun) on the Mediterranean Sea's Gulf of Alexandretta.

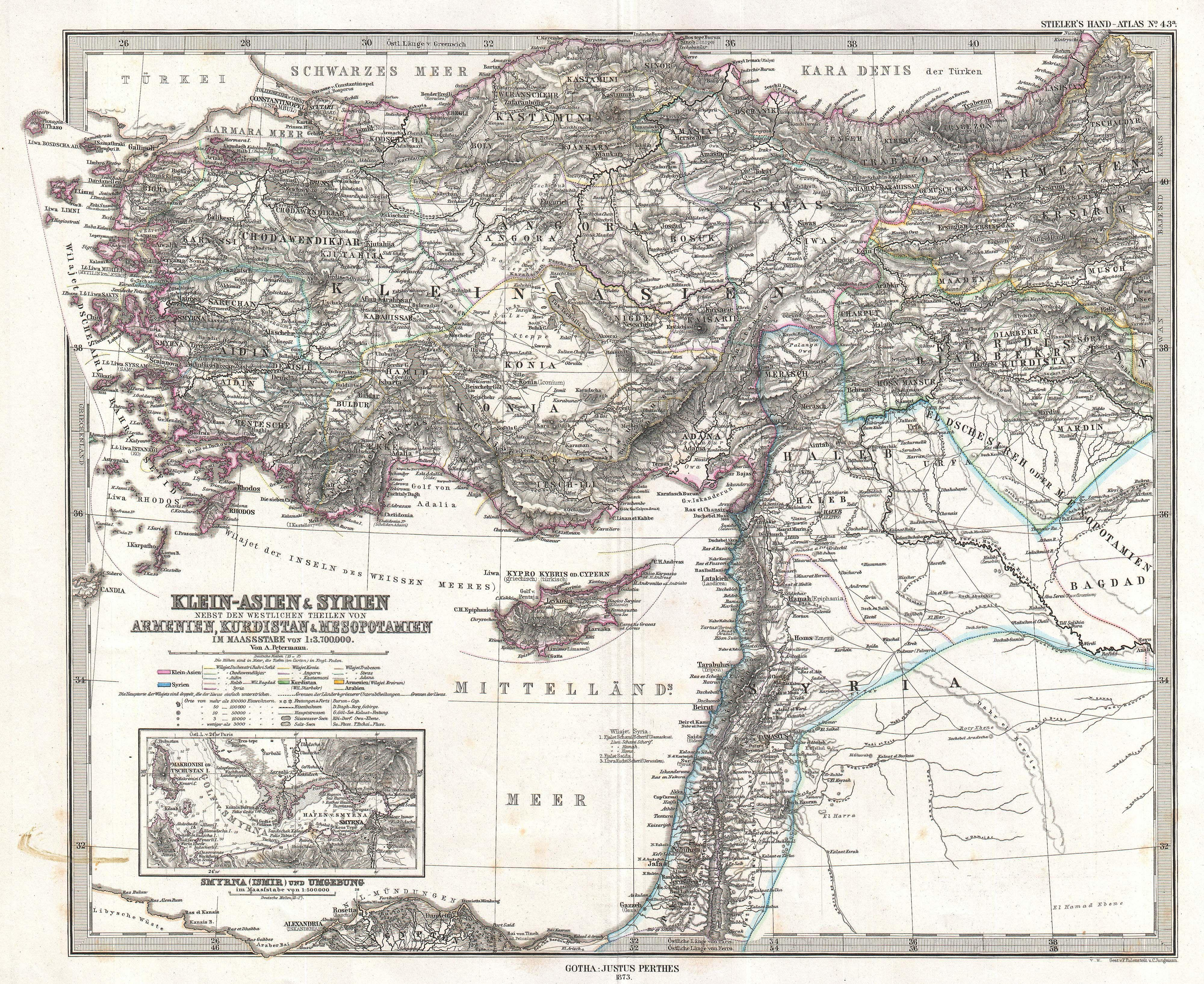
1873 Stieler Map of Asia Minor, showing Kurdistan in green

At the beginning of the 17th century, land on either side of the Euphrates was settled by Kurds forced to migrate there at the Ottoman Sultans' behest from lands elsewhere within the empire. The area on the river's right bank was the main focus of settlement, especially around Kobanî. In the 18th century, some of the Kurdish tribes of Greater Syria (or Bilad al-Sham) remained closely related to those of neighbouring areas of Kurdistan, but some others were assimilated with local Arab tribes. The German cartographer and Explorer Carsten Niebuhr, visited Jazira in 1764. Published a map showing his itinerary and mentioning five Kurdish tribes (Dukurie, Kikie, Schechchanie, Mullie and Aschetie).

=== French mandate for Syria (1920–1946) ===
World War I (1914–1918) had a significant impact on the Kurds. The victorious Allies partitioned the defeated Ottoman Empire, dividing its Kurdish-inhabited areas among new nation-states such as Syria, Turkey, and Iraq. In 1916, before the war had been won, Britain and France made a secret deal to divide the Middle East, known as the Sykes–Picot Agreement, which influenced Middle East borders for a century and came to symbolize the victimization and manipulation of Kurds by British and French imperialists. The first encounter between the French Armed Forces and Kurds in Syria came in late 1919 in the Kurd Mountains, which the French were able to pass through without much difficulty. In the Jazira, French troops were resisted more effectively.

At the end of the fighting between the Ottoman Empire during World War I and the United Kingdom, the French Third Republic, and the Arab Revolt, the territory of modern-day Syria and Iraq had been occupied by the Allies, and a Kurdish political and territorial entity was proposed. However, since neither Britain nor France was willing to withdraw from occupied areas of the Occupied Enemy Territory Administration, the territory allotted to the Kurds was to be located wholly in areas still under Turkish control at the time of the first partition of the Ottoman Empire by the Treaty of Sèvres in August 1920. The treaty, which was never ratified, would have created an independent Kurdistan under French patronage in Turkey without including Kurdish areas in Syria, Iraq, or Iran.

The Treaty of Sèvres was opposed by the Turkish National Movement, a coalition of Turkish revolutionaries led by Mustafa Kemal Atatürk and his Kemalist followers. In 1921, France and the Turkish National Movement signed the Treaty of Ankara, ending the Franco-Turkish War and moving the border between Turkey and French Syria further south than provided by the Treaty of Sèvres. Both France and Turkey cultivated relations with the area's tribes in the hope of establishing territorial claims. The Franco-Turkish agreement was ratified by the multiparty 1923 Treaty of Lausanne, which made no provision for an independent or autonomous Kurdish region, instead dividing the Kurdish areas of the Ottoman Empire between the new states of Turkey, Syria (under the French-controlled Mandate for Syria and the Lebanon), and British-controlled Mandatory Iraq.

The new Turkish–Syrian border, set largely along the Berlin–Baghdad railway line between Mosul and Aleppo, divided both Arabic and Kurdish communities, leaving Arab enclaves in Turkey and Kurdish enclaves in Syria. To this day, Kurds on either side of the border do not refer to themselves as "Syrian" or "Turkish"; rather, for Turkish Kurds, Syria is Bin Xhet (below the line), and for Syrian Kurds, Turkey is Ser Xhet (above the line). South of the rail line, Syrian Kurdistan was created as "a waste product of the colonial division of the Middle East", in the words of German cultural anthropologist Thomas Schmidinger.

Under the mandate, the French had authority over three Kurdish-populated areas left on the southern side of the new line, namely the areas of the Kurd Mountains (or Kurd-Dagh), Jarabulus, and the French Mandate territory in Upper Mesopotamia (the Northern Jazira). From the beginning of the Syrian state under the French Mandate, the geographical discontinuity of the Kurdish territory, as well as its relative smallness compared with the Kurdish areas of Iraq and Turkey, shaped much of the region's subsequent history. According to Jordi Tejel, "These three Kurdish enclaves constituted ... a natural extension of Kurdish territory into Turkey and Iraq".

The new borders did not significantly impact Kurdish tribesmen in the area at the time because the placement of Kurdish communities under two different governments separated them but did not physically sever them. However, developments north of the line in Turkey profoundly affected Syrian Kurds. In the 1920s and 1930s, Kemalist repression and failed Kurdish uprisings such as the Sheikh Said rebellion (1925) and the Ararat rebellion (1927–1930) resulted in many Kurds fleeing or being exiled from Turkey to Syria. The French mandate was not popular in France, and the local High Commissioner of the Levant sought to increase the profitability of the territory by resettling Kurds fleeing Kemalists in Turkey and other refugees in Jazira, a decision that resulted in the politicization of Kurdish ethnicity in Syria.

French military efforts were hindered by propaganda favouring Turkey distributed among Kurdish and Arab tribes. Resistance to the French in the Jazira continued until 1926. By 1927, the Kurdish-majority villages of the area numbered 47. (The numbers of Kurds and Kurdish villages grew significantly in the Interwar period.)

During the 1920s, use of the Latin alphabet to write the Kurdish languages was introduced by Celadet Bedir Khan and his brother Kamuran Alî Bedirxan and became standard in Syrian and Turkish Kurdistan. Early French Syria's Kurds were predominantly speakers of Kurmanji, a northern Kurdish language. Besides the main three Kurdish enclaves, there were other Syrian Kurds outside Syrian Kurdistan; primarily these were resident in the major cities of Aleppo (like the Alawite Kurds) and Damascus, though Yazidi Kurds inhabited Jabal Sam'an and others were nomads. Just as their districts were fragmented, the Kurdish inhabitants of Syria in the French mandatory period were heterogenous, and refugees arriving from Turkish and Iraqi Kurdistan helped foster Kurdish political consciousness, engendering a "pan-Kurdism" that complemented pre-existing Kurdish identities. The immigration from Kurdish areas outside Syria increased the Kurdish component of the population in Jazira.

In 1924, a delegate from Kurd Dagh made the first petition to the French authorities for autonomy for Kurdish-majority regions in Syria. In 1927, Kurdish exiles from Turkey in Beirut founded Xoybûn, a secular pan-Kurdish movement that became the intellectual foundation of Kurdish nationalism. Although Xoybûn pursued a military revolt in Turkish Kurdistan, it advocated for local autonomy for Kurds in Syria. Xoybûn was popular in Syrian Kurdistan, and in 1931, Xoybûn delegates were elected from Kurd Dagh, Jarablus, and Jazira. The French government rejected the Kurdish petitions for autonomy.

France negotiated a Treaty of Independence with the First Syrian Republic in 1936, but the onset of World War II prevented its implementation. France was occupied by Germany in 1940, and the French mandate was seized by Vichy France. Allied forces retook Syria in 1941 and recognized the Syrian Arab Republic as independent and sovereign within the French mandate. Xoybûn had remained active during the war years but disbanded in 1946.

An academic source published by the University of Cambridge has described maps of greater Kurdistan created in the 1940s and forward as: "These maps have become some of the most influential propaganda tools for the Kurdish nationalist discourse. They depict a territorially exaggerated version of the territory of Kurdistan, extending into areas with no majority Kurdish populations. Despite their production with political aims related to specific claims on the demographic and ethnographic structure of the region, and their questionable methodologies, they have become 'Kurdistan in the minds of Kurds' and the boundaries they indicate have been readily accepted."

=== Syrian independence (1946) ===
Syria gained independence in 1946.

The first popular Kurdish national party in Syria was the Kurdistan Democratic Party of Syria (KDPS), formed in 1957, which soon changed its name to the "Kurdish Democratic Party of Syria" and maintained a "Syrianized" agenda whose objective was not the "liberation" of Syrian Kurdistan but the improvement of conditions for Syrian Kurds. The academic historian Jordi Tejel has identified "Greater Kurdistan" as being one of the "Kurdish myths" that the KDPS were involved in promoting to Kurds in Syria.

=== Ba'athist Syria (1963–2011) ===
In 1963, the ultra-nationalistic Ba'ath Party launched a successful coup. In 1970, Hafez al-Assad seized power in a subsequent coup. From 1973 onwards, the Arab Belt policy was applied which included the Arabization of a between 10 and 15 kilometers wide border strip between Ras al Ayn and Al-Malikiyah and the expropriation of territories owned by Kurds and the establishment of dozens of Arab villages. In 1976, the Arab Belt policy was abandoned by al Assad, but the already executed resettlements were not reversed by al Assad.

In 1978, north of the rail line, the Kurdistan Workers' Party (PKK) was founded by Abdullah Öcalan, seeking to establish an independent Kurdish state in Turkey. Assad, who had disputes with Turkey over issues such as the use of the Euphrates and Tigris rivers, allowed the PKK to operate from Syria in exchange for the PKK focusing its efforts in Turkish Kurdistan and not Syria. According to Tejel, as a result, "Northern Syria became a breeding ground for PKK militants during the 1980s and 1990s".

The idea of a Syrian territory being part of a "Kurdistan" or "Syrian Kurdistan" gained more widespread support among Syrian Kurds in the 1980s and 1990s. Several smaller Kurdish political movements in Syria, amongst them the Yekiti and the Azadi, began to organize manifestations in cities with a large Kurdish population demanding a better treatment of the Kurdish population while advocating for a recognition of a "Syrian Kurdistan". This development was fueled by the Kurdistan Workers' Party (PKK) that strengthened Kurdish nationalist ideas in Syria, whereas local Kurdish parties had previously lacked success in promoting "a clear political project" related to a Kurdish identity, partially due to political repression by the Syrian government.

Cooperation between Assad and the PKK ended in the late 1990s when Turkey moved its military to the Syrian border and demanded Öcalan's extradition. Öcalan was exiled from Syria, captured by the Turks in Kenya and imprisoned.

In 2000, Hafez al-Assad was succeeded by his son Bashar al-Assad.

In 2003, the Democratic Union Party (PYD) was founded as a Syrian affiliate of the PKK. Despite the role of the PKK in initially spreading the concept of "Syrian Kurdistan", the PYD (the Syrian "successor" of the PKK), generally refrained from calling for the establishment of "Syrian Kurdistan". As the PKK and PYD call for the removal of national borders in general, the two parties believed that there was no need for the creation of a separate "Syrian Kurdistan", as their internationalist project would allow for the unification of Kurdistan through indirect means.

=== Syrian civil war (2011–2024) ===
Some observers see Syrian Kurdistan as a concept emerging from the Syrian civil war, which started in 2011. The concept of a Syrian Kurdistan gained even more relevance after the Syrian civil war's start, as Kurdish-inhabited areas in northern Syria fell under the control of Kurdish-dominated factions. The PYD established an autonomous administration in northern Syria which it eventually began to call "Rojava" or "West Kurdistan". By 2014, many local Kurds used this name synonymously to northeastern Syria. Non-PYD parties such as the KNC also began to raise demands for the establishment of Syrian Kurdistan as separate area, raising increasing concerns by Syrian nationalists and some observers who regarded these plans as attempts to divide Syria. As the PYD-led administration gained control over increasingly ethnically diverse areas, however, the use of "Rojava" for the merging proto-state was gradually reduced in official contexts. Regardless, the polity continued to be called Rojava by locals and international observers, with journalist Metin Gurcan noting that "the concept of Rojava [had become] a brand gaining global recognition" by 2019. Tejel has described "Kurdistan and the concept of Greater Kurdistan" as "a powerful amalgam of myths, facts and ambitions".

== Geography ==
Location of Kurdish-speaking communities in the Middle East (Le Monde diplomatique, 2007)

Syrian Kurdistan comprises three noncontiguous enclaves along the Turkish and Iraqi borders: Afrin in the northwest, Kobani in the north, and Jazira in the northeast. The enclave in the northwest corner of the country is referred to as Afrin after its main city, and includes the surrounding plains and Kurd Mountains (Kurd Dagh). The north-central enclave along the Euphrates river near Jarabulus is also named after its main city, Kobanî. In the northeast, Jazira (meaning "island", due to its location between the Euphrates and Tigris rivers) includes the cities of Al-Hasakah and Qamishli, the de facto capital of Syrian Kurdistan. All three enclaves border Turkish Kurdistan to the north, while Jazira also borders Iraqi Kurdistan to the east.

According to the Crisis Group, the term Rojava "refers to the western area of 'Kurdistan'", namely those in Syria. Although the concept of an independent Kurdistan as homeland of the Kurdish people has a long history, the extent of said territory has been disputed over time. Kurds have lived in territories which later became part of modern Syria for centuries, and following the partition of the Ottoman Empire, the Kurdish population before living in the Ottoman Empire, was divided between its successor states Turkey, Iraq and Syria. Local Kurdish parties generally maintained ideologies which stayed in a firmly Syrian framework, and did not aspire to create a separate Syrian Kurdistan. In the 1920s, there were two separate demands for an autonomy of the areas with a Kurdish majority. One of Nouri Kandy, an influential Kurd from the Kurd Dagh, and another one of the Kurdish tribal leaders of the Barazi confederation. Both demands were not taken into consideration by the authorities of the French Mandate. According to Tejel, until the 1980s Kurdish-inhabited areas of Syria were mainly regarded as "Kurdish regions of Syria".

The historian and political scientist Matthieu Cimino has stated that: "Rojava" (Syrian Kurdistan) is part of a mythology of pan-Kurdish unity which does not constitute a political objective for the Syrian Kurds in itself, but is rather a "cultural abstract"".

In the 20th century, Kurdistan was usually only included areas in Turkey and Iraq. The Kurdish-inhabited areas in northern Syria are adjacent to "Turkish Kurdistan" in the north and "Iraqi Kurdistan" in the east.

By 2013, "Rojava" had become synonymous with PYD-ruled areas, regardless of ethnic majorities. For the most part, the term was used to refer to the "non-contiguous Kurdish-populated areas" in the region. In 2015 a map by Kurdish National Council (KNC) member Nori Brimo was published which largely mirrored the Ekurd Daily's maps, but also included the Hatay Province. The claimed map includes large swaths of Arab-majority areas.

== Economy ==
=== Climate and resources ===
Annual temperatures in Syrian Kurdistan are between 15 and 20 degrees Celsius (59 and 68 degrees Fahrenheit). The geographical area is economically important to the state. Syrian Kurdistan is rich in natural resources, such as coal, oil, natural gas, potential hydro-electric river power, and minerals including phosphates, lignite, copper, iron, and chrome. Lying between Orontes, Euphrates and Tigris rivers, the area contains productive arable farmland, giving the region the appellation of the "granary" of Syria. Similarly, the adjacent Iraqi Kurdistan is known as the granary of Iraq. Kurd Dagh is well known for the olives, olive oil, and other products derived from its more than 13 million olive trees.

== Demographics ==
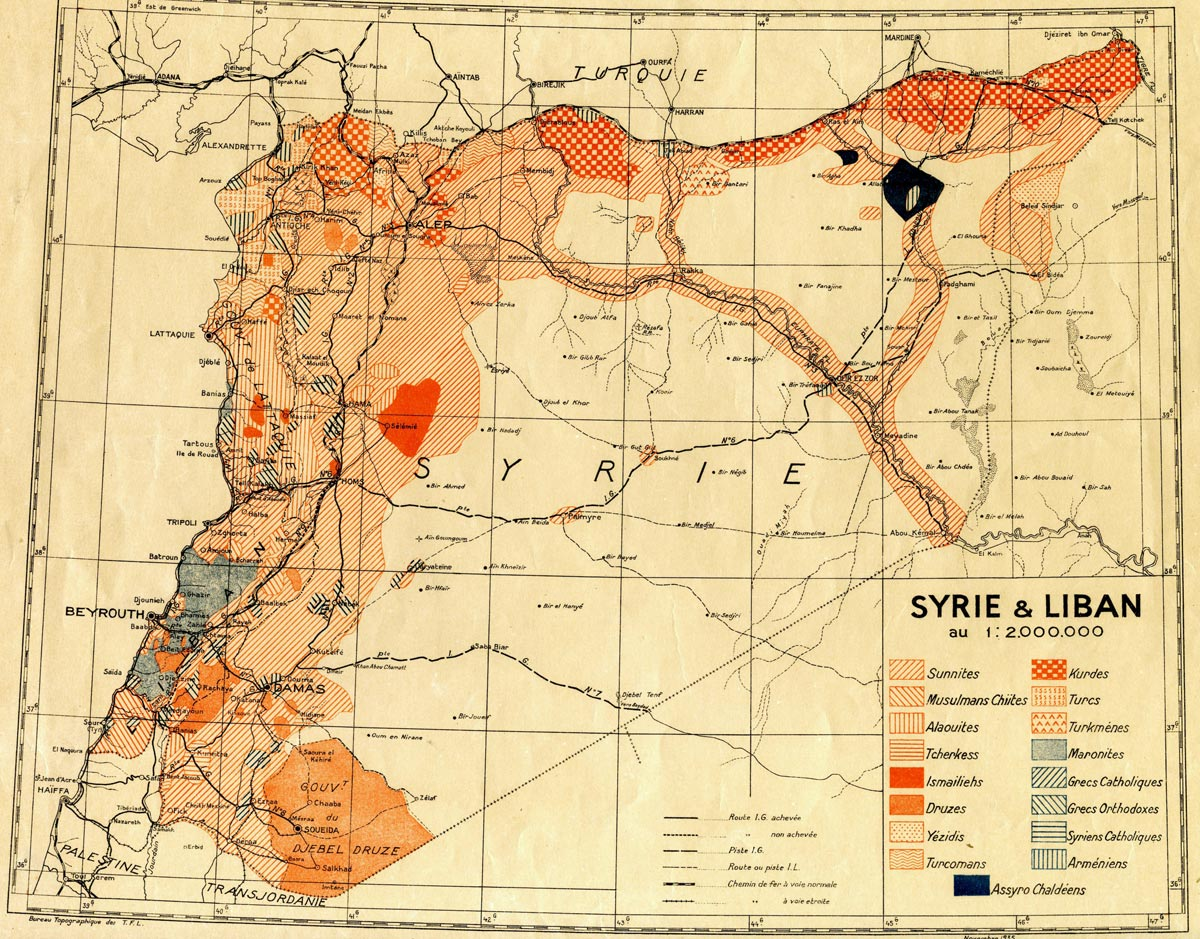
Map of ethno-religious groups in Syria and Lebanon during the French Mandate in 1935, with the Kurds concentrated on the border with the Republic of Turkey

Population figures for Kurds in Syria are contentious and politicized. No census since the French mandate has included ethnic identity. Due to a lack of reliable data, only estimates can be given. Most population estimates of Syrian Kurds range between 1.5 and 3.5 million, or about 8–15% of Syria's total population of 22 million.

Northern Syria is an ethnically diverse region. Kurds constitute one of several groups which have lived in northern Syria since antiquity or the Middle Ages. (Note: It is difficult to properly define early Kurds, as "Kurdish" was often used as a catch-all word for nomadic tribal groups west of Iran during antiquity and medieval times.) The first Kurdish communities constituted a minority and mostly consisted of nomads or military colonists. During the Ottoman Empire (1516–1922), large Kurdish-speaking tribal groups both settled in and were deported to areas of northern Syria from Anatolia. The last years of Ottoman rule witnessed extensive demographic changes in northern Syria as a result of the Assyrian genocide and mass migrations. Many Assyrians fled to Syria during the genocide and settled mainly in the Jazira area.

Starting in 1926, the region saw another immigration of Kurds following the failure of the Sheikh Said rebellion against the Turkish authorities. Waves of Kurds fled their homes in Turkey and settled in Syrian Al-Jazira Province, where they were granted citizenship by the authorities of the French Mandate for Syria and the Lebanon. The number of Kurds settled in the Jazira province during the 1920s was estimated at 20,000 to 25,000 people, out of 100,000 inhabitants, with the remainder of the population being Christians (Armenian and Assyrian) and Arabs. According to Michael Gunter, many Kurds still do not see themselves as belonging to either the Turkish or Syrian Kurdistan, but rather as one who originates from "above the line" (Kurdish: Ser Xhet) or "below the line" (Kurdish:Bin Xhet).

French mandate authorities gave the new Kurdish refugees considerable rights and encouraged minority autonomy as part of a divide and rule strategy and recruited heavily from the Kurds and other minority groups, such as Alawite and Druze, for its local armed forces. French Mandate authorities encouraged their immigration and granted them Syrian citizenship. Giving Syrian nationality to refugees by French mandate authorities was legally required so that refugees could be hired as employees of the Syrian state (Armenians as clerks and interpreters and Kurds as gendarmes) but also to receive grants of state land by mandate authorities.

The French official reports show the existence of at most 45 Kurdish villages in Jazira prior to 1927. A new wave of refugees arrived in 1929. The mandatory authorities continued to encourage Kurdish immigration into Syria, and by 1939, the villages numbered between 700 and 800 due to several successive Kurdish immigration waves from Turkey. The French authorities themselves generally organized the settlement of the refugees. One of the most important of these plans was carried out in Upper Jazira in northeastern Syria where the French built new towns and villages (such as Qamishli) with the intention of housing the refugees considered to be "friendly". This has encouraged the non-Turkish minorities that were under Turkish pressure to leave their ancestral homes and property, they could find refuge and rebuild their lives in relative safety in neighboring Syria.

These successive Kurdish immigrations from Turkey led the Ba'ath Party to think about Arabization policies in northern Syria, settling 4000 farmer families from areas inundated by the Tabqa Dam in Raqqa Governorate in al-Hasakah Governorate Mass migration also took place during the Syrian civil war. Accordingly, estimates as to the ethnic composition of northern Syria vary widely, ranging from claims about a Kurdish majority to claims about Kurds being a small minority.

Roughly half a million Kurds were concentrated in Syrian Kurdistan in the 1970s. At that time, Kurds represented around 10% of Syria's population, living mainly in these "well-defined areas" on the northern border.

== See also ==
- Arab Belt
- Kurds in Syria
- A Modern History of the Kurds by David McDowall
