= Al-Jawadiyah Subdistrict =

Al-Jawadiyah Subdistrict ناحية الجوادية
- Subdistrict
- Location of Al-Jawadiyah Subdistrict within al-Hasakah Governorate

- Location in Syria
- Coordinates (Al-Jawadiyah): 37°02′13″N 41°46′38″E
- Country: Syria
- Governorate: al-Hasakah
- District: Jawadiyah
- Seat: Al-Jawadiyah

Population (2004)
  - Total: 40,535
- Geocode: SY080301

Al-Jawadiyah Subdistrict (Arabic: ناحية الجوادية, Kurdish: Navçeya Çilaxa) is a subdistrict of Al-Malikiyah District in northeastern al-Hasakah Governorate, northeastern Syria. The administrative centre for the subdistrict is the town of Al-Jawadiyah.

At the 2004 census, the subdistrict had a population of 40,535. The majority of the subdistrict's population is Kurdish.
