= Rojava =

Rojava may refer to:

- Syrian Kurdistan, also known as Rojava, the geographical region where Kurds historically settled within present-day Syria
- Democratic Autonomous Administration of North and East Syria, a de facto autonomous region in northeastern Syria that was sometimes called Rojava
