= Arab Belt project =

Ba'athist ethnic cleansing policy in Syrian Kurdistan

Arab Belt الحزام العربي
- Al-Hasakah Governorate highlighted in red
- Date: 1973–1976
- Location: Al-Hasakah Governorate, Syria
- Type: Forced deportations
- Motive: Arab nationalism, Arabization, Ba'athification
- Perpetrator: Ba'athist Syria
- Organized by: Arab Socialist Ba'ath Party; Syrian Arab Armed Forces
- Outcome: 120,000 Kurds deprived of Syrian citizenship in 1962; Hafez al-Assad orders the launch of Arab Belt program in 1973; Deportation of 140,000 Kurds and replacement with Arab settlers from Raqqa; 4,000 Arab families settled in new villages in 1973; Tabqa Dam built by the Syrian government in 1973
- Target: Syrian Kurds

The Arab Belt (Arabic: الحزام العربي, romanized: al-hizām al-ʿarabī; Kurdish: که‌مبه‌را عه‌ره‌بی, romanized: Kembera Erebî) was a project undertaken by Ba'athist Syria, which aimed to Arabize the northern areas of the Al-Hasakah Governorate, to the detriment of other ethnic groups, particularly the Kurds.

It primarily involved the expulsion of Kurds from public land used as pasture, and the settlement of Arabs, in their place. The program was implemented in 1973; deporting around 140,000 Kurds and confiscating their lands around a 180-mile strip. Thousands of Arabs—around 4,000 families who were displaced by the creation of Euphrates Lake in Raqqa—were then granted these lands to establish settlements.

== Background ==
During Ottoman rule in 1517–1917, the interior of Upper Mesopotamia (lands south of the Baghdad–Berlin railway line, east of the Euphrates, and west of the Tigris) was a "no man's land", incorporated de jure under the Mosul, Aleppo, and Diyarbekir Ottoman vilayets as well as the Deir Ez-Zor Sanjak.

Primarily, the region was inhabited by the semi-nomadic Arab tribes of Shammar and Tayy (see 1907 map below). However, the northern and eastern fringes, near Mosul and Mardin, were populated by Syriac-speaking Aramean and Assyrian Christians as well as Muslim Arab Bedouins of the aforementioned Arab tribes. As John G. Taylor states in 1866: "The northern part of Mesopotamia, in which Nisibin is situated, is peopled by Arabs and Turcomans". Taylor counts the Arabs as a total of 81,000 (souls) in 13500 households (tents). As for the Turcomans, who he comments "are erroneously called Kurds", their population is detailed as 1600 tents mostly centered around Veyranshehr. He also provided a table illustrating the ratio of Arabs to Kurds as 2.3:1, see below.

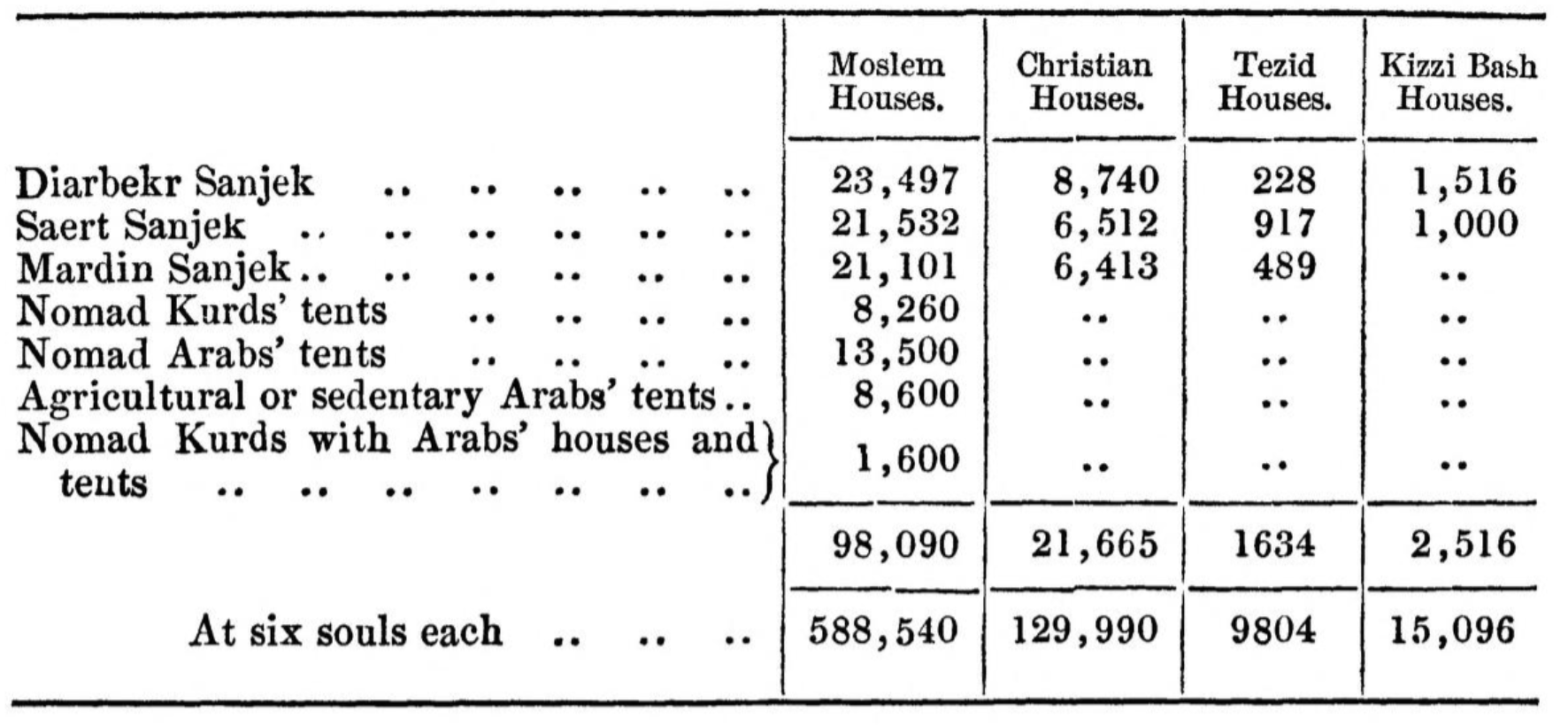
Table of Diyarbakir Vilayet demographics as provided in John G. Taylor's 1861-1866 expeditions book "Armenia and Upper Mesopotamia"

During the 19th century, however, large Kurdish-speaking tribal groups both settled in and were deported to areas of northern Syria from eastern Anatolia and the northwestern areas of the Zagros. The largest of these tribal groups was the powerful Reshwan tribe, which was initially based in Adıyaman Province. Clans from another Anatolian tribe, the Milli confederation mentioned in 1518 onward, moved into the area.

Upon the fall of the Ottoman Empire at the end of World War I, the Jazirah was divided into three parts, between Turkey, Syria, and Iraq. All three new nation-states left the region as a hinterland with little to no government attention or subsidies; even in the 21st century literacy rates and household income exhibit a stark difference between those regions and other regions.

In the 1920s, the number of Kurds in the Syrian Jazirah was estimated from 20,000 to 25,000 people, out of 100,000 inhabitants. In 1927, there were exactly 47 Kurdish-majority villages and towns. By 1929, following Kurdish expulsion from Turkey under Kemalist policies and the failure of the Sheikh Said rebellion (1925) and the Ararat rebellion (1927–1930), these now numbered over 800. Some Kurdish Alevis, fleeing the persecution of the Turkish army during the Dersim massacre, also settled in Afrin and Mabeta in the 1930s. This was all directly supported by the French High Commissioner of the Levant through the Terrier Plan in order to increase the profits of the area as well as to "divide and conquer".

Danish writer C. Niebuhr who traveled to Arabia and Upper Mesopotanmia in 1764 recorded five nomadic Kurdish tribes (Dukurie, Kikie, Schechchanie, Mullie and Aschetie) and six Arab tribes (Tay, Kaab, Baggara, Geheish, Diabat and Sherabeh) in the area around Mardin. According to Niebuhr, the Kurdish tribes were settled near Mardin in Turkey, and paid the governor of that city for the right to graze their herds in the Syrian Jazira.

Thus, due to Ottoman policies and a general trend of sedentary urbanisation of nomadic peoples, the Kurdish tribes gradually settled in villages and cities and are still present in the modern governorate.

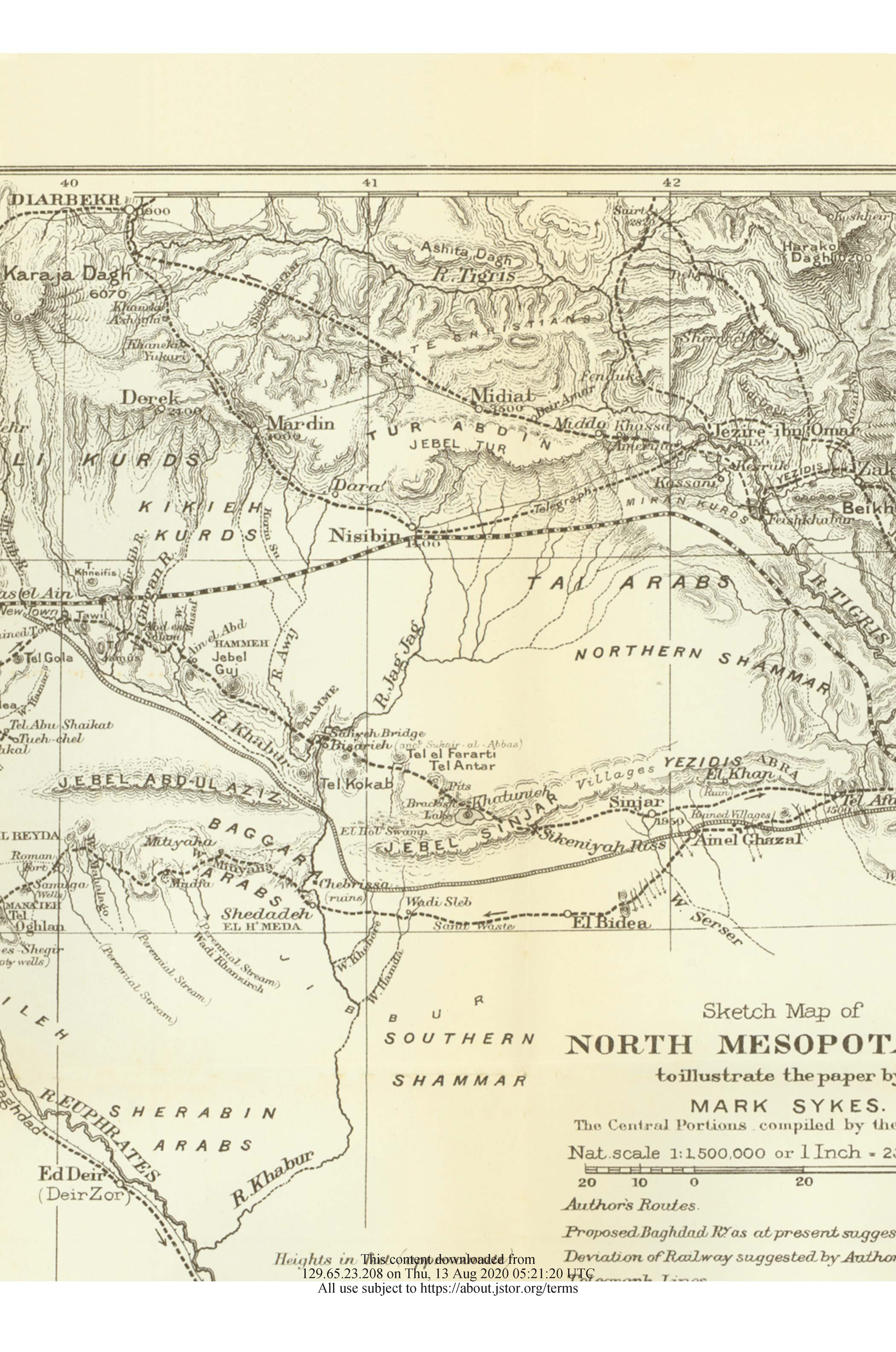
Map drawn for Mark Sykes in 1907 showing the distribution of Arab and Kurdish tribes in upper Mesopotamia (including Jazira province) with the train tracks to become border separating Turkey (to the north) from Syria (to the south)

== Since World War I ==
The demographics of northern Syria saw a huge shift in the early part of the 20th century when the Ottoman Empire conducted ethnic cleansing of its Armenian and Assyrian Christian populations and some Kurdish tribes joined in the atrocities committed against them. Many Assyrians fled to Syria during the genocide and settled mainly in the Jazira area. During WWI and subsequent years, thousands of Assyrians fled their homes in Anatolia after massacres. After that, massive waves of Kurds fled their homes in Turkey due to conflict with Kemalist authorities and settled in Syria, where they were granted citizenship by the French Mandate authorities as part of the Terrier Plan aiming at creating a Kurdish belt along the Turkish border. The first wave of Kurds settled in the Jazira province during around 1925 was estimated at 20,000 people. Starting in 1926, the region witnessed another huge immigration wave of Kurds following the failure of the Sheikh Said rebellion against the Turkish authorities. Tens of thousands of Kurds fled their homes in Turkey and settled in Syria, and as usual, were granted citizenship by the French mandate authorities. This large influx of Kurds moved to Syria's Jazira province. It is estimated that 25,000 Kurds fled at this time to Syria. The French official reports show the existence of at most 45 Kurdish villages in Jazira prior to 1927. A new wave of refugees arrived in 1929. The mandatory authorities continued to encourage Kurdish immigration into Syria, and by 1939, the villages numbered between 700 and 800. French authorities were not opposed to the streams of Assyrians, Armenians or Kurds who, for various reasons, had left their homes and had found refuge in Syria. The French authorities themselves generally organized the settlement of the refugees. One of the most important of these plans was carried out in Upper Jazira in northeastern Syria where the French built new towns and villages (such as Qamishli) were built with the intention of housing the refugees considered to be “friendly”. This has encouraged the non-Turkish minorities that were under Turkish pressure to leave their ancestral homes and property, they could find refuge and rebuild their lives in relative safety in neighboring Syria. Consequently, the border areas in al-Hasakah Governorate started to have a Kurdish majority, while Arabs remained the majority in river plains and elsewhere.

In 1939, French mandate authorities reported the following population numbers for the different ethnic and religious groups in al-Hasakah governorate.

District	Arab	Kurd	Christian	Armenian	Yezidi	Assyrian
Hasakah city centre	7133	360	5700	500		
Tel Tamer						8767
Ras al-Ayn	2283	1025	2263			
Shaddadi	2610		6			
Tel Brak	4509	905		200		
Qamishli city centre	7990	5892	14,140	3500	720	
Amuda		11,260	1500		720	
Derbasiyeh	3011	7899	2382		425	
Shager Bazar	380	3810	3			
Ain Diwar		3608	900			
Derik (later renamed al-Malikiyah)	44	1685	1204			
Mustafiyya	344	959	50			
Derouna Agha	570	5097	27			
Tel Koger (later renamed Al-Yaarubiyah)	165					

The population of the governorate reached 155,643 in 1949, including about 60,000 Kurds. These continuous waves swelled the number of Kurds in the area who represented 37% of the Al-Hasakah province population in a 1939 French authorities census. In 1953, French geographers Fevret and Gibert estimated that out of the total 146,000 inhabitants of this area, agriculturalist Kurds made up 60,000 (41%), semi-sedentary and nomad Arabs 50,000 (34%), and a quarter of the population were Christians.

Historical population
Year	Pop.	±%
1931	44,153	—
1933	64,886	+47.0%
1935	94,596	+45.8%
1937	98,144	+3.8%
1938	103,514	+5.5%
1939	106,052	+2.5%
1940	126,508	+19.3%
1942	136,107	+7.6%
1943	146,001	+7.3%
1946	151,137	+3.5%
1950	159,300	+5.4%
1953	232,104	+45.7%
1960	351,661	+51.5%
1970	468,506	+33.2%
1981	669,756	+43.0%
2004	1,275,118	+90.4%
2011	1,512,000	+18.6%

=== Censuses of 1943 and 1953 ===
Syrian censuses of 1943 and 1953 in Al-Jazira province (today's Al-Hasakah governorate)
Religious group		Population (1943)	Percentage (1943)	Population (1953)	Percentage (1953)
Muslims	Sunni Muslims	99,665	68.26%	171,058	73.70%
Muslims	Other Muslims	437	0.30%	503	0.22%
Christians	Syriac Orthodox & Syriac Catholic	31,764	21.76%	42,626	18.37%
Christians	Armenians	9,788	6.70%	12,535	5.40%
Christians	Other churches	944	0.65%	1,283	0.55%
Christians	Total Christians	42,496	29.11%	56,444	24.32%
Jews		1,938	1.33%	2,350	1.01%
Yazidis		1,475	1.01%	1,749	0.75%
TOTAL	Al-Jazira province	146,001	100.0%	232,104	100.0%

Among the Sunni Muslims, mostly Kurds and Arabs, there were about 1,500 Circassians in 1938.

As a result, to the Kurdish immigration to this area of Syria, the population of these areas became more heterogeneous. Moreover, irregular Kurds volunteered in the French mandate together with other ethnic or religious minorities, including Armenian and Kurdish irregulars

== After WWII ==
The Syrian government believed that there was a new wave of Kurdish infiltrating into al-Hasakeh governorate in 1945. Syrian government documents indicate the immigrants "came singly and in groups from neighboring countries, especially Turkey, crossing illegally along the border from Ras al'Ain to al-Malikiyya. Gradually and illegally, they settled down in the region along the border in major population centers such as Dirbasiyya, Amuda and Malikiyya." As usual, many of these Kurds were able to register themselves illegally in the Syrian civil registers. They were also able to obtain Syrian identity cards through a variety of means, with the help of their relatives and members if their tribes. They did so with the intent of settling down and acquiring property, especially after the issue of the Agrarian Reform Law No. 161 during the period of Egyptian-Syrian unification in 1958–1961, a socialist measure aimed at setting a maximum limit on agricultural land ownership. Official figures available in 1961 showed that in a mere seven-year period, between 1954 and 1961, the population of al-Hasakah governorate had increased from 240,000 to 305,000, an increase of 27 per cent which could not possibly be explained merely by natural increase.

== 1962 Census ==
The government claimed that Kurds from Turkey were "illegally infiltrating" the Jezireh in order to "destroy its Arab character". On 23 August 1962, the government decreed (decree no. 93) an extraordinary census of al-Jazira Province. If a person was not able to produce a document that proved they lived in Syrian before 1940, they were deemed illegal immigrants, mainly from Turkey. As part of this census on the 5 October 1962, 120,000 Kurds in the province were deprived of their Syrian citizenship. The Syrian Government later admitted mistakes were made during the census, but didn't reinstate citizenry.

The census indicated the real population was probably closer to 340,000. Although these figures may have been exaggerated, they were credible given the actual circumstances. From being lawless and virtually empty prior to 1914, the Jazira had proved to be astonishingly fertile once order was imposed by the French mandate and farming undertaken by the largely Kurdish population.... A strong suspicion that many migrants were entering Syria was inevitable. In Turkey the rapid mechanisation of farming had created huge unemployment and massive labour migration from the 1950s onwards. The fertile but not yet cultivated lands of northern Jazira must have been a strong enticement and the affected frontier was too long feasibly to police it.

A decision was made by the Ba'athist government in 1965 to build the 350 km long and 10–15 km wide Arab belt along the Syria–Turkey border. The planned belt stretched from the Iraqi border in the east to Ras al-Ayn in the west.

== Arab Settlements ==
After another coup within the Baath party, Hafez al-Assad emerged as the head of Ba'athist Syria in 1970. While the proposals in the Hilal report had officially been accepted by the Ba'athist government as early as 1965, it was Hafez al-Assad who ordered the implementation of the Arab Belt programme in 1973. The project's name was changed by the Assad government to "Plan to establish model state farms in the Jazira region". By the end of the programme, around 140,000 Kurds living in 332 villages were displaced from their homes by the Syrian government; and tens of thousands of Arabs - mostly from the Raqqa region- established settlements in the confiscated lands. The area of the project was a strip of land - almost 15 km in breadth - that extended over 375 km in length; across the north-eastern boundary-regions of Syria with Turkey and Iraq.

Fifteen state farms of the Pilot Project were built on lands expropriated in the barriya (which means wild area in Arabic ); a zone of pasture and dry farming. Most of its land belonged to members of the Hleissat, a formerly semi-nomadic Arab tribe that settled near Raqqa in the 1940s. Each state farm constituted a model village where farm labourers were paid and governed by a "council of production".

Villages were built to house 4,000 Arab families coming from the land that was to be submerged following the completion of the Tabqa Dam and the filling of Euphrates Lake. The Arabs were provided with weapons and divided between more than 50 so-called model farms in the Jazira Region and to the north of Raqqa. Twelve villages were built around Qamishli and Al-Malakiyah and sixteen around Ras al Ayn. Kurdish village names in the area were replaced by Arabic names not necessarily related to the traditions and history of the region. These Arabs are named as Maghmurin (مغمورين Maġmūrīn, which is affected by flooding). The campaign eventually faded out under Hafez al-Assad in 1976, but the deported Kurds were not allowed to return.
