= 2024 Rojava local elections =

Elections in Syria

- 8 August 2024
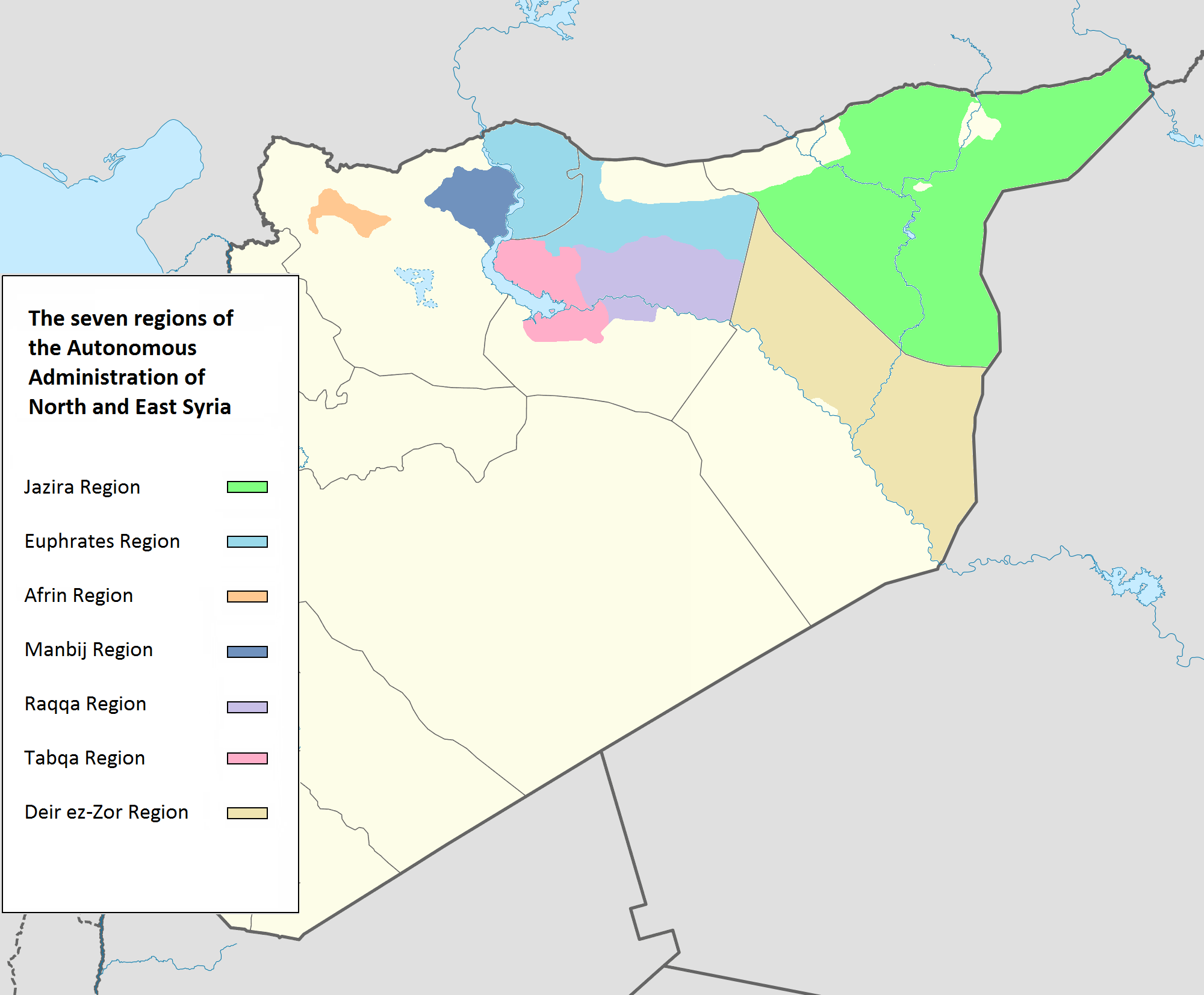
- Regions under the control of the Autonomous Administration of North and East Syria (AANES)

The 2024 Rojava local elections were set to be held on 8 August 2024. Seats and co-mayorships for 134 municipalities within the Democratic Autonomous Administration of North and East Syria (DAANES) seven regions were scheduled to be contested by 5,336 candidates. This was the last election intended to be held in the autonomous region before its integration into the Syrian state on 20 August 2026.

Initially set to be held on 30 May, the election was postponed to 11 June, and then to 8 August. It was ultimately not held.

== Background ==
The last election held in the region was the 2017 Rojava regional elections, with the planned federal election set for 19 January 2018 having been postponed indefinitely.

The 2024 local elections were to be held in the context of a new constitution (also referred to as the social contract) adopted in December 2023 by the Democratic Autonomous Administration of North and East Syria. Under the new constitution, the number of municipalities were increased from 122 to 192, but the election was not to be held in municipalities under Turkish occupation.

In response to the election, Turkish president Recep Tayyip Erdoğan threatened military action against the region, saying:

"Turkey will never allow the separatist organization to establish a 'terroristan' in the north of Syria and Iraq, just beyond its southern borders."

The decision to hold elections have also attracted opposition from Syria and the United States, with the latter urging the administration not to proceed with the election.

== Parties and alliances ==
The two alliances participating in the elections included the Peoples’ and Women's Alliance for Freedom and the Together for Better Service Alliance.

The Peoples’ and Women's Alliance for Freedom included the Zenobia Women's Gathering, Yazidi Syria Union, Democratic Conservative Party, Revolutionary Left Current in Syria, Syriac Union Party, Democratic Union Party, Future Syria Party, National Rally Party of Kurdistan, Kurdish Left Party in Syria, Arab National Authority, Kurdistan Democratic Party in Syria - Al-Parti, Democratic Peace Party of Kurdistan, Kurdish Democratic Party in Syria - Al-Parti, Kurdish Democratic Party - Syria, Modernity and Democracy Party of Syria, Kurdistan Democratic Change Party, Kongra Star, Syrian National Democratic Alliance, Assyrian Democratic Party, Armenian Social Council, Civil Justice Movement Party, and the Kurdistan Democratic Party - Western Kurdistan.

The Together for Better Service Alliance included the Green Democratic Party, Kurdistan Workers Union, Kurdistan Brotherhood Party, Democratic Kurdish Left Party in Syria, and the Kurdistan Renewal Movement - Syria.

The main opposition group the Kurdish National Council (ENKS) announced it would boycott the election, with a senior member saying "the elections will not be fair because the PYD is militarily powerful".

The four parties set to contest independent of any alliances included the Kurdish Democratic Unity Party in Syria (Yeketi), Syrian National Democratic Alliance (Taqba), National Democratic Development and Building Party, and the Syrian Homeland Party. 270 independent candidates also announced their candidacy.

== See also ==
- 2017 Rojava local elections
- 2015 Rojava local elections
