= Dêrik prison escape attempt =

ISIL prisoners revolt in mass escape attempt

- Part of the Rojava–Islamist conflict
- Date: 5 April 2019
- Location: Dêrik prison, al-Malikiyah (Dêrik), Syria
- Caused by: Prison escape attempt
- Methods: Prison revolt, hostage taking, melee
- Result: Revolt defeated, escape attempt foiled

Parties
Islamic State prisoners	Prison guards SDF reinforcements Support: United States Air Force

Number
c. 200	Unknown

The Dêrik prison escape attempt was an organized revolt at the detention center in al-Malikiyah (Dêrik), Syria on 5 April 2019, attempted by prisoners belonging to the Islamic State. The detainees launched a coordinated uprising to facilitate a breakout, but were foiled by the quick intervention of local security forces and the United States Air Force.

== Background ==
As the Syrian Democratic Forces (SDF), backed by the international CJTF–OIR coalition, defeated the Islamic State (IS) in a number of campaigns during the Syrian Civil War, thousands of IS members were captured and detained at several facilities throughout the Autonomous Administration of North and East Syria. One of the most secure detention centers for IS members is the Dêrik prison in al-Malikiyah, a town near the Iraq-Syria border, where about 400 IS fighters were held. These included many international jihadists, including 20 French citizens, some of whom had been involved in the 2012 Toulouse and November 2015 Paris attacks. The French detainees are believed to have been among the chief organisers of the prison escape.

== Escape attempt ==
On the morning of 5 April 2019, the prisoners took advantage of the lessened security during their toilet hour. About 200 detainees simultaneously attacked the prison guards in an attempt to take a guard hostage, and capture firearms to facilitate an escape. The local security forces quickly responded to the uprising, and sent many SDF reinforcements to Dêrik prison. The United States Air Force dispatched two fighter jets which flew on a low altitude over the prison to encourage the would-be escapees to surrender. After a few hours, the prison uprising was quelled, reportedly "peacefully". None of the prisoners managed to escape, though the attempt had reportedly come close to being successful.

== Aftermath ==
CJTF–OIR aircraft conducted aerial observation of the area after the escape attempt, ensuring that none of the inmates had fled. Security at Dêrik prison was heightened. The French prisoners were subsequently distributed to other detention centers at the request of the French government. This was done so that another organized escape attempt became less likely. SDF foreign relations official Redur Xelil stated that the escape attempt "shows that these people are terrorists, killers and constitute a danger, a situation we have repeatedly voiced before." He also once again requested on behalf of the SDF international help in managing the prisoners.

== See also ==
- Human rights in North and East Syria
