= Ain Diwar =

Ain Diwar عين ديوار
- Village
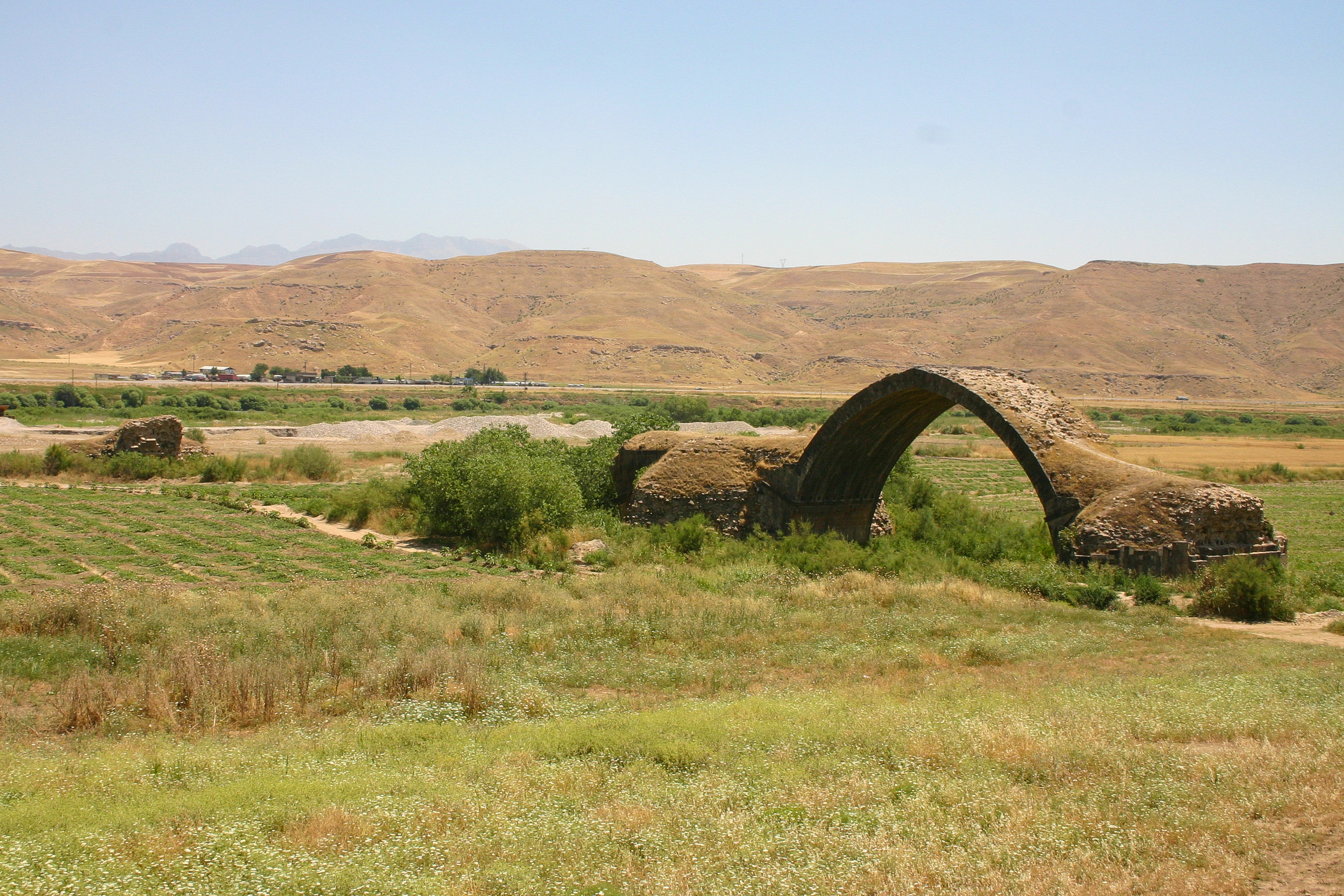
- Ain Diwar Bridge

- Location of Ain Diwar in Syria
- Coordinates: 37°17′07″N 42°11′32″E
- Country: Syria
- Governorate: al-Hasakah
- District: al-Malikiyah
- Subdistrict: al-Malikiyah

Population (2004)
  - Total: 938
- Time zone: UTC+2 (EET)
  - Summer (DST): UTC+3 (EEST)

Ain Diwar (Arabic: عين ديوار, romanized: Ain Diwar) is a village in the northeastern corner of Hasakah Governorate, northeastern Syria. It is located near the tri-border point with Iraq and Turkey.

At the 2004 census, Ain Diwar had a population of 938.
