= Al-Yaarubiyah Subdistrict =

Al-Yaarubiyah Subdistrict ناحية اليعربية
- Subdistrict
- Location of Al-Jawadiyah Subdistrict within al-Hasakah Governorate

- Location in Syria
- Coordinates (Al-Yaarubiyah): 36°49′21″N 41°53′50″E
- Country: Syria
- Governorate: al-Hasakah
- District: Jawadiyah
- Seat: Al-Yaarubiyah

Population (2004)
  - Total: 39,459
- Geocode: SY080302

Al-Yaarubiyah Subdistrict (Arabic: ناحية اليعربية) is a subdistrict of Al-Malikiyah District in northeastern al-Hasakah Governorate, northeastern Syria. The administrative centre for the subdistrict is the town of Al-Yaarubiyah.

At the 2004 census, the subdistrict had a population of 39,459.

== Cities, towns and villages ==
- Tal al-Arab Gharbi
