= 2017 Rojava local elections =

Elections in Syria

2017 Northern Syria Local Elections
← 2015	September 22, 2017	2024 →
- Turnout: 70%
- Regions of the DFNS where elections took place in red

The first local elections in the Democratic Federation of Northern Syria were held on 22 September 2017. Representatives of 3,700 communes in the regions of the Northern Syria Federation were selected in the election, involving 12,421 candidates. The communal elections on 22 September were followed by elections of local councils in December and a federal parliamentary election of the People's Democratic Council, the region's highest governing body, in 2018. Some areas controlled by the Syrian Democratic Forces were not included in the election, including the city of Manbij.

== Preparations ==
Between 27 and 28 July 2017, a conference of the Syrian Democratic Council was held in the town of Rmelan. During the conference, the three-canton system in Rojava was changed to three federal regions, the Jazira, the Euphrates, and Afrin Regions. Dates of elections were also decided at the meeting, with 22 September being the date for communal elections, 3 November for municipal elections, and 19 January 2018 for the People's Assembly of Federal Regions and the People's Democratic Council, the highest governing body for the Federation of Northern Syria. Officials who organized the elections included Hediya Yousef and Îlham Ehmed, two senior officials in the government of the de facto federal region.

The election was mostly organized by the High Electoral Commission (Arabic: المفوضية العليا للانتخابات; Kurdish: Komseriya Bilind Ya Hilbijartinan; Classical Syriac: ܦܩܝܕܳܝܘܬ݂ܐ ܥܠܝܬܐ ܕܓܘܒܳܝ̈ܐ) of the Democratic Federation of Northern Syria which launched a promotional campaign in order to encourage voting in the election which included online promotional advertisement on Facebook and Twitter and the release of a promotional song in Kurdish, Arabic and Syriac.

al-Ghamar Arabs (lit. 'Arabs of the Flood'), who were settled by the Syrian regime in the Hasakah Governorate in the 1960s and '70s on appropriated (mostly Kurdish-owned) land, were allowed to participate in the communal elections and subsequent regional elections to establish local services for them, but weren't allowed to participate in the third round in January 2018 to elect the Syrian Democratic Council. The cities of Manbij and Raqqa were excluded, as they had local councils independent from the Northern Syria Federation, and Raqqa was only fully captured by the Syrian Democratic Forces after the first local elections. Both men and women ran in the elections, with the SDC planning to have women hold 50% of positions.

== Elections ==
The elections officially began at 8 a.m. on 22 September, with hundreds of thousands of people participating.

Security during the elections was maintained by the Asayish police, the Anti-Terror Forces (HAT) and the Society Protection Forces (HPC). In cities and towns with Assyrian populations, such as Qamishli, the Sutoro police also provided security.

The elections in the Jazeera and Euphrates regions ended on 8 p.m. that day, while elections in the Afrin Region were extended by two hours.

== Results ==
728,450 votes representing 70% of eligible voters were reported to have been cast in total, with 437,142 from the Jazira Region, 135,611 from the Euphrates Region and 155,697 from the Afrin Region.

== Recognition, support, and opposition ==
On 6 August 2017, Faisal Mekdad, the deputy foreign minister of Syria, dismissed the elections as a "joke".

The Raqqa Civil Council and leaders of 5 tribes in and around Raqqa announced their support for the elections.

On 20 September, the Kurdish National Council in Syria announced a boycott of the election and called it a "flagrant violation of the will of the Kurdish people".

== See also ==
- 2017 Northern Syria regional elections
- List of political parties in Rojava
- Politics of Syria
