= Terrier Plan =

Project promoting Kurdish immigration from Turkey

The Terrier Plan was a demographic, political and cultural engineering project promoting Kurdish immigration from Turkey and settlement in northeastern Syria by the French Mandate authorities within their larger "divide and rule" policy.

== Origins and Scope ==
The plan emerged around 1926 and was the brainchild of Lieutenant Pierre Terrier, a French officer operating in Qamishli, Al-Jazira Province, in northeastern Syria. It manifested as an unofficial, locally enacted strategy rather than a formal, wide-reaching policy from the High Commissioner's office. The French rationale was twofold: to secure loyalty among non-Arab refugee groups opposed to the Turkish Republic, and to establish a "friendly" demographic buffer in a contested frontier region. The plan reflected the broader French strategy of leveraging local ethnic and sectarian differences to weaken emerging Arab nationalist movements and facilitate indirect control. French officials often promoted minority empowerment as a counterbalance to unified Syrian identity. Terrier's plan was unique in its practical emphasis on Kurdish cultural promotion from the ground up.

== Formation of a Kurdish belt ==
Pierre Terrier drafted a program of settlement to repopulate the frontier zone and consolidate French control. The strategy placed Kurdish and Assyrian refugees in organized villages along the northern border, particularly between Derik (al-Malikiyah) and Ras al-Ayn.

Because the majority of the refugees were Kurdish, the effect of the Terrier Plan was to create a nearly continuous strip of Kurdish-majority settlements along the Syrian–Turkish border. This corridor stretched across much of present-day al-Hasakah Governorate.

By the mid-20th century, the Kurdish population in this belt had expanded further due to natural growth and continued migration, consolidating the demographic presence of Kurds in northeastern Syria.

== Key Initiatives of the Plan ==
Under Terrier's direction, the plan promoted both political and cultural initiatives:

- Political integration tactics
  - Appointment of Kurdish officials in the Jazira
  - Formation of a battalion composed of Kurds and Kurdish-speaking Christians
- Cultural and educational support
  - Introduction of a Kurdish language course at the Arab College of Damascus
  - Launch of Kurdish night classes in Beirut
  - Support for the publication of the Kurdish journal Hawar, which promoted Kurdish language, folklore, history, ethnography, and instruction
- Refugee and identity measures
  - Encouraging the Syrian government to issue identity cards to Kurdish refugees who had been living in the country for several years

== Consequences ==
In addition to the huge demographic shifts in the Jazira province, the plan extended Kurdish territorial contiguous presence into northeastern Syria. Another major consequence of the Terrier Plan was the military and political empowerment of Kurds to challenge the Turkish state. The French authorities tolerated the founding of the Kurdish nationalist political organization Xoybun in 1927, which was the main organization behind the Ararat Revolt in Turkey in 1930.

Similarly, the French received Hajo Agha with his militant men and their arms and families as they fled Turkey in 1926. In 1930, Hajo Agha led raids across the border on the Turkish troops in southeastern Turkey in an attempt to support the ararat Revolt.

== Decline of the Mandate Kurdish Policy ==
Initially effective in cultivating Kurdish cultural expression, the Terrier Plan's influence began to wane after 1936, as broader Syrian nationalist aspirations grew stronger. The 1936 Franco-Syrian Treaty proposed Syrian independence and promised further integration of Syrian regions into a unified national government. This reduced the strategic usefulness of policies like the Terrier Plan. French intelligence officers continued, for a while, to nurture regionalist currents in the Jazira, but their influence gradually declined.

== See also ==
- Kurdish immigration into Syria
- Kurds in Syria
- Assyrians in Syria
- French Mandate for Syria and the Lebanon
