= Al-Malikiyah Subdistrict =

Al-Malikiyah Subdistrict ناحية مركز المالكية Nahiye Dêrika Hemko
- Subdistrict
- Location of Al-Malikiyah Subdistrict within al-Hasakah Governorate

- Location in Syria
- Country: Syria
- Governorate: al-Hasakah
- District: Al-Malikiyah District
- Seat: Al-Malikiyah

Area
  - Total: 1,264.22 km^{2} (488.12 sq mi)

Population (2004)
  - Total: 112,000
  - Density: 88.6/km^{2} (229/sq mi)
- Geocode: SY080300

Al-Malikiyah Subdistrict (Arabic: ناحية مركز المالكية; Kurdish: Nahiye Dêrika Hemko) is a subdistrict of the Al-Malikiyah District in the northeastern part of al-Hasakah Governorate, Syria. The administrative centre for the subdistrict is the town of Al-Malikiyah.

At the 2004 census, the subdistrict had a population of 112,000.
