= Jordi Tejel =

Historian of the modern Middle East

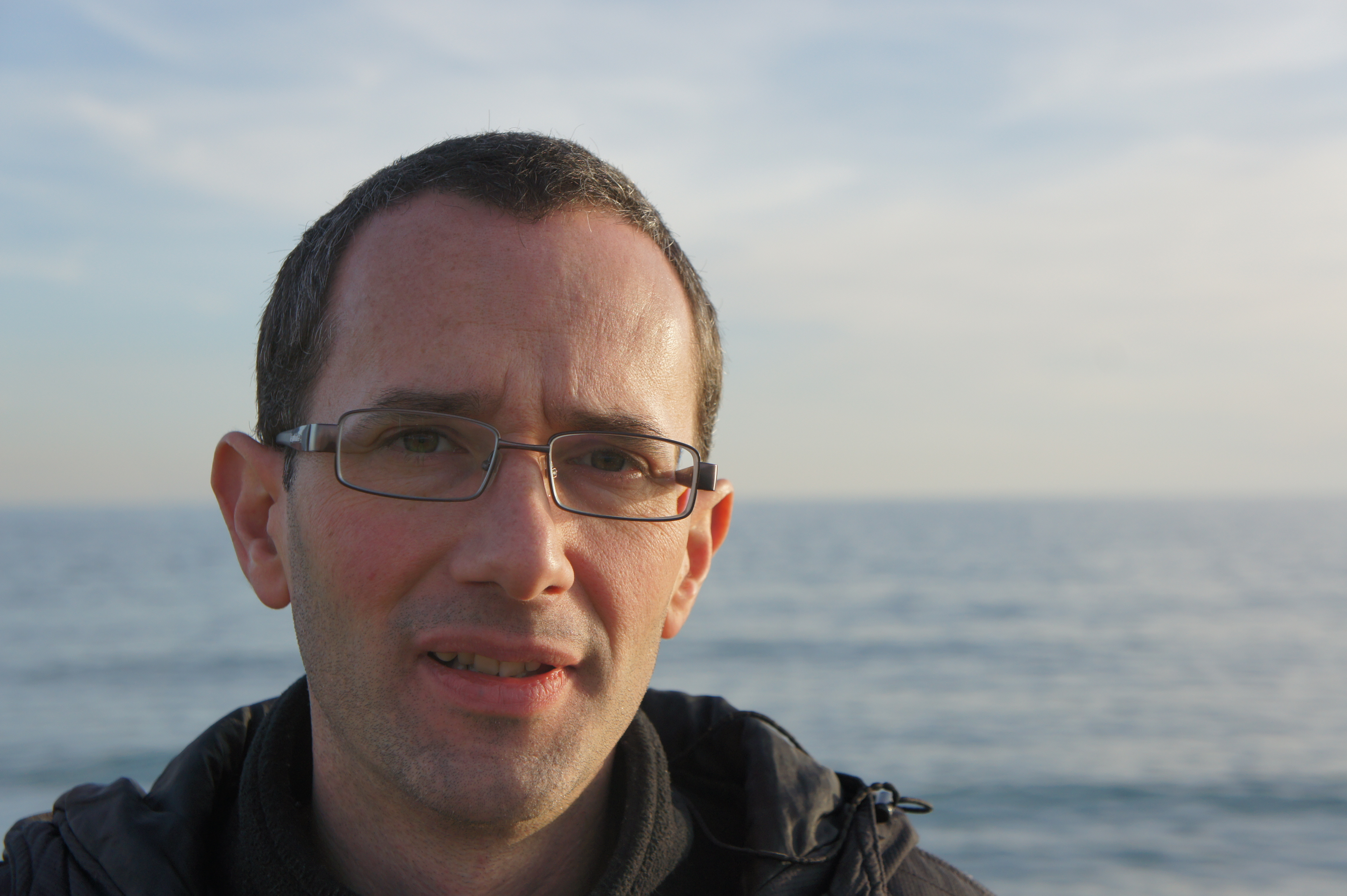
Jordi Tejel (2012)

Jordi Tejel Gorgas is a historian specializing in modern history, state/society relations, and state-building in the Middle East. He is often cited in the media in relation to Kurdish state-building and Syrian Kurds.

== Background ==
Tejel is a professor of contemporary history at the University of Neuchatel. He was a professor of international history at the Graduate Institute of International and Development Studies, in Geneva. He was previously a research fellow at the School of Oriental and African Studies and at the School for Advanced Studies in the Social Sciences in Paris. He's also been a lecturer at the University of Fribourg, the University of Neuchâtel and again in Fribourg. He holds a PhD from the School for Advanced Studies in the Social Sciences in Paris and from University of Fribourg.

== Work ==
His most recent books include Irak, chronique d’un chaos annoncé (Lavauzelle, 2006), Le mouvement kurde de Turquie en exil. Continuités et discontinuités du nationalisme kurde sous le mandat français en Syrie et au Liban (1925–1946) (Peter Lang, 2007), Syria’s Kurds. History, Politics and Society (Routledge, 2009), and Writing the History of Iraq: Historiographical and Political Challenges (edited with Peter Sluglett, Riccardo Bocco, and Hamit Bozarslan, World Scientific Press, 2012).
