= Al-Jawadiyah =

Al-Jawadiyah ٱلْجَوَادِيَّة
- Town
- Location within Syria
- Coordinates: 36°59′14″N 41°49′13″E
- Country: Syria
- Governorate: al-Hasakah
- District: al-Malikiyah
- Subdistrict: al-Jawadiyah
- Control: Autonomous Administration of North and East Syria

Population (2004)
  - Total: 6,630
- Time zone: UTC+3 (AST)

Al-Jawadiyah (Arabic: ٱلْجَوَادِيَّة, romanized: al-Jawādīyah, Kurdish: Çilaxa) is a town in al-Hasakah Governorate, Syria. According to the Syria Central Bureau of Statistics (CBS), Al-Jawadiyah had a population of 6,630 in the 2004 census. It is the administrative center of a nahiyah ("subdistrict") consisting of 50 localities, with a combined population of 40,535 in 2004.

== Demographics ==
In 2004 the population of the town was 6,630. Kurds and Arabs constitute roughly equal parts of the population.
