= Al-Malikiyah District =

al-Malikiyah District منطقة المالكية Navçeya Dêrika Hemko
- District
- Location of al-Malikiyah District within al-Hasakah Governorate

- Location in Syria
- Coordinates (al-Malikiyah): 37.17°N 42.13°E
- Country: Syria
- Governorate: al-Hasakah
- Seat: al-Malikiyah
- Subdistricts: 3 nawāḥī

Area
  - Total: 2,652.74 km^{2} (1,024.23 sq mi)

Population (2004)
  - Total: 191,994
  - Density: 72.3757/km^{2} (187.452/sq mi)
- Geocode: SY0803

al-Malikiyah District (Arabic: منطقة المالكية, romanized: manṭiqat al-Mālikiyah, Kurdish: Navçeya Dêrika Hemko) is a district of al-Hasakah Governorate in eastern Syria. The administrative centre is the city of al-Malikiyah.

al-Malikiyah is both the northernmost and easternmost district in Syria. At the 2004 census, it had a population of 191,994.

== Subdistricts ==
The district of al-Malikiyah is divided into three subdistricts or nawāḥī (population as of 2004):

Subdistricts of al-Malikiyah District
| PCode | Name | Area | Population | Villages | Seat |
|---|---|---|---|---|---|
| SY080300 | al-Malikiyah Subdistrict | 1,264.22 km^{2} | 112,000 | 108 | al-Malikiyah |
| SY080301 | al-Jawadiyah Subdistrict | 383.44 km^{2} | 40,535 | 50 | al-Jawadiyah |
| SY080302 | al-Yaarubiyah Subdistrict | 1,005.08 km^{2} | 39,459 | 62 | al-Yaarubiyah |
