= Al-Malikiyah =

Al-Malikiyah المالكية Dêrika Hemko
- City
- Derik
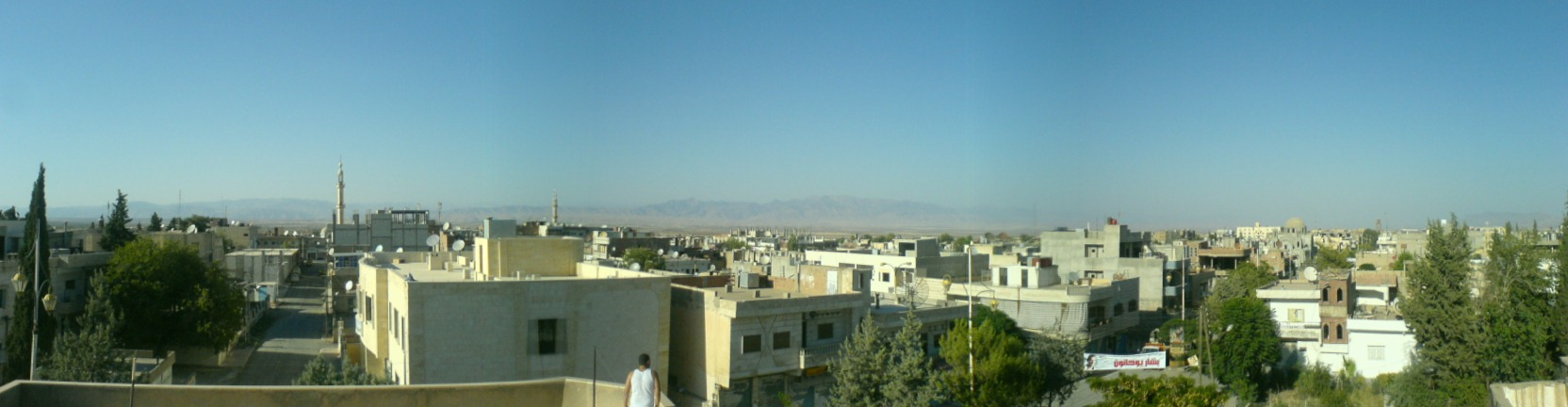
- Al-Malikiyah from the southwest

- Location in Syria
- Coordinates: 37°10′N 42°08′E
- Country: Syria
- Governorate: al-Hasakah
- District: al-Malikiyah
- Subdistrict: al-Malikiyah
- Elevation: 500 m (1,600 ft)

Population (2004)
  - Total: 26,311
- Time zone: UTC+3 (AST)
- Area code: 052

Al-Malikiyah (Arabic: ٱلْمَالِكِيَّة, romanized: al-Mālikīyah; Kurmanji Kurdish: Dêrika Hemko; Syriac: ܕܪܝܟ), also known as Derik, is a city in northeastern Syria and the center of an administrative district belonging to Al-Hasakah Governorate. The district constitutes the northeastern corner of the country, and is where the Syrian Democratic Council convenes. The town is about 20 km (12 mi) west of the Tigris river which defines the triple border between Syria, Turkey and Iraq. According to the Syria Central Bureau of Statistics (CBS), Al-Malikiyah had a population about 26,311 residents in the 2004 census. Other sources claim that the city has a population of 39,000 as of 2024. It is the administrative center of a nahiyah ("subdistrict") consisting of 108 localities with a combined population of 125,000. The town is inhabited by Kurds, Assyrians, Arabs and Armenians.

== Etymology ==
There are two theories on the local Syriac and Kurdish name of the city. The first theory is that the city is named after an ancient monastery ('dayr' in Syriac) located in its vicinity, while the second one argues that the name "Dêrik" stems from the Kurdish word du rek meaning 'two roads'. In 1957, the town was named "Al-Malikiyah", after a Syrian army officer Adnan al-Malki. In 1977, a decree was issued to ban all non-Arabic place names. Therefore the Kurdish and Syriac-Aramaic names were banned from being used.

== History ==
The city is located in the middle of Hesinyan plain between the Tigris and Safan rivers. The region was controlled by the Kurdish Bohtan principality until 1848 and inhabited mostly by the Kurdish Hesinyan tribe, giving the plain its name. Before attaining the size of a city, Derik village was given by the prince Bedirkhan Botani to Hemko Hesinî, who was a military leader for Botan principality in its last years, hence the city has its alternative name: Dêrika Hemko.

After World War I, the French enlisted help from the Kurdish Milli tribe to control the whole region east of Euphrates river up to the Tigris. The French chose the village of Ayn Dywar as the center for the region, but in 1927 they moved the administrative center to Derik. And since then the village developed into a city .

As of 2004, Al-Malikiyah is the fifth largest city in Al-Hasakah governorate.

=== Syrian Civil War ===
As a result of the ongoing civil war, Al-Malikiyah is currently controlled by the Autonomous Administration of North and East Syria (AANES). On 21 July 2012, the ethnic Kurdish People's Defense Units (YPG) reportedly captured Al-Malikiyah, which is located just 10 kilometers from the Turkish border, although another report stated that fighting was still going on in the city. On 22 July, it was reported that YPG forces were still fighting for Al-Malikiyah, and one young Kurdish activist was killed after Pro-Assad government forces allegedly opened fire on protesters. In November 2012, government forces withdrew from the city.

Kurdish-led authorities subsequently installed the "Dêrik prison" for captured Islamic State members in al-Malikiyah. In April 2019, the prison was the site of a major prison escape attempt by about 200 ISIL detainees, including several French jihadists. The breakout was foiled, however, and some prisoners were distributed to other detention centers.

In May 2020, reports emerged that Russia had begun building a new military base in Qeser Dib, a village outside of al-Malikiyah. In 2021, the United States Army constructed a Forward operating base 3.8 kilometers south of the city. The base is operated by United States Special Forces and a Combat Action Team, who routinely conduct patrols near the city in Bradley Fighting Vehicles.

On 2 February 2022, four civilians were killed after an armed Turkish drone bombed a power station near the city.

== Demographics ==
Historical population
Year	Pop.	±%
1981	13,225	—
1994		—
2004	26,311	—

The population consists mostly of ethnic Kurds and Assyrians in addition to a small minority of Armenians. The northern half of the town is mainly inhabited by Muslim Kurds, and the southern part by Syriac Christians.

As of November 2014, 200 ethnic Armenians remain in the city out of a pre-civil war figure of 450.

== Notable people ==
- Jarjis Danho
- Hevrin Khalaf
- Faia Younan
- Sherwan Haji
- Bahoz Erdal

== Gallery ==
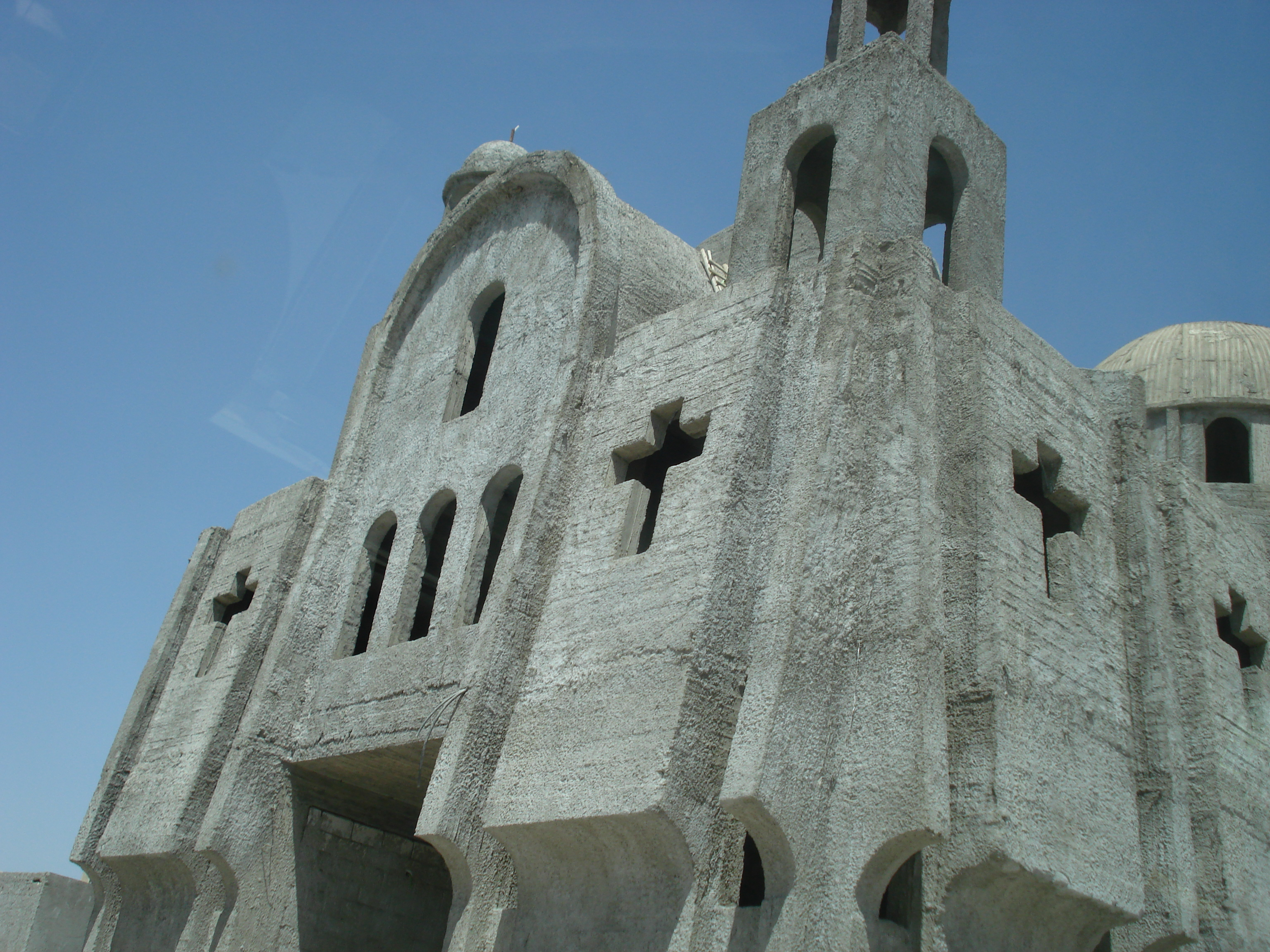
New Syriac Orthodox Church on Main street

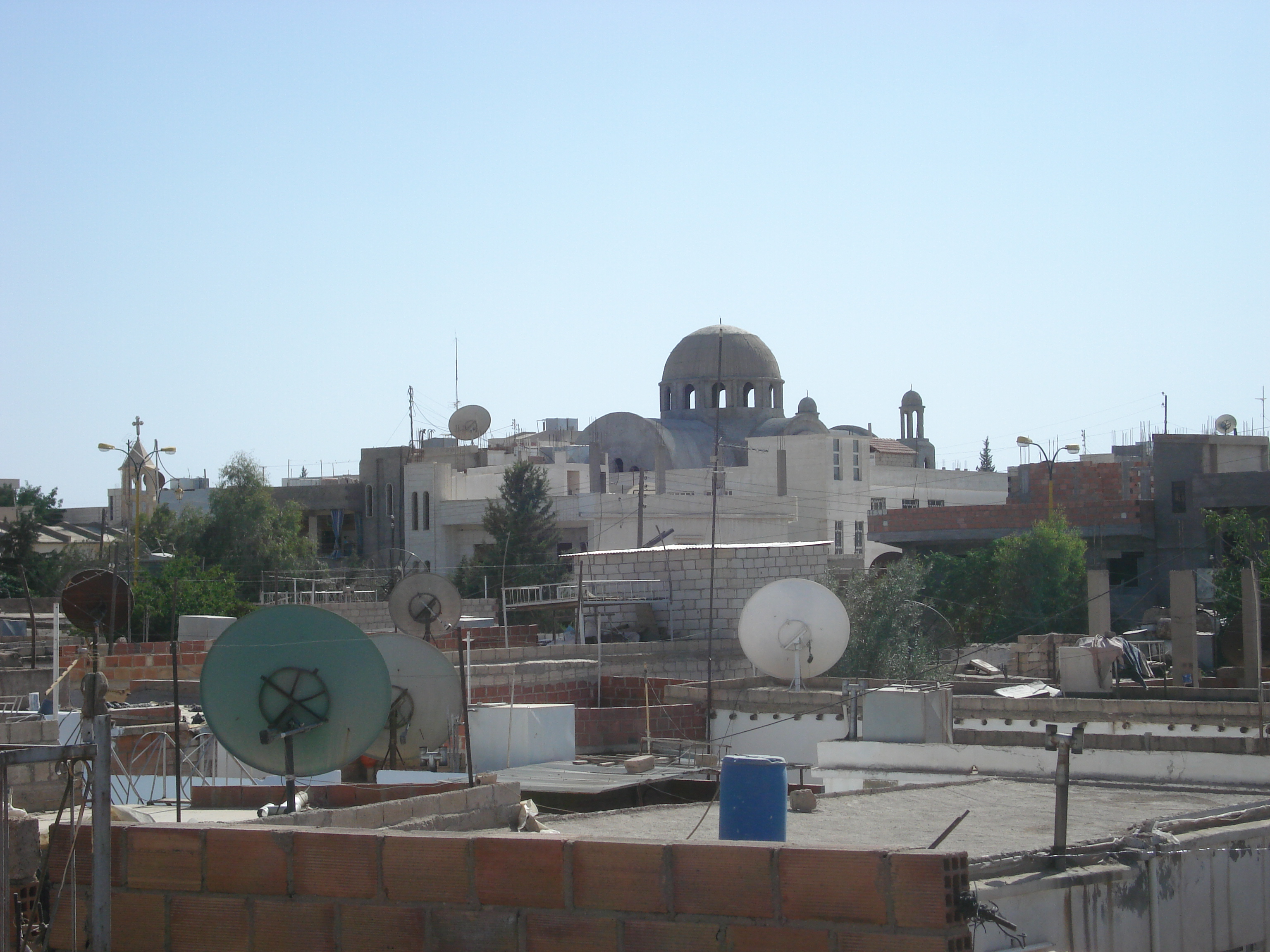
New Church dome

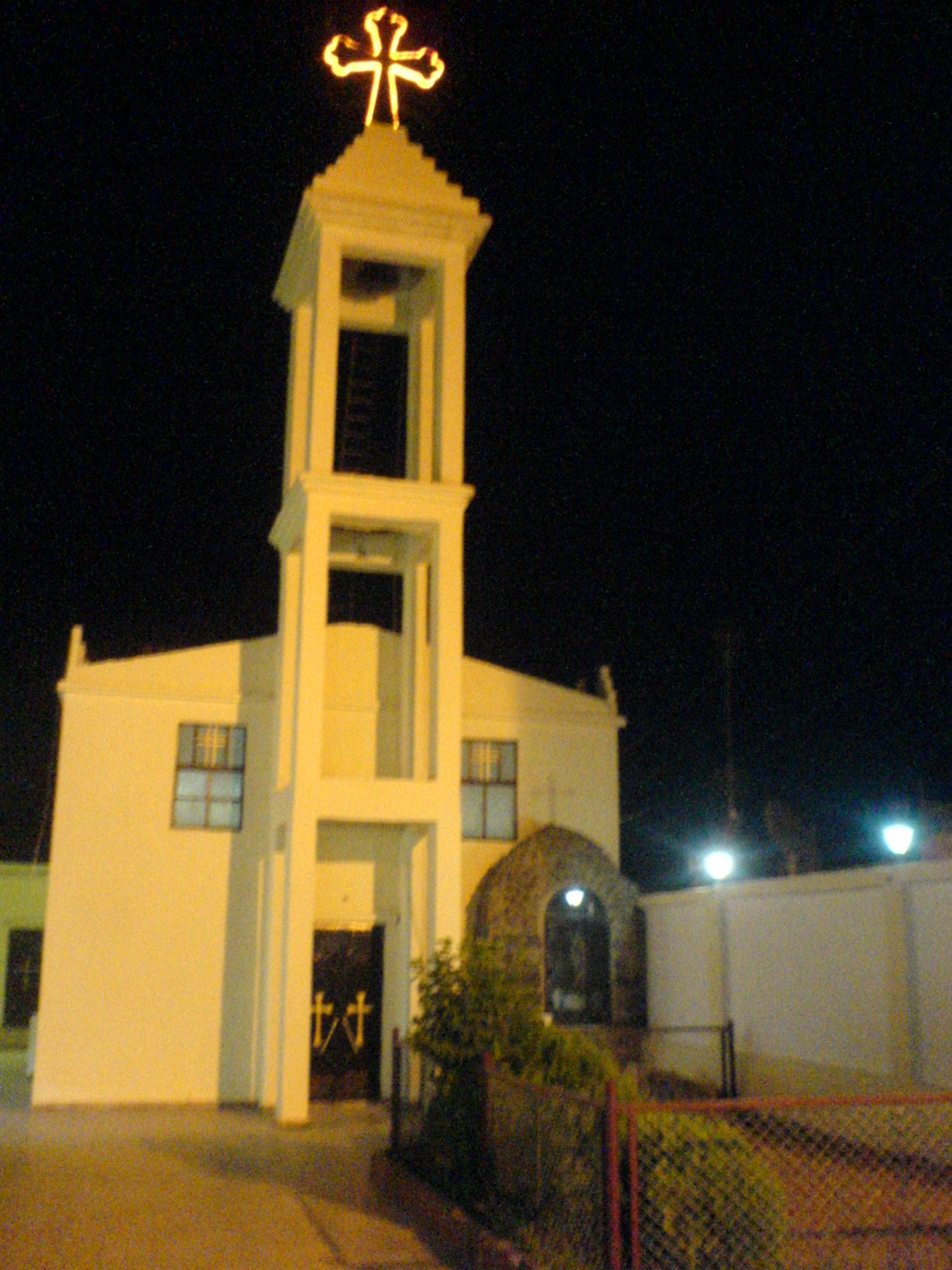
Chaldean Catholic Church

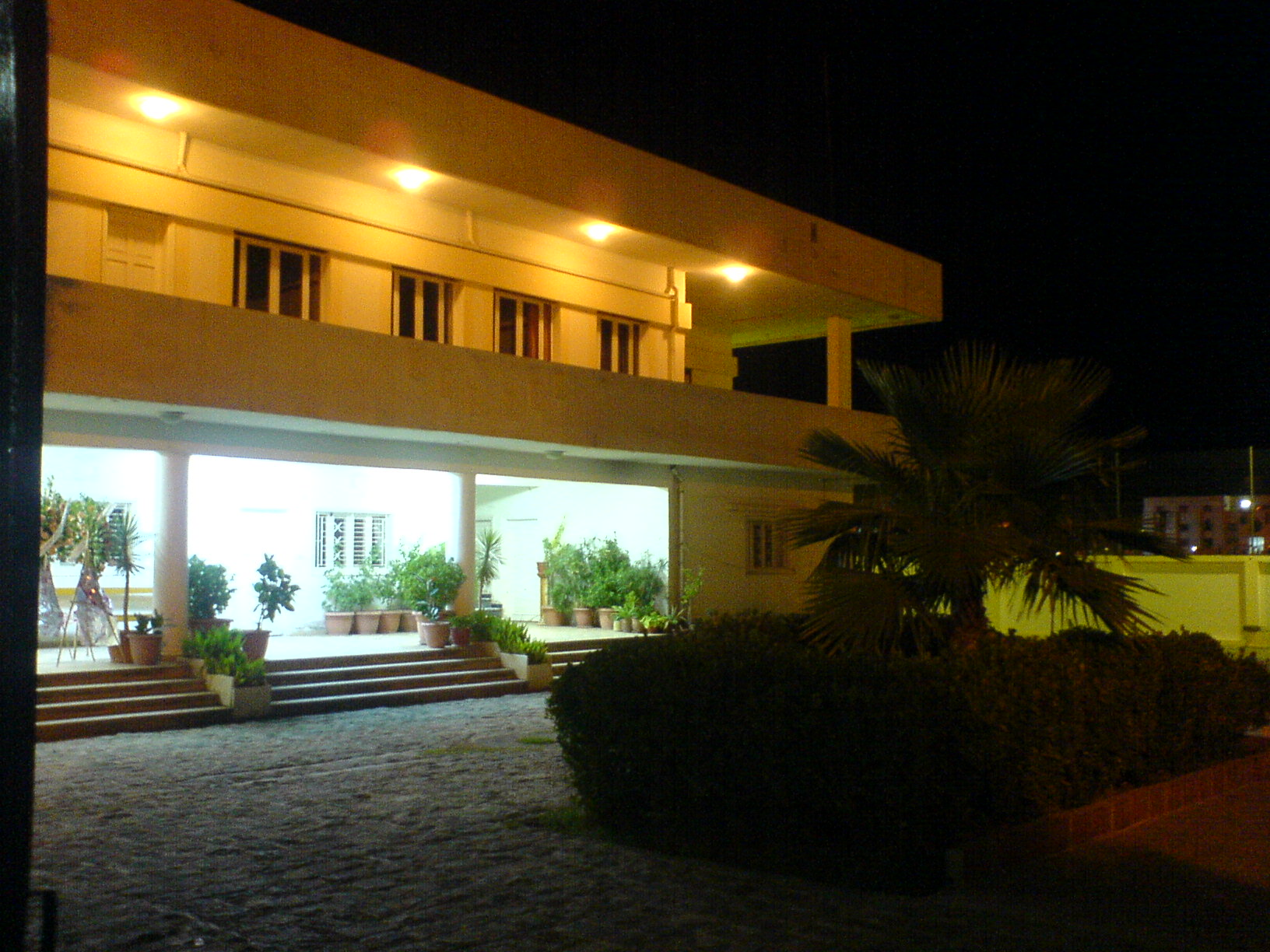
Chaldean Catholic Church and School Building

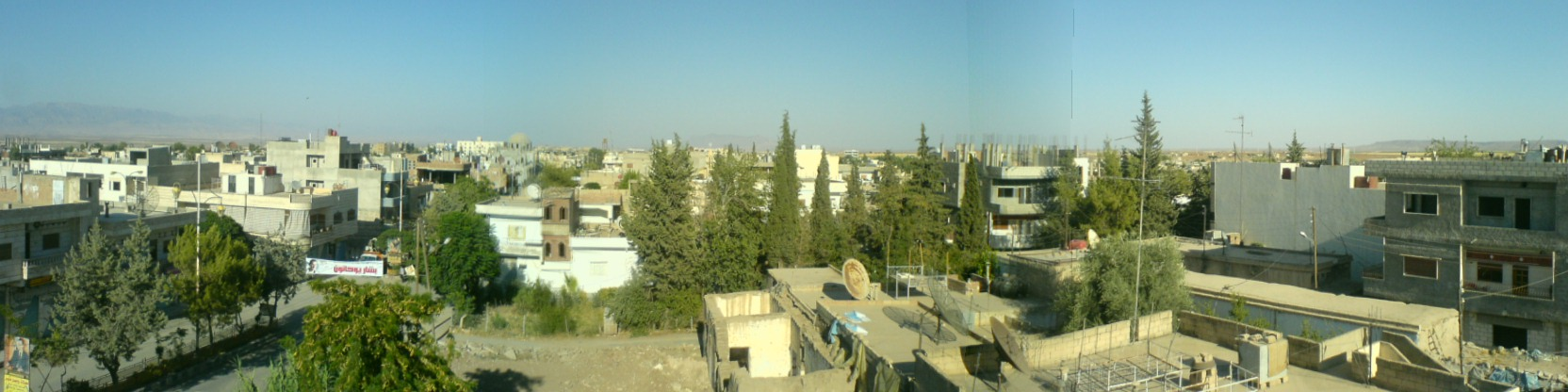
Looking east

== See also ==
- Syrian civil war
