= List of terrorist incidents in 2020 =

This is a list of terrorist incidents which took place in 2020, including attacks by violent non-state actors for political motives. Note that terrorism related to drug wars and cartel violence is not included in these lists. Ongoing military conflicts are listed separately.

== Guidelines ==
- To be included, entries must be notable (have a stand-alone article) and described by a consensus of reliable sources as "terrorism".
- List entries must comply with the guidelines outlined in the manual of style under MOS:TERRORIST.
- Casualties figures in this list are the total casualties of the incident including immediate casualties and later casualties (such as people who succumbed to their wounds long after the attacks occurred).
- Casualties listed are the victims. Perpetrator casualties are listed separately (e.g. x (+y) indicate that x victims and y perpetrators were killed/injured).
- Casualty totals may be underestimated or unavailable due to a lack of information. A figure with a plus (+) sign indicates that at least that many people have died (e.g. 10+ indicates that at least 10 people have died) – the actual toll could be considerably higher. A figure with a plus (+) sign may also indicate that over that number of people are victims.
- If casualty figures are 20 or more, they will be shown in **bold**. In addition, figures for casualties more than 50 will also be **underlined**.
- Incidents are limited to one per location per day. If multiple attacks occur in the same place on the same day, they will be merged into a single incident.
- In addition to the guidelines above, the table also includes the following categories:

0 people were killed/injured by the incident.
1–19 people were killed/injured by the incident.
20–49 people were killed/injured by the incident.
50–99 people were killed/injured by the incident.
100+ people were killed/injured by the incident.

== List ==
Total incidents: 31

Date	Type	Dead	Injured	Location	Article	Details	Perpetrator	Part of
9 January	Mass shooting	89 (+77)	6	Filingue Department, Niger	Battle of Chinagodrar	Militants on motorbikes and in cars attacked a military outpost at Chinagodrar in the Tillabéri Region near the border with Mali. 77 militants were killed with the help of French airstrikes.	Islamic State in the Greater Sahara	Insurgency in the Maghreb
10 January	Suicide bombing	15 (+1)	19	Quetta, Pakistan	January 2020 Quetta bombing	Suicide bombing in a Taliban-run mosque.	Islamic State – Khorasan Province	Insurgency in Balochistan; Islamic State–Taliban conflict
18 January	Suicide car bombing	4 (+1)	20	Afgooye, Somalia	2020 Afgooye bombing	A suicide car bomber targeted a place where Turkish engineers and Somali police were having lunch in Lower Shabelle.Most of the casualties were police officers.	Al-Shabaab	Somali Civil War
2 February	Stabbing	0 (+1)	2	London, United Kingdom	2020 Streatham stabbing	A man who had recently been released from prison stabbed two people in public, before being shot and killed by police. Europol classified the attack as jihadist terrorism.	Sudesh Mamoor Faraz Amman	Islamic terrorism in Europe
19 February	Shootings	10 (+1)	5	Hanau, Germany	Hanau shootings	Shootings in two shisha bars, one at the Midnight bar in the central square and the other at the Arena Bar & Café in the western Kesselstadt neighborhood. Four people were killed in the first shooting, while five were killed in the second. He killed his mother in their apartment and then committed suicide. The police initiated a large-scale investigation together with the CID. The attacker, a 43-year-old man, expressed far-right views and hate for non-German people in a letter of confession and a video. Six of the people killed in the shisha bars shootings were foreigners, while three were German citizens with foreign origins.	Tobias Rathjen	Right-wing terrorism in Germany
24 February	Stabbing	1	2	Toronto, Canada	2020 Toronto machete attack	A woman was stabbed to death and two other people were wounded in a stabbing attack at a massage parlor in the North York area. A 17-year-old boy was arrested.	Oguzhan Sert	Terrorism in Canada
6 March	Mass shooting, missile attack	32 (+2)	82	Kabul, Afghanistan	6 March 2020 Kabul shooting	Gunmen attacked a ceremony commemorating the Hazara leader Abdul Ali Mazari attended by several high-profile politicians. Both attackers were killed after a standoff.	Islamic State – Khorasan Province	War in Afghanistan
25 March	Suicide bombings, mass shooting, hostage taking	25 (+3)	9	Kabul, Afghanistan	Kabul gurdwara attack	Multiple gunmen and suicide bombers opened fire on a gurdwara.	Islamic State – Khorasan Province	War in Afghanistan
4 April	Mass stabbing	2	5	Romans-sur-Isère, France	2020 Romans-sur-Isère knife attack	A 33-year-old man stabbed 7 people before being arrested by police. Europol classified the attack as jihadist terrorism.	Abdallah Ahmed-Osman	Islamic terrorism in Europe
28 April	Grenade attack	53	50+	Afrin, Syria	2020 Afrin bombing	A grenade caused a fuel tanker to explode near a market and a government ministry.	YPG (suspected)	SDF insurgency in Northern Aleppo
May 20	Livestreamed shooting	0	3	Glendale, Arizona	2020 Westgate Entertainment District shooting	A misogynist terrorist attack targeting couples took place at the Westgate Entertainment District, a mixed-use development in Glendale, Arizona. Armando Hernandez Jr., livestreamed himself shooting and injuring three people at the Westgate Entertainment District. He then surrendered to responding police officers.	Armando Hernandez Jr.	Terrorism in the United States
20 June	Mass stabbing	3	3	Reading, United Kingdom	2020 Reading stabbings	25-year-old Libyan born Khairi Saadallah attacked two groups of people socialising in Forbury Gardens with a knife while shouting "unintelligible words" before being arrested nearly 30 minutes later. the judge said it was a terrorist attack.	Khairi Saadallah	Islamic terrorism in Europe
29 June	Grenade attack, shooting	4 (+4)	7	Karachi, Pakistan	Pakistan Stock Exchange attack	Militants with grenades and automatic rifles attacked the Pakistan Stock Exchange building. All four attackers were killed by the police.	Balochistan Liberation Army	Insurgency in Balochistan
21 July	Hostage taking, shooting	0	0	Lutsk, Ukraine	Lutsk hostage crisis	A man armed with firearms and explosives kept 13 people hostage in a bus in the city centre. After President Volodymyr Zelenskyy posted a short video on his Facebook page referencing the film Earthlings, all hostages were released unharmed. The gunman was arrested.	Maksym Kryvosh	Terrorism in Ukraine
2 and 3 August	Suicide car bombing, mass shooting, prison escape	21+ (+8)	50+	Jalalabad, Afghanistan	Jalalabad prison attack	Militants attacked a prison holding mostly Islamic State or Taliban members. Around 300 prisoners escaped.	Islamic State – Khorasan Province	War in Afghanistan
24 August	Motorcycle bombing, suicide bombing	14 (+1)	78	Jolo, Philippines	2020 Jolo bombings	A motorcycle bomb exploded next to a military truck outside the Paradise Food Plaza. Six soldiers, six civilians and a police officer were killed. One hour later a female suicide bomber blew herself up in front of a branch of the Development Bank of the Philippines, killing herself and a soldier who stopped her. A total of 78 people were wounded after the bombings.	Islamic State – East Asia Province	Moro conflict
25 September	Stabbing	0	2	Paris, France	2020 Paris stabbing attack	A 25-year-old man stabbed two people outside the former headquarters of the satirical magazine Charlie Hebdo, which is now used by a television production company that employed the two wounded victims. Europol classified the attack as jihadist terrorism.	Zaheer Hassan Mehmood	Islamic terrorism in Europe
4 October	Stabbing	1	1	Dresden, Germany	2020 Dresden knife attack	A 20-year-old man stabbed two people, killing one of them. The attacker was later arrested. Europol classified the attack as jihadist terrorism.	Abdullah al-H. H.	Islamic terrorism in Europe
12 October	Shooting	0 (+1)	1	Zagreb, Croatia	2020 Zagreb shooting	A 22-year old individual opened fire at the Banski dvori (seat of the Croatian government) and injured a police officer, before committing suicide.	Danijel Bezuk	Right-wing terrorism in Croatia
16 October	Stabbing, decapitation	1 (+1)	0	Éragny-sur-Oise, France	Murder of Samuel Paty	An 18-year-old man beheaded a teacher near a school in a suburb of Paris before being shot dead by police. The victim is said to have shown controversial cartoons of Muhammad to his students. Europol classified the attack as jihadist terrorism.	Abdoullakh Anzorov	Islamic terrorism in Europe
26 October	Suicide bombing	0 (+2)	3	İskenderun, Turkey	2020 İskenderun bombing	Two people who ambushed Turkish security forces in Payas escaped to İskenderun, where they ambushed police forces again. One of them was shot dead by police and the other one detonated the bombs, injuring a police officer and 2 civilians and killing the perpetrator.	Kurdistan Workers' Party	Kurdish–Turkish conflict
27 October	Bombing	8	136	Peshawar, Pakistan	2020 Peshawar school bombing	Explosion during a class at a religious school.	Islamists (suspected)	Insurgency in Khyber Pakhtunkhwa
29 October	Stabbing	3	0 (+1)	Nice, France	2020 Nice stabbing	A 21-year-old man stabbed four people at Notre-Dame de Nice, killing three, before being shot by police and taken into custody. Europol classified the attack as jihadist terrorism.	Brahim Aouissaoui	Islamic terrorism in Europe
2 November	Shooting	32 (+3)	50	Kabul, Afghanistan	2020 Kabul University attack	Militants opened fire inside Kabul University, killing 19 students and wounding 22 others. The gunmen came into crossfire with local security forces. Three of the terrorists were shot and killed.	Islamic State – Khorasan Province	War in Afghanistan
2 November	Mass shooting	4 (+1)	23	Vienna, Austria	2020 Vienna attack	A 20-year-old man shot people at random before being shot dead by police. Europol classified the attack as jihadist terrorism.	Kujtim Fejzulai	Islamic terrorism in Europe
28 November	Massacre, beheading	110	6	Jere, Nigeria	Koshebe massacre	Civilians, most of whom were peasant farmers, were killed as they worked in rice fields in Koshebe near Maiduguri. Crops worth millions of Naira were destroyed.	Boko Haram	Boko Haram insurgency
30 December	Bombing, mass shooting	25	110	Aden, Yemen	2020 Aden attacks	One or two explosions struck the airport in Aden as the government of Abdrabbuh Mansur Hadi was returning after agreeing to a power-sharing agreement earlier in the week with southern separatists. Prime Minister Maeen Abdulmalik Saeed was whisked away quickly to the security of the government palace following the attack. At least 25 people were killed, with three being medics from the Red Crescent, in the explosion and another 110 were injured, including 3 Red Crescent medics. It is unknown who is behind the blast(s) but Houthi rebels are suspected.	Houthis (suspected)	Yemeni Civil War
