= İskenderun attack =

İskenderun attack may refer to one of the following:

- 2010 İskenderun attack
- 2020 İskenderun shootout
