= Glory Corps =

Militant group in the Syrian Civil War

Glory Corps Faylaq al-Majd فيلق المجد
- Logo of the Glory Corps
- Leaders: Yaman Talju ("Abu al-Harith"); Maj. Yasser Abdul Rahim (since 2018); Sa’d Tayiba 3rd Brigade: Abu Bashir; Abu al-Yaman
- Dates active: 2017 – 2025
- Allegiance: Syrian Interim Government
- Group: 3rd Brigade (Nour al-Din al-Zenki Movement elements)
- Headquarters: Afrin, Syria
- Active regions: Northern Syria: Aleppo Governorate; Idlib Governorate; Hama Governorate; Latakia Governorate; Raqqa Governorate
- Ideology: Islamism
- Part of: Free Syrian Army; Syrian National Army
- Wars: Syrian Civil War

The Glory Corps (Arabic: فيلق المجد, romanized: Faylaq al-Majd) was a Turkish-backed Free Syrian Army faction that operated under the Syrian National Army's 3rd Legion during the Syrian Civil War. Formed in 2017, the group worked closely with the Levant Front, the main faction in the 3rd Legion, and included fighters that defected from the Sham Legion. The Glory Corps fought against Syrian government forces, and participated in the Turkish-led Operation Olive Branch against the People's Protection Units (YPG)-led Syrian Democratic Forces in the Afrin Region in 2018. It was targeted by a YPG insurgency in the aftermath of the offensive, when it became based in Afrin.

== History ==
The group announced its support for the Turkish-based Syrian Interim Government's initiative to form a "Syrian National Army" in the northern Aleppo Governorate August 2017. This "National Army" was announced on 30 December, with the Glory Corps as a member of its 3rd Legion. Its leader, Yaman Talju ("Abu al-Harith"), rejected any attempt to resolve the Syrian Civil War without the "overthrow of the regime and the trial of its criminals".

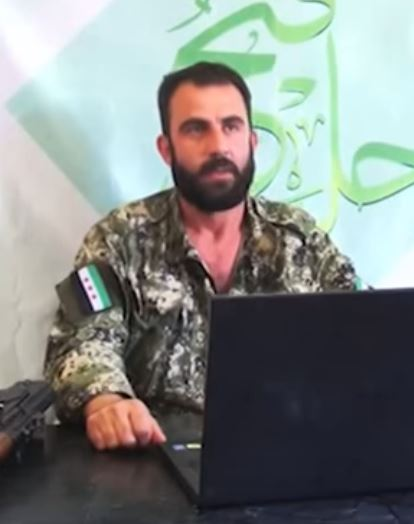
Ex-Fatah Halab and Sham Legion leader Yasser Abdul Rahim (pictured 2015) was the military commander of the Glory Corps

Along with the rest of the SNA and the Turkish Armed Forces, the Glory Corps launched an offensive against SDF-held Afrin in January 2018, capturing the region in March. During the operation, Major Yasser Abdul Rahim was dismissed as field commander of the Sham Legion; Yasser and a number of other fighters from the Sham Legion proceeded to join the Glory Corps, with him as field commander. Talju and other rebel commanders refused to attend a conference in Sochi in January, and returned to Turkey.

On 30 November 2018, the YPG ambushed a Glory Corps checkpoint in the Bulbul district and killed 2 fighters.

After the Nour al-Din al-Zenki Movement was defeated by Hayat Tahrir al-Sham in January 2019, its fighters fled to Afrin, where it declared its dissolution after meeting with Turkish officials on 25 March. The Zenki Movement's leadership were all removed, and between 300 and 2,000 fighters led by Abu Bashir and Abu al-Yaman renamed themselves the 3rd Brigade and joined the Glory Corps.

The Glory Corps fought in the northwestern Syria offensive since April 2019, during which its fighters killed a number of Syrian Army soldiers with a 9M113 Konkurs missile at the Jabal al-Akrad front on 3 July.

On 30 July 2019, Glory Corps commander Maj. Yasser Abdul Rahim announced from Afrin the Syrian opposition's intention to participate in the 13th round of talks between Turkey, Russia, and Iran in Nur-Sultan (Astana), the capital of Kazakhstan. As the military representative of the opposition delegation in Astana, Yasser vowed that the rebels in northwestern Syria will continue fighting, that the delegation will "prove to the world that Russia was a criminal", and that they will "tell the Russians and the Assad regime there that you are the murderers." The talks commenced on 1 August.

The Glory Corps participated in the 2019 Turkish offensive into north-eastern Syria against the SDF, which began on 9 October. Fighters of the group secured the defection of 3 purported SDF fighters they captured during the offensive. In early 2020, the group fought alongside other rebel factions and Turkish forces against the government's Dawn of Idlib 2 offensive.

On 4 July 2020, clashes took place between the Glory Corps and the Levant Front southwest of Tell Abyad.

=== Allegations concerning violations of war crimes ===
On 3 October 2018, the Glory Corps attempted to seize 4 houses inhabited by displaced families from Arbin in Afrin city to use as headquarters, but were stopped by the Sultan Murad Division and the Turkish-backed military police.

On 27 January 2019, Glory Corps and Sham Legion fighters kidnapped a doctor from his clinic in Afrin and tortured him, accusing him of being a member of the Democratic Union Party (PYD); the Sham Legion denied its fighters were involved.

After the SNA captured the border town of Tell Abyad and its surroundings during the offensive in northern and eastern Syria in October 2019, Glory Corps fighters reportedly kidnapped several young men from Bir Atwan village, west of Tell Abyad, and beat and humiliated them. On 22 October, fighters from the group trampled and mutilated the body of what appeared to be a Women's Protection Units (YPJ) fighter they killed in the countryside near Kobanî, laughing and chanting "Allahu Akbar" while they did so.
