= SDF insurgency in northern Syria =

Guerrilla attacks carried out by the SDF

- Part of the Syrian civil war and the aftermath of Operation Olive Branch
- Approximate frontline from the beginning of the insurgency (25 March 2018) until its supposed end (30 November 2024) Turkish occupation and Syrian National Army Syrian Democratic Forces and Kurdish insurgents Ba'athist Syria
Date	25 March 2018 – 30 November 2024 (6 years, 8 months and 5 days)
Location	(Turkey) Turkish occupation of Syria: Afrin District (former Afrin region); Azaz District; Al-Bab District; Jarabulus District; Manbij District; Idlib Governorate (occasionally); Spillovers in other districts
Status	Insurgency interrupted during the Northwestern Syria offensive under Operation Dawn of Freedom
Territorial changes	SNA takes control of the Shahba Canton

Belligerents
Democratic Autonomous Administration of North and East Syria; Kurdish insurgents Supported by: Ba'athist Syria (claimed by Turkey); Kurdistan Workers' Party (PKK) (claimed by Turkey)	Turkey; Syrian Interim Government (SIG)

Units involved
Syrian Democratic Forces; People's Protection Units (YPG); Women's Protection Units (YPJ); Military Councils; Al-Bab Military Council; Manbij Military Council; Kurdish insurgents; Afrin Liberation Forces (HRE); Wrath of Olives; Afrin Falcons; Revenge Hawks; Martyr Avesta Resistance Group; Kurdish Front; TİKKO	Turkish Armed Forces; Turkish Land Forces; Turkish Air Force; Syrian National Army; 1st Legion; Ahrar al-Sharqiya; 2nd Legion; Hamza Division; Sultan Murad Bloc; Sultan Murad Division; Jaysh al-Islam; 3rd Legion; Levant Front; Al-Rahman Legion; Glory Corps; National Front for Liberation; Ahrar al-Sham; Suqour al-Sham

Casualties and losses
Per SOHR: 86 killed Per SDF: 65 killed Per Turkey: 771 killed or captured	Per SOHR: (Syrian opposition) 175 killed (Turkey) 18 killed Per SDF: (Syrian opposition) (Turkey) 971 killed Per Turkey: (Syrian opposition) 16 killed (first days only); 12 killed

The SDF insurgency in northern Syria also known as Afrin insurgency was an armed campaign conducted by the Syrian Democratic Forces (SDF) and SDF-aligned Kurdish insurgent groups, most prominent of which are the Afrin Liberation Forces (HRE), in response to the expansion of Turkish military occupation in the Afrin Region. The insurgency began immediately after the end of Operation Olive Branch in March 2018, which was carried out by the Turkish Armed Forces (TAF) and the Syrian National Army (SNA).

The insurgency sought to expel Turkish forces and their allied factions from rural as well as urban areas captured during the invasion of Afrin. The city itself, the Sherawa region, a rocky extension of Aleppo's Mount Simeon District, and Afrin's isolated, forested central highlands were hotbeds for insurgent activity. However the insurgency also extended deeper into Turkish and Syrian Interim Government (SIG) controlled territories captured during Operation Euphrates Shield such as Al-Bab, Azaz, Jarabulus as well as other areas of the Aleppo Governorate. Occasionally actions of speculative veracity were conducted in the Idlib Governorate. A key staging ground for insurgent activities was Tell Rifaat (Shahba Canton), which remained under SDF control after the fall of Afrin. The insurgency was characterized by guerrilla warfare tactics, including hit-and-run assaults, anti-tank guided missile (ATGM) strikes, roadside improvised explosive devices (IEDs), targeted assassinations and summary executions, bombings, and sabotage operations against Turkish personnel, SNA fighters, alleged collaborators, and infrastructure associated with the occupation.

As civilian casualties increased, assassinations and bombings also increasingly adopted an ethno-nationalist framing. In statements accompanying various attacks, some insurgent groups and pro-Kurdish media outlets described the targets as "settlers", "thieves" and "mercenaries" terms they used to describe Syrian Arab and Palestinian internally displaced persons (IDPs) and refugees, as well as pro-Turkish fighters and their families who had been resettled in the formerly Kurdish-majority region of Afrin, which political scientist and cultural anthropologist T. Schmidinger also described as "Rojava's heartland" and "much more Kurdish than any other part of Rojava" prior to the occupation. The settled groups were portrayed by the insurgents as part of an alleged demographic-engineering policy (Turkification) by the Turkish-backed administration, a policy that has been documented by independent watchdogs such as the Syrian Observatory for Human Rights (SOHR), while The Guardian had reported in June 2018 that the population balance in the city of Afrin had already been changed from predominantly Kurdish to majority Arab. Schmidinger argues that these and other reported abuses against Afrin's residents, including forced disappearances, killings, and widespread looting, have intensified Kurdish grievances and, in turn, strengthened the desire for retribution, ultimately helping to fuel the insurgency.

The SOHR stated in an April 2024 report that, since the beginning of Afrin's occupation and the subsequent insurgency, "attacks and explosions [have] occur[red] almost daily," although the perpetrator behind many of these incidents was often unclear until a group claimed responsibility. In the later stages of the conflict, some attacks were also attributed to infighting between Turkish-backed factions, activity by the Islamic State (ISIS), and other actors.

The insurgency came to a supposed halt during the broader 2024 Syrian opposition offensives and the SNA's Operation Dawn of Freedom which forced the SDF in Tell Rifaat and the Shabha Canton to retreat to Kurdish-held Sheikh Maqsoud neighborhood in Aleppo and to the remaining areas of the Autonomous Administration of North and East Syria (AANES).

== Background ==
Shortly after the defeat of the SDF's People's Protection Units (YPG) in the Afrin Region, the spokeswoman for the Kurdish Democratic Union Party (Syria) (PYD), had already announced that the SDF would fight Turkish and allied opposition forces using guerrilla tactics. The YPG also stated "We reiterate that these terrorists and their families are the main targets of our forces. Our forces will target all the elements in the Afrin Canton that are in contact or cooperation with the Turkish invasion state."

== 2018 ==
By May 2018, a full-scale insurgency had broken out in the Afrin District, as the YPG along with allied militants and an insurgent group called the Afrin Falcons, began carrying out bombings, ambushes and assassinations against the Turkish Army, SNA forces, and civilians sympathetic or affiliated with them.

By mid-2018, the insurgency was mostly focused on the rural areas and Afrin city's outskirts. The SOHR reported an escalation in insurgent activity involving landmines, IED detonations, and rocket attacks. According to the organisation, these attacks killed dozens of fighters from various factions as well as members of the Turkish armed forces, with the pace of incidents increasing at an alarming rate. In response the Turkish Air Force regularly targeted guerilla holdouts in the Afrin region, while the Turkish Army and allied militants conducted "sweeping operations" to uncover sleeper cell hideouts between May and July.

Pro-SDF guerrilla activity spread to include the Euphrates Shield region, in particular Azaz and al-Bab.

March

27 March - The Turkish government announced the death of two Turkish soldiers, while the SNA confirmed the deaths of 16 of their fighters, as a result of attacks by YPG sleeper cells, The National reported.

April

27 April - The SOHR reported that the Turkish military had established checkpoints across the region, where Kurdish residents have reportedly been detained for alleged affiliation with the YPG. Furthermore "military controlled zones" were set up, as well as headquarter buildings and barracks for Turkish military forces in Kafr Safra village, north of Jindires.

May

- 3 May - YPG forces carried out an attack against Turkish army units positioned at Mahmoodiyyah district in Afrin city center. At least one soldier was killed and two others injured according to the YPG.
- 4 May - The YPG claimed responsibility for the killing of the former leader of the "Free East Ghuta Police," Jamal al-Zaghoul, who had been tasked by Turkish authorities with police duties and the re-settling of ethnic Arabs displaced from Ghuta to the Kurdish-majority region of Afrin, when a land mine hit his vehicle, south of Afrin city. Following his death, the YPG stated that "anyone in cooperation with the invasion forces is our target," including the re-settled Arabs who were, according to the YPG "part of a project by Zaghoul in which they were recruited as mercenaries." Additionally the attack killed three fighters of the Sham Legion, Zaghoul's wife, and fully destroyed their vehicle.
- 5 May - The YPG claimed to have killed seven Ahrar al-Sharqiya militants and one Turkish soldier in two attacks in Afrin and Jinderes.
- 8 May - The YPG claimed responsibility for the attack against the military base of the Turkish-backed "23rd Brigade" on the road between Jinderes district and village of Hammam in Afrin region. According to the YPG, five "terrorists" were neutralized as a result.
- 12 May - Heavy clashes occurred between SNA and YPG in the vicinity of villages of Maidankah, Qurtqoolaq and Kafarromah in Afrin's Sherawa district. According to the YPG, at least seven "terrorists" were killed.
- 26–31 May - The YPG claimed to have killed dozens of Turkish-backed fighters and at least two Turkish soldiers in six ambushes and bomb attacks, The National reported.

=== Founding of the Wrath of Olives Operations Room ===
In the summer of 2018 the Wrath of Olives Operations Room was established, which in the following months conducted numerous ambushes, and kidnappings against pro-Turkish Forces leading to executions, while warning the remaining Kurds residing in Afrin to "not approach the headquarters and place[s] of the mercenaries, to save your lives." The YPG had denied affiliation with the group.

T. Schmidinger told Al-Monitor that the label Wrath of Olives has been interpreted as a reference to claims that Turkey appropriated Afrin's formerly lucrative olive harvest. During Afrin's occupation Turkish-aligned groups destroyed large numbers of olive trees, pressured farmers to sell their produce at very low prices, and removed or confiscated local olive-oil presses.

June

In the first week of June, Hasan Sindi, a senior Kurdish member of the Turkish-backed Afrin Council, stated that he had fled to Europe, claiming he was the target of an assassination plot following a series of attacks by the Wrath of Olives Operations Room.

- 9 June - The Wrath of Olives Operations Room conducted their first official action in the insurgency by assassinating Ahmed Mesto, a Syrian Kurd, also known as Abu Aslan al-Kurdi, leader of the Turkish-backed Levant Front. In a statement they announced that they had killed three local Kurds on charges of "treason, espionage, and working with Turkey" earlier.
- 27 June - An explosives-laden motorcycle and a suicide bomber attacked a Levant Front headquarters at Kawa Hadad Roundabout, while in another attack a car bomb detonated outside Dersim Hospital along Jindayris Road in Al Fillat neighborhood, Afrin. According to the SOHR the attack left 10 killed and about 30 injured; the Afrin Falcons claimed responsibility for all of the attacks. Kurdistan24 spoke of as many as 26 people killed and wounded in the two explosions.
- 30 June - The Wrath of Olives Operations Room released a video of an assassination of two Sham Legion members in Idlib city, stating that "mercenaries [...] in Idlib, Afrin, Azaz, Mare', al-Bab, Jarablus and al-Rai will be constantly targeted."

July

VBIED attack in Jarabulus, 7 July 2018.

- 3 July - An IED in Afrin's Al-Ashrafiyeh neighbourhood killed one while injuring several others, the SOHR reported.
- 5 July - A person was killed by an IED in Afrin city, the SOHR reported.
- 7 July - The YPG claimed responsibility for an attack on Turkish soldiers outside the city of Afrin. That same day, at least 10 people were severely wounded in a car bomb that struck Jarablus.
- 8 July - Several people were killed and injured by a motorcycle bomb that struck the city of al-Bab.

The following days Turkish warplanes and artillery struck alleged YPG positions on Afrin's outskirts, local media reported.

In July, a senior Turkish official stated that maintaining security in Afrin remained a priority in light of the near-daily attacks.

August

- 5 August - The Wrath of Olives Operations Room released a video in which its fighters executed an alleged collaborator, who was part of a Turkish-supported governance body. Since this video and until March 2019, at least fifteen other Wrath of Olives-linked executions had taken place.
- 9 August - According to pro-Syrian opposition SMART News Agency the National Front for Liberation (NFL) clashed with the YPG in Kafr Nabu and Ba'ai in the southern part of the Afrin district near the border with the Idlib Governorate. SMART News Agency claimed that four YPG fighters were killed and that several light weapons and explosives were captured by the NFL.
- 16 August - The Wrath of Olives Operations Room released a video of their ambush on a SNA patrol at night.
- 18 August - The Wrath of Olives Operations Room published a video claiming responsibility for the killing of several pro-Turkish fighters. The footage included a captured identification card taken from one of the slain individuals.
- 22 August - Three civilians were killed in an explosion on Rajo street in Afrin's city center, Kurdistan24 reported, while the SOHR only confirmed the death of one.
- 26 August - The YPG released a video showing the assassination of an al-Rahman Legion commander, Abu Muhammad Al-Shmali, in Bulbul.
- 29 August - A Kurdish insurgent group known as the Revenge Hawks claimed responsibility for an IED attack, stating that it targeted a van-type military vehicle transporting Turkish soldiers and affiliated fighters. The group said that the attack killed three Turkish soldiers and six Turkey-backed fighters, and severely injured 12 others.

September

- 6 September - In a video the YPG displayed the assassination of Abu Mohammad al-Shamali, a member of the Sham Legion, while utilising silencers.
- 20 September - The YPG released footage of an ambush against the Sultan Murad Division in which they claimed to have killed three of their fighters.

October

- 2 October - The Wrath of Olives conducted an ambush in the village of Berbane, resulting in the death of three Turkish-backed militants and the destruction of their vehicle, al-Masdar News reported.

November

- 26 November - The YPG released footage of an anti-tank guided missile (ATGM) strike targeting a SNA-operated truck near the town of Bassouta.
- 30 November - Special Forces of the YPG attacked positions of Turkish-backed factions in Ablah village near al-Bab. Through an infiltration, the attackers killed at least three faction members and seized their weapons before withdrawing, the SOHR reported.

In the month of November the YPG claimed to have conducted 41 actions, which included sabotage, assassinations, raids and ambushes, in which 25 "mercenaries" were killed, 20 "mercenaries" were injured, and 3 three military vehicles destroyed, while two more were damaged.

December

- 1 December - A YPG sleeper cell in Bulbul, Afrin countryside, attacked posts of a Turkish-backed group in Hayamili village. The incident led to clashes between the two sides, resulting in casualties among the Turkish-backed factions before the YPG group withdrew, the SOHR reported.
- 2 December - An explosion occurred in the town of Jindires in southern Afrin after a car bomb detonated at the headquarters of the Ahrar al-Sham movement, injuring at least seven members, with reports of fatalities, according to the SOHR.
- 3 December - Jaysh al-Islam claimed to have foiled an attempted YPG infiltration in northwestern Aleppo, in the town of Deir Mushmush. The SOHR reported, citing reliable sources, that two Turkish-backed fighters were killed or wounded during the clashes in Deir Mushmush. In a separate incident a battalion commander affiliated with the Islamic Front was killed along with another fighter, and two additional battalion members were injured when a missile struck their position in the Baslehya area of Afrin countryside. The SOHR attributed the missile attack to YPG sleeper cell activity.
- 5 December - Two explosions were reported in the Afrin countryside, according to the SOHR. The first was caused by an IED detonated near the headquarters of a Turkey-aligned Islamist faction, injuring several individuals. A second IED exploded in a vehicle on the Rajo–Afrin road, injuring several fighters from Turkish-backed factions, with reports indicating that at least two were killed.
- 8 December - A Sultan Murad Division commander named Abu al-Mot was assassinated in Afrin's Sherawa district by unknown gunmen. YPG claimed responsibility for the attack in a statement released on 11 December.
- 9 December - The SOHR reported an explosion in the Afrin countryside, caused by an IED detonating in a vehicle belonging to a security commander from a Turkey-aligned division. The blast injured members of the commander's family, including children and women, and reports indicated that a male relative traveling with them was killed.
- 12 December - Unidentified gunmen opened fire on three individuals in al-Bab city, killing at least two and seriously wounding the third, the SOHR reported.
- 13 December - Turkey's defense ministry claimed that one Turkish soldier was killed by members of the YPG in clashes near Tell Rifaat. This report coincided with the targeting of a vehicle in the town of Kimare on the same day by an YPG-claimed ATGM strike. On the same day at least four people were killed as a result of a bombing in Afrin city, including at least one Turkish-backed fighter, the SOHR reported.
- 14 December - Four members of a Turkish-backed group were killed and four others were injured as a result of an IED explosion in a vehicle in the countryside of Afrin, the SOHR reported.
- 15 December - The YPG released a statement in which they claimed to have killed four Sham Legion and two Sultan Murad Division "mercenaries" on 14 December.
- 16 December - A Wrath of Olives-linked car bomb targeted a patrol of the Levant Front near Afrin city's Cardamom market, killing some civilian bystanders in the process. The Wrath of Olives said in a statement that the bombing killed "at least 25 mercenaries and settlers." Local reports suggested nine killed and 13 wounded, while it was unclear what portion of the casualties were civilians or combatants.

=== Founding of the Afrin Liberation Forces (HRE) ===
- 21 December - The Afrin Liberation Forces (HRE), a pro-YPG insurgent group, was established and released a press statement laying out the group's goals; the group stated that they seek to end the "occupation of their areas" and that they would carry out operations as part of a "justified war" until the region is "liberated". The statement also claimed responsibility for two attacks: one on 18 December involving the detonation of an IED against Turkish soldiers, claiming as many as six men had been injured and killed, and another attack on the same date, the detonation of another IED on forces of the Hamza Division. On the same day, an IED planted in a car on al-Mazut Street in Afrin, near the headquarters of a Turkish-backed group, detonated and caused material damage, the SOHR reported.
- 24 December - An explosion occurred, caused by an IED detonated inside a trash bin in the city of Afrin, resulting in material damage, the SOHR reported.
- 29 December - The HRE released a video showing an IED attack targeting Turkish-backed militants and claimed that three individuals were killed, in Jindires' countryside.

The beginning of the HRE's campaign in December coincided with the final attack publicly claimed by the YPG.

From March to December 2018, the YPG itself claimed to have conducted nearly 140 attacks targeting Turkish and allied forces in the Afrin area. While a large number of these incidents were reported in zones adjacent to the SDF-held Shahba Canton the group also asserted that numerous operations took place well inside Afrin itself. From March 2018 to January 2019, Kurdish insurgents together with the YPG had claimed 23 attacks per month on average. Less than half of these had been documented or corroborated.

== 2019 ==
January

- 4 January - A brigade commander from the Olive Branch Operations Room and another member of the same brigade died from injuries sustained in a shooting by unidentified gunmen. The incident occurred at a checkpoint on the outskirts of Deir Ballut village in the northern Aleppo countryside, the SOHR reported.
- 5 January - The HRE released video footage of an anti-tank guided missile (ATGM) directly striking a vehicle. The HRE claimed to have killed two Turkish-backed militants in the attack.
- 12 January - Unidentified gunmen shot four fighters of the Turkish-backed Ahrar al-Sharqiya on the road to Al-Rai which killed all of them, the SOHR reported.
- 15 January - The HRE released video footage in which they claimed to have killed three SNA fighters in an IED attack in the Afrin Region. On the same day an explosion targeted a vehicle in Al-Mahmudiyyeh area in Afrin city, which caused material damage, the SOHR reported.
- 16 January - An explosion occurred in the south-western countryside of Afrin, which caused material damage, the SOHR reported.
- 19 January - The SOHR, reported of a landmine explosion in Afrin city, which killed an IDP from Ghouta and injured several others.
- 20 January - On the first anniversary of the occupation of Afrin a bus-bound IED explosion killed and injured dozens in Afrin city. A medical source and the SOHR reported that the attack resulted in three dead and 9 to 12 injured. On the same day, the HRE claimed to have attacked construction equipment belonging to Turkish forces used for building trenches and tunnels, stating that "jihadist fighters allied with the Turkish military had been killed during the attack."
- 23 January - Two bombings occurred outside the headquarters of Ahrar al-Sharqiya in the town of Rajo in the Afrin district. Initially no group claimed responsibility for the attack but later on the Wrath of Olives claimed responsibility. Three members of the Turkish-backed group were killed by the attack. Later that same day another Wrath of Olives-linked IED attack occurred in Afrin city.

Furthermore, in January, the SOHR documented multiple attacks by unidentified gunmen on Turkish-backed police checkpoints in northern Aleppo. One attack occurred on the road between al-Bab and Bizaah, where gunmen opened fire on a checkpoint, injuring three officers. In a separate overnight incident in Soran Azaz, attackers on a motorcycle targeted a Turkish-backed police checkpoint, killing three officers and wounding more than five others; one assailant was also killed.

Cumulatively, the YPG, Wrath of Olives and HRE have claimed responsibility for almost 220 attacks between late March 2018 and the end of January 2019 with half of these having occurred between July and September 2018.

February

- 17 February - The HRE claimed to have carried out three separate actions killing one Turkish soldier, while killing and injuring a number of affiliated militants.
- 21 February - A car bombing occurred near a hospital in Afrin city during a SNA military parade. Pro-YPG media outlets stated that casualties occurred as a result of the bombing. Syrians for Truth and Justice reported that the bombing resulted in the death of 35 people including civilians, while the Wrath of Olives claimed responsibility.
- 24 February - According to pro-Syrian opposition news channel Aleppo Today, a member of the Sultan Murad Division was killed by an IED while attempting to dismantle it.

March

The SOHR reported that by 21 March 2019, a total of 613 SNA fighters had been killed, including 447 by March 2018. This indicates that 166 SNA members were killed during this period of the Afrin insurgency, in which the HRE was described as a key belligerent.

On 1 March, Bellingcat reported that, based on its conservative estimates, several Turkish soldiers and at least 100 Turkish-backed fighters had been killed, and that dozens of vehicles had been damaged or destroyed during the insurgency. The outlet also suggested that casualties among Kurdish groups were likely "a little higher" than the YPG's reported figure of 16. Turkish-backed factions, meanwhile, stated that they had detained roughly ten pro-YPG insurgents.

- 7 March - The HRE claimed to have killed three members of the Turkish-backed Hamza Division in a "sabotage operation."
- 11 March - ANF News reported the establishment of the Martyr Avesta Resistance Group, an all-female insurgent organization based in Afrin. Video footage released by the outlet showed dozens of fighters participating in military drills. The group stated that it intended to "fight the occupiers of Afrin at the highest level."

April

- 2 April - In a statement the HRE claimed to have hit construction equipment of the Levant Front in Maree' district, alleging that a Turkish-backed "terrorist" named Mihemed Reşid was killed and one other wounded.
- 3 April - HRE fighters claimed to have targeted a position of a Turkish-backed group called Liwa 55 in Kelben village of Azaz. Three Liwa 55 members were supposedly wounded as a result of the attack, two of them critically.
- 8 April - Pro-Assad Al-Masdar News reported that the Turkish military began training its allied Syrian forces on air landings via helicopters in Afrin in anticipation of possible planned operations against the SDF.
- 12 April - Turkish forces shelled YPG positions near Tell Rifaat. The YPG responded by shelling positions under Turkish and SNA control. Russian military police had withdrawn from the location two days before.
- 20 April - The HRE claimed to have carried out a series of operations against the Turkish occupation in the villages of Meryamin and Vilat al-Qadi, in addition to the village of Kimara, where more than six Turkish soldiers were allegedly killed.

May

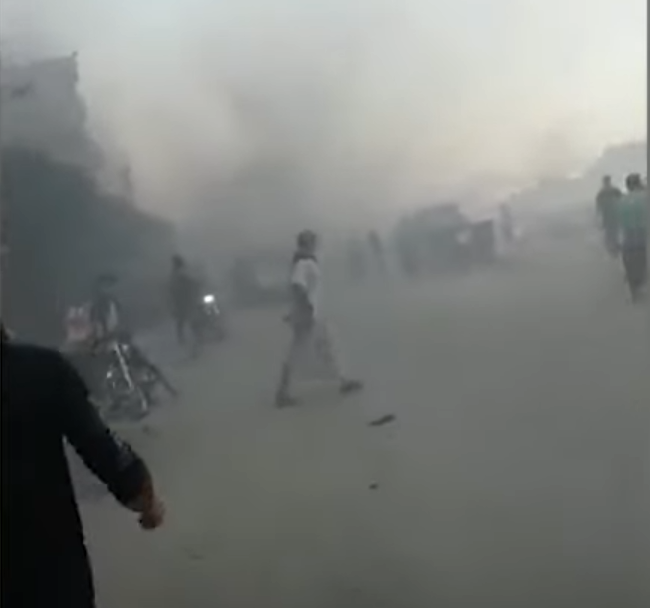
- Aftermath of a car bombing in Afrin, 2019.
  4 May - Heavy clashes erupted between Turkish Armed Forces and allied SNA forces with the HRE over the earlier death of two Turkish soldiers. During the fighting, the SNA captured three villages in the northern part of the Tell Rifaat Subdistrict from the HRE, but were later forced to withdraw due to a counter-attack and large number of landmines. The HRE claimed to have killed 40 SNA fighters, including their field commander "Ahmad Jamil Harboushi" and released several images displaying enemy losses. A larger Turkish operation targeting Tell Rifaat was later cancelled, which resulted in a Turkish-SNA defeat.
- 7 May - The HRE released a video in which they claimed to have injured 3 SNA militants in Azaz with an ATGM.
- 9 May - The HRE released two videos showing the death of four SNA militants and the destruction of a bulldozer using an ATGM in the Sherawa district of Afrin region.
- 13 May - Two SNA fighters were found dead with gunshot wounds near Sijaraz village in the countryside of Azaz. No group had claimed responsibility for the attack.
- 31 May - The HRE released a video of a drone attack targeting an SNA base in the village of Jalbir, Afrin region. According to the HRE, two Turkish soldiers were killed as a result.

June

- 19 June - According to the HRE, its fighters carried out a sabotage action targeting 3 vehicles of Turkish-backed groups that were patrolling in Dewara Kawa and Qews areas in Afrin city centre on June 19. Furthermore, the group stated, that the attack left two vehicles damaged, one Turkish-backed militiaman dead and six others heavily wounded.

July

- 11 July - Syrians for Truth and Justice reported on a car bomb attack which killed at least 13 and injured 55 at a checkpoint on the entrance to Afrin city. The Wrath of Olives Operations Room claimed responsibility for the bombing stating that it targeted a checkpoint of the Turkish-backed military police and the Levant Front.
- 23 July - The SOHR reported that HRE forces attacked positions of the Turkish-backed Sham Legion in the town of Fafirtin in the Afrin region, resulting in the deaths of six Sham Legion fighters, including a commander, and injuring three others. The HRE claimed responsibility for the attack and identified the slain Sham Legion commander as Yasin Ibrahim.

August

In early August, the SOHR reported that Turkish-backed groups had suffered 'sizable losses' in Afrin over the last year as a result of attacks carried out by the HRE and other Kurdish factions.

- 5 August - The HRE stated that it attacked and killed eight fighters belonging to Ahrar al-Sham and Suqour al-Sham at a military base near Mare', while injuring four more, utilizing AK47 rifles and PK light machine guns as well as RPG-7s during the attack. On the same day, HRE also stated that it attacked a Hamza Division base near al-Bab, claiming that three Hamza Division members were killed and three more were injured. Furthermore, an IED killed a commander of Ahrar al-Sham, Hussein al-Amin.
- 6 August - The HRE published a video and stated that it targeted a military vehicle belonging to Turkish-backed Levant Front near Mare' town. The vehicle was destroyed with an ATGM.
- 9 August - The HRE stated that it had killed seven Turkish soldiers during an attack on a Turkish military checkpoint. In another statement the HRE claimed to have killed six Turkish soldiers, while also destroying a Turkish tank.
- 27 August - An IED targeted a minibus transporting pro-Turkish Syrian fighters, in Azaz, Aleppo, killing two militants and wounding nine others.

October

- 11 October - Reuters and Turkish sources reported that two Turkish soldiers were killed in a mortar attack near Azaz, originating from Tel Rifaat during Operation Peace Spring.

The Georgetown Security Studies Review stated in a report in October, that Turkey and its allied militants "have proven unable to defeat this insurgency as it approaches its second year," highlighting the ongoing security chaos in the region.

November

- 16 November - As part of the November 2019 Syria bombings, car bombs detonated near a bus station and a taxi station in Al-Bab, killing at least 19 and injuring around 50 others. Turkey condemned the attack and said the PKK was behind the bombing.

== 2020 ==
January

- 20 January - The SOHR reported the explosion of a car-bomb in the city of Afrin, injuring six people, including a child, and causing extensive damage to the site of the explosion.
- 26 January - SOHR sources reported an explosion in Azaz city which caused massive destruction and damage to properties. The car-bomb killed seven unidentified people, including at least one child, while over 20 others were injured with varying severity.
- 27 January - An explosion, caused by an IED planted in a car, injured at least one person in Afrin city.

February

- 8 February - An IED went off in a vehicle in the Industrial area within the Turkish-controlled city of Afrin. The explosion left two people wounded with varying severity, the SOHR reported.

March

- 18 March - According to the SOHR shelling by members of the HRE resullted in the killing of five people (including two children) and injury of more than 15.
- 20 March - Clashes occurred near Basuta west of Tell Rifaat between the HRE and the SNA. Injured from the Hamza Division were taken to the Military Hospital in Afrin according to a local source.

April

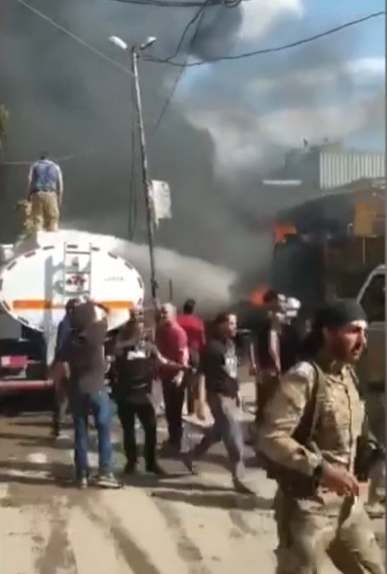
Aftermath of the car bombing in Afrin, 28 April 2020.

- 4–7 April - The HRE said in a statement, that they conducted various actions in which they killed seven SNA militants, a Turkish soldier, and also claimed the destruction of two military vehicles.
- 18 April - A car bomb injured three near Afrin's Al-Saraya roundabout, the SOHR reported.
- 28 April - The Afrin bombing killed 53 people, including 11 children. Turkey shifted blame on the YPG, while the YPG made rebel infighting responsible for the bombing. According to the head of the SOHR, at least six pro-Turkish Syrian fighters were among those killed in the blast with a possibility of increase in the death toll. At least 47 people were reported injured, according to Al Jazeera. According to the governor of the neighbouring Hatay province, across the Turkish border, the explosion was believed to have been caused by the rigging of a fuel tanker with hand grenades. Many people, alongside those who got trapped in their cars were burnt to death as a result of the blast, Syrian activists disclosed.

May

- 5–11 May - HRE forces claimed to have killed at least six SNA militants and Turkish soldiers in addition to injuring multiple in various assaults, while also destroying a vehicle. A video of the attacks was released, in which the HRE utilised ATGMs.
- 6 May - The HRE released a video of two separate attacks in the Afrin region. According to the HRE, two Turkish soldiers and two Turkish-backed fighters were killed as a result of the attacks. On the same day an IED targeted the vehicle of a Sultan Murad Division commander, who was "responsible for several crimes against locals in Afrin," as was reported by the SOHR.
- 12 May - The HRE announced that at least six "invaders" were killed during actions carried out between 5–11 May in Afrin region and Mare' town.
- 19 May - An IED exploded near the Al-Qebban roundabout on the road to Jinderes which injured two people.
- 21 May - A former Islamic State (ISIS) commander named Abu Zaki al-Taybani, who was the head of ISIS's military operations in the Hama Governorate was killed by a CJTF-OIR drone strike in Afrin. He had defected to the SNA and had previously executed several members of ISIS's former offshoot and rival Hayat Tahrir al-Sham (HTS) prior to defecting to the SNA.
- 28 May - The HRE announced that at least nine "occupiers" were killed, including a commander, as a result of several operations carried out between 17 and 25 May.

June

- 13 June - The Turkish Ministry of National Defense and Turkish state-owned media claimed that six "PKK/YPG terrorists" were arrested in the "Olive Branch" region.
- 19 June - The HRE claimed to have killed 14 "mercenaries" and a number of others were wounded in the Sherawa region. The HRE also released a video in which they displayed weapons which they supposedly seized during the operation, including four AK-47s, one PKM with ammunition, one RPG-7, one Zbrojovka Brno rifle, and 1 thermal weapon sight.
- 21 June - The HRE released graphic footage in which they claimed to have killed 14 Turkish-backed militants. The attack was reportedly conducted in retaliation for the earlier death of three HRE fighters. The HRE also released a video in which they displayed weapons which they seized during the operation, including four AK-47s, one PKM with ammunition, one RPG-7, one Zbrojovka Brno rifle, and 1 thermal weapon sight.
- 24 June - A booby-trapped motorcycle exploded in Al-Mahmoudiyah street in the city of Afrin, killing two people and injuring nine others, the SOHR reported.

July

21 July - An explosion, caused by the detonation of an IED, occurred on the outskirts of Afrin, the SOHR reported. No casualties had been reported.

August

- 12 August - The Turkish government claimed that 20 "PKK/YPG terrorists" were arrested while planning an attack in the Olive Branch region.
- 14 August - The Turkish government claimed that four "PKK/YPG terrorists" were arrested while planning an attack in the Olive Branch region.
- 22 August - According to pro-Kurdish sources, the Turkish army and allied pro-Turkish fighters shelled the town of Tell Rifaat and the village of Sheikh Issa.

September

- 14 September - The HRE released a video of their attacks against two Turkish bases located in the village of Xizewiye in the Jindires district of Afrin region. According to the HRE, seven Turkish soldiers were killed and ten others wounded as a result of the operations. Shortly after, a booby-trapped vehicle went off near the Kawa roundabout and in front of the headquarters of a pro-Turkish armed group in Afrin's city center. The SOHR reported that 10 had been killed and 35 injured, including civilians. Turkey blamed the attack on the SDF, while ReliefWeb said that no group had claimed responsibility and that the attack is believed to be "related to the presence of Turkish factions." The Turkish army shelled several villages with artillery in Tell Rifaat Subdistrict thereafter, according to local and Kurdish sources.
- 15 September - SNA fighters attempted to infiltrate HRE positions in Maranaz village, but were repelled and lost two fighters. Heavy clashes ensued between the SNA and HRE around the village with Turkish artillery shelling HRE positions.
- 21 September - Clashes occurred between the HRE and Turkish-backed fighters near Kafr Khasir and Maranaz villages.

== 2021 ==
January

- 30 January - A car bombing killed at least five people and wounded 22 other in Afrin city. The Turkish government accused the YPG of being behind the attack.

February

- 24 February - An explosion, caused by the detonation of an IED in a car in Al-Villat street in Afrin city, injured at least three people and caused material damage.

March

- 16 March - According to the SOHR, an IED planted in a civil car parked near the "commandos" military training center in Afrin city exploded, while Turkish-backed militiamen were attempting to dismantle it. The explosion resulted in the death of two militiamen, while others were lightly wounded. The explosion also caused material damage.

May

In the month of May, HRE forces claimed to have killed and wounded 11 Turkish soldiers and affiliated militants, while also damaging a military vehicle. According to a statement, the actions were carried out in Afrin city, Rajo, Jarabulus, the village of Kafar Kheish near Azaz, and the village of Kul Jibreen.

June

- 3 June - The HRE released a video, in which they displayed their attack on SNA militias in the village of Bosufan, Afrin. The attack was carried out using a 9M113 Konkurs anti-tank missile.

August

- 15 August - The SOHR reported that a member of the SNA was shot dead by SDF snipers in the 'peace spring' operation area.
- 18 August - A number of civilians were killed and injured in a rocket attack directed at Afrin city.
- 22 August - The SOHR reported that a member of the Turkish-backed Maghawir al-Shamal, a branch of the SNA, was killed and others were injured in Kafr Khasher after SDF forces targeted the area with a guided missile. Heavy artillery shelling followed on al-Qamiyah, al-Irshadiyah and Kafr Khasher.

September

- 2 September - Hawar News Agency, which is affiliated with the AANES, reported that the HRE claimed responsibility for the killing of 11 SNA fighters in a series of coordinated day and night operations targeting military positions along the Afrin-Shahba contact line.
- 5 September - One to three civilians were killed, while four to six were injured in a car bombing, Afrin city.
- 7 September - The SDF-affiliated Al-Bab Military Council released a statement claiming that it targeted Turkish army headquarters, observatory points and SNA posts in the al-Yashli village in a "potent bombing," destroying "a large part of the headquarters, armored vehicles, and fortifications. Other high impact strikes affected fortifications, armored machines, and heavy weapons in the headquarters perimeter." The statement added that 12 Turkish soldiers and 10 SNA were killed, while others were wounded. Casualties were not denied or confirmed by the Turkish side. In response, the SNA attacked SDF points with artillery and rocket launchers.
- 12 September - The HRE released footage depicting an assault on a SNA position, during which the attackers made use of night-vision equipment. Several SNA fighters were wounded after being engaged at close range, and the HRE raiding force captured a number of light weapons from the site.
- 13 September - An IED exploded in a car carrying a military commander of the Turkish-backed Hamza Division and two of his companions in Rajo district, killing them instantly, the SOHR reported.
- 14 September - A bombing hit the Ashrafieh neighborhood in Afrin, causing material damage, the SOHR reported.
- 23 September - An explosive device exploded in a car in the Ashrafieh neighborhood, causing material damage, the SOHR reported.

October

- 11 October - A car bomb killed four Turkish-backed fighters and five civilians, 12 more were injured, as reported by the SOHR. The explosion occurred near a market and military outpost for the Turkish-backed Islamist militia Jaysh al-Islam.

According to the SOHR, 47 explosions occurred in 2021 in areas under the Euphrates Shield administration and in surrounding regions. The explosions resulted in 32 deaths. Among the victims were 21 civilians, including six children and three women, and 11 members of Turkish-backed factions. Nearly 114 other individuals sustained various injuries.

== 2022 ==
January

- 13 January - Three separate bombings in Afrin, Azaz and Al-Bab killed at least one pro-Turkish fighter, one civilian and injured dozens more, the SOHR reported.

March

- 26 March - A member of Ahrar Al-Sham was shot by a Kurdish sniper in Azaz's countryside, the SOHR reported.

April

- 11 April - A member of Jaysh al-Islam was critically injured by masked gunmen in Afrin, the SOHR reported.
- 22 April - In the morning an artillery barrage by Kurdish forces on Maree' killed one Turkish soldier, wounded several more, and damaged one armored vehicle, the SOHR reported. In the afternoon the Turkish army responded with their own shelling on Kurdish positions, however no casualties were reported.
- 26 April - An SNA fighter was killed after being shot by a Kurdish sniper in the village of al-Tuways, north of Aleppo, according to the SOHR.
- 27 April - A Hamza Division leader died from wounds sustained in an assassination attempt the previous day, the SOHR reported. That same day a commander of the Al-Rahman Legion and another unidentified man were injured in an IED attack in Afrin city.
- 30 April - Three Turkish-backed Hamza Division fighters were killed in an infiltration attack by the HRE in Afrin's eastern countryside, the SOHR reported.

May

- 4 May - A Turkish soldier was killed and several others were injured, after Kurdish forces bombarded their positions in the north-western countryside of Aleppo, the SOHR reported.
- 5 May - HRE forces and the SNA clashed in the northern Aleppo countryside with no casualties reported.
- 9 May - A member of the Levant Front was killed in clashes with Kurdish forces in the Afrin countryside, the SOHR reported.
- 12–17 May - The HRE announced that it conducted operations against Turkish-backed groups and reiterated its commitment to "deal heavy blows to the invading Turkish army." Coinciding the SOHR reported of a rocket attack on a Turkish military base in Hazwan and the vicinity of Maree' city, amid reports that Turkish soldiers had been injured.

August

At the beginning of August the HRE claimed to have killed one commander, five soldiers, and injured 11 soldiers of the Turkish army in actions against Turkish military bases in al-Bab, Shera, Afrin and Azaz.

- 11 August - The HRE claimed to have destroyed a jeep in Mare', which resulted in the death of three "mercenaries" and injury of two others.
- 12 August - HRE fighters claimed to have killed three and injured five Turkish soldiers, when they targeted a Turkish military base in al-Bab. The group released drone footage of the attacks, which appeared to show explosive impacts within what it described as a Turkish military facility.
- 14 August - HRE fighter targeted a vehicle near the town of Ma‘batli with an IED, which allegedly killed two Turkish-backed militants. Furthermore, the group released video footage of the attack.
- 17 August - The HRE claimed to have killed two and injured two more Turkish-backed militants in the town of Maryamayn.

November

- 24 November - According to the SOHR, Turkish forces and their proxies shelled Kurdish-held areas in Sad Al-Shuhabaa in northern Aleppo countryside, al-Irshadiyah and al-Shawargha in Sharran district, and Al-Mayasa and Abin in Afrin countryside.

== 2023 ==
July

- 29 July - The SOHR reported that five SNA fighters were killed in a Kurdish infiltration operation on the Kaljibrin frontline, north of Aleppo.
- 31 July - Two members of the SNA were killed and three more were severely injured, when Kurdish forces shelled their positions in Basofan village in Shirawa district in the Afrin countryside, the SOHR reported.

August

- 9 August - Shelling by Kurdish forces on the "Kuwait Al-Rahma" Camp, which houses Syrian Arab IDPs who had been resettled to the Kurdish-majority region of Afrin, killed one and injured seven more, the SOHR and the Syrian Network for Human Rights reported.
- 16 August - Two Turkish-backed fighters of the Hamza Division were injured in an attack on their military position by two masked gunmen on a motorcycle in Kemar village in Sherawa district, Afrin countryside, the SOHR reported.

September

- 5 September - Two members of the Turkish-backed Sultan Suleiman Shah Division and Hamza Division were killed and three others were injured in artillery shelling by the Manbij Military Council on military checkpoint in Qabasin, eastern Aleppo countryside, the SOHR reported.
- 6 September - The SOHR reported eight SNA fighters were killed in a Kurdish attack on two military vehicles on the Al-Boghaz frontline, west of Manbij.
- 8 September - Four members of the Turkish-backed Sultan Murad Division and Hamza Division were killed in a "sneak attack" by the HRE in the Shirawa district in Afrin countryside, the SOHR reported.
- 9 September - Three Turkish-backed SNA fighters were killed in clashes with the HRE in the al-Bab countryside, the SOHR reported.
- 17 September - Seven members of the Turkish-backed Sham Legion were injured when their vehicle was targeted by a guided missile coming from the direction of the Kurdish-controlled Shabha Canton, the SOHR reported.
- 18 September - 14 SNA fighters were killed in a Kurdish infiltration attack on the outskirts of al-Bab city. The losses were reported by the SOHR and later confirmed by factional leaders of the SNA to AFP.

October

- 16 October - Six members of the Turkish-backed Sham Legion were killed and three others injured after the HRE targeted their position with a guided missile, the SOHR reported.

November

- 11 November - A member of the Jaysh al-Sharqiya faction of the Turkish-backed SNA was killed, and another was injured, following an armed attack carried out by unknown gunmen using pistols with silencers, the SOHR reported.
- 18 November - A truck-bound IED killed one person and injured nine others, when it exploded in front of a Turkish-backed military police station in Afrin city, the SOHR reported.
- 19 November - The HRE claimed to have killed a member of the Hamza Division, a report that was subsequently confirmed by the SOHR.
- 22 November - A member of the Hamza Division was killed in clashes with the HRE in Shirawa district in Afrin countryside, the SOHR reported.
- 30 November - Pro-SDF Afrinpost reported that the HRE targeted positions of Turkish-backed groups with rockets, resulting in the injury of three "Fursan al-Sharqiya Brigade" members.

December

- 11 December - An IED, which was planted on a car, injured three members of the Turkish-backed military police near a checkpoint in the northern Aleppo countryside, the SOHR reported.

== 2024 ==
January

- 15 January - A member of the Turkish-backed Jaysh al-Sharqiya was killed and another was injured by unidentified gunmen in Tel Tawil in the Afrin countryside, the SOHR reported.
- 20 January - Pro-SDF Afrinpost reported that the HRE targeted Turkish military bases in the villages of Dabiq and Kaljibrin in the northern Aleppo countryside with a barrage of 10 rockets.
- 30 January - Pro-SDF Afrinpost reported that the HRE carried out a ‘major operation’ against Turkish positions in Basilê/Basalhayya in the Sherawa region. Accompanying video footage showed HRE fighters striking the positions with ATGMs and subsequently advancing on the buildings. The HRE statement claimed that the operation resulted in the deaths of 20 Turkish soldiers and SNA fighters and injured 25 others, while five HRE members were killed.

February

- 5 February - Clashes broke out between the HRE and Turkish-backed fighters in the Sharan district of Afrin countryside, though no casualties were reported according to the SOHR.

July

- 16 July - Clashes between Kurdish forces and Turkish-backed factions west of Al-Bab city led to the death of two SNA members, the SOHR reported.
- 20 July - In an infiltration operation HRE forces killed two Levant Front members, while others were injured in the Al-Bab area, the SOHR reported.
- 21 July - Three SNA fighters were killed following clashes with the HRE, the SOHR reported.

At the end of the month the SOHR reported that the Manbij Military Council, and in a rare instance, the Kurdish Front had been engaged in clashes with Turkish-backed groups throughout the month.

August

- 3 August - At least five Turkish-backed militants were killed in an infiltration operation by HRE forces near the city of Afrin, according to the SOHR.
- 5 August - An assassination attempt against a Sultan Murad Division leader in Bulbul was reported by the SOHR.
- 7 August - An explosion of a booby-trapped truck near a checkpoint of the Turkish-backed military police in Azaz city killed ten people including at least four members of the SNA, while 13 people were injured, the SOHR reported.
- 14 August - A VBIED injured two people in Afrin city, the SOHR reported.
- 18 August - A member of Hay’at Tahrir al-Sham (HTS) was killed in clashes with HRE forces, the SOHR reported.
- 21 August - Two people were injured by an explosion of booby-trapped motorcycle in Afrin city, the SOHR reported.
- 25 August - The body of an executed member of the Turkish-backed National Front for Liberation was found dumped in Jindires, the SOHR reported. That same day a Turkish-backed fighter was killed and another injured, when ammunition exploded inside a military warehouse of the Mohamed Al-Fateh Faction near the local council in Afrin city.
- 30 August - Three members of the SNA were killed and five were wounded in clashes with the SDF's Manbij Military Council in the Jarabulus countryside, the SOHR reported.

September

- 7 September - A "sneak attack" by the HRE led to the death of three Turkish-backed fighters in the Afrin countryside, the SOHR reported.
- 21 September - A Kurdish infiltration attempt injured three Turkish-backed fighters in Mare', the SOHR reported.

October

- 26 October - Two Turkish-backed fighters were killed in clashes with the HRE, including a fighter of the "Liwa Al-Uzbek", the SOHR reported.

According to pro-Kurdish sources, operations carried out by the HRE between September 9 and October 9, resulted in the death of 24 SNA militants, including two Turkish soldiers, and the wounding of 13 others.

November

- 23 November - An infiltration-operation by HRE forces led to the killing of two and injury of two more Levant Front members near Kafr Khasher, as was reported by the SOHR.
- 25 November - Turkey-based Bianet reported, that heavy fighting erupted between the Sham Front and the HRE. Two Sham Front militants were killed, and two others injured.

=== Fall of the Assad regime ===
On 27 November, the Sunni Islamist Hay’at Tahrir al-Sham (HTS) launched a major offensive on Aleppo, which led to the collapse of the Assad regime. At the same time, allied SNA and Turkish forces began Operation Dawn of Freedom, aimed at expelling the remaining encircled Kurdish forces, including the HRE, from Tell Rifaat and the wider Shahba region. The operation resulted in intense clashes between HRE and SNA units. With support of an SDF corridor along the Aleppo and Dayr Hafir axis, HRE and other Kurdish groups were able to withdraw to AANES territory and the Kurdish-held neighbourhood of Sheikh Maqsoud in Aleppo city.

== See also ==
- Eastern Syria insurgency
- Insurgency in Idlib
- Second Northern Syria Buffer Zone
