= 2020 Nice stabbing =

Stabbing attack in France

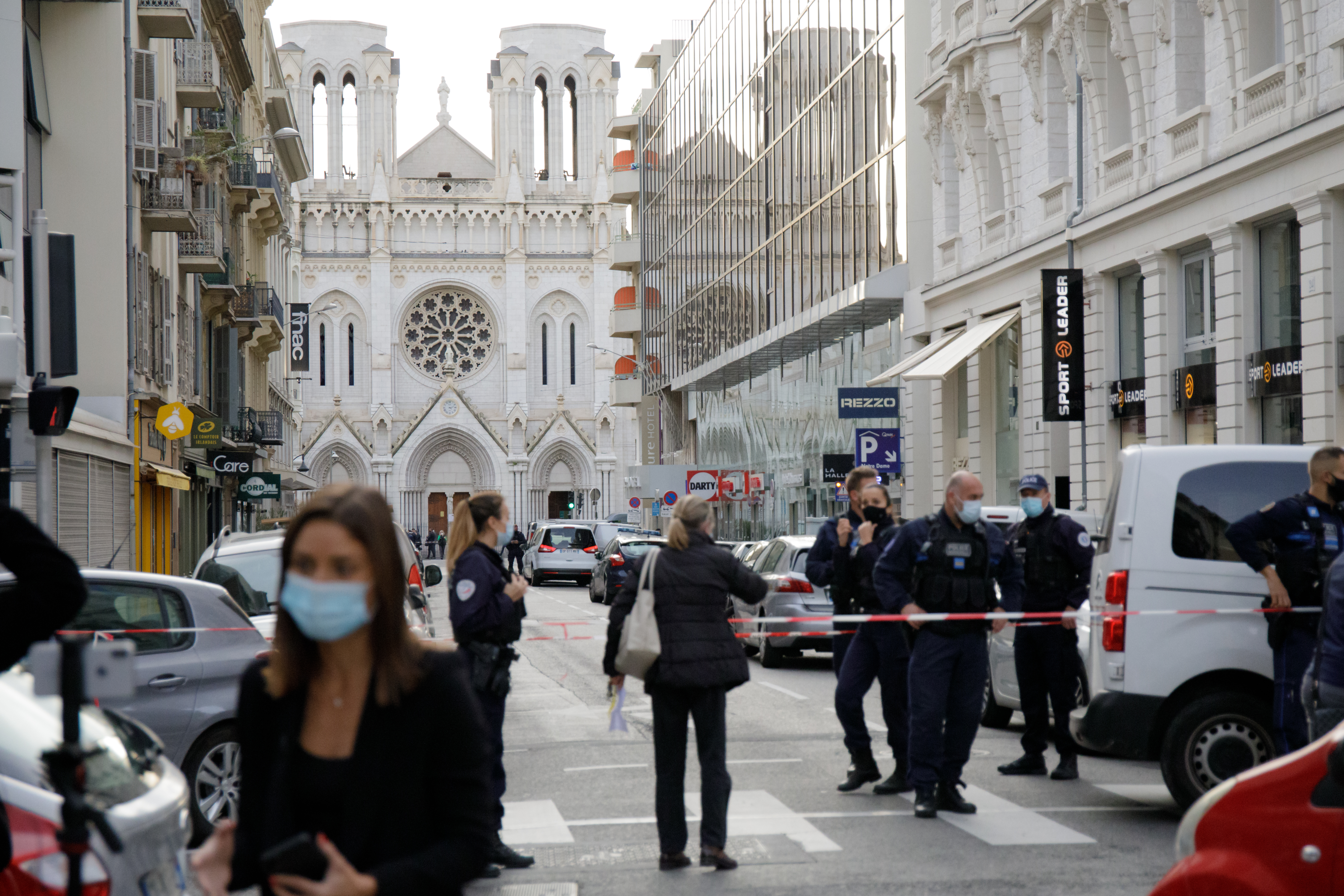
- The road in front of Notre-Dame de Nice closed by the French police after the attack
- Location: Notre-Dame de Nice, Nice, France
- Date: 29 October 2020; 6 years ago 8:30 (CET (UTC+01:00))
- Attack type: Stabbing
- Weapon: Knife
- Deaths: 3
- Injuries: 1 (the perpetrator)
- Perpetrator: Brahim Aouissaoui
- Motive: Islamic extremism

On the morning of 29 October 2020, three people were killed in a stabbing attack at Notre-Dame de Nice, a Catholic basilica in Nice, France. The attacker, Tunisian man Brahim Aouissaoui, was shot by the police and taken into custody. He was convicted and sentenced to life imprisonment in 2025.

Both French President Emmanuel Macron and the mayor of Nice, Christian Estrosi, said it was a terrorist attack attributed to Islamic extremism.

== Background ==
In recent years, France has seen many jihadist terrorist attacks, carried out by both Islamic State and Al-Qaeda terrorist cells, and by lone-wolf terrorists. Nice was the scene of a truck attack in 2016, which resulted in the deaths of 86 people. Four weeks prior to this attack, French President Emmanuel Macron described Islam as a religion "in crisis" worldwide, prompting backlash from Muslims. He vowed to present a bill to strengthen a 1905 law that officially separated church and state in France. Two weeks later, Samuel Paty, a history teacher, was accused by an unnamed student of showing his classes offensive Charlie Hebdo cartoons depicting the Islamic prophet Muhammad. The student who provided the original account of Paty's lesson was, in fact, a truant. She later admitted to lying about being present and having exaggerating others' accounts in order to blame Paty for her recent suspension from school.

Despite this, her account incited anger among the Islamic community in France and eventually led to the murder and beheading of Paty in the Île-de-France by an 18-year-old Chechen Muslim who had acquired refugee status in France in March 2020. The female student's father had reportedly issued a fatwa against Paty based on his daughter's account. After Paty's murder, Macron defended the publication of cartoons depicting Muhammad on free speech grounds. Following these events, and Macron's defence of the cartoons in particular, Turkish President Recep Tayyip Erdoğan called for a boycott of French products. Several protests across the Muslim world followed, in which photographs of Macron were burned, accompanied by anti-French chants.

== Attack ==
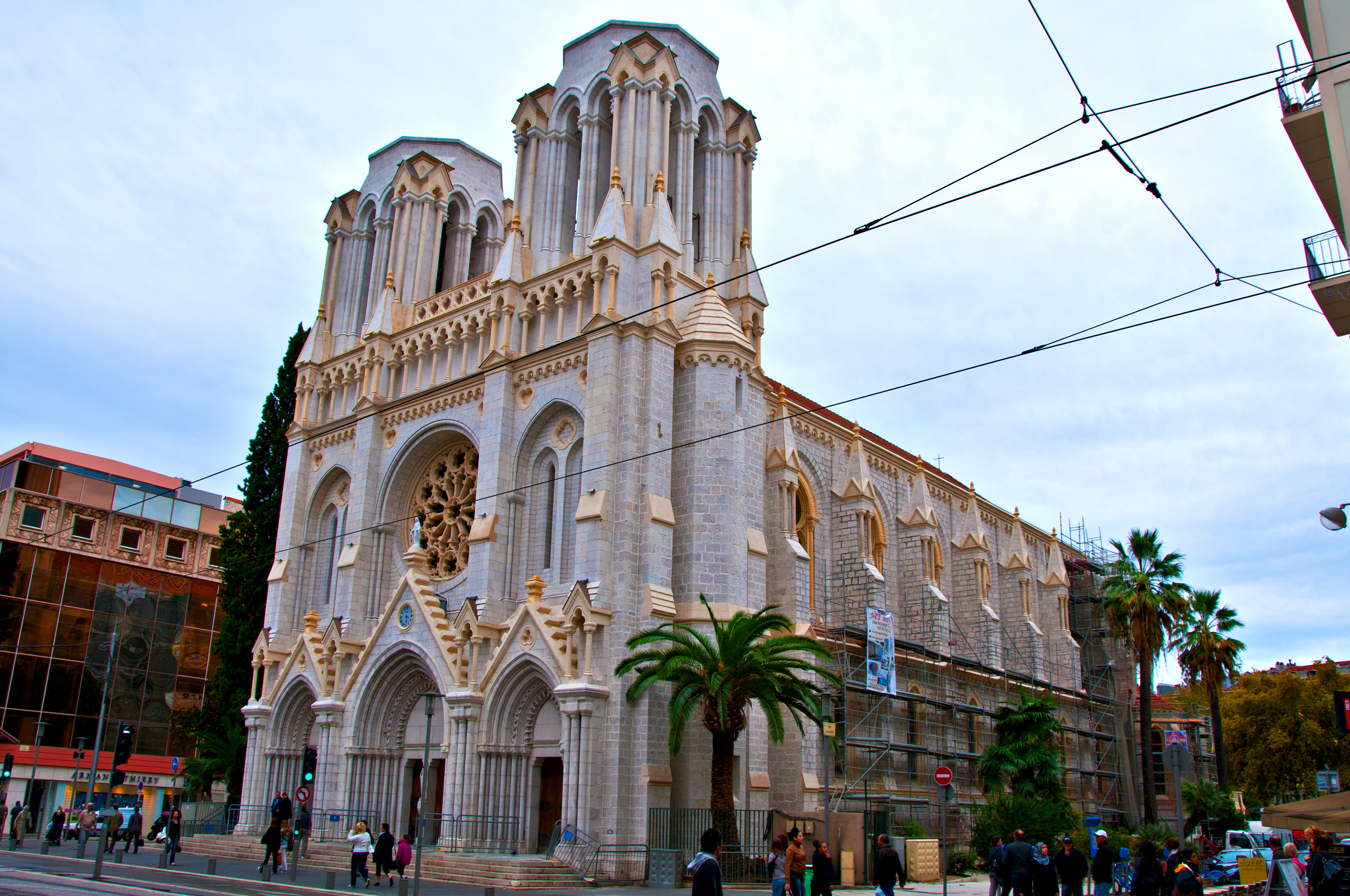
Notre-Dame de Nice, site of attack

The attack occurred on 29 October 2020 at 8:30 CET (7:30 GMT), in the premises of Notre-Dame de Nice, a Catholic basilica situated on the Avenue Jean Médecin in the centre of Nice. The attacker killed three people with a knife. One victim, a 60 year-old woman, received a "very deep throat cut like a decapitation". Another was the sexton of the church, and the third victim was another woman.

The attack was carried out over a span of 28 minutes, during which he shouted "Allahu Akbar," repeatedly. Four responding police officers first tasered the attacker and then shot him, even as he continued to shout, "Allahu Akbar!" The suspect was then taken to hospital, where he was in life-threatening condition. A total of 14 shots were fired by police. Authorities found items that they said belonged to the suspect, including a Quran, three knives, and two cell phones.

=== Immediate aftermath ===
Interior Minister Gérald Darmanin said immediately after that a police operation was underway in the city. A bomb disposal unit responded to the crime scene, while heavily armed anti-terror police officers patrolled the streets around the basilica.

In the days after the attack, police arrested two men who were believed to have been in contact with the attacker immediately prior to the incident.

== Perpetrator ==
The attacker was a 21-year-old Tunisian man, Brahim Aouissaoui (Arabic: إبراهيم العيساوي). He grew up close to Sfax, Tunisia. He had arrived as a migrant in late September 2020 at the island of Lampedusa, Italy, amidst the COVID-19 pandemic in Tunisia. He was required to spend 20 days in coronavirus quarantine, and he spent most of that time on his phone. According to Italian daily newspaper Corriere della Sera, Aouissaoui received a notice informing him that he was being expelled from Italy for illegal entry and had until 9 October to leave voluntarily, but his movement was not monitored. Instead of leaving Italy, on that day, he relocated to the port city of Bari, in southern Italy. There was no indication if there was any other action taken to ensure his cooperation. After his arrival in Bari, Aouissaoui traveled to Nice by train in the following days. His entry into France was facilitated by the identity card given to him by the Red Cross refugee NGO. In total he spent about 24h in France before the attack. In the morning of the day of the attack, he went to a mosque near Nice train station and prayed. After the prayer he went to the train station and spent some time there before making his way to Notre Dame de Nice, as detailed by Jean-François Ricard, chief of the antiterror prosecution unit Parquet national antiterroriste (PNAT).

In an interview with Al Arabiya after the attack, Aouissaoui's mother said she had been surprised when her son called to inform her he was in France, since he did not know the language or anyone there. His older brother told BBC News that Aouissaoui claimed he knew someone in France and that he would seek out this person for help. A neighbour told Al Arabiya that Aouissaoui worked as a mechanic and in other odd jobs while in Tunisia, but did not show any signs of radicalisation.

French chief anti-terrorism prosecutor Jean-François Ricard said that the suspect had not been on any intelligence agency's radar as a potential terrorist threat.

On 26 February 2025, Brahim Aouissaoui was sentenced to life imprisonment without the possibility of parole.

== Victims ==
Three people were killed in the attack. One was a 60-year-old woman who had been in the basilica praying; she was found with her throat cut very deeply, in what an official said appeared to be an attempt to decapitate her. Another was the 55-year-old male sexton, who died of a large throat wound. The third person killed was a 44-year-old Brazilian-born Frenchwoman who escaped from the church with several stab wounds, but collapsed and died at a nearby café.

== Reactions ==
=== French reactions ===
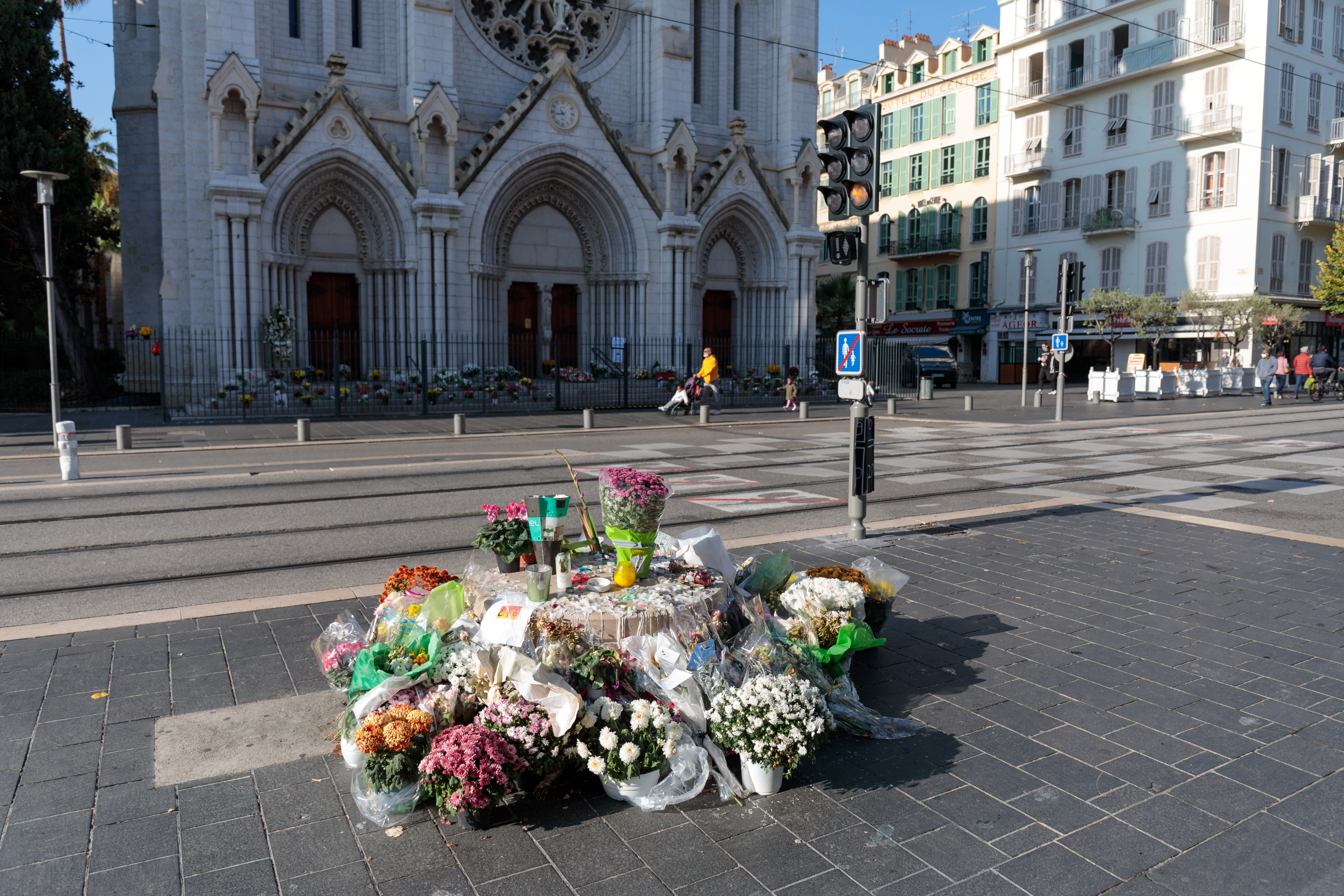
Memorial at the site of the attack

A moment of silence was held at the National Assembly after news of the stabbing arrived. President Emmanuel Macron visited the site of the attack later in the morning and called the incident an "Islamist terrorist attack". Macron called for firmness and unity and expressed his solidarity with the Catholic community of France. He also said that he would protect schools and places of worship by doubling the presence of security forces. French Interior Minister Gerald Damarnin said that France was engaged in a war against Islamist ideology, and that more attacks on French soil were likely, adding: "We are in a war against an enemy that is both inside and outside."

A representative of the French Council of the Muslim Faith condemned the attack, saying, "As a sign of mourning and solidarity with the victims and their loved ones, I call on all Muslims in France to cancel all the celebrations of the holiday of Mawlid."

=== Foreign reactions ===
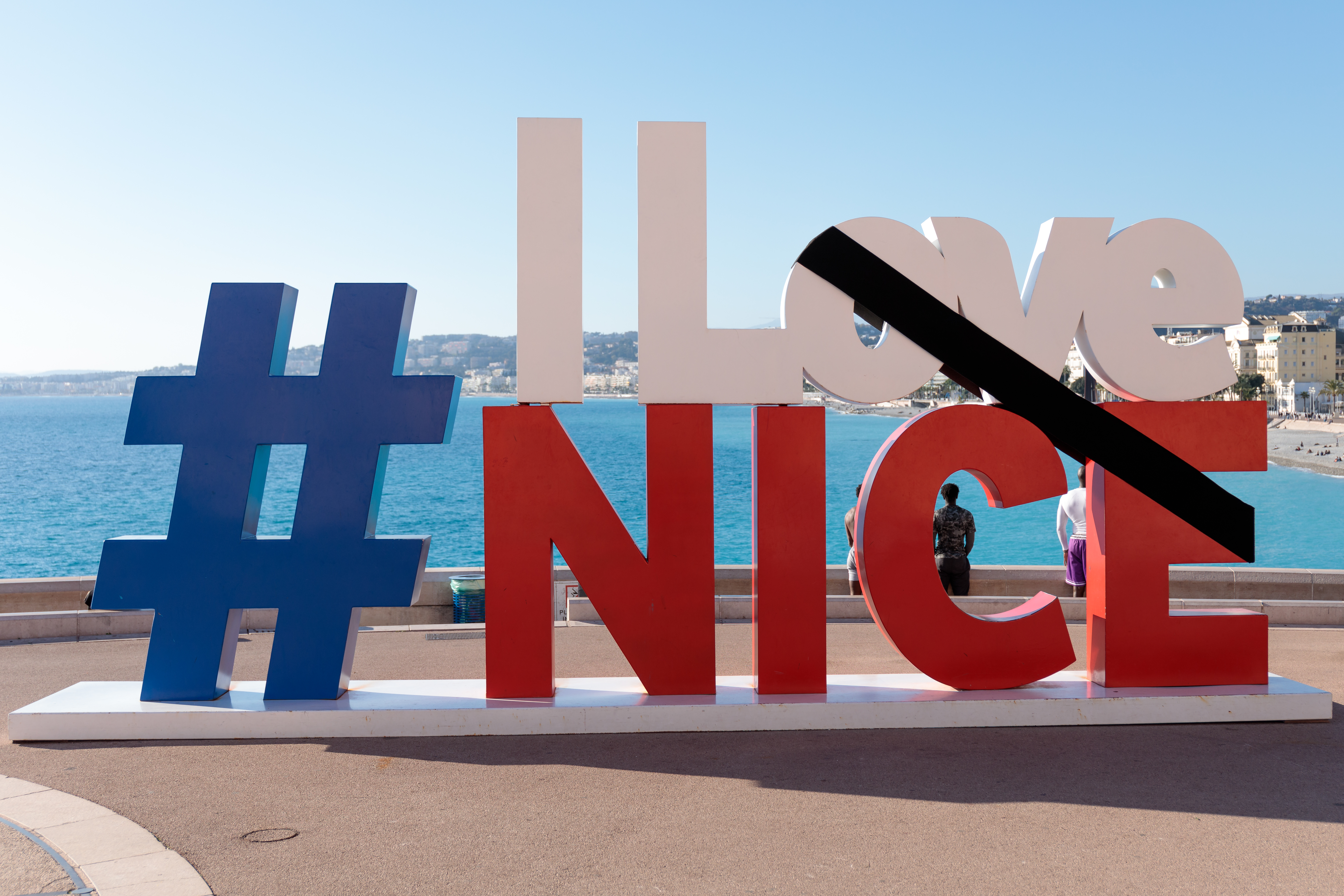
I Love Nice monument with a black band after the attack

Italian Interior Minister Luciana Lamorgese rejected calls to resign amidst accusations from the country's right-wing opposition parties that her department was responsible for Aouissaoui not being deported to Tunisia. European Parliament President David Sassoli, Spanish Prime Minister Pedro Sánchez, and Italian Prime Minister Giuseppe Conte all released statements expressing their condolences to the French people. Canadian Prime Minister Justin Trudeau denounced the attack by saying "We condemn absolutely these heinous, unacceptable terrorist attacks. There is absolutely nothing that justifies this violence." He furthermore said, "At the same time, we owe it to ourselves to recognize that these criminals, these terrorists, these murderers, do not represent in any way Islam or Muslim people." Trudeau did, however, temper his remarks with this qualification: "But freedom of expression is not without limits. We owe it to ourselves to act with respect for others and to seek not to arbitrarily or needlessly injure those with whom we are sharing a society and a planet." In a week where the Turkish-French relations were under tension, Turkey released a statement expressing their condolences to the French people, saying that "no reason could legitimise or excuse killing someone or violence. Those who conducted this savage attack at a sacred place of worship do not clearly share any religious, humane or moral values." The Kremlin condemned the killings, adding that it was also wrong to hurt the religious sentiments of people. Uruguay released a statement expressing its deepest concern over the attack and the desire to convey condolences and solidarity to the families of the victims, to the people and Government of France. The attack was also condemned by Saudi Arabia, Iran, and Pakistan.

Sudan Liberation Movement/Army (al-Nur) leader Abdul Wahid al Nur offered condolences to the French people and condemned the attacker, saying, "As victims of an ongoing Darfur genocide, rationalized on the basis of racism and reactionary precepts of Islamist extremism, we shudder at the attacker."

Hassan Nasrallah, the leader of Hezbollah, denounced the attack and elaborated: "You have protected the takfiri groups and sent them to commit crimes in Syria [...] You are paying the price of supporting the terrorist groups. [...] While we were fighting the terrorist in Syria, you were providing them with all the forms of support... The French authorities involved their country in an open war on Islam instead of addressing the original cause of the crisis represented by insults against Prophet Muhammad ...."

In 2021, Danish blogger Kim Møller was charged by Danish police for having shared a photo of the murder victim having her throat slit. He was first acquitted, then sentenced to a suspended jail sentence after an appeal, but finally acquitted by the Supreme Court in 2024.

=== Church reactions ===
The World Council of Churches expressed solidarity with the French nation and its churches following the Nice stabbing. Pope Francis offered prayers and expressed grief after the attack.

== See also ==
- 2020 in France
- 2020 Paris stabbing attack
- List of terrorist incidents in 2020
- List of terrorist incidents in France
