= Rajo, Syria =

Rajo رَاجُو
- Town
- Location within Syria
- Coordinates: 36°40′32″N 36°39′50″E
- Country: Syria
- Governorate: Aleppo
- District: Afrin
- Subdistrict: Rajo

Population (2004 census)
  - Total: 4,000
- Time zone: UTC+3 (AST)

Rajo (Arabic: رَاجُو, romanized: Rāǧū; Kurdish: Reco) or Raju is a town in Afrin District, Aleppo Governorate, northwestern Syria. Rajo is the center of a sub-district of the same name with approximately 65 villages and farms around it. The town has around 4,000 inhabitants while the total population of the sub-district is 21,955 (2004 official census).

Rajo is the administrative center of Nahiya Rajo of the Afrin District.

Rajo is an old settlement that lies on the Baylan plateau to the west of Kurd Mountain. The name Rajo originated from an old Kurdish family of the same name of the trunk Schaykh(k)an. Rajo was connected to the Baghdad Railway in 1912.

== Syrian civil war ==
On 7 September 2016, at around 18:00 local time, the Turkish army started shelling the village of Sorkê located 7 km west-southwest of Rajo with howitzers, mortar shells and tanks. Six members of the Kurdish YPG security forces were killed.

On 3 February 2018, armed clashes broke out in Bulbul and Rajo between the Turkish-backed Syrian National Army and the Syrian Democratic Forces’ People's Protection Units (YPG) amidst the Turkish military intervention. On 3 March, Turkey-led forces captured Rajo, which had become one of the major Kurdish strongholds in west Afrin. It was besieged on three sides and fell with no significant resistance. In June 2021, the Governor of Hatay announced plans for the establishment of an Atatürk Museum in the house Mustafa Kemal Atatürk stayed while fighting in World War I.

Since the attack by Turkish Forces into Rajo, the area has seen widespread destruction, and immense poverty. Accordingly in 2022, winter was threatening to create a famine for internally displaced persons in the region.
