= Rue Nicolas-Appert =

Street in Paris, France

Coordinates: 48.8590°N 2.3703°E

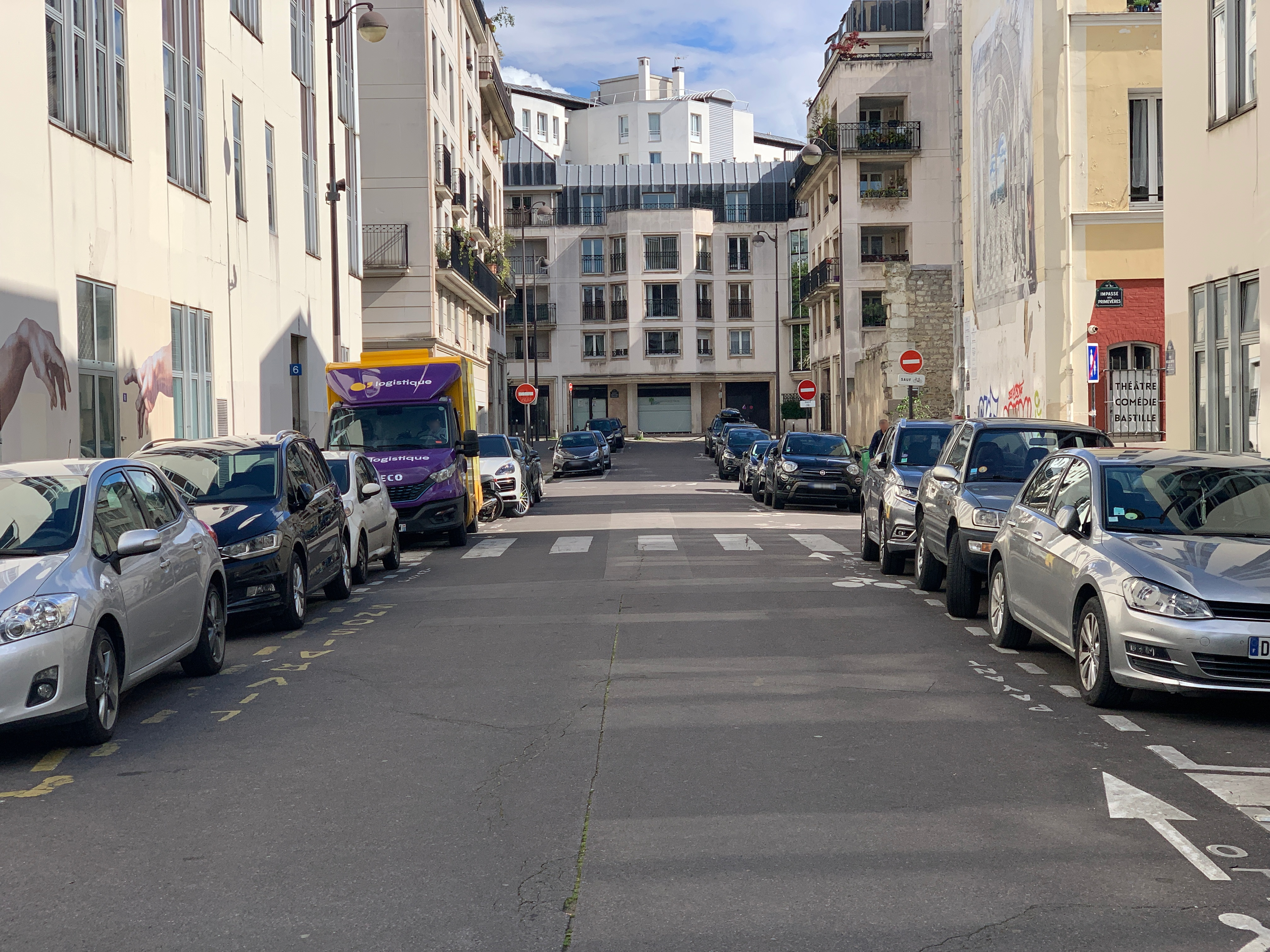
- Location: Paris, France
- From: Passage Sainte-Anne Popincourt
- To: Rue Pelée

The Rue Nicolas-Appert is a street in the 11th arrondissement of Paris, France.

== Location ==
The street is located in the Saint-Ambroise neighbourhood of the 11th arrondissement of Paris. It starts at the Passage Sainte-Anne Popincourt and runs all the way to the Rue Pelée. It is 137 metres (449 ft) long and 15 metres (49 ft) wide.

== History ==
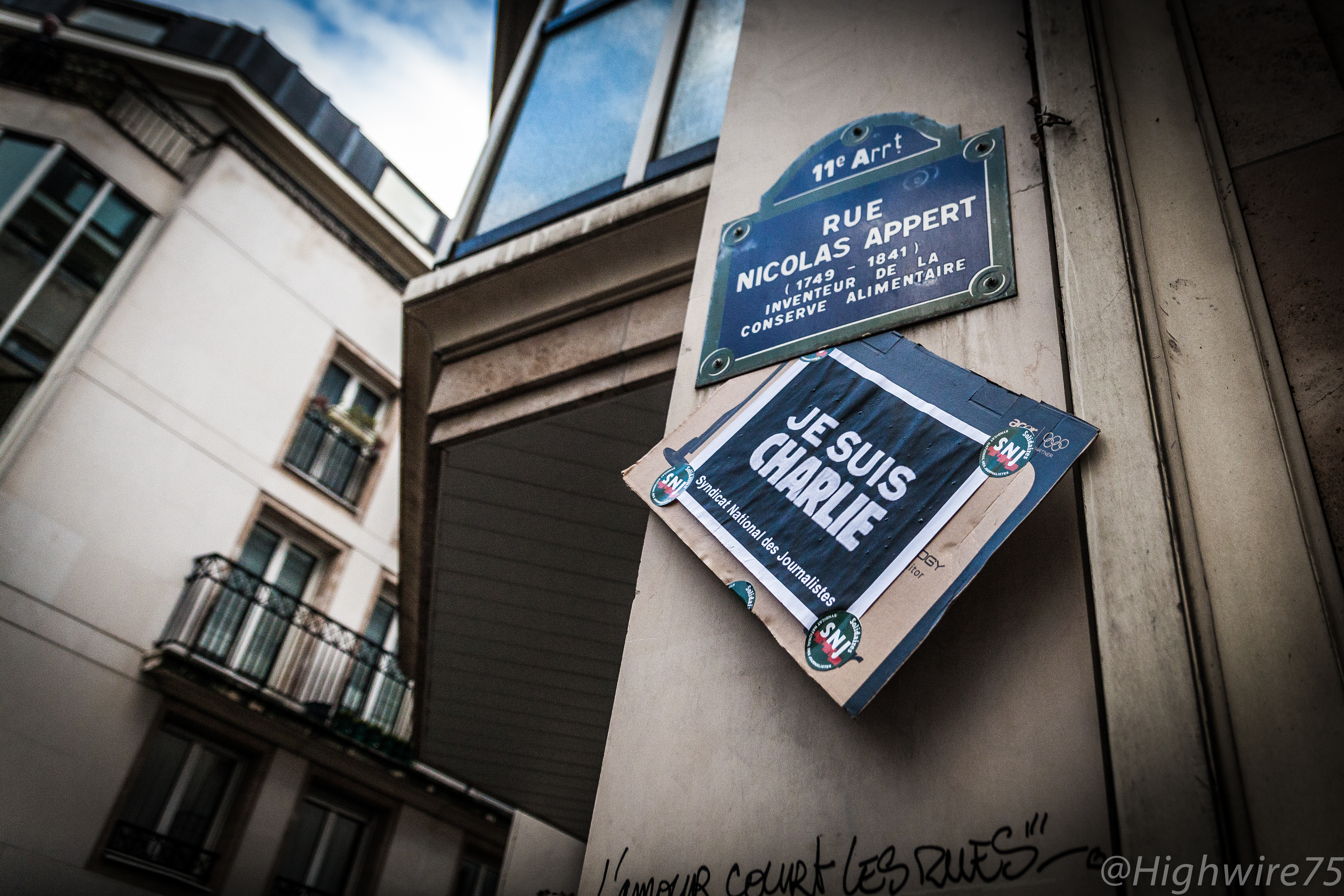
Rue Nicolas-Appert, one day after the Charlie Hebdo shooting

It was constructed in 1985 and named in honor of Nicolas Appert (1749-1841), a French businessman who invented airtight food preservation.

The Comédie Bastille, a theatre, is located at no. 5.

On 7 January 2015, the offices of the satirical weekly newspaper Charlie Hebdo at 10 rue Nicolas-Appert were attacked by Islamist terrorists. A commemorative plaque on the building records the names of eleven of the twelve people who were killed there. Charlie Hebdo has since moved. In September 2020, there was a stabbing attack outside of the former headquarters of Charlie Hebdo.
