= Nicolas Appert =

French confectioner and inventor (1749–1841)

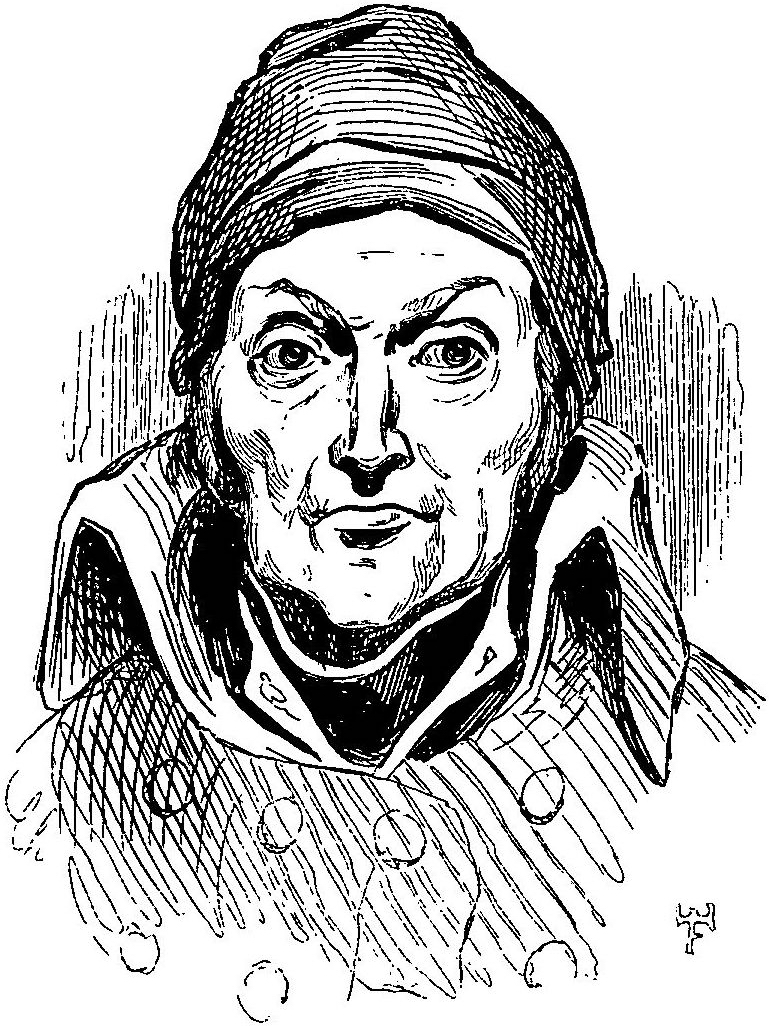
- A sketch of Nicolas Appert in 1841
- Born: 17 November 1749; Châlons-sur-Marne, Kingdom of France
- Died: 1 June 1841 (aged 91); Massy, Kingdom of France

Nicolas Appert (17 November 1749 – 1 June 1841) was a French confectioner and inventor who, in the early 19th century, invented airtight food preservation. Appert, known as the "father of food science", described his invention as a way "of conserving all kinds of food substances in containers".

== Early life ==
Appert was born in Châlons-en-Champagne, the ninth of eleven children. His family ran an inn in the town and he worked in the family business until the age of twenty, when he opened a brewery with one of his brothers. He then served as head chef to Christian IV, Count Palatine of Zweibrücken for thirteen years. Appert was a confectioner and chef in Paris from 1784 to 1795. During this period, he married Elisabeth Benoist and the couple had four children.

Appert was active during the French Revolution and took part in the execution of King Louis XVI. However, he fell under suspicion during the subsequent Reign of Terror and was arrested in April 1794, but he was able to avoid being executed himself. In 1795, he began experimenting with ways to preserve foodstuffs, succeeding with soups, vegetables, juices, dairy products, jellies, jams, and syrups. He placed the food in glass jars, sealed them with cork and sealing wax and placed them in boiling water (in later years, he switched to using an autoclave). It is believed that this technique was already being used by homemakers, but Appert was the first to do this on an industrial scale.

== Thermal processing (canning) ==
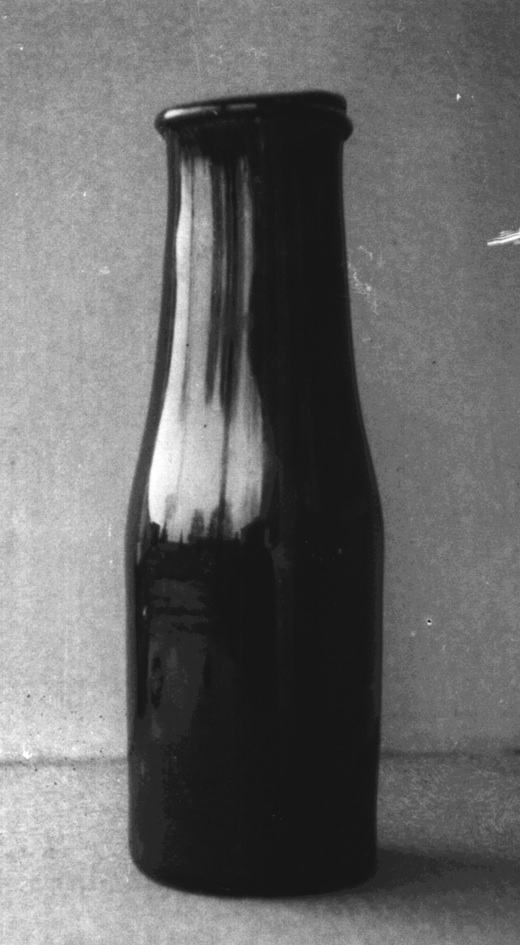
Appert canning jar

In 1804, La Maison Appert (English: The House of Appert), in the town of Massy, near Paris, became the first food bottling factory in the world, years before Louis Pasteur proved that heat killed bacteria. Appert then established a business to preserve a variety of food in sealed bottles. At first he used champagne bottles, imperfectly sealed by a mixture of cheese and mineral lime. Appert's method transitioned to filling thick, large-mouthed glass bottles with produce of every description, ranging from beef, fowl, eggs, milk, and prepared dishes. Appert avoided using tinplate in his early manufacture because the quality of French tinplate was poor. He left air space at the top of the bottle, and the cork would then be sealed firmly in the jar by using a vise. The bottle was then wrapped in canvas to protect it, dunked into boiling water, and boiled for as much time as Appert deemed appropriate for cooking the contents thoroughly. In honor of Appert, canning is sometimes called "appertization", which is distinct from pasteurization.

Despite his technical successes, Appert had financial troubles due to the high cost of his equipment and the fact that he was not a very good businessman. He declared bankruptcy in 1806, but was able to continue his business. In 1795, the French army had offered a prize of 12,000 francs for a new method to preserve food. In 1806 Appert presented a selection of bottled fruits and vegetables from his manufacture at the Exposition des produits de l'industrie française, but did not win any reward. In 1810 the Bureau of Arts and Manufactures of the Ministry of the Interior gave Appert an ex gratia payment of 12,000 francs on condition that he make his process public. (Note: In comparison, French workers had average daily wages of three francs.) Appert accepted and published a book describing his process that year. Appert's treatise was entitled L'Art de conserver les substances animales et végétales (The Art of Preserving Animal and Vegetable Substances), 6,000 copies of which were printed in 1810. This was the first book of its kind on modern food preservation methods.

Appert never truly understood why his method worked, as the science of bacteriology had not yet been developed, but it was so simple that it quickly became widespread. In 1810, British inventor and merchant Peter Durand patented his own method, but this time in a tin can, thus creating the modern-day process of canning foods. In 1812 Englishmen Bryan Donkin and John Hall purchased both patents and began producing preserves.

== Later life ==
Despite the government grant, Appert's financial situation did not improve and was exacerbated by the destruction of his factory at Massy by Prussian and Austrian forces at the end of the War of the Sixth Coalition in 1814. With the support of the French government in the form of free rent, he opened a new factory in Paris to preserve food in tin cans, which lasted for ten years until the same government evicted him in December 1827.

Appert's canned goods were widely appreciated, especially by naval services as the products were far superior to the dried and salted provisions on which they had previously relied. Cans were exported to Bavaria and Saint Petersburg, and received praise from newspapers across France. However, this did not translate into financial success. Despite silver and gold medals from the Société d'encouragement pour l'industrie nationale in 1816 and 1820 respectively, it was not until 1824 that he received the 2,000 francs associated with them.

In 1828, he opened yet another factory in the city. He petitioned Louis Philippe I for entry into the Legion of Honour but was denied, possibly due to his activities during the Revolution. Taking this as an insult, he retired in 1836 at the age of 86. Despite a pension of 1,200 francs a year from the government beginning that year, he died in poverty in 1841 and was buried in a pauper's grave.

== Posthumous honors ==
In 1955 a French postal stamp commemorated him.

In 1985 a street in Paris, the Rue Nicolas-Appert, was constructed and named in his honour. Many other streets in France bear his name.

In 1991, a monumental statue of Appert, a work in bronze by the artist Jean-Robert Ipousteguy, was erected in Châlons-en-Champagne. A plaque was affixed to his birthplace in 1986.

A room in the Musée des Beaux-Arts et d'Archéologie de Châlons-en-Champagne was dedicated to him.

There is a high school named after Nicolas Appert in Orvault, France.

2010 was declared Nicolas Appert Year, a national celebration, by the French ministry of culture. The Principality of Monaco issued a postage stamp featuring Appert. An exhibition entitled "Mise en boîte" was held at the Musée des Beaux-Arts et d'Archéologie de Châlons-en-Champagne.

== Nicolas Appert Award ==
Since 1942, each year the Chicago section of the Institute of Food Technologists has awarded the Nicolas Appert Award, recognizing lifetime achievement in food technology.

== Study association ==
The student association of the Food Technology education at Wageningen University is called Nicolas Appert. Since 1962 this association has focused on improving courses related to food technology education and organises several events each year for students and alumni. In 2022 the association celebrated its 12th lustrum.

== Sources ==
- Garcia, Rebeca; Adrian, Jean (2009), "Nicolas Appert: Inventor and Manufacturer", Food Reviews International, 25 (2): 115–125, doi:10.1080/87559120802682656, S2CID 83865891
- Barbier, Jean-Paul (1994), Nicolas Appert inventeur et humaniste (in French), Paris: Royer, ISBN 2-908670-17-8
- Day, Lance; McNeil, Ian, eds. (1996). Biographical Dictionary of the History of Technology. Routledge. ISBN 0-415-19399-0.
- Evans, Lindsay (2000), "Nicolas Appert", in Neil, Schlager; Josh, Lauer (eds.), Science and Its Times: Understanding the Social Significance of Scientific Discovery, ISBN 978-0787639327 – via Encyclopedia.com
- Robertson, Gordon L. (1998), Food Packaging: Principles and Practice, Marcel Dekker, ISBN 9780824701758
- Wiley, R.C. (30 April 1994), Minimally Processed Refrigerated Fruits & Vegetables, Springer Science & Business Media, ISBN 978-0-412-05571-3
- "Nicolas Appert", Encyclopedia of World Biography – via Encyclopedia.com
