= 2010 İskenderun attack =

Terrorist incident in Turkey

- Part of the Kurdish–Turkish conflict (1978-present)
- Location: İskenderun, Hatay Province, Turkey
- Date: 31 May 2010; 00:40 (EEST)
- Deaths: 6
- Injuries: 7–9
- Perpetrators: Kurdistan Workers' Party (Israel) Mossad (claimed)

2010 İskenderun attack was an attack in Mediterranean port city of İskenderun on 31 May 2010, around 00:40 perpetrated by the Kurdistan Workers Party (PKK). 6 soldiers died and 7 or 9 others were injured as a result of the attack.

== Background ==
İskenderun is a city in Turkey located in the Hatay Province. It is the second largest city in the province after Antakya, and is a port city located on the Mediterranean Sea.

The conflict between Turkey and the Kurdistan Workers' Party (PKK) (designated a terrorist organisation by Turkey, the United States, the European Union and NATO) has been active since 1984, primarily in the southeast of the country. More than 40,000 people have died as a result of the conflict.

== Attack ==
On 30 May 2010, around 23:58, a military vehicle carrying troops to the İskenderun Naval Base started its passage from Modernevler neighbourhood. Around 00:40, a few militants of the PKK stationed on Nur Mountains attacked the vehicle with RPG-7 grenade launchers and long-range weapons, killing 6 soldiers and injuring 7 or 9 other soldiers. Surviving soldiers and militants clashed for 15 minutes after the attack, no casualties occurred. Three of the injured were in a critical condition and were taken to a military hospital in the Ankara.

== Reactions ==
The president of Turkey, Abdullah Gül condemned the attack and the Speaker of the Grand National Assembly, Mehmet Ali Şahin stated that "Turkey will not give up in its struggle against terrorism".

As a reaction to the attack, a group of Turkish civilians attacked district center of the Peace and Democracy Party. Police prevented the crowd from entering the building and no casualties occurred.

=== Alleged Israeli role ===
Vice President of the Felicity Party, Şevket Kazan, claimed that the attack was perpetrated by PKK members who were also agents working for the Mossad. The fact that attack took place 3 hours before the Gaza flotilla raid, in which 9 citizens of Turkey were killed by Israeli naval commandos created further controversy among the public.

== See also ==
- 2020 İskenderun bombing
