= Notre-Dame de Nice =

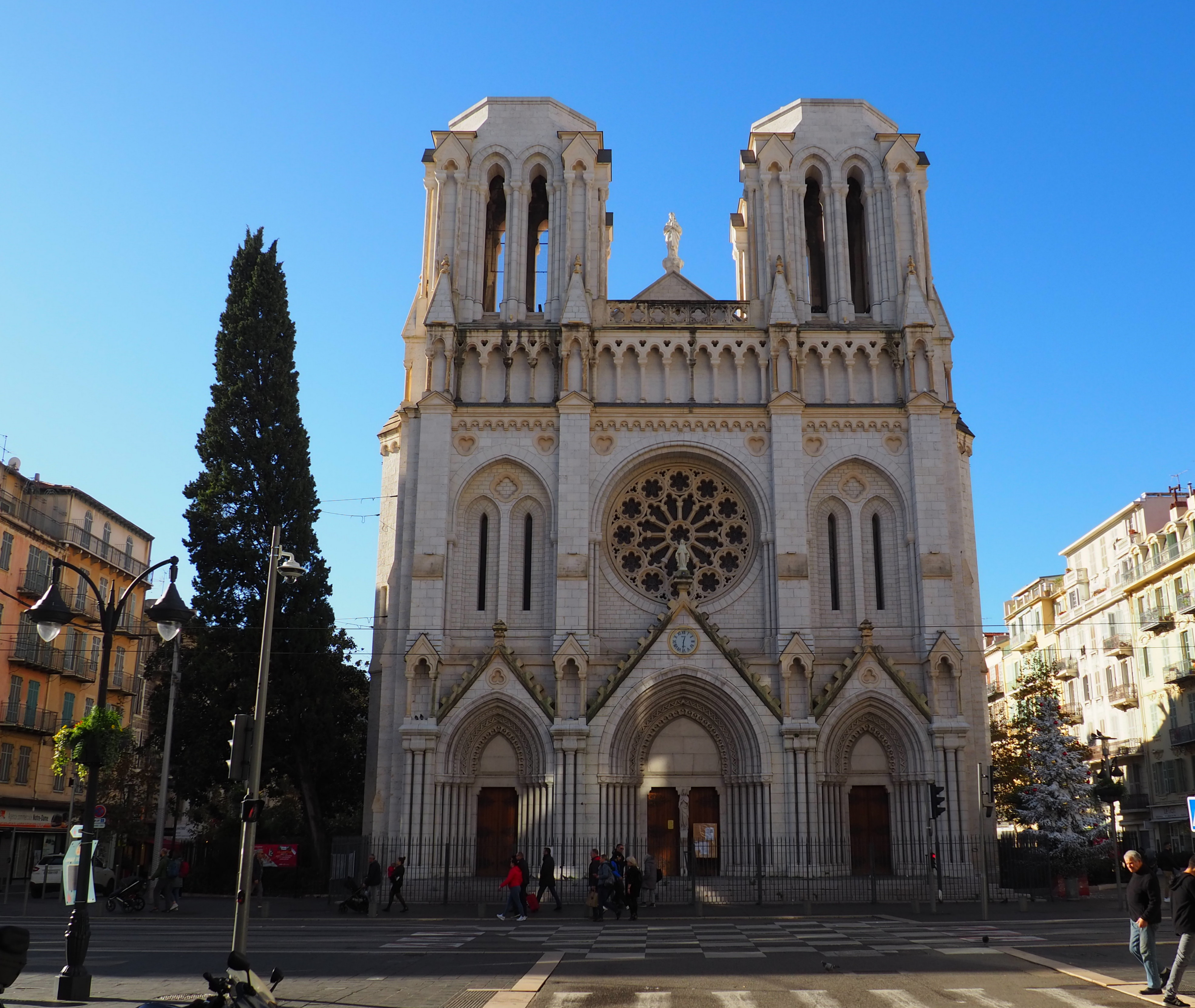
- Notre-Dame de Nice
- 43°42′11.92″N 7°15′57.82″E
- Location: Nice, Alpes-Maritimes
- Country: France
- Denomination: Roman Catholic
- Website: notredame-nice.com

Architecture
- Architect: Charles Lenormand
- Style: Neo Gothic
- Groundbreaking: 1864
- Completed: 1879

Administration
- Diocese: Roman Catholic Diocese of Nice

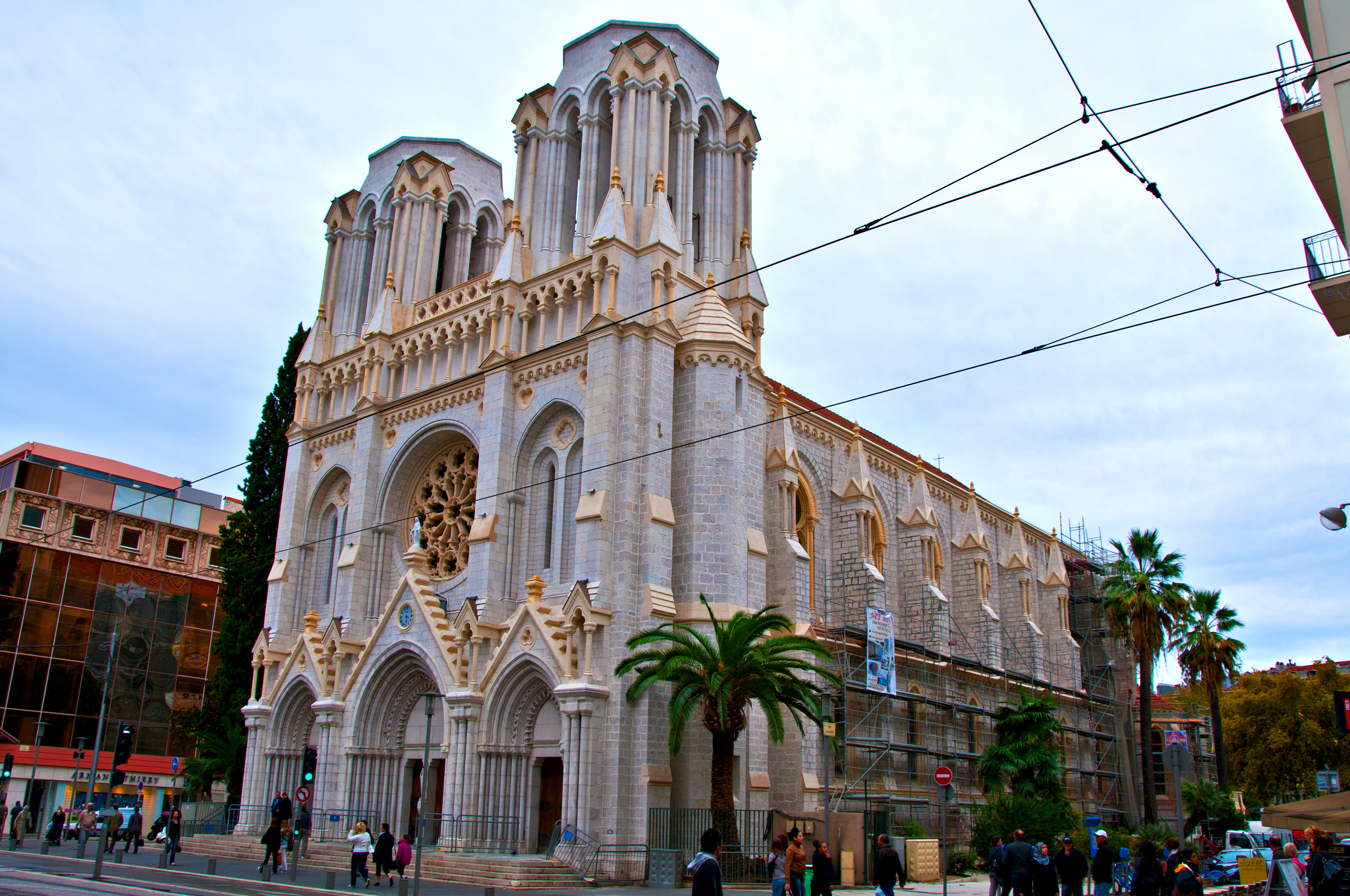
The towers of the basilica

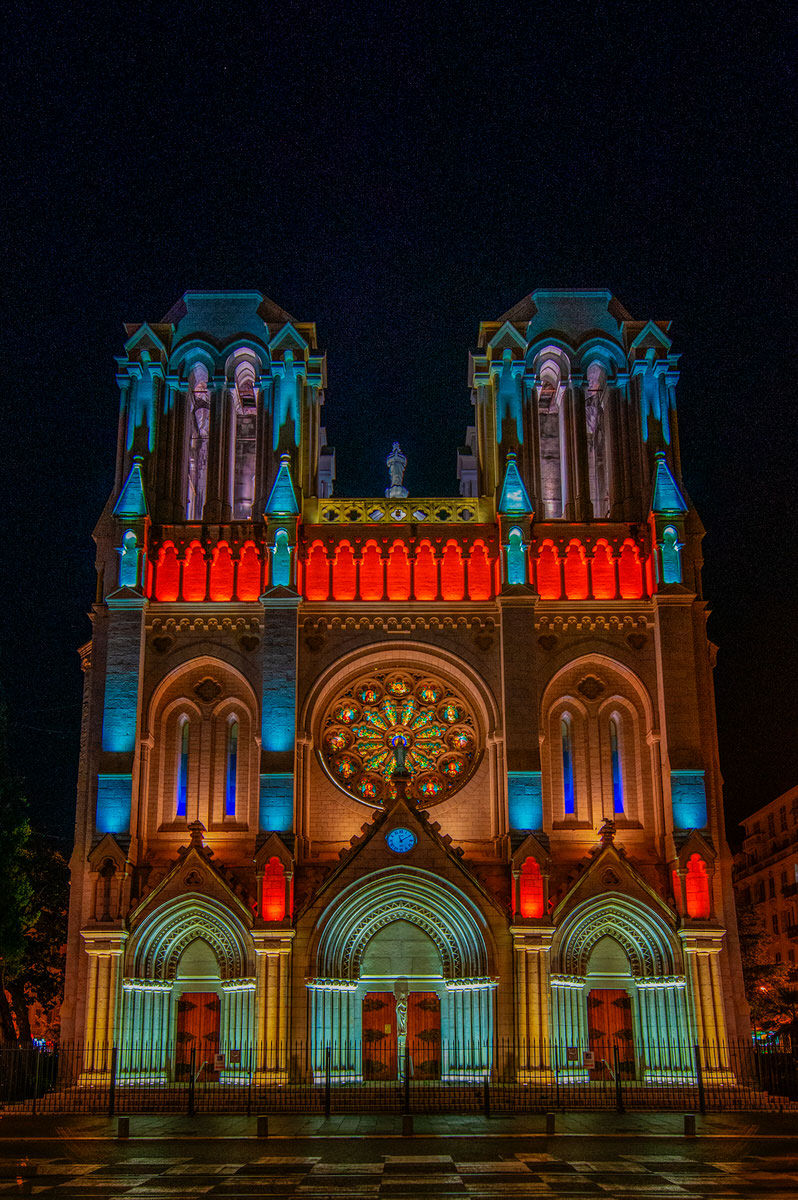
Notre Dame de Nice by night

The Basilica of Notre-Dame de Nice (French: Basilique Notre-Dame de Nice) is a Roman Catholic basilica situated on the Avenue Jean Médecin in the centre of Nice, in France. It is built in the Neo-Gothic architectural tradition.

The basilica, built between 1864 and 1868, was designed by Louis Lenormand and is the largest church in Nice, but is not the cathedral of the city.

Inspired by Angers Cathedral, it is built in the Gothic style. Its construction was motivated by a desire to add French architecture to the city following the acquisition of the County of Nice by France from the Kingdom of Sardinia; at the time Gothic buildings were considered to be characteristically French. Its most prominent features are two square towers 65 m high, which dominate the east front together with a large rose window featuring scenes of the Assumption of Mary.

On 29 October 2020, three people were killed at the church in an act of Islamic terrorism. The suspect was identified as a 21 year old Tunisian illegal immigrant, who had reportedly shouted "Allahu Akbar" while holding a Quran.

== Gallery ==
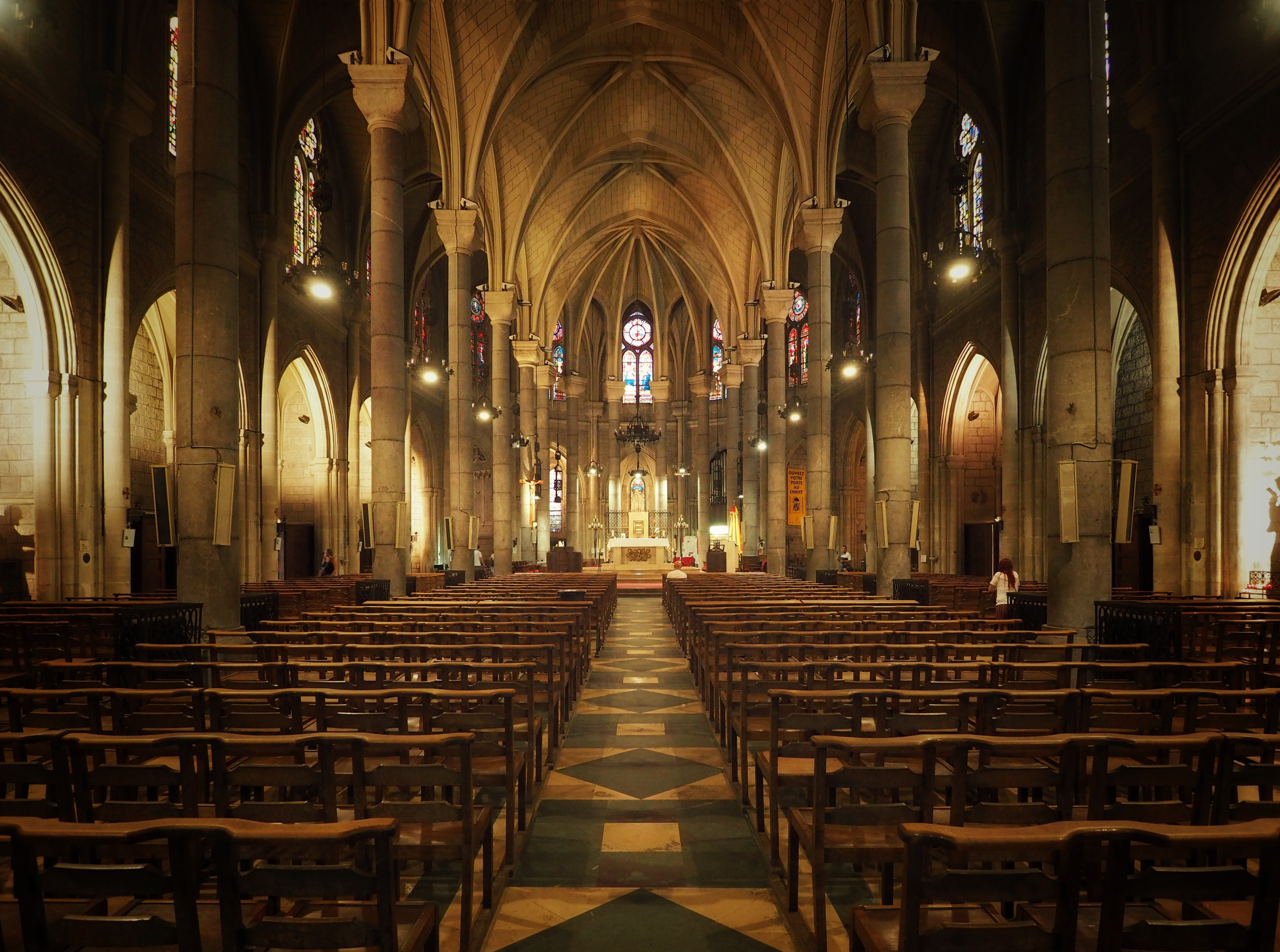
Nave

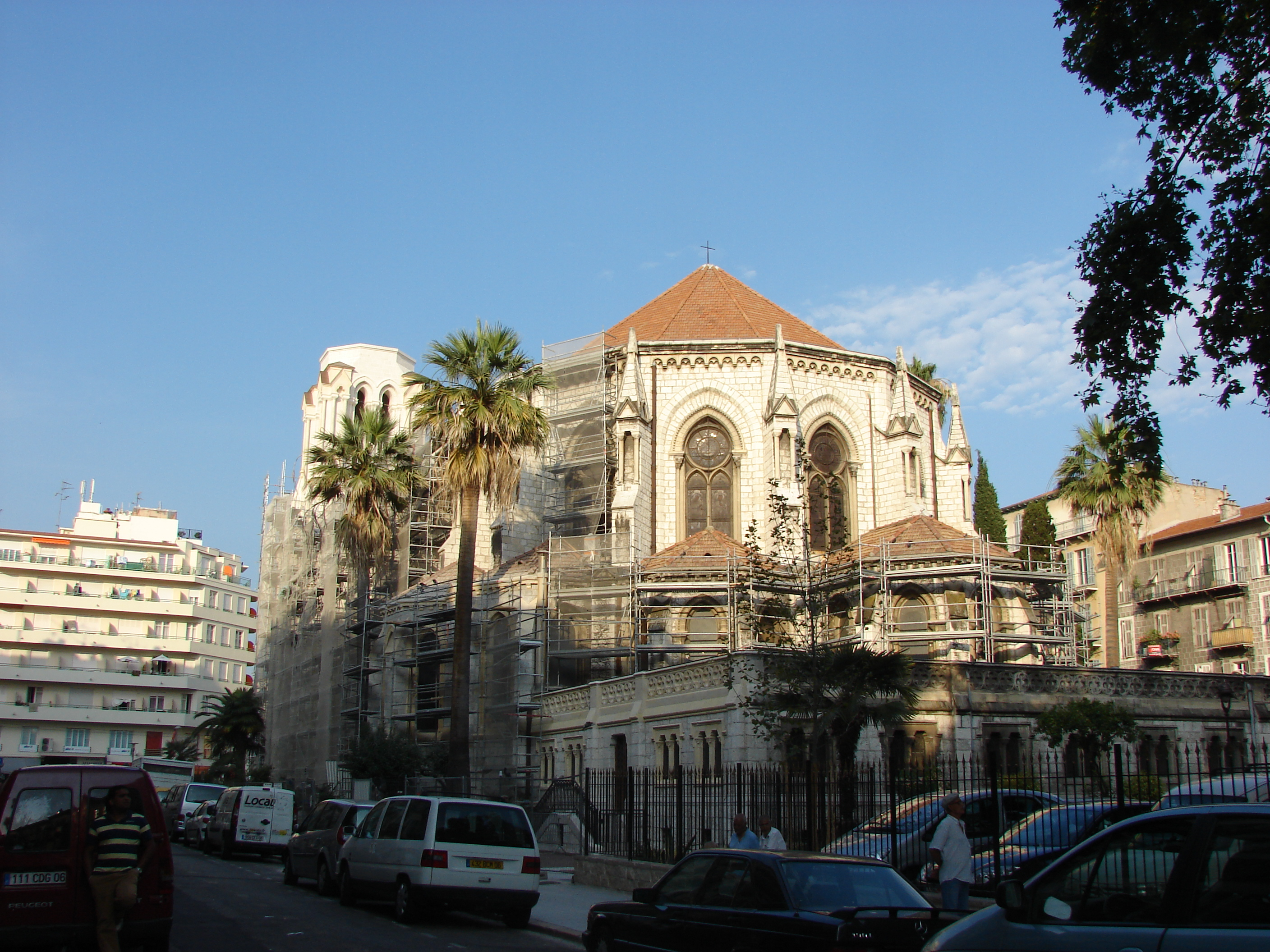
Chancel
