= 2020 Afrin bombing =

Terrorist attack in Syria

Coordinates: 36.5119°N 36.8694°E

- Part of the SDF insurgency in Northern Aleppo
- Location: Afrin, Aleppo Governorate, Syria
- Date: 28 April 2020
- Target: Marketplace
- Attack type: Truck bombing, mass murder
- Deaths: 53
- Injuries: 50+
- Perpetrators: Unknown / not claimed YPG (Turkish claim); SNA infighting (SDF claim)

The 2020 Afrin bombing was a truck bombing in the city of Afrin, Syria. The bombing occurred on 28 April 2020 and killing 53 people and injuring a least another 50.

== Bombing ==
On the afternoon of 28 April 2020, a truck bombing occurred a few meters away from the governor's residence in Raju street in Afrin, Aleppo Governorate. A bomb in a tank truck was detonated at an open-air market in Souk Ali in the city centre. According to the governor of the neighbouring Hatay province, across the Turkish border, the explosion was believed to have been caused by the rigging of a fuel tanker with hand grenades. The attack killed at least 53 civilians (including 11 children) and 12 Turkish-backed fighters, and injured over 50 others. Many people, alongside those who got trapped in their cars were burnt to death as a result of the blast, Syrian activists disclosed.

== Responsibility ==
The Turkish government immediately blamed the People's Protection Units (YPG). The Syrian Democratic Council and the commander-in-chief of the Syrian Democratic Forces, Mazloum Abdi, condemned the bombing and blamed Turkish policy, pointing out that "gangs armed by Turkey" had been involved in similar attacks.

According to the German Marxist newspaper Junge Welt, the nature of the attack and recent tensions suggests a jihadist group. Clashes between jihadist militias regularly take place in the Afrin and Idlib regions. Significant tensions have recently re-emerged between Hayat Tahrir al-Sham (HTS), the main rebel jihadist force in Idlib, and the Turkish government. HTS has accused Ankara of treason since the Russian-Turkish ceasefire agreed in early March 2020. The week prior to the Afrin bombing, the militiamen destroyed a Turkish tank while the Turkish Air Force allegedly destroyed a HTS base by drone.
