= 2020 Paris stabbing attack =

Islamist terror attack at former satirical magazine headquarters

- Location: 48.8556°N 2.37°E; 10 Rue Nicolas-Appert, 11th arrondissement of Paris, France
- Date: 25 September 2020
- Attack type: Stabbing, terrorist attack
- Weapon: Knife
- Deaths: 0
- Injuries: 2
- Motive: Islamic extremism, jihadism

On 25 September 2020, two people were injured in a stabbing outside the former headquarters of the French satirical magazine Charlie Hebdo in Paris. The building had previously been the site of an Islamic terrorist attack in 2015.

The French Interior Minister Gérald Darmanin considered this to be "clearly an act of Islamist terrorism."

A man from Pakistan, suspected of carrying out the attacks, was arrested near the scene. He was later identified as Zaheer Hassan Mehmood. Six other suspects were subsequently arrested in Paris in connection with the attack. They were convicted and sentenced to prison terms reaching up to 30 years in 2025.

== Stabbing ==
The stabbings occurred in the 11th arrondissement of Paris, near the Boulevard Richard-Lenoir. The victims consisted of a man and a woman. Both were employees of the television production company Premières Lignes who were on a cigarette break and sustained serious injuries from a meat cleaver. The attacker fled to the Paris Metro but was arrested in the nearby Bastille neighbourhood with blood on his clothing. A suspicious package was found near the scene, but was found to be harmless. Nearby Paris Metro stations were closed while five schools were placed under a five-hour lockdown. A security cordon was established in the arrondissement.

== Response ==
Later that day, the site was visited by Prime Minister Jean Castex, Interior Minister Gérald Darmanin and Paris Mayor Anne Hidalgo, during which Castex reiterated the government's "firm commitment to combat terrorism by all possible means".

== Investigation ==
=== Main suspect ===
The main suspect was identified as Zaheer Hassan Mehmood, a 25-year-old Pakistani man, who is charged with "attempted murder in association with a terrorist enterprise." The suspect acknowledged having carried out the attack for religious reasons. He claimed to be 18 in order to be eligible for social welfare benefits.

Before the attack, he stated in a video that he was seeking vengeance against Charlie Hebdo for publishing caricatures of Islam's prophet Muhammad.

The suspect left his village in Punjab province in Pakistan in early 2018 and came to Europe, following his brothers and other young men from the village. According to Associated Press, villagers considered the suspect a hero for carrying out the Paris attack. The suspect's father championed his son's actions, but was warned by Pakistani police against speaking publicly.

In France, the suspect moved to Pantin, a working-class district with many immigrants from North Africa, Sub-Saharan Africa and Pakistan. He shared an apartment with several other Pakistanis above a Hookah bar.

During the course of the investigation, it was found that Mehmood had carried out the attack not knowing that Charlie Hebdo had moved to a secret location following the 2015 attack. He was also found to have been influenced by radical Pakistani Islamic preacher Khadim Hussain Rizvi. On 24 January 2025, Mahmood was convicted of attempted murder and terrorist conspiracy and sentenced to 30 years' imprisonment and expulsion from France upon his release. Mahmood apologised to the victims.

=== Accomplices ===
In December 2020, four Pakistanis aged 17 to 21 were found to have been in contact with the assailant by authorities and were taken into custody. Two were apprehended in the Gironde, a third in Caen and the fourth in the Paris region. According to authorities, they had "spread their ideology and one of them had expressed his hatred against France before the attack". The investigation had also found numerous messages published on the TikTok social media network where the suspects expressed their hatred towards Muhammad caricatures and "glorified" the assault by their compatriot.

On the same day as Mahmood's conviction, five of his accomplices were sentenced to between three and 12 years' imprisonment on terrorist conspiracy charges for supporting Mahmood.

== See also ==
- Charlie Hebdo shooting
- Murder of Samuel Paty
- 2020 Nice stabbing
