= 2020 İskenderun shootout =

Clash between Kurdish militants and police in İskenderun, Turkey

- Part of the Kurdish–Turkish conflict (2015-present)
- Location: İskenderun, Hatay Province, Turkey
- Date: 26 October 2020; 21:00 (EEST)
- Attack type: Shootout; Suicide bombing
- Deaths: 2 (two attackers)
- Injuries: 3
- Perpetrator: Kurdistan Workers' Party

The 2020 İskenderun shootout took place on 26 October 2020, when two Kurdistan Workers Party (PKK) militants fought the police in İskenderun, resulting in one of them being shot dead and the other one detonating explosives and killing himself.

== Background ==
İskenderun is a city in Turkey located in the Hatay Province. It is the second largest city in the province after Antakya, and is a port city located on the Mediterranean Sea.

The conflict between Turkey and the Kurdistan Workers' Party (PKK) (designated a terrorist organisation by Turkey, the United States, the European Union and NATO) has been active since 1984, primarily in the southeast of the country. More than 40,000 people have died as a result of the conflict.

== Bombing ==
On 26 October 2020, police forces wanted to stop a suspicious vehicle in Kozludere neighbourhood of Payas. 2 members of the PKK refused to stop as the police intended to control the vehicle, opened fire against the officers and tried to escape. Their car crashed when they were trying to escape, therefore they seized a civilian car and moved to İskenderun. They were caught by police in İskenderun and ambushed by them. One of them was shot dead, while the other one detonated the bomb on him, causing his death and injuring a police officer. The attack came days after the United States Embassy in Ankara warned of terrorist attacks and kidnappings against U.S. citizens and other foreign nationals.

== Aftermath ==
The Fener street, in which incident took place was closed to traffic after the incident. Many police forces and medical teams were stationed in region.

=== Damage ===
The injured police officer was taken to a hospital and by 30 October his health situation was good. Windows of the houses and workplaces near were broken and several cars including a police car was damaged as a result of the explosion. Because of the broken windows, 2 civilians were injured.

=== Investigation ===
An abandoned car near the crime scene was investigated and tracked by police. As a result, on 28 October, 5 people from Istanbul, Şanlıurfa, Adıyaman and Diyarbakır were arrested related to the attack, which the Turkish authorities blamed on the PKK. The PKK claimed responsibility for the attack 3 days after the bombing, and said that Turkish media reports of the incident included “disinformation“ but did not elaborate further.

=== Reactions ===
People living on the houses around the explosion scene reacted to the attack by hanging flags on their balconies.

The police announced that "they will not allow traitors who want to divide their nation and country" as a response to the attack.

Governor of Hatay Rahmi Doğan announced that there are no losses of life while there are several injured, none of them being in a life-threatening condition.

Other Turkish politicians including Fuat Oktay, Abdulhamit Gül and Mustafa Şentop also condemned the attack.

== See also ==
- 2010 İskenderun attack
