= Bulbul, Syria =

Bulbul بلبل
- Village
- Location within Syria
- Coordinates: 36°46′17.9″N 36°49′8.8″E
- Country: Syria
- Governorate: Aleppo
- District: Afrin
- Subdistrict: Bulbul

Population (2004 census)
  - Total: 1,742
- Time zone: UTC+3 (AST)

Bulbul (Arabic: بلبل) is a village in northern Syria, administratively part of the Aleppo Governorate, located northwest of Aleppo near the Turkish border. Nearby localities include Maydan Ikbis to the west, Rajo to the southwest and Maabatli to the south.

== Population ==
Bulbul is the administrative center of Nahiya Bulbul of the Afrin District.

According to the Syria Central Bureau of Statistics (CBS), Bulbul had a population of 1,742 in the 2004 census. The town is also the administrative center of the Bulbul nahiyah of the Afrin District, consisting of 34 villages with a combined population of 12,573.

As part of the ongoing Turkish demographic policies in its occupation of Northern Syria, while only 15 of the original Kurdish households remain in the town, 340 new families have been settled, all of them Syrian Turkmen.

== Etymology ==
The word bulbul derives from Arabic: بلبل, meaning nightingale in Arabic, Turkish, Persian, and Kurdish languages, although in English, bulbul refers to passerine birds of a different family.

== Syrian civil war ==
On 3 February 2018, armed clashes broke out in Bulbul and Rajo between the Syrian National Army (SNA) and the Syrian Democratic Forces’ Kurdish People's Protection Units (YPG) amidst the Turkish military intervention to capture the Kurdish-held city of Afrin. The village eventually came under the control of the Syrian National Army following support given to them by the Turkish Armed Forces.
