= Inab =

Inab اناب
- Village
- Location within Syria
- Coordinates: 36°31′5″N 36°57′13″E
- Country: Syria
- Governorate: Aleppo Governorate
- District: Afrin District
- Subdistrict: Afrin

Population (2004 census)
  - Total: 2,309
- Time zone: UTC+3 (AST)

Inab (Arabic: اناب, also called Nepa) is a village in northern Syria, administratively part of the Afrin District of the Aleppo Governorate, located northwest of Aleppo. Nearby localities include Jalbul, Aqiba and Deir Jamal to the south, Karzahayel, Afrin and Ain Dara to the west, Qatma to the north and Manaq, Kafr Kalbin and Kaljibrin to the east. According to the Syria Central Bureau of Statistics (CBS), Inab had a population of 2,309 in the 2004 census.

During the Crusades, in 1149, Nur ad-Din Zangi, achieved a decisive victory against the Crusader army of Raymond of Antioch, and the allied followers of Ali ibn-Wafa, in the Battle of Inab outside the town.

== Syrian civil war ==
The town came under the control of the Syrian National Army on March 10, 2018.

On May 9 2022, a fighter of the Levant Front was killed in clashes with Kurdish forces on the frontline at the village.
