= Burj Abdullah =

Burj Abdullah برج عبد الله
- Village
- Location within Syria
- Coordinates: 36°24′39″N 36°51′44″E
- Country: Syria
- Governorate: Aleppo
- District: Afrin
- Subdistrict: Afrin

Population (2004 census)
  - Total: 1,224
- Time zone: UTC+3 (AST)

Burj Abdullah (Arabic: برج عبد الله, Kurdish: Birca ‘Evdêl, Bircê) or Burj Abdallah is a village in northern Syria, administratively part of the Aleppo Governorate, located northwest of Aleppo. Nearby localities include Basuta and Afrin to the north, Kimar to the northeast, Nubl to the east, Barad to the southeast, Darat Izza to the south and Jindires to the west. According to the Syria Central Bureau of Statistics (CBS), Burj Abdullah had a population of 1,224 in the 2004 census. The village is inhabited by Kurds. On March 20, 2018, the village came under the control of the Syrian National Army.
