= Ain Dara =

Ain Dara, also spelled Ayn Dara, Ein Dara or Andara may refer to:

- Ain Dara (archaeological site), an Iron Age site near Aleppo, Syria
- Ain Dara, Aleppo Governorate, a village in the Aleppo Governorate, Syria
- Ayn Dara, Rif Dimashq Governorate, a village in Rif Dimashq Governorate, Syria
- Ain Dara, Lebanon, a town in the Mount Lebanon Governorate, Lebanon
