= Barad, Syria =

Barad براد
- Village
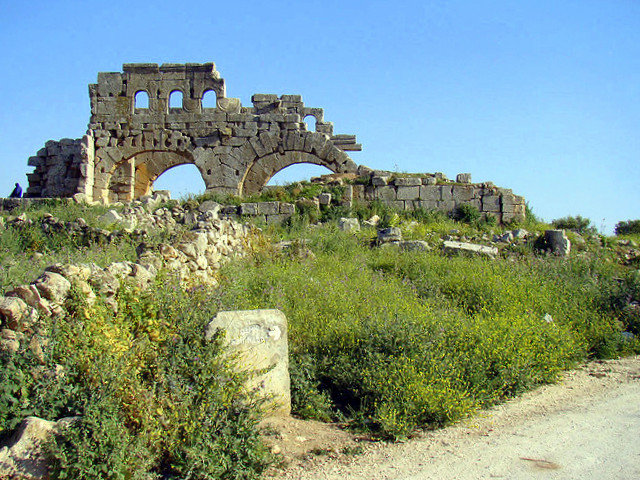
- Ruins of the North Church AD561 at the ancient site of Barad, 2009

- Location within Syria
- Coordinates: 36°23′8″N 36°53′57″E
- Country: Syria
- Governorate: Aleppo
- District: Afrin
- Subdistrict: Afrin

Population (2004 census)
  - Total: 1,229
- Time zone: UTC+3 (AST)

Barad (Arabic: براد) is a mountainous village in northern Syria, administratively part of the Aleppo Governorate, located northwest of Aleppo. Nearby localities include Burj Abdullah to the northwest, Kimar to the north, Aqiba to the northeast and Nubl to the east.

== Population ==
According to the Syria Central Bureau of Statistics (CBS), Barad had a population of 1,229 in the 2004 census. Although the vicinity of Barad is still populated, it is listed as one of the Dead Cities, a UNESCO World Heritage Site. It is the most extensive ancient site in the area with an important group of buildings dating from the Byzantine era.

== Archaeological remains ==
The archaeological remains in the vicinity of Barad include several old churches, an ancient monastery, a large public bathhouse, five warehouses, meeting house, a magistrate's residence, a tetrapylon, two monasteries and a cathedral. Most of these date from the Byzantine period.

The cathedral, known as the Church of Julianos, was built between 399 and 402 CE. It is a large building containing a sizable bema ("elevated position") in the center of the hall which represents the centrality of Jerusalem. At the end of its wall is a book rest. Of the seven churches that were built in northern Syria before 400 CE, the Church of Julianos was one of two large three-aisled basilicas; the other five were smaller, with only a single aisle.

A second church was built in Barad in the 6th century. The monastery, known as Qasr al-Barad, is situated about 1,200 metres (3,900 ft) southwest of the village site.

In February 2010, Lebanese Maronite Christian Michel Aoun led a delegation to visit Barad, in order to commemorate the 1600th anniversary of St. Maron's death.

On 22 March 2018, Barad was bombed by Turkish forces during the Operation Olive Branch. Several important structures were damaged or destroyed, including the tomb of St. Maron, and the Julianos Church.

== Bibliography ==
- Ball, Warwick (2001). Rome in the East. Psychology Press. ISBN 0415243572.
- Burns, Ross (2009). The Monuments of Syria. I. B. Tauris. ISBN 978-1845119478.
- Less, Jess (2010). Syria Handbook. Footprint Travel Guides. ISBN 978-1907263033.
- Richardson, Peter (2004). Building Jewish In The Roman East. Baylor University Press. ISBN 1932792015.
- Trombley, Frank R. (2001). Hellenic Religion and Christianization, C. 370-529. Vol. 2. BRILL. ISBN 0391041215.
- Milburn, Robert (1998). Early Christian Art and Architecture. University of California Press. ISBN 9780520074125.
- Verlag, Nelles (1999). Syria Lebanon (Nelles Guides). Hunter Publishing, Inc. ISBN 3886181057.
- Wilkinson, John (2002). From Synagogue to Church: The Traditional Design: Its Beginning, its Definition, its End. Psychology Press. ISBN 0700713204.
