= Oqayba =

Aqîbê عقيبة
- Village
- Location within Syria
- Coordinates: 36°26′19″N 36°58′2″E
- Country: Syria
- Governorate: Aleppo
- District: Afrin
- Subdistrict: Afrin

Government
  - Type: Municipal Council

Area
  - Total: 6 km^{2} (2.3 sq mi)
  - Land: 6 km^{2} (2.3 sq mi)
  - Water: 0 km^{2} (0 sq mi) 0%

Population (2015 census)
  - Total: 5,600
- Time zone: UTC+3 (AST)

Aqîbê (Arabic: عقيبة of Oqayba, also spelled Aqiba, Akibah or Agiba) is a town in northern Syria, administratively part of the Aleppo Governorate, located northwest of Aleppo. Nearby localities include Afrin and Baselhaya to the northwest, Ibbin, Deir Jamal and Tell Rifaat to the northeast, Nubl to the south, Barad to the southwest and Kimar to the west. According to the Rojava Central Bureau of Statistics, Aqîbê had a population of 5600 in the 2015 census. Aqîbê has been under Kurdish control since March 2013.

== Syrian Civil War ==
On 13 June 2023, 3 Syrian soldiers were killed by a Turkish drone strike on Syrian military positions in the vicinity of the village.
