= Maryamin, Afrin =

Maryamin مريمين
- Village
- Location of Maryamin in Syria
- Coordinates: 36°31′44″N 36°56′54″E
- Country: Syria
- Governorate: Aleppo
- District: Afrin
- Subdistrict: Afrin
- Elevation: 549 m (1,801 ft)

Population (2004)
  - Total: 810
- Time zone: UTC+3 (AST)
- Geocode: C1386

Maryamin (Arabic: مريمين, also spelled Mariamein, Maryamayn, Mreimin Afrin or Maryamayn Afrin) is a village in northwestern Aleppo Governorate northwestern Syria. Administratively, the village belongs to Nahiya Afrin in Afrin District. Nearby localities include Jalbul to the south, Afrin to the west, Qatma to the north and A'zaz to the east. In the 2004 census, Maryamin had a population of 810. The village is inhabited by Turkmen.

Maryamin was noted as "a celebrated village of Aleppo inhabited by Turkomans" by the 13th-century Syrian geographer Yaqut al-Hamawi.
