= Xalta, Afrin =

Xalta
- خالدية
- Country: Syria
- Governorate: Aleppo
- District: Afrin
- Nahiyah: Afrin
- Time zone: UTC+3

Xalta (Arabic: خالدية, Kurdish: Xalta) is a Kurdish village administratively part of the Afrin Subdistrict, Afrin District, Aleppo Governorate, in northwestern Syria. The village had a population of 26 according to the 2004 census, and 279 according to civil registry records at the end of 2005.
