= Afrin Subdistrict =

Afrin Subdistrict ناحية مركز عفرين Nahiye Efrînê
- Subdistrict
- Location of Afrin Subdistrict within Aleppo Governorate

- Location in Syria
- Coordinates (Afrin): 36.53°N 36.87°E
- Country: Syria
- Governorate: Aleppo
- District: Afrin
- Seat: Afrin

Area
  - Total: 427.73 km^{2} (165.15 sq mi)

Population (2004)
  - Total: 66,188
  - Density: 154.74/km^{2} (400.78/sq mi)
- Geocode: SY020300

Afrin Subdistrict (Arabic: ناحية مركز عفرين, romanized: nāḥiyah ʿAfrīn, Kurdish: Nahiye Efrînê) is a subdistrict of Afrin District in northwestern Aleppo Governorate of northern Syria. The administrative centre is the city of Afrin.

At the 2004 census, the subdistrict had a population of 66,188.

== Populated places ==
Cities, towns and villages of Afrin Subdistrict
PCode	Name	Population
C1366	Afrin	36,562
C1376	Basuta	2,389
C1353	Bênê	1,142
C1367	Inab	2,309
C1387	Kurzêlê	1,548
C1378	Gezîwê	1,413
C1375	Barad	1,229
C1377	Burj Abdullah	1,224
C1384	Maratê	1,134
C1365	Coqê	1,131
C1352	Îska	1,116
C1356	Shwarghat al-Joz	1,095
C1361	Oqayba	1,040
C1358	Zaretê	1,009
C1374	Basufan	901
C1386	Maryamin	810
C1362	al-Hawa	743
C1389	Keferzît	727
C1359	Şadêrê	714
C1363	Turindê	706
C1382	Kimar	660
C1379	Zahrat al-Hiyat	654
C1373	Baai	626
C1354	Burj Hayder	616
C1380	Kibêşîn	583
C1371	Basselhaya	512
C1383	Fafertin	507
C1360	Cilbir	461
C1357	Şewarga	383
C1369	Soganekê	311
C1385	Keferşîl	271
C1370	Ain Dara	248
C1390	Kifêrê	213
—N/a	Tir Tewîlê	211
C1355	Tilfê	200
C1381	Kokebê	173
C1351	Bablîtê	164
C1368	Xelnêrê	122
—N/a	Gundî Mezin	109
C1388	Keferbetrê	63
C1372	Pitêtê	54
—N/a	Gazê	51
—N/a	Cûmkê	28
C1364	Xalta	26
