= Gundî Mezin, Afrin =

Gundî Mezin
- الكبيرة
- Country: Syria
- Governorate: Aleppo
- District: Afrin
- Nahiyah: Afrin
- Time zone: UTC+3

Gundî Mezin (Arabic: الكبيرة, Kurdish: Gundî Mezin) is a Kurdish village administratively part of the Afrin Subdistrict, Afrin District, Aleppo Governorate, in northwestern Syria. The village had a population of 109 according to the 2004 census, and 790 according to civil registry records at the end of 2005.

== Name ==
The name Gundî Mezin means "the large village" in Kurdish, reflecting its historical importance as one of the major villages in the region in the 18th century. During the period of Turkification, the name was translated into Turkish as Büyük Oba, meaning "the large community", according to Dr. Muhammad.
