= Coqê, Afrin =

Coqê
- الخضراء
- Country: Syria
- Governorate: Aleppo
- District: Afrin
- Nahiyah: Afrin
- Time zone: UTC+3

Coqê (Arabic: الخضراء, romanized: Al-Khadra, Kurdish: Coqê), formerly known as Juwayq, is a Kurdish village administratively part of the Afrin Subdistrict, Afrin District, Aleppo Governorate, in northwestern Syria. The village had a population of 1,131 according to the 2004 census, and 5,479 according to civil registry records at the end of 2005.
