= Cûmkê, Afrin =

Cûmkê
- الجميلة
- Country: Syria
- Governorate: Aleppo
- District: Afrin
- Nahiyah: Afrin
- Time zone: UTC+3

Cûmkê (Arabic: الجميلة, Kurdish: Cûmkê) is a Kurdish village administratively part of the Afrin Subdistrict, Afrin District, Aleppo Governorate, in northwestern Syria. The village had a population of 28 according to the 2004 census, and 479 according to civil registry records at the end of 2005.
