= Bablîtê, Afrin =

Bablîtê
- بابليت
- Country: Syria
- Governorate: Aleppo
- District: Afrin
- Nahiyah: Afrin
- Time zone: UTC+3

Bablîtê (Arabic: بابليت, Kurdish: Bablîtê) is a Kurdish village administratively part of the Afrin Subdistrict, Afrin District, Aleppo Governorate, in northwestern Syria. The village had a population of 164 according to the 2004 census, and 2,251 according to civil registry records at the end of 2005.
