= Gezîwê, Afrin =

Gezîwê
- غزاوية
- Interactive map of Gezîwê
- Country: Syria
- Governorate: Aleppo
- District: Afrin
- Nahiyah: Afrin
- Time zone: UTC+3
- Geocode: C1378

Gezîwê (Arabic: غزاوية, Kurdish: Gezîwê) is a Kurdish village administratively part of the Afrin Subdistrict, Afrin District, Aleppo Governorate, in northwestern Syria. The village had a population of 1,413 according to the 2004 census, and 2,176 according to civil registry records at the end of 2005. Half of its inhabitants are followers of Yazidism.
