= Turindê, Afrin =

Turindê
- الظريفة
- Interactive map of Turindê
- Country: Syria
- Governorate: Aleppo
- District: Afrin
- Nahiyah: Afrin
- Time zone: UTC+3
- Geocode: C1363

Turindê (Arabic: الظريفة, Kurdish: Turindê) is a Kurdish village administratively part of the Afrin Subdistrict, Afrin District, Aleppo Governorate, in northwestern Syria. The village had a population of 706 according to the 2004 census, and 3,330 according to civil registry records at the end of 2005.
