= Soganekê, Afrin =

Soganekê
- البصلية
- Interactive map of Soganekê
- Country: Syria
- Governorate: Aleppo
- District: Afrin
- Nahiyah: Afrin
- Time zone: UTC+3

Soganekê or Al-Basliya (Kurdish: Soganekê, Arabic: البصلية) and formerly Soganê is a Kurdish village, part of Afrin Subdistrict, Afrin District, Aleppo Governorate, in northwestern Syria. The village had a population of 311 according to the 2004 census, and 935 according to civil registry records at the end of 2005. Its inhabitants were Yazidis until the early 20th century.

== Name ==
The village's name is derived from the Soganê Yazidi Kurdish tribe, which belongs to the Qatani group within the Yazidi hierarchical order, according to Muhammad Abdo Ali and Khalil Jundi.
