= Kibêşîn, Afrin =

Kibêşîn
- كباشين
- Country: Syria
- Governorate: Aleppo
- District: Afrin
- Nahiyah: Afrin
- Time zone: UTC+3

Kibêşîn (Arabic: كباشين, Kurdish: Kibêşîn) is a Kurdish village administratively part of the Afrin Subdistrict, Afrin District, Aleppo Governorate, in northwestern Syria. The village had a population of 583 according to the 2004 census, and 953 according to civil registry records at the end of 2005.
