= Maratê, Afrin =

Maratê
- معراتة
- Country: Syria
- Governorate: Aleppo
- District: Afrin
- Nahiyah: Afrin
- Time zone: UTC+3

Maratê (Arabic: معراتة, Kurdish: Maratê) is a Kurdish village administratively part of the Afrin Subdistrict, Afrin District, Aleppo Governorate, in northwestern Syria. The village had a population of 1,134 according to the 2004 census, and 4,671 according to civil registry records at the end of 2005.
