= Tir Tewîlê, Afrin =

Tir Tewîlê
- تل طويل
- Interactive map of Tir Tewîlê
- Country: Syria
- Governorate: Aleppo
- District: Afrin
- Nahiyah: Afrin
- Time zone: UTC+3

Tir Tewîlê (Arabic: تل طويل, Kurdish: Tir Tewîlê) is a Kurdish village administratively part of the Afrin Subdistrict, Afrin District, Aleppo Governorate, in northwestern Syria. The village had a population of 211 according to the 2004 census, and 1,160 according to civil registry records at the end of 2005.
