= Keferzît, Afrin =

Keferzît
- كفر زيد
- Country: Syria
- Governorate: Aleppo
- District: Afrin
- Nahiyah: Afrin
- Time zone: UTC+3

Keferzît (Arabic: كفر زيد, Kurdish: Keferzît) is a Kurdish village administratively part of the Afrin Subdistrict, Afrin District, Aleppo Governorate, in northwestern Syria. The village had a population of 727 according to the 2004 census, and 1,266 according to civil registry records at the end of 2005.
