= Şewarga, Afrin =

Şewarga
- شوارغة الأرز
- Country: Syria
- Governorate: Aleppo
- District: Afrin
- Nahiyah: Afrin
- Time zone: UTC+3

Şewarga (Arabic: شوارغة الأرز, Kurdish: Şewarga) is a Kurdish village administratively part of the Afrin Subdistrict, Afrin District, Aleppo Governorate, in northwestern Syria. The village had a population of 383 according to the 2004 census.
