= Şadêrê, Afrin =

Şadêrê
- شيخ الدير
- Country: Syria
- Governorate: Aleppo
- District: Afrin
- Nahiyah: Afrin
- Time zone: UTC+3

Şadêrê (Arabic: شيخ الدير, Kurdish: Şadêrê) is a Kurdish village administratively part of the Afrin Subdistrict, Afrin District, Aleppo Governorate, in northwestern Syria. The village had a population of 714 according to the 2004 census, and 1,305 according to civil registry records at the end of 2005.
