= Cilbir, Afrin =

Cilbir
- جلبل
- Interactive map of Cilbir
- Country: Syria
- Governorate: Aleppo
- District: Afrin
- Nahiyah: Afrin
- Time zone: UTC+3

Cilbir (Arabic: جلبل, Kurdish: Cilbir) is a Kurdish village administratively part of the Afrin Subdistrict, Afrin District, Aleppo Governorate, in northwestern Syria. The village had a population of 461 according to the 2004 census, and 1,547 according to civil registry records at the end of 2005. The village is considered a centre of the Kurdish Rubari tribe.
