= Keferşîl, Afrin =

Keferşîl
- كفرشيل
- Interactive map of Keferşîl
- Country: Syria
- Governorate: Aleppo
- District: Afrin
- Nahiyah: Afrin
- Time zone: UTC+3

Keferşîl (Arabic: كفرشيل, Kurdish: Keferşîl) is a Kurdish village administratively part of the Afrin Subdistrict, Afrin District, Aleppo Governorate, in northwestern Syria. The village had a population of 271 according to the 2004 census, and 997 according to civil registry records at the end of 2005.
