= Xelnêrê, Afrin =

Village in Syria

Xelnêrê
- النيرة
- Interactive map of Xelnêrê
- Country: Syria
- Governorate: Aleppo
- District: Afrin
- Nahiyah: Afrin
- Time zone: UTC+3

Xelnêrê (Arabic: النيرة, Kurdish: Xelnêrê / Xelnêr) is a Kurdish village administratively part of the Afrin Subdistrict, Afrin District, Aleppo Governorate, in northwestern Syria. The village had a population of 122 according to the 2004 census, and 1,196 according to civil registry records at the end of 2005.
