= Bênê, Afrin =

Bênê
- أبين
- Interactive map of Bênê
- Country: Syria
- Governorate: Aleppo
- District: Afrin
- Nahiyah: Afrin
- Time zone: UTC+3
- Geocode: C1353

Bênê or Abeen (Kurdish: Bênê, Arabic: أبين) is a Kurdish village administratively part of the Afrin Subdistrict, Afrin District, Aleppo Governorate, in northwestern Syria. It lies approximately 25 kilometres from the subdistrict centre and sits at an elevation of 485 metres above sea level. The village had a population of 1,142 according to the 2004 census, and 4,051 according to civil registry records at the end of 2005. It is one of the villages of the Kurdish Rubari tribe.
