= Pitêtê, Afrin =

Pitêtê
- بتيتة
- Country: Syria
- Governorate: Aleppo
- District: Afrin
- Nahiyah: Afrin
- Time zone: UTC+3

Pitêtê (Arabic: بتيتة, Kurdish: Pitêtê) is a Kurdish village administratively part of the Afrin Subdistrict, Afrin District, Aleppo Governorate, in northwestern Syria. The village had a population of 54 according to the 2004 census, and 288 according to civil registry records at the end of 2005.
