= Kimar =

Kimar may refer to:

- Kimar (company), a subdivision of Chiappa Firearms
- Kimar, Syria, a locality in northwest Syria
