= Jalamah, Afrin =

Jalamah جلمة
- Town
- Jalamah
- Location within Syria
- Coordinates: 36°21′26″N 36°46′13″E
- Country: Syria
- Governorate: Aleppo Governorate
- District: Afrin District
- Subdistrict: Jindires
- Time zone: UTC+2 (EET)
  - Summer (DST): UTC+3 (EEST)

Jalamah, also spelled as Djélémé or Jalmé (Arabic: جلمة) is a town in northern Syria situated in Afrin District. It is located on the southern edge of the Afrin plain, 60 kilometres (37 mi) northwest by road from Aleppo and 19 kilometres (12 mi) southwest of Afrin. Nearby localities include Jindires to the northwest, Askê to the east and Afrin to the northeast. The village is inhabited by Turkmen. On March 11, 2018, the town came under the control of the Syrian National Army.
