= Kurzêlê, Afrin =

Kurzêlê
- قرزيحل
- Interactive map of Kurzêlê
- Country: Syria
- Governorate: Aleppo
- District: Afrin
- Nahiyah: Afrin
- Time zone: UTC+3
- Geocode: C1387

Kurzêlê or Kurzêlê Cûmê (Arabic: قرزيحل, Kurdish: Kurzêlê Cûmê) is a Kurdish village administratively part of the Afrin Subdistrict, Afrin District, Aleppo Governorate, in northwestern Syria. The village had a population of 1,548 according to the 2004 census, and 3,611 according to civil registry records at the end of 2005.
