= Tilfê, Afrin =

Tilfê
- تللف
- Interactive map of Tilfê
- Country: Syria
- Governorate: Aleppo
- District: Afrin
- Nahiyah: Afrin
- Time zone: UTC+3

Tilfê (Arabic: تللف, Kurdish: Tilfê) is a Kurdish village administratively part of the Afrin Subdistrict, Afrin District, Aleppo Governorate, in northwestern Syria. The village had a population of 200 according to the 2004 census, and 811 according to civil registry records at the end of 2005.
