= Keferbetrê, Afrin =

Keferbetrê
- كفر بطرة
- Country: Syria
- Governorate: Aleppo
- District: Afrin
- Nahiyah: Afrin
- Time zone: UTC+3

Keferbetrê (Arabic: كفر بطرة, Kurdish: Keferbetrê) is a Kurdish village administratively part of the Afrin Subdistrict, Afrin District, Aleppo Governorate, in northwestern Syria. The village had a population of 63 according to the 2004 census, and 282 according to civil registry records at the end of 2005. It is one of the villages of the Kurdish Rubari tribe.
