= Basufan =

Basufan باصوفان
- Village
- Location within Syria
- Coordinates: 36°20′23″N 36°52′30″E
- Country: Syria
- Governorate: Aleppo
- District: Afrin
- Nahiyah: Afrin

Population (2004 census)
  - Total: 901
- Time zone: UTC+3 (AST)

Basufan (Arabic: باصوفان; Kurdish: Basûfan) (sometimes spelled Bassoûfâne, Bassoufane, Bosoufane, Bāşūfān) is an ancient village located in northwestern Syria. The village is populated by Yazidis and had a population of 901 in the 2004 census according to the Syria Central Bureau of Statistics (CBS), and had a population of 2,059 according to the civil registry records at the end of 2005.

The village is notable for being the site of a former fifth-century church dedicated to Saint Phocas.

== Location ==
The village of Basufan is located in Aleppo Governorate, about 30 kilometers northwest of the city of Aleppo. It is built at an altitude of 632 meters, and is located to the east of Mount Simeon.

== Description ==
The village hosts several vestiges of the Byzantine-era settlement which are dated between the fifth and the seventh centuries. Howard Crosby Butler, in 1905, at the head of an archaeological expedition from the American University of Princeton, mentioned a large Islamic cemetery located around the ancient church. He also mentioned having found the remains of another church, older and completely destroyed. The church dedicated to Saint Phocas was probably part of a monastic complex. The same year, Gertrude Bell crossed Basufan and found the village mainly inhabited by Kurds, who rented their houses during the hot summer months to Christians and Jews of Aleppo who had come on vacation.

== Church of St. Phocas ==
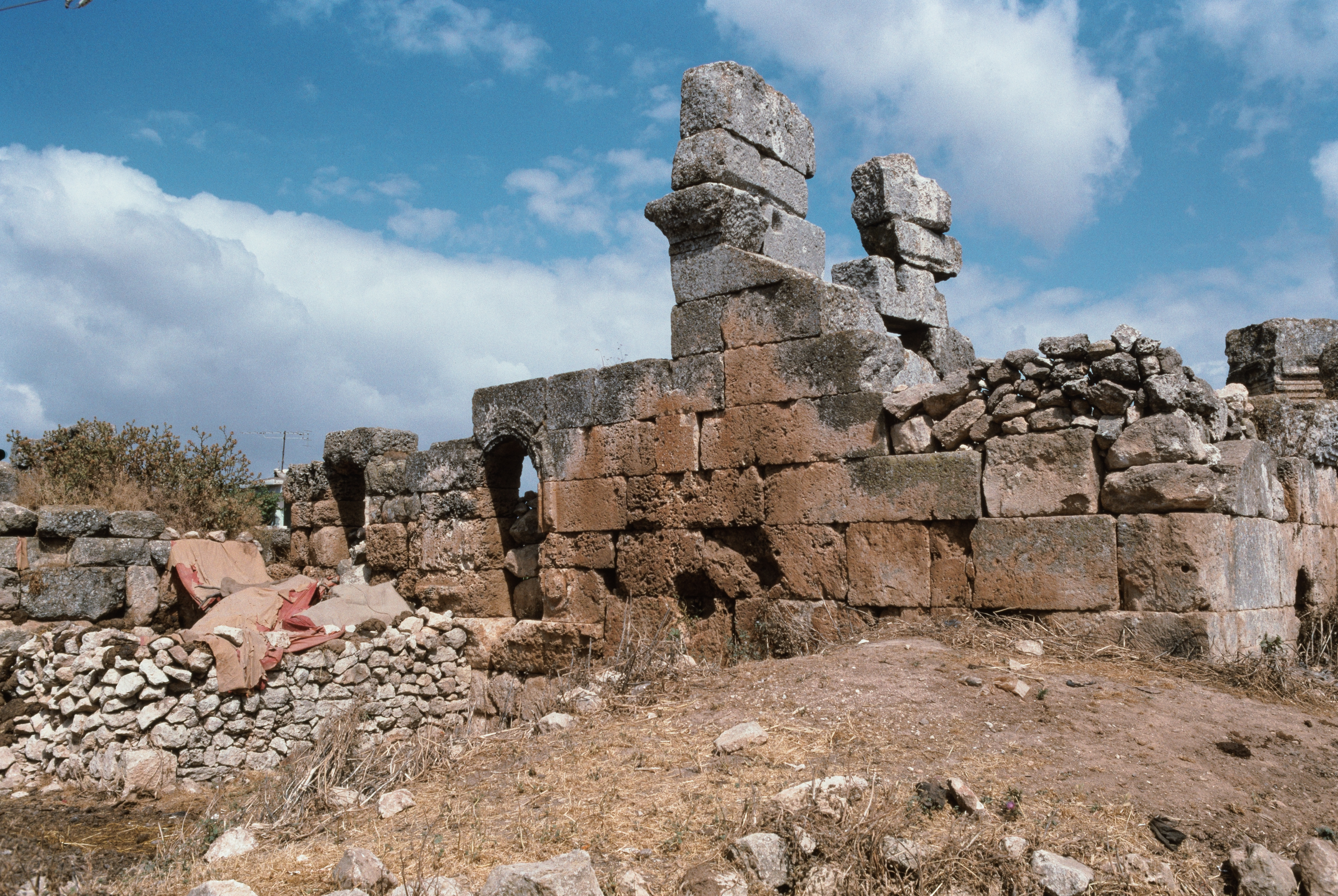
South façade of the Church of Saint Phocas. Photo by Frank Kidner.

St. Phocas Church, now in ruins, was a basilica with three naves separated by columns. According to an inscription on the south wall, the building was dedicated to Saint Phocas and erected in 491-492.

The nave was 24 meters long and 15.4 wide. The arches of the nave rested on columns, while the outer walls were reinforced by pilasters. To the east, the chevet was composed of two rectangular apses framing a semicircular central apse. The two rectangular apses connected to the lateral aisles, and the south room was also open to the central apse, serving as a martyrium. The building bore a resemblance to the church of Qal'at Sem'an which could result from an imitation of the architecture of the latter. Access to the nave was through a door in the middle of the south façade, and a second access was on the west gable.

== Photographs by Gertrude Bell ==
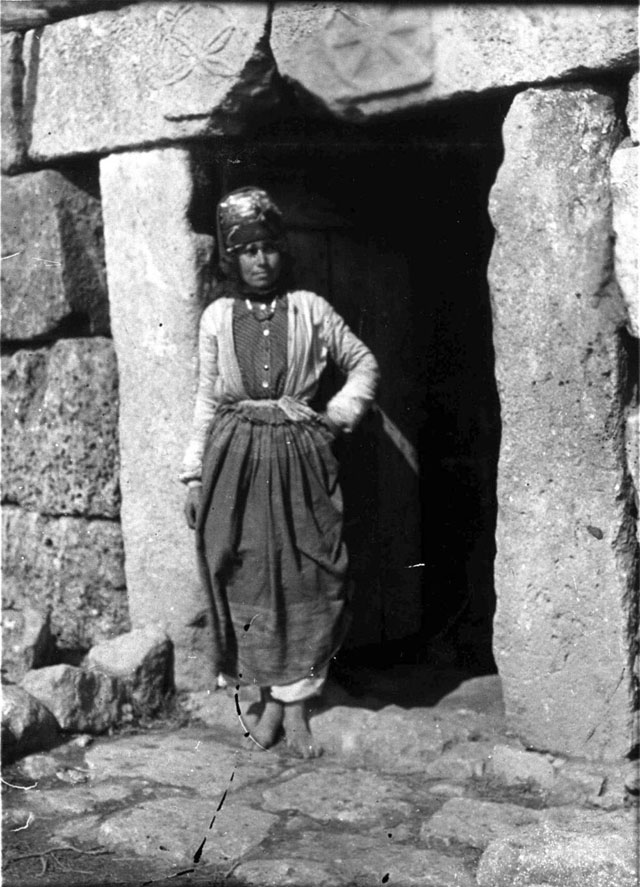
Kurdish girl standing in doorway.

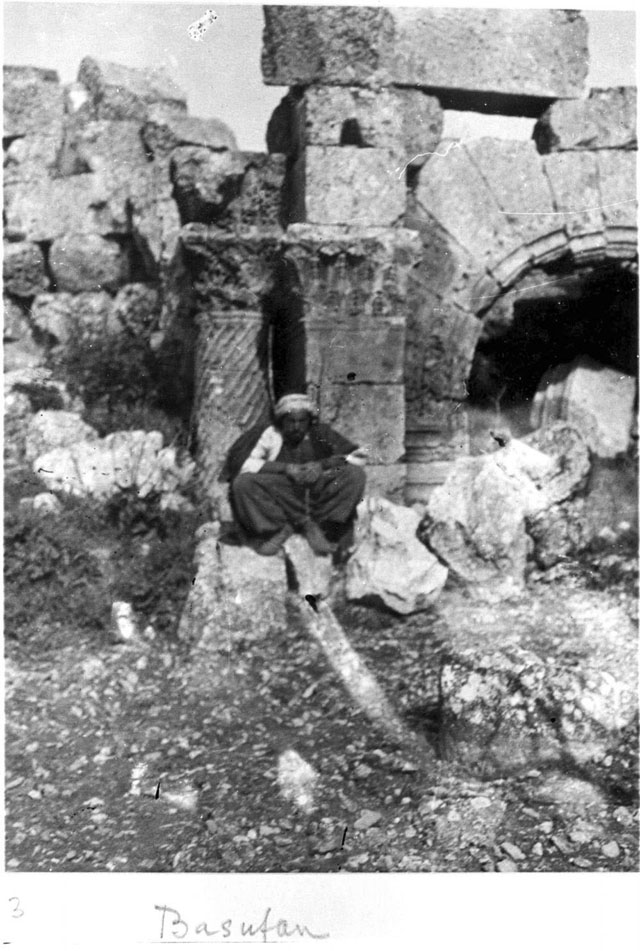
Kurdish man in front of the church apse. Twisted column, Corinthian capital.

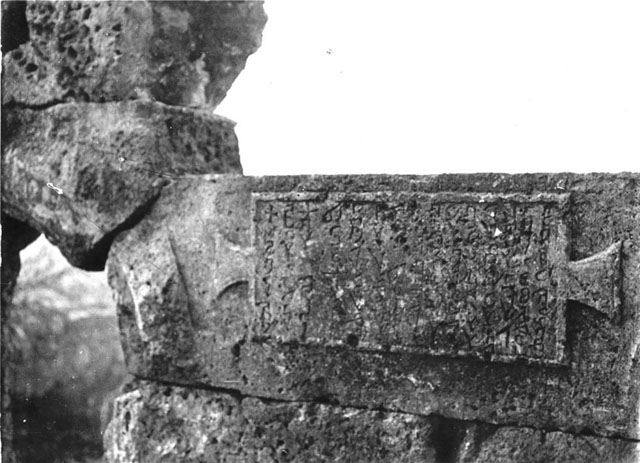
Inscription in Syriac.
