= Ain Dara (archaeological site) =

Archaeological site in Syria

Ain Dara temple
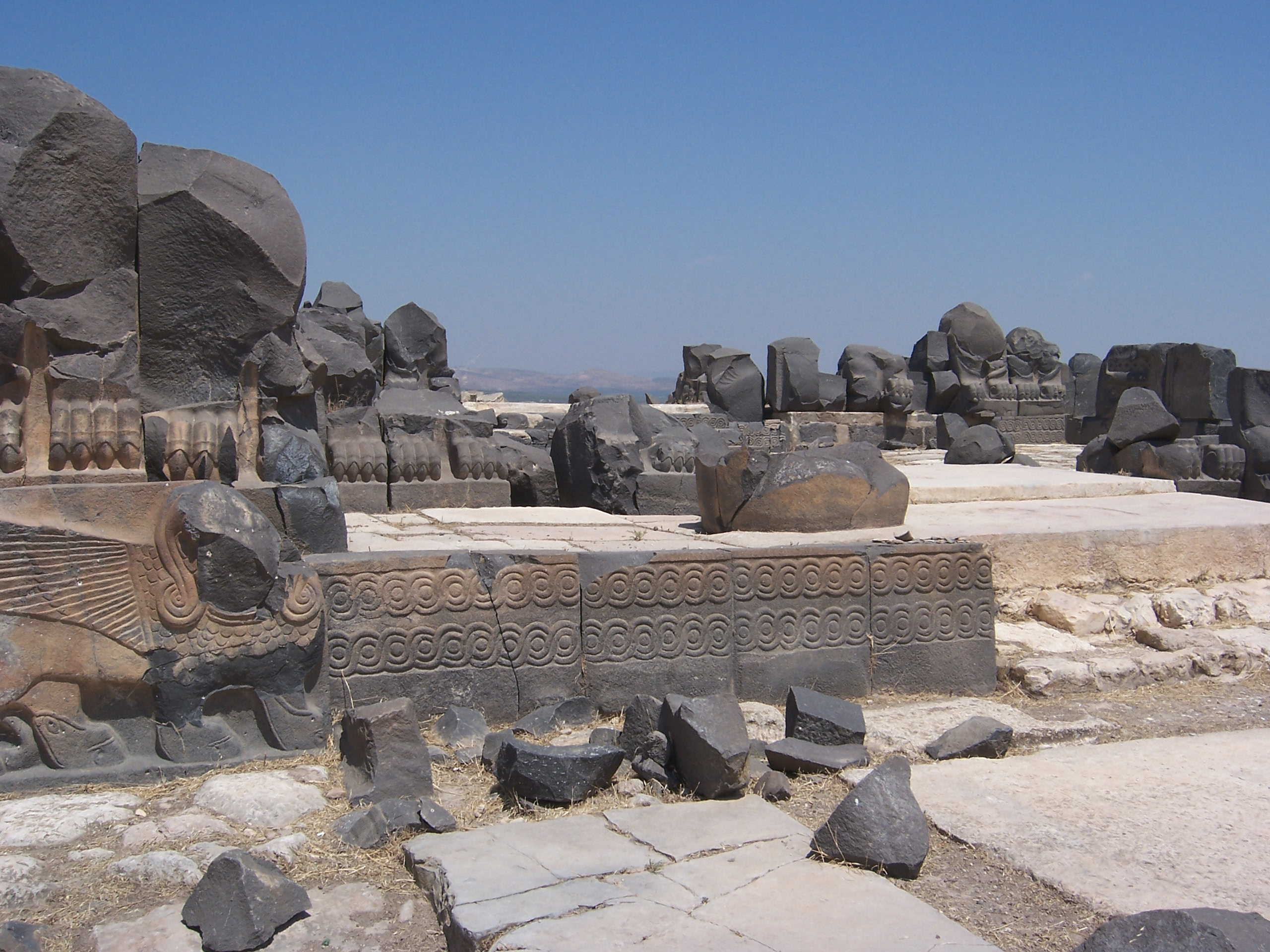
- The remains of the Ain Dara temple before 2018

- Location within Syria
- 36°27′33.7″N 36°51′7.5″E
- Type: Temple
- Periods: Late Bronze Age, Iron Age
- Cultures: Hittite, Aramean
- Location: Ain Dara village, Afrin, Aleppo Governorate, Syria
- Part of: Acropolis

History
- Built: c. 1300 BC to 740 BC

Site notes
- Material: stone
- Length: 30 m (98 ft)
- Width: 20 m (66 ft)
- Area: 600 m^{2} (6,500 ft^{2})
- Excavation dates: 1980–1985
- Condition: ruins
- Public access: Yes

Ain Dara is a settlement best known for its destroyed Iron Age Syro-Hittite temple. The temple is noted for its similarities to Solomon's Temple, also known as the "First Temple in Jerusalem", as described in the Hebrew Bible.

According to the excavator, Ali Abu Assaf, it existed from 1300 BC until 740 BC and remained almost unchanged during the construction of Solomon's Temple (1000–900 BC) as it had been before so it predates the First Temple. The temples of Emar, Mumbaqat, and Ebla (Temple D) are also comparable, as is the nearby 8th century BCE temple at Tell Tayinat. The surviving sculptures depict lions and sphinxes, which are comparable to the cherubim of the First Temple.

Massive footprints were carved into the floor; whether of giants, humans, or animals is debatable. Also left to speculation is to whom the temple is dedicated. Ain Dara may have been devoted to Inanna, the female Mesopotamian deity of fertility and civilisation, or to the Canaanite version of Ishtar, ʿAṯtart. It also might have been dedicated to the male storm deity Hadad, or it might have been an oracle on a road known as the international coastal highway between the Syrian Desert and Mediterranean Sea.

According to the Assad government, the temple was significantly damaged by Turkish jets during the Turkish military operation in Afrin in late January 2018. Reports indicate that at least 60% percent of the structure was reduced to rubble. The entire front facade of the temple has been destroyed in photos and video released online. The site's emblematic basalt lion was stolen in December 2019 by members of the Hamza Division, which was part of the Syrian National Army.

Based on remote sensing by January 2022, "the entirety of the high and low mounds, with the exception of the stone-built temple complex itself, had been bulldozed".

== Location ==
Ain Dara is located near the village of Ain Dara, in Afrin District, in the Aleppo Governorate, Syria. The site is 67 kilometres (42 mi) northwest of Aleppo near the Syro-Turkish border.

== History ==
The site history begins with the earliest habitation signs in the Chalcolithic, period during the fourth millennium BC. The tell remained occupied until the Ottoman period (1517 -1917).

Ain Dara overlooks the Afrin Valley where trade routes crossed from Mesopotamia (east), Anatolia (north), Levant (south) and the Mediterranean (west). The site covers 25 ha (60 acres), consisting of an Upper City (acropolis; 25 m (82 ft) above the plain) and Lower Town.

=== Late Bronze and Iron Age ===
Ali Abu Assaf discovered the temple and inferred that it was built in three structural phases in the period from about 1300 BC to 740 BC. The first phase was from 1300 to 1000 BC, the second phase from 1000 to 900 BC, and the third phase from 900 to 740 BC.

==== Hittite Period ====
Around 1350 BC, Suppiluliuma I of Hatti conquered most of vassal kingdoms and the land west of the Euphrates from Tushratta of Mitanni. He installed his son as the Viceroy of Aleppo which most likely controlled the Afrin Valley as well. Another son was installed as the Viceroy of Carchemish to the east. If Temple Phase I was begun around 1300 BC, then this would have happened in the late reign of Mursili II or early reign of Muwatalli II. At the time, the Hittites mobilized their armies both to the south towards Egypt and east towards Assyria. Ain Dara would then have been located on important routes with major traffic from Anatolia into the Northern Levant. The Hittite Empire controlled this region until it collapsed around 1190 BCE at the end of the Late Bronze Age.

== Architecture ==
=== General outline ===
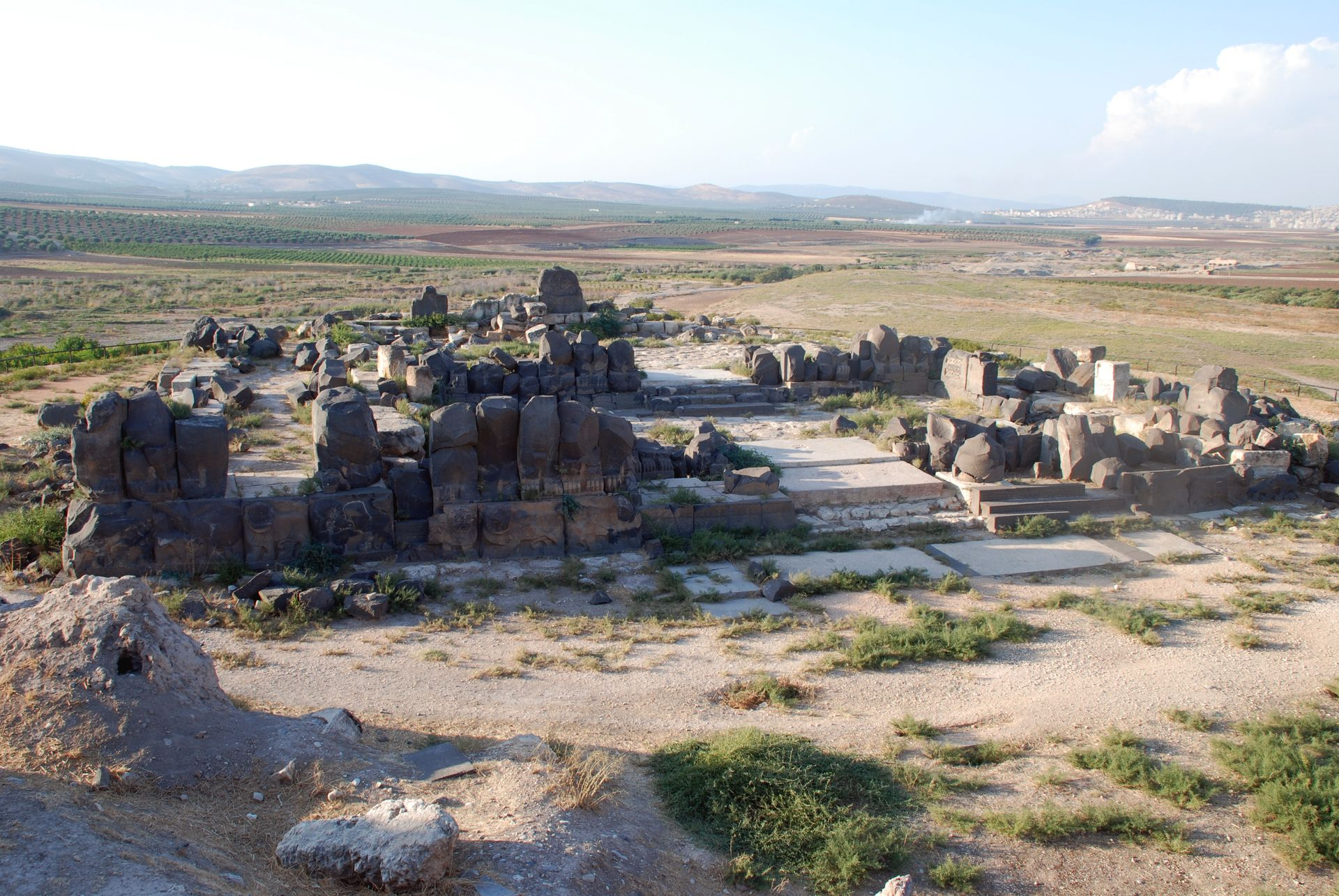
Ain Dara Temple before the Turkish bombing destroyed it in early 2018.

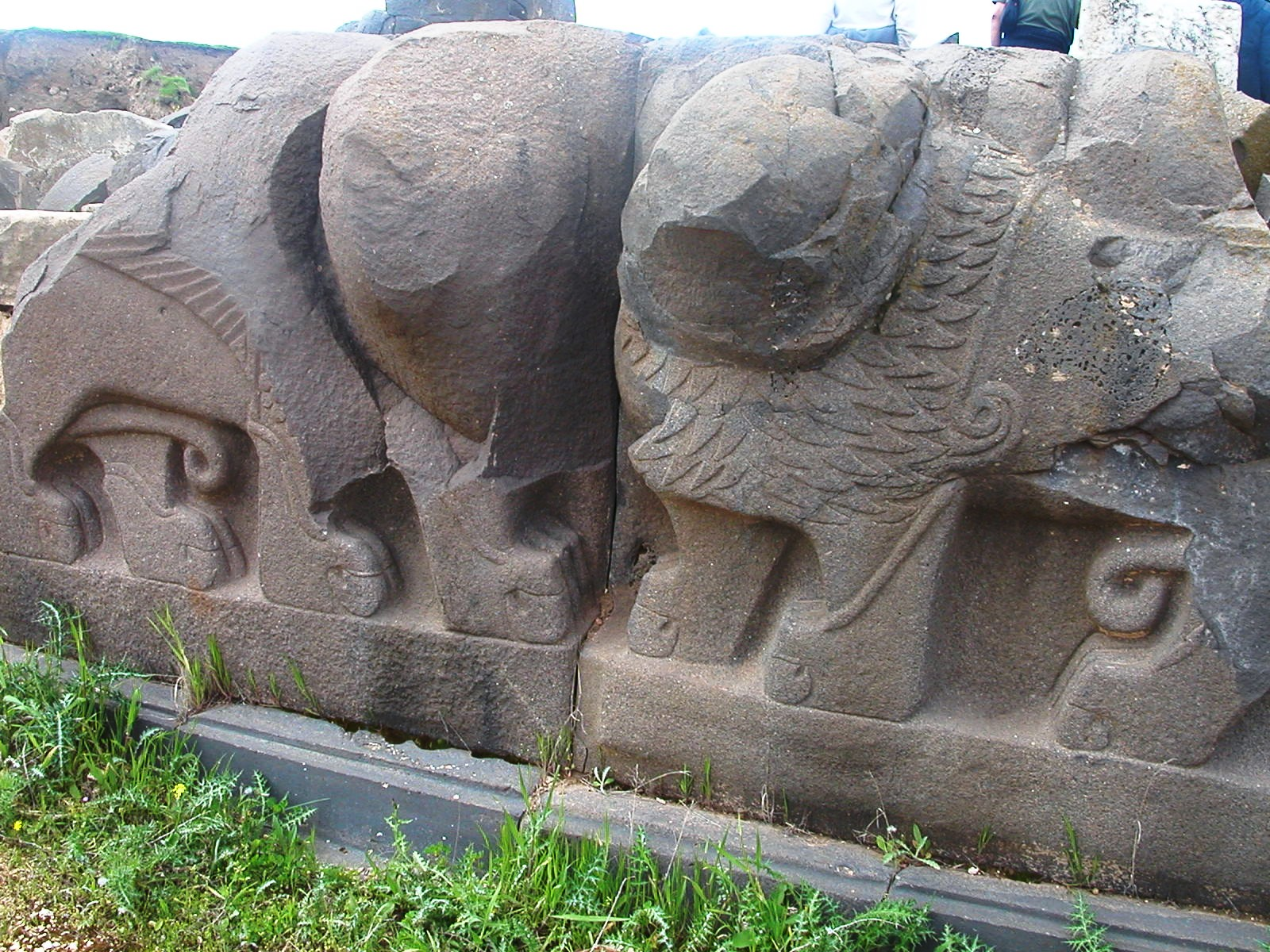
Detail of the outer wall of the Ain Dara temple, showing two lions

The Ain Dara temple, as excavated, has revealed a three-part layout with structural blocks of basalt on limestone foundations. However, it has been conjectured that the temple probably had a mud-brick superstructure covered with wood paneling, which has not survived.

=== Exterior ===
A courtyard built with sandstones provides the approach to the temple. The courtyard is paved with flagstones where a chalkstone basin for ceremonial purposes is seen. The temple, 30 by 20 m (98 by 66 ft) in size, faces southeast. Its exterior contains a cherubim relief. The entrance porch, or portico, marked by two basalt piers or pillars, and a wide hall, were not roofed over and were part of an open courtyard. The entrance pillars appear to have architectural and cultic significance. A sphinx and two lions decorate the temple portico flanking the three steps (out of four) made from basalt.

=== Interior ===
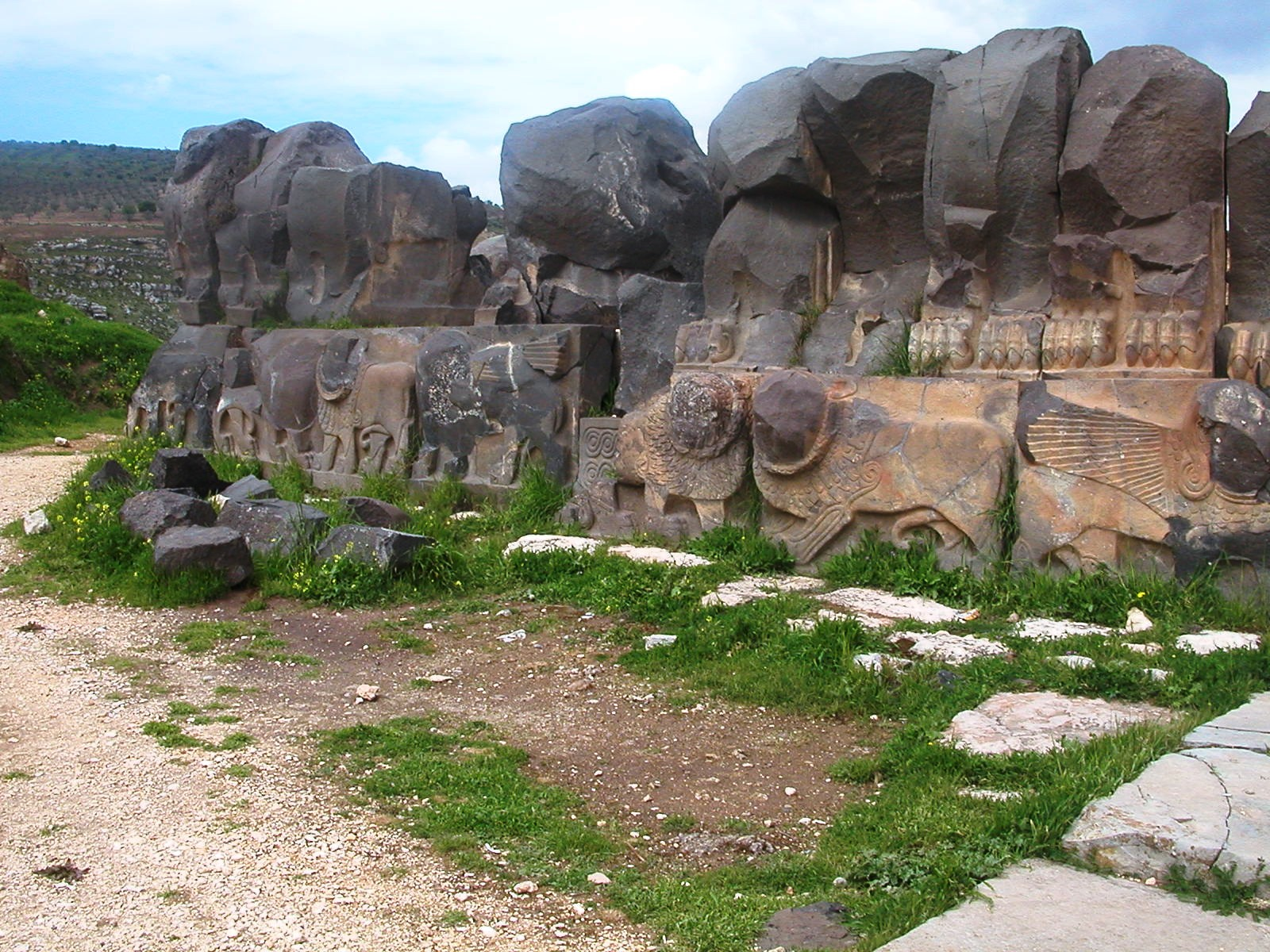
Reconstructed wall of Ain Dara Temple with cherubim relief in lower panel

The main sections include the porch, a middle room and an inner room or sanctum sanctorum. The middle room is 6 metres (20 ft) by 15.5 metres (51 ft) in area and is lined with lion reliefs, guilloché, and panels resembling windows. The square main hall is 16 metres (52 ft) by 16 metres (52 ft); at the rear end of this hall reliefs and a stele were added. There are basalt reliefs in the lower wall panels. An elevated podium (0.75 m (2 ft 6 in) high platform), a niche, and a secondary wall are part of the visible remains.

In the small shrine area situated at the innermost area of the temple, the wall has carved sockets and grooves, which point to the former presence of a wooden screen. A ramp joins the main room to the platform area and the sanctum. The back wall of the sanctum has a niche which probably housed a statue of a god or goddess. Paved floors and wall reliefs are visible in the multistoried hallways, at least three stories high, that flank three sides of the temple, with at least one southern entrance. Figure-eight lattice patterns are included on two false, recessed windows that were carved into the temple walls.

While all these were dated as part of first- and second-phase creations, the material remains unearthed at the site identify additions made in the third phase of construction, an "ambulatory with a series of side chambers on three sides of the temple". It has also been inferred that these chambers were part of the pre-existing temple platform and not linked to the main temple.

=== Footprints ===
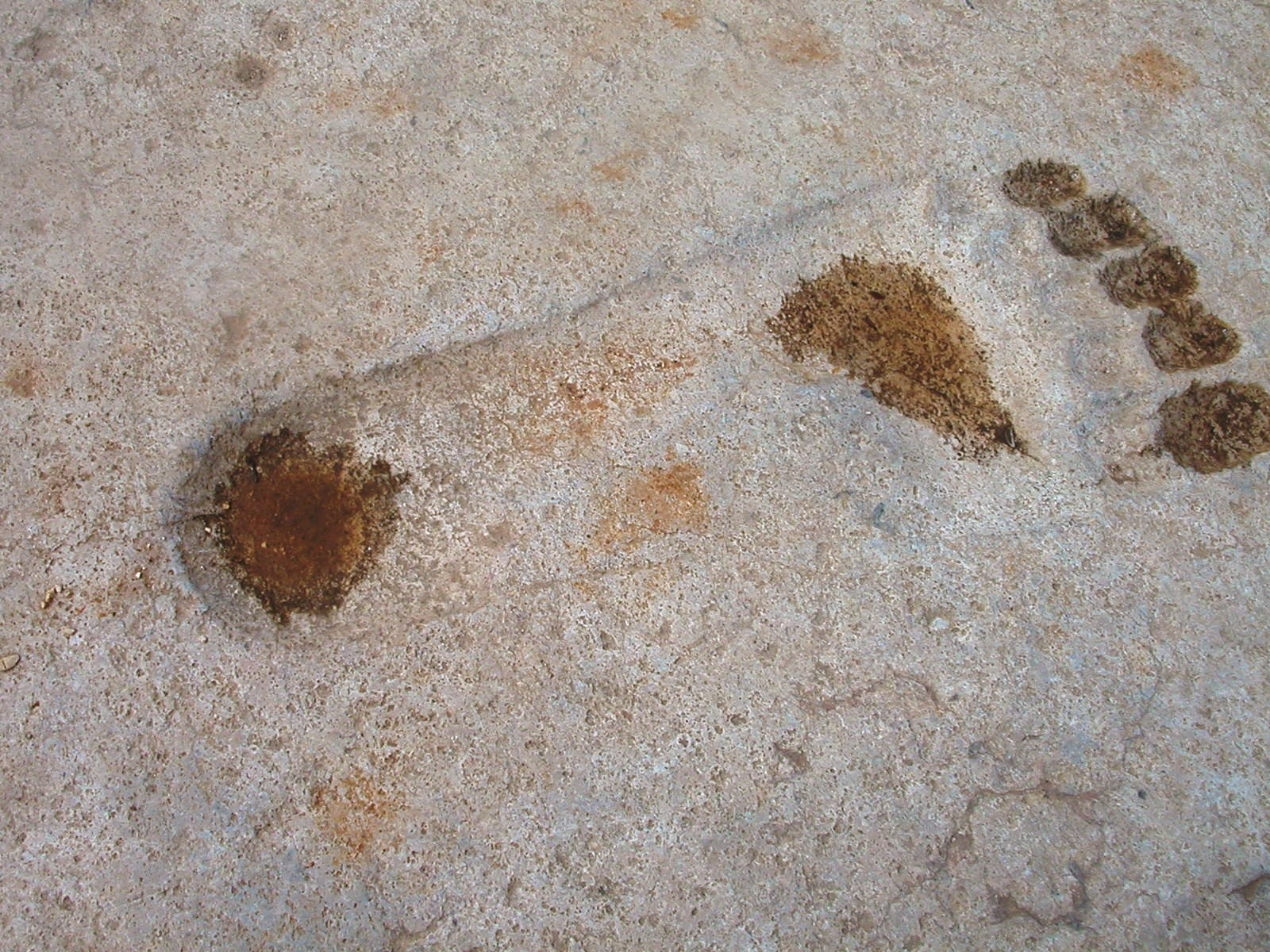
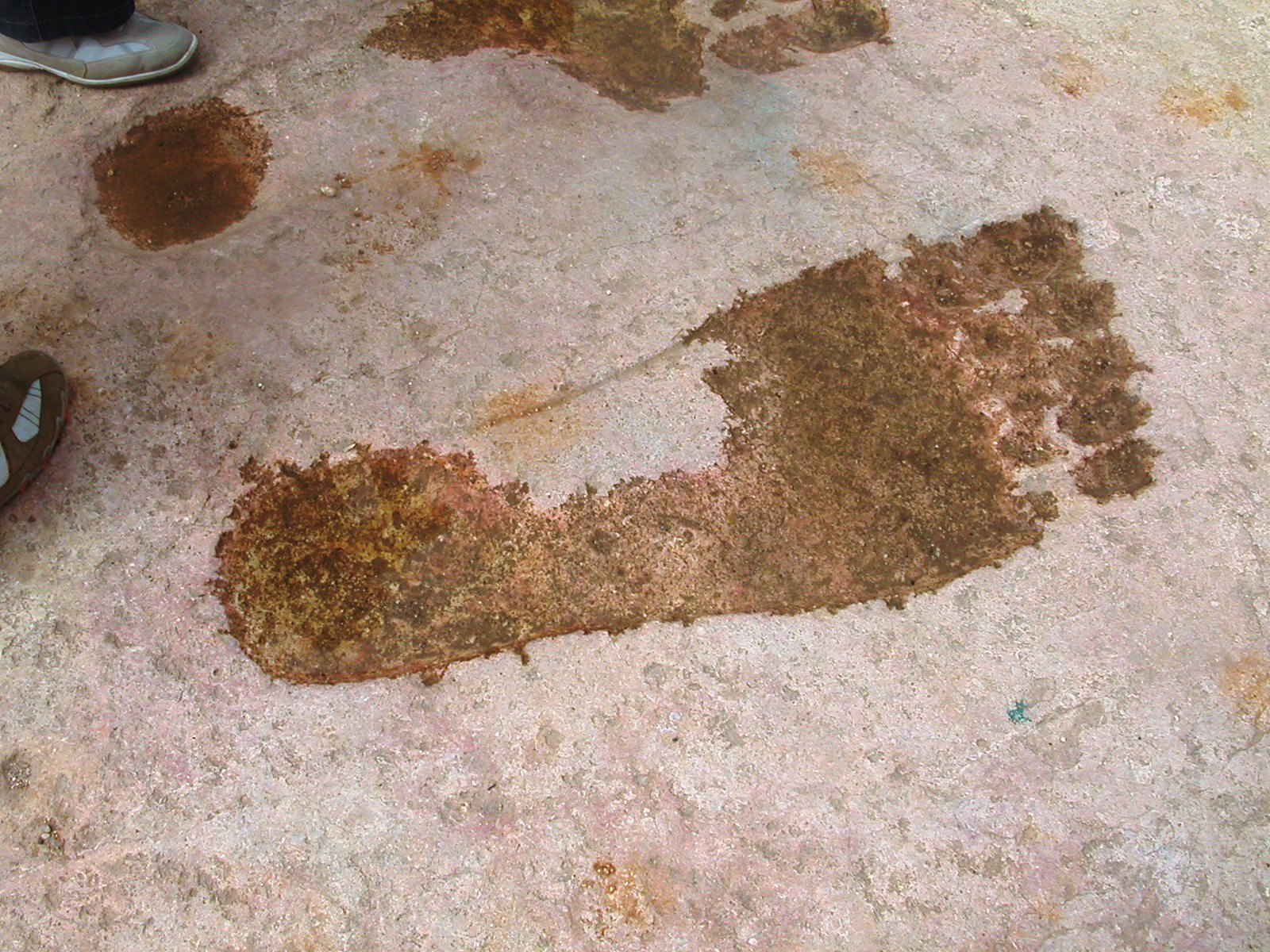
Left: The left footprint (ca. 1 metre in length). Right: The right footprint (about 1 metre in length)

A pair of large, bare footprints, each about 1 m (3 ft 3 in) in length, are carved into the stone floors of the portico, followed by a single footprint carved beyond the first two, and another single footprint carved into the threshold. "These footprints undoubtedly represent the deity to whom the temple was dedicated, probably Ba'al Hadad, striding into his abode, towards the throne room." This parallels Ezekiel 43:7, where Yahweh explains that the Temple in Jerusalem "is the place of My throne and the place for the soles of My feet". Such an individual would be 20 m (66 ft) in height based on the size of the footprints.

Monson has also noted that the deities in all the Ain Dara temple reliefs have "shoes with curled-up toes". The source of the footprints is debatable.

=== Similarities with Solomon's Temple ===
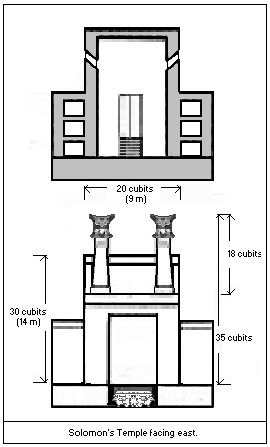
Conceptual sketch of elevation of Solomon's Temple as explained in the Hebrew Bible

After the 1980–1985 excavations, the similarities between the temple at Ain Dara with Solomon's Temple in Jerusalem as described in the Biblical texts, though not seen on the ground, were discussed by archaeologists and historians. Already the smaller 8th-century Tell Tayinat temple, discovered during excavations in 1936 and located about 50 miles (80 km) away, had "caused a sensation because of its similarities to Solomon's Temple."

There are many features in common with Solomon's Temple as described in the Books of Kings. The layout of Dara is similar to that of the Biblical temple, which was also of a long room plan with the three-room configuration of a portico at the entrance followed by the main chamber with the shrine. The difference is in the antechamber, which is an add-on in the Ain Dara temple. The size of the Solomon temple was 35 m (115 ft) by 9 m (30 ft) while that of the Ain Dara is 30 m (98 ft) long by 20 m (66 ft) wide without side chambers. Other similarities include

- a location on a high place overlooking a city
- erected on a raised platform, with a narrow portico and a roof supported on pillars flanked by reliefs on the walls and carvings of similar motifs
- the raised podium.

In brief, 33 of the architectural elements found in Ain Dara are tallied with 65 of the features mentioned in the Biblical description of Solomon's Temple.

== Excavation ==
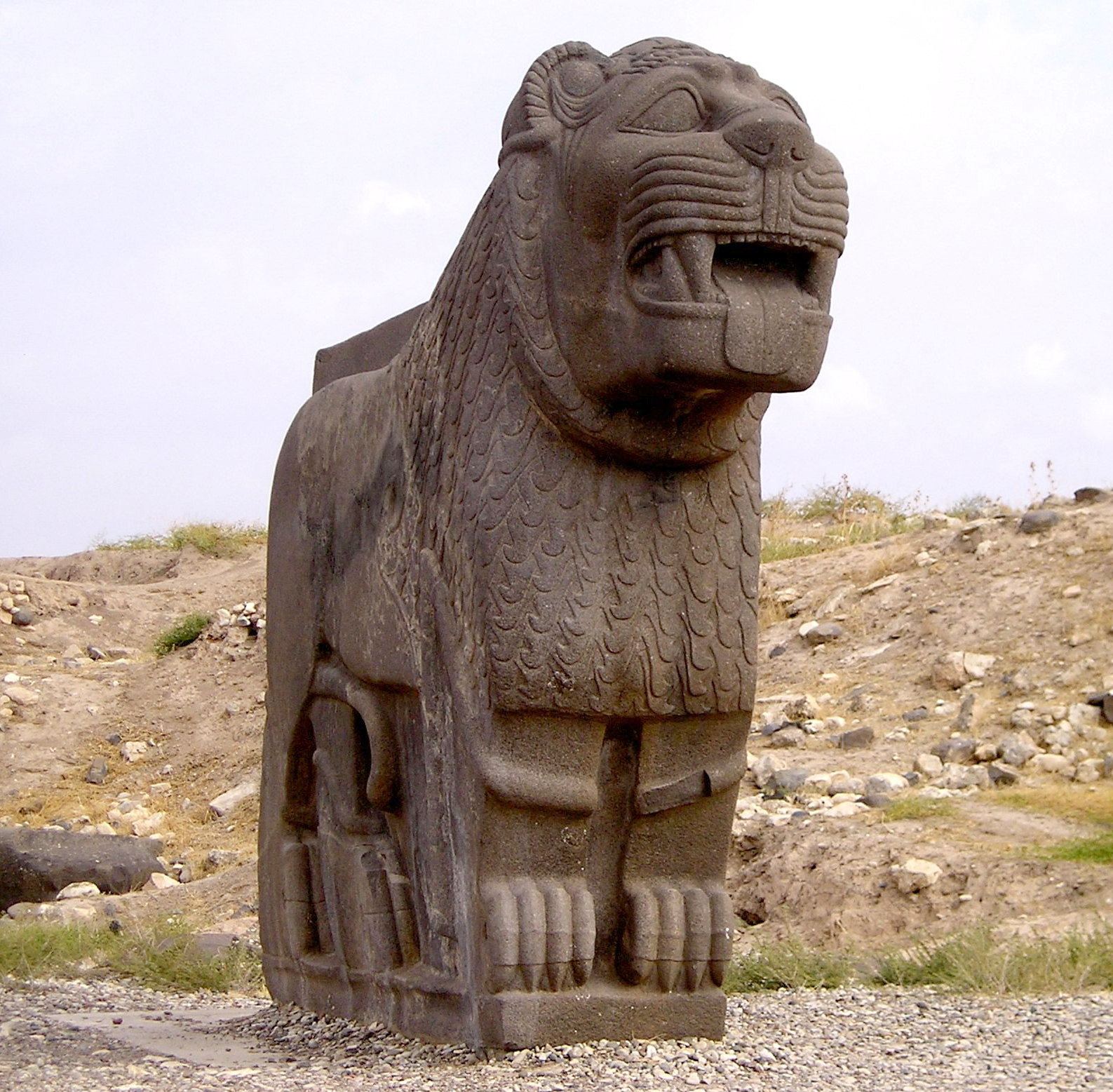
Colossal basalt lion found in 1955

The discovery of the temple was the result of a fortuitous finding of a colossal basalt lion in 1955. Excavations in 1956, 1962, and 1964 were conducted by Maurice Dunand and Feisal Seirafi; beginning in 1976, Ali Abu Assaf continued the work. Excavations have been limited to the temple in the Iron Age, focusing less on minor finds from the Bronze Age.

== Destruction in 2018–2019 ==
=== Destruction by Turkish military in 2018 ===
In late January 2018, both the Syrian Directorate-General of Antiquities and Museums and pro-rebel Syrian Observatory for Human Rights reported major destruction of the temple following airstrikes by the Turkish Air Force in the course of their Afrin offensive. Aerial bombardments of the Ain Dara site were first reported by a local resident via Dutch news network NOS on 23 January 2018.

As reported on MSN news, with the headline "Blown to bits", it is clear the temple was heavily damaged. "For 3,000 years, the lion sculptures of Syria's Ain Dara stood as testaments to the Iron Age. But as Turkish bombardment pounds the region, they have little left but their paws."

As stated by the Directorate of Antiquities in Afrin on 31 January 2018:

"Turkish forces revealed the occupation of Syrian geography in its real face, especially the Turkish state, since the declaration of war on Afrin canton on 20 January 2018, as it escalated Operation Olive Branch to go beyond the targeting of military forces to include shelling villages and towns full of civilians from the elderly, children and women To the rich and varied history and civilization of the province from prehistoric times to the present day."
"On 27 January 2018, the Turkish state warplanes bombarded and damaged the ancient "Ein -Darat" temple, despite its distance from the fighting fronts and the areas of engagement, by about 20 kilometers. Accordingly, the Directorate of Antiquities in Afrin canton and all the bodies and councils associated with Democratic Autonomous Administration and civil institutions condemn this savage shelling of sites and archaeological sites that are the property of all mankind. We call on the international community and all organizations involved in this field to intervene immediately, seriously and Turkish Cultural and Human Heritage in Afrin canton".

The Directorate-General of Antiquities and Museums and Syrian Ministry of Culture issued a statement condemning the attack on the site as "aggression of the Turkish regime on archaeological sites in the northern countryside of Aleppo" and called on international organizations to denounce the attack on Ain Dara.

=== Basalt lion stolen by Turkish-backed group ===
In early December 2019, al-Hamzat, backed by Turkish forces, took part in Operation Peace Spring, the 2019 Turkish offensive into northeastern Syria, journeying out to eventually plunder the already Turkish-bombed disaster area of 'Ain Dara's archaeological site. It was reported across multiple news outlets including the Syrian information news network of Syrian Arab News Agency (SANA) that this group also carried out illegal excavations in the areas of Afrin and looted facilities near Ras al-Ayn in the al-Hasakah region of Northeast Syria.

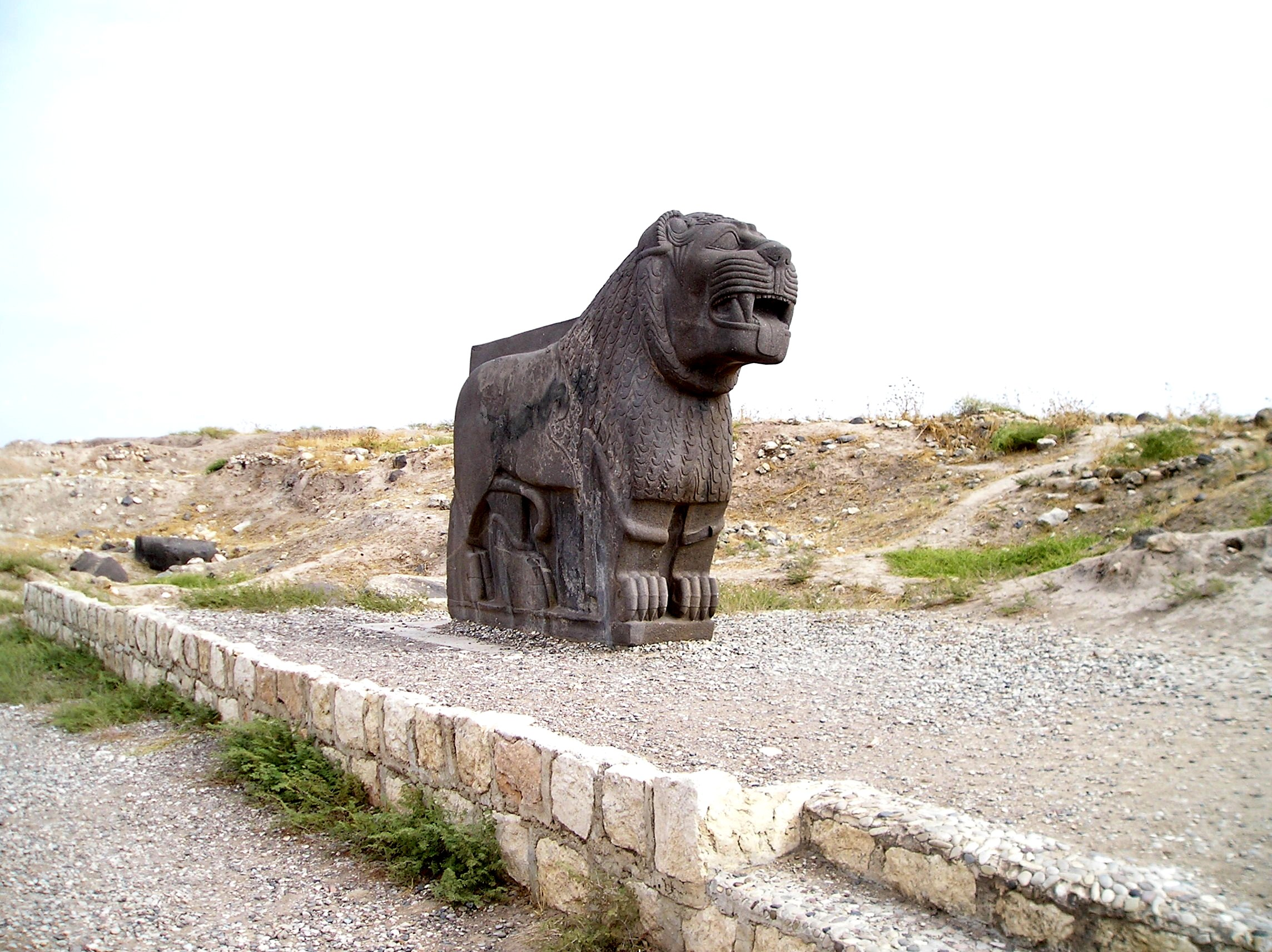
The giant basalt Lion which was stolen in December 2019 by Turkish backed Syrian rebels.

The basalt lion sculpture, which was discovered in 1956, like the Ain Dara temple itself, is now gone:

On December 20th [2019], the Turkish army and its mercenaries attacked Afrin with tanks, artillery and jets causing massive destruction of the city....Recent footage of a military exercise by a pro-Turkish militia (National Liberation Front) who established a shooting range against the archaeological hill of Ain Dara in the occupied Afrin province invaded and controlled by Turkish forces and their proxy militias last year, revealed the tragic disappearance of the famous historical masterpiece known as The Lion of Afrin. Ain Dara itself was targeted by Turkish jets in 2018 as Turkish units and their proxy forces advanced on the area known for its archaeological wealth that featured one of the world's oldest temples often compared in significance to the Temple of Solomon... The disappearance of the Lion of Afrin marks another war crime against Syrian history and humanity at large."

=== Warnings gone by as careless and/or deliberate destruction continues ===
U.N. organizations and human rights groups have heavily warned since February 2019 that Turkish backed rebel forces were carrying out systematic violent and deadly attacks against Kurdish civilians in Afrin. “The commission finds there are reasonable grounds to believe that armed group members in Afrin committed the war crimes of hostage-taking, cruel treatment, torture, and pillage,” the United Nations report said.

=== The end of Ain Dara and the ancient basalt lion ===
After months of warnings, on 17 December 2019, the Prensa Latina news source detailed the looting of Ain Dara, reporting:

[T]hese elements carried out illegal excavations in areas of the town of Afrin, in the north of Aleppo and looted properties and facilities in the village of Tal Mohammed and near that of Ras Al Ayn, in that of Hasaka. Various sources also indicated that in the village of Joga, near the aforementioned Afrin, terrorists of the Al Hamzat organization seized a Basalt Lion at the Archaeological site of Ain Dara".

There are many tell [archaeological mound] sites in the surrounding area, such as Tall Sulaymānī, which in Arabic means "Tell of Solomon". Furthermore, to the east is Qamishli, the second-largest city in al-Hasakah Governorate, which was home to a significant Jewish community in ancient times. It was also the modern center of Syriac Christianity, formed after the 1915 Sayfo, a genocide perpetrated against Syrian Christians during World War I, which followed the Armenian and Greek genocides. An estimated 20,000 Christians left the city of Qamishli after the 2011 Syrian War erupted.

Qamishli is situated at the base of the Taurus Mountains, located near the area of ancient Hurrian city of Urkesh, which was founded during the 3000 BC era. Excavations were on hold during the Syrian civil war since 2011, but unlike Ain Dara, the Urkesh site has been protected by People's Defense Units of the Syrian Democratic Forces since 2016 and while As of 2022, digs have not resumed but archaeologists such as Marilyn Kelly-Buccellati, Giorgio Buccellati, and Federico Buccellati are active at the site. Additionally, in the town of Urkesh, the copper Louvre lion and accompanying stone tablet bearing the earliest known text in Hurrian was discovered, dating to the Akkadian period of 2300 – 2159 BC. A second copper lion found there is on permanent display at the Metropolitan Museum of Art.
