= Shaykh al-Hadid =

Shaykh al-Hadid شيخ الحديد
- Town
- Location within Syria
- Coordinates: 36°30′4″N 36°35′52″E
- Country: Syria
- Governorate: Aleppo
- District: Afrin
- Subdistrict: Shaykh al-Hadid

Population (2004 census)
  - Total: 5,063
- Time zone: UTC+3 (AST)

Shaykh al-Hadid (Arabic: شيخ الحديد, also spelled Sheikh Hadid, Sheikh El-Hadid; Kurdish: Şiyê) is a town in northern Syria, administratively part of the Afrin District of the Aleppo Governorate, located northwest of Aleppo near the border with Turkey. Nearby localities include Kafr Safra to the south and Darmashkanli to the northeast. According to the Syria Central Bureau of Statistics (CBS), Shaykh al-Hadid had a population of 5,063 in the 2004 census. On March 4, 2018, the town came under the control of the Syrian National Army.

Shaykh al-Hadid is the administrative center of Nahiya Shaykh al-Hadid of the Afrin District.
