= Basuta =

Basuta Basûte
- باسوطة
- Interactive map of Basuta
- Country: Syria
- Governorate: Aleppo
- District: Afrin
- Nahiyah: Afrin
- Time zone: UTC+3

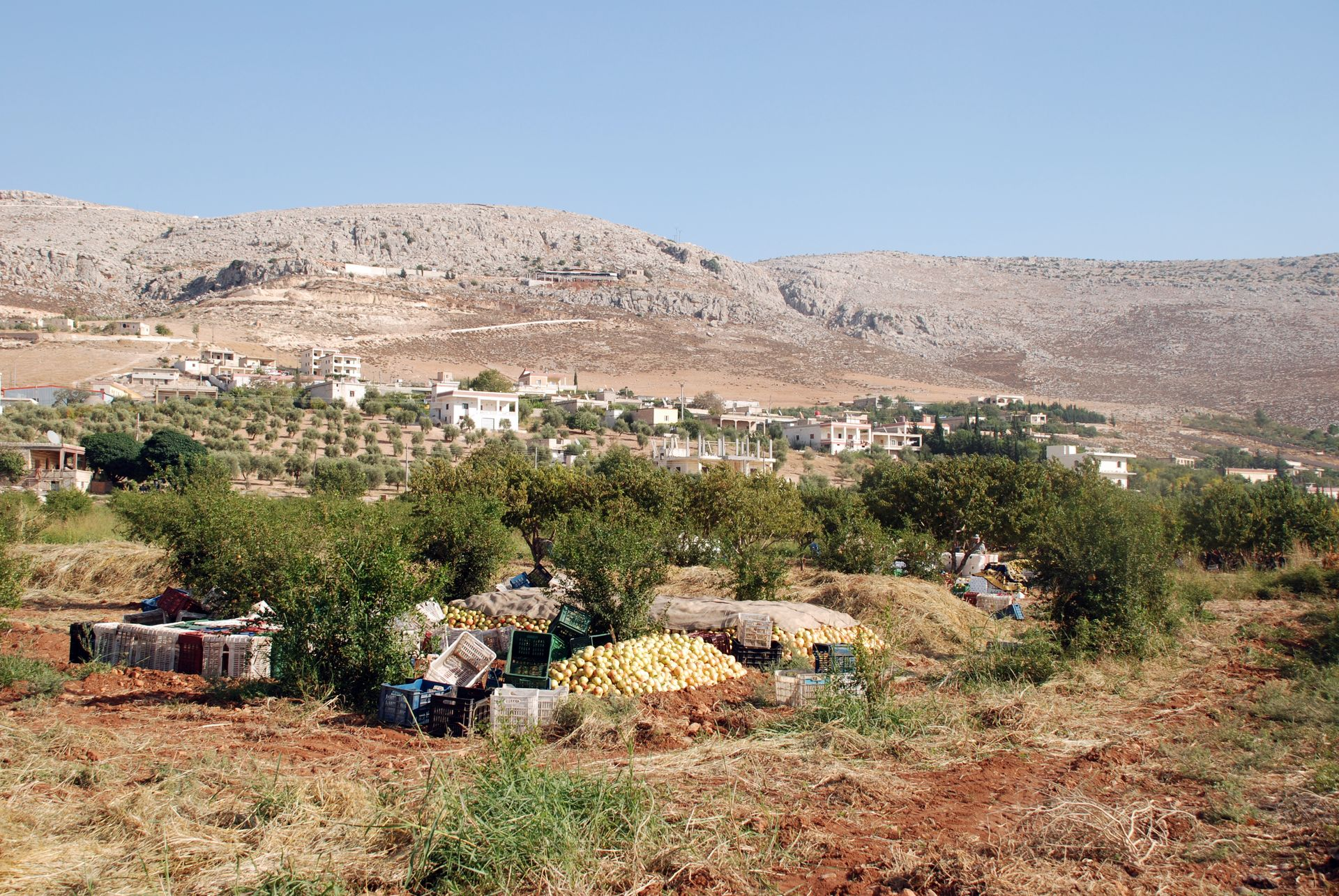
orchard in Basuta

Basuta (Arabic: باسوطة; Kurdish: Basûte) is a village in the Afrin Subdistrict, Afrin District, Aleppo Governorate, Syria. According to the Syria Central Bureau of Statistics (CBS), It had a population of 2,389 in the 2004 census.
