= Maabatli =

Ma'abatli معبطلي Mabeta, Mobetan, Mobato
- Town
- Location within Syria
- Coordinates: 36°33′45″N 36°44′18″E
- Country: Syria
- Governorate: Aleppo
- District: Afrin
- Subdistrict: Maabatli
- Time zone: UTC+3 (AST)

Maabatli (Arabic: معبطلي, romanized: Maabatli or Mobetan, Kurmanji Kurdish: Mabeta or Mabata), is a town in northern Syria, administratively part of the Aleppo Governorate, located northwest of Aleppo in the center of Afrin District. Nearby localities include Afrin to the southeast, Rajo to the northwest and Jindires to the south. The town is also the administrative center of the Maabatli nahiyah of the Afrin District with a combined population of 11,741. Previously controlled by the YPG since 2012, Syrian National Army forces occupied the city alongside the Afrin city center on March 18, 2018.

Maabatli is the administrative center of Nahiya Maabatli of the Afrin District.

== Demographics ==
The majority of its inhabitants are of Kurdish ethnicity and are mostly Alevis. Some of them come from the 1930s Kurdish Alevis who fled the persecution of the Turkish Armed Forces during the Dersim massacre and the Grey Wolves during the Maras Massacre, settled in Mabeta.
