= Sharran =

Sharran شران
- Town
- Location within Syria
- Coordinates: 36°37′23″N 36°56′11″E
- Country: Syria
- Governorate: Aleppo
- District: Afrin
- Subdistrict: Sharran

Population (2004 census)
  - Town: 2,596
  - Metro: 13,632
- Time zone: UTC+3 (AST)

Sharran (Arabic: شران), also known as Sharranli, is a village in northern Syria, administratively part of the Aleppo Governorate, located northwest of Aleppo near the Turkish border. Nearby localities include Azaz and Qatma to the east and Afrin to the south. According to the Syria Central Bureau of Statistics (CBS), Sharran had a population of 2,596 in the 2004 census. The town is also the administrative center of the Sharran nahiyah of the Afrin District consisting of 35 villages with a combined population of 13,632. On March 6, 2018, the town came under the control of the Syrian National Army supported by the Turkish Armed Forces.

Sharran is the administrative center of Nahiya Sharran of the Afrin District.

In late 19th century, German orientalist Martin Hartmann noted Sharranli as a settlement with 25 houses inhabited by Turkmen.
