= Abeen, Jordan =

Abeen
- Location of Abeen Jordan
- Coordinates: 32°21′37″N 35°48′32″E
- PAL: 226/196
- Country: Jordan
- District: Abeen ,Ajloun
- Governorate: Ajloun Governorate
- Elevation: 1,200 m (3,900 ft)

Population (2019 census)
  - Total: 15,286

Abeen (Arabic: عبين) is a Jordanian village located in Ajloun Governorate in northern Jordan. Administratively, it is part of the Sakrah District within the Qasabah Ajloun Brigade.

== Geography ==
The village rises to an elevation of approximately 1,200 meters above sea level. It is characterized by a natural vegetation cover consisting of oak, maple, cypress, pine, and pistachio trees.

== History ==
In 1596, during the Ottoman Empire, the village was noted in the census as being located in the nahiya of Bani al-Asar in the Liwa of Hawran. Named Ibbin, it had a Muslim population of 21 households and 12 bachelors; and a Christian population of 10 households and 5 bachelors. They paid a fixed tax-rate of 25% on various agricultural products, including wheat (1950 a.), barley (900 a.), summer crops (450 a.) vineyards/fruit trees (700 a.), goats and beehives (150 a.), in addition to "occasional revenues" (150 a.); a total of 4,300 akçe.

In 1838 'Abbin was noted to be in ruins.

The Jordanian census of 1961 found 1,364 inhabitants in 'Ibbin.

== Population ==
According to the 2019 Population and Housing Census, Abeen had a population of 15,286. Residents work primarily in agriculture, trade, sheep herding, and government employment.

== Facilities and archaeological sites ==
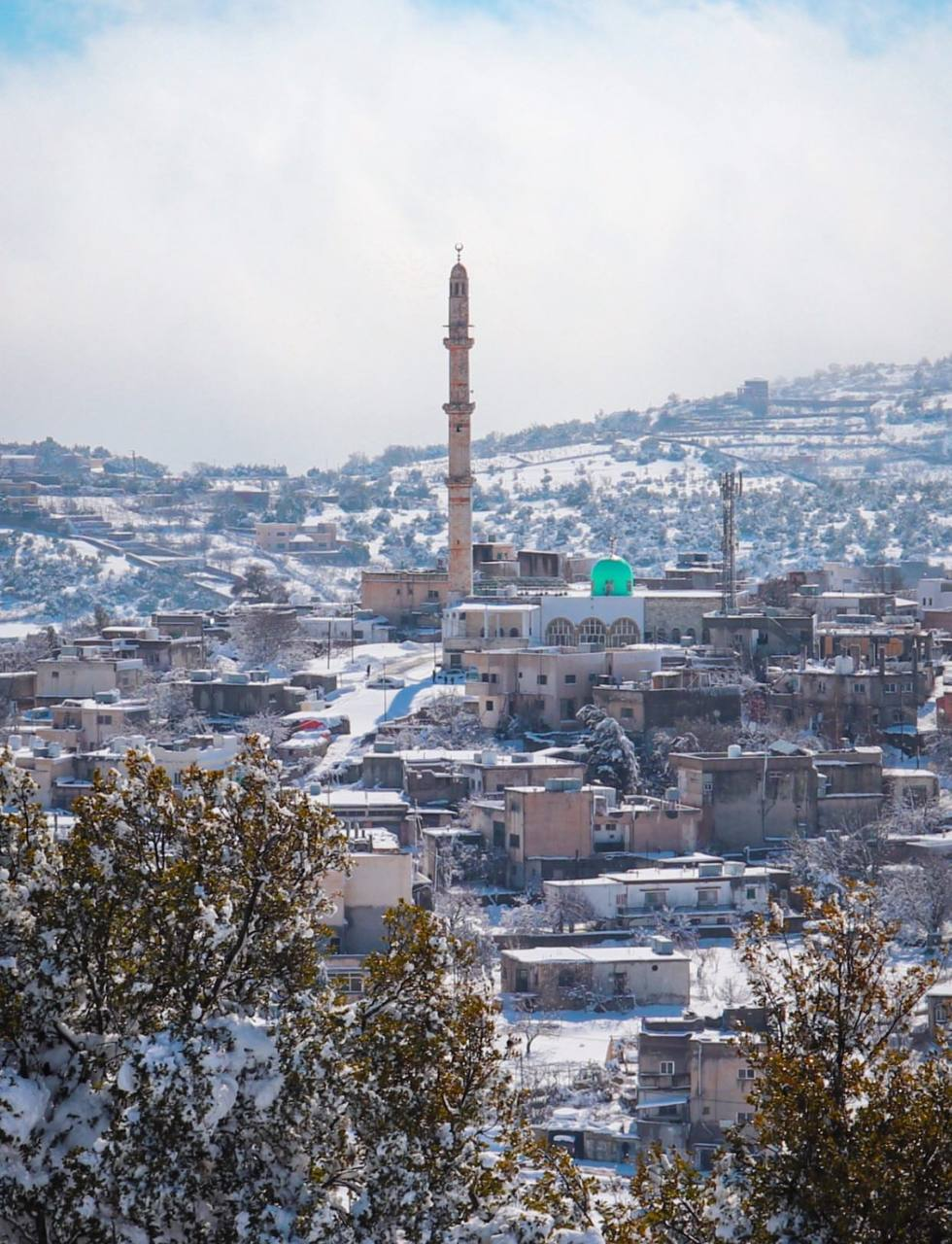
Abin town in winter and snow

The village contains two notable archaeological areas: Deir Al-Yous and Al-Maqati‘, both rich in Roman-era remains. It also includes the Abeen Grand Mosque and the Princess Haya Hospital.

== See also ==
- List of cities in Jordan

== Bibliography ==
- Government of Jordan, Department of Statistics (1964). First Census of Population and Housing. Volume I: Final Tables; General Characteristics of the Population (PDF).
- Hütteroth, W.-D.; Abdulfattah, K. (1977). Historical Geography of Palestine, Transjordan and Southern Syria in the Late 16th Century. Erlanger Geographische Arbeiten, Sonderband 5. Erlangen, Germany: Vorstand der Fränkischen Geographischen Gesellschaft. ISBN 3-920405-41-2.
- Robinson, E.; Smith, E. (1841). Biblical Researches in Palestine, Mount Sinai and Arabia Petraea: A Journal of Travels in the year 1838. Vol. 3. Boston: Crocker & Brewster.
