= Ain Dara, Aleppo Governorate =

Ain Dara عين دارة
- Village
- Location within Syria
- Coordinates: 36°27′50″N 36°51′55″E
- Country: Syria
- Governorate: Aleppo
- District: Afrin District
- Subdistrict: Afrin

Population (2004 census)
  - Total: 248
- Time zone: UTC+3 (AST)

Ain Dara (Arabic: عين دارة, romanized: ʿAyn Dāra, also spelled Ein Dara or Ayn Darah, Kurdish: Endarê) is a Yezidi village in northern Syria, administratively part of the Afrin District of the Aleppo Governorate, located northwest of Aleppo. Nearby localities include Afrin to the north, Karzahayel to the east and Bassouta to the south. According to the Syria Central Bureau of Statistics (CBS), Ain Dara had a population of 248 in the 2004 census. According to newer data in 2013-2014 conducted by MCK (Mausu'a Ciyaye Kurmanc), Ayn Dara had a population of 601.

The modern-day settlement of Ain Dara is situated just east of the ancient Ain Dara temple. On March 20, 2018, the village came under the control of the Syrian National Army.
