= Qatma =

Qatma قطمة
- Village
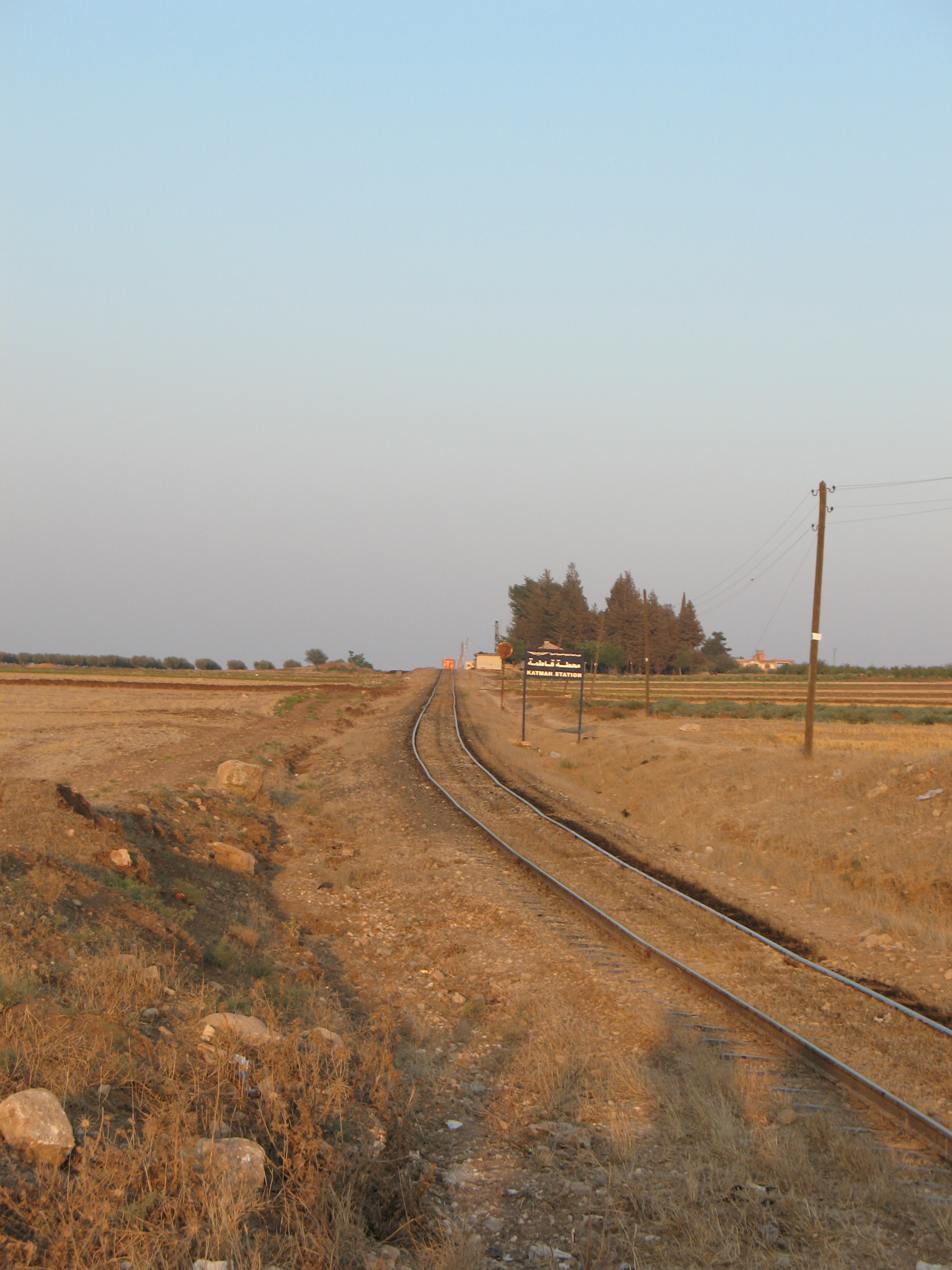
- The railway station at Qatma

- Location in Syria
- Coordinates: 36°35′N 36°57′E
- Country: Syria
- Governorate: Aleppo
- District: Afrin
- Nahiyah: Sharran
- Elevation: 600 m (2,000 ft)

Population (2004)
  - Total: 1,215
- Time zone: UTC+3 (AST)

Qaṭma (Arabic: قطمة; Kurdish: Qitmê) also spelled Katma is a village in northwestern Syria, within the Afrin District (Aleppo Governorate). It lay within the de facto Afrin Canton of the Autonomous Administration of North and East Syria since January 2014, until it was captured by the Syrian National Army on March 7, 2018. Its located to the northeast of Afrin and west of Azaz. According to the Syria Central Bureau of Statistics, Qaṭma had a population of 1,215 in the 2004 census.

Formerly a station on the Baghdad Railway, which connected Istanbul and Aleppo, in the 1920s it became the administrative center of the area. Today, Qatme forms a small cluster of Yazidi villages alongside Sinka, Baflun, and Qestel Jindo.

The population of Qatme historically consisted of Yazidi and Muslim Kurds, as well as a substantial Armenian community. This diversity is reflected in the presence of both a mosque in the town center and a church, as well as the shrines of Sheikh Hanan and Pir Jafar near the Mashala cemetery on outskirts of the town, which are revered and visited by Yazidis, Druzes and Muslims alike.

Yazidi families were central to the founding of Qatme, with additional families moving in from surrounding villages over time. In recent years, the population, previously around 6,000, increased due to an influx of refugees from nearby Azaz and Aleppo. Yazidis currently make up no more than 30 percent of the inhabitants.
