= Fafertin =

Village in northwestern Syria

Coordinates: 36°19′14″N 36°54′27″E

Fafertin (Arabic: فافرتين; Kurdish: Fafirtîn) is a village in northwestern Syria, located in the Jebel Sem'an region of the Dead Cities. The village was founded in the 4th century CE, and in 2011 it was named a UNESCO World Heritage Site as part of the Dead Cities. The only structure preserved in the village is the apse of its church, one of the oldest surviving churches in the world. It had a population of 507 in the 2004 census.

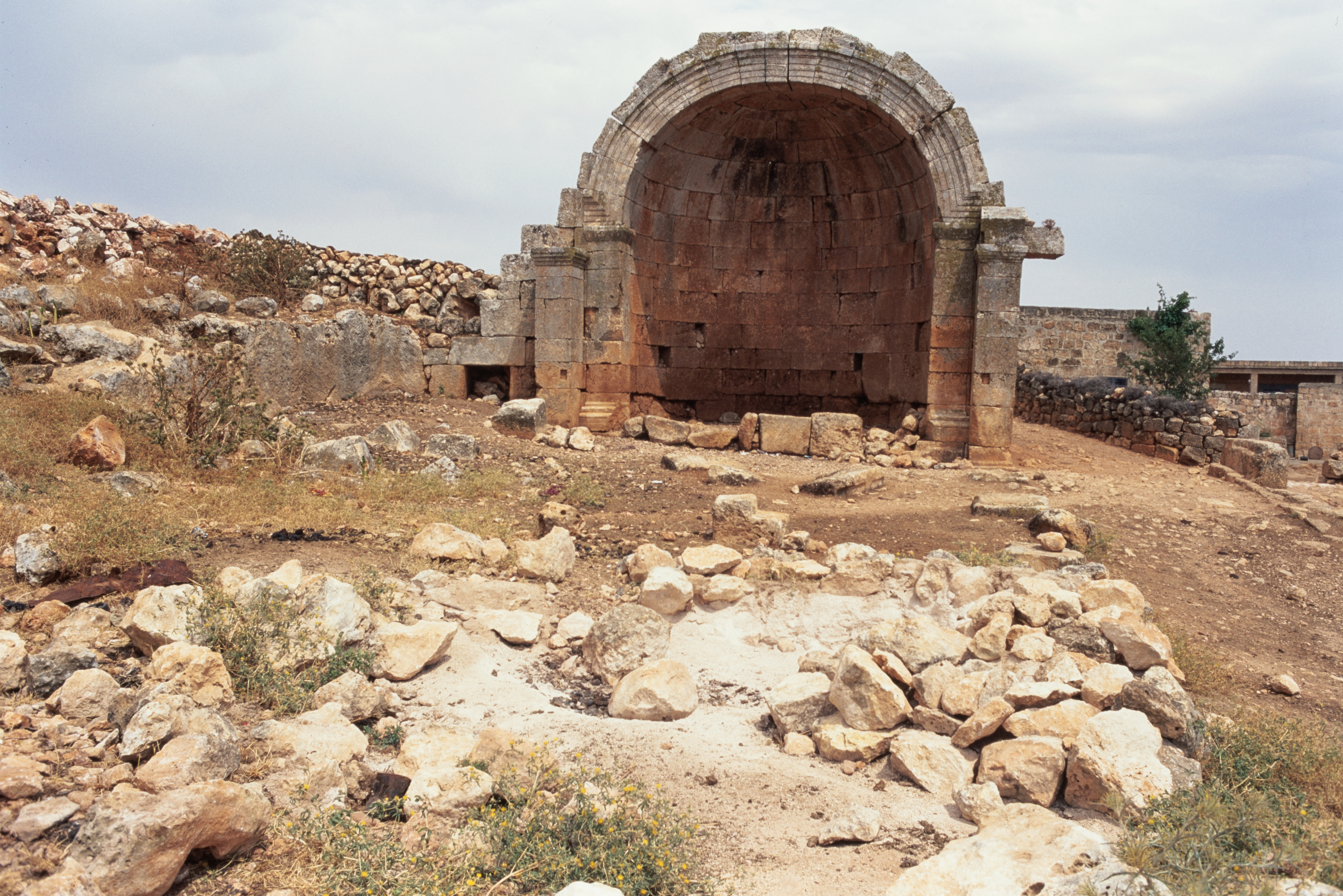
View of sanctuary apse with diaconicon to the north

== Location ==
Fafertin is located under a crest on an eastward slope in the heart of the Jebel Sem'an region. There is arable land on the nearby ridge and valley, and the town is still inhabited by Kurds.

== Archaeological remains ==
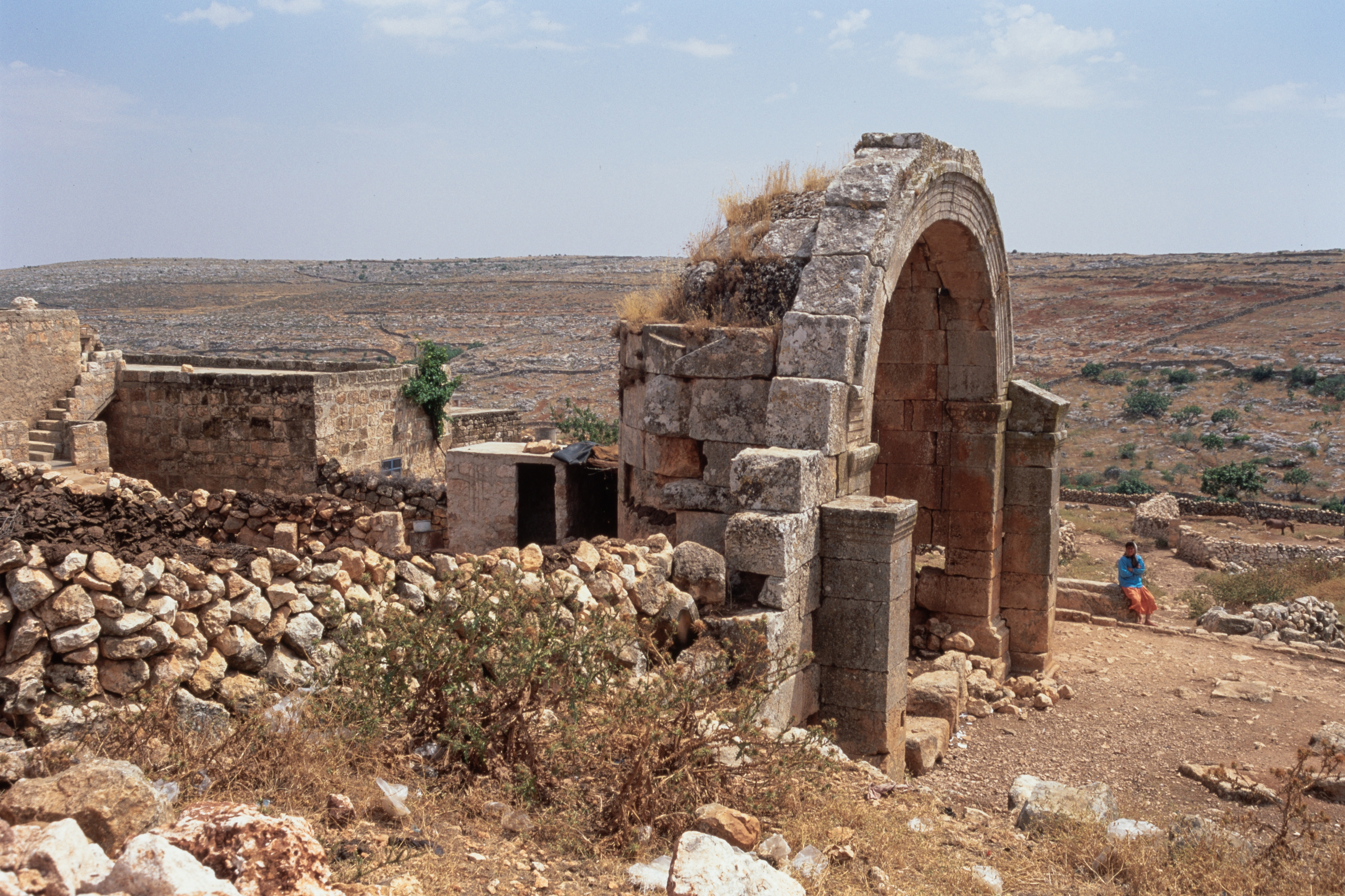
View of apse from north

The only archaeological remain at Fafertin is the church, and its apse stands in good condition. The earliest surviving church in Syria, it dates to 372 CE, as mentioned in an inscription found by H. C. Butler on the eastern doorway lintel of the south aisle. A complete record of the church plan was observed and recorded by Butler during the Princeton Archaeological Expedition in 1905, but much of the structure has deteriorated since. Today, the triumphal arch, which has four bands, and a circle with a chi rho symbol at its center decorates the arch's keystone is still preserved at the church's east end. The apse was originally flanked by square side chambers, both accessed from the aisles. The doorway to the north chamber from the aisle is still preserved. The south chamber also had a southern doorway, leading to the outside. The church's north wall was essentially cut out of the natural rock on the hillside. The church comprised a nave of seven bays, with one entrance at the west end and two onto the south aisle. The column capitals of the nave arcade had Doric and Tuscan designs, while the interior and exterior doorways, along with their rectangular clerestory windows, had no ornament. Nothing remains of the bema once located in the center of the nave.

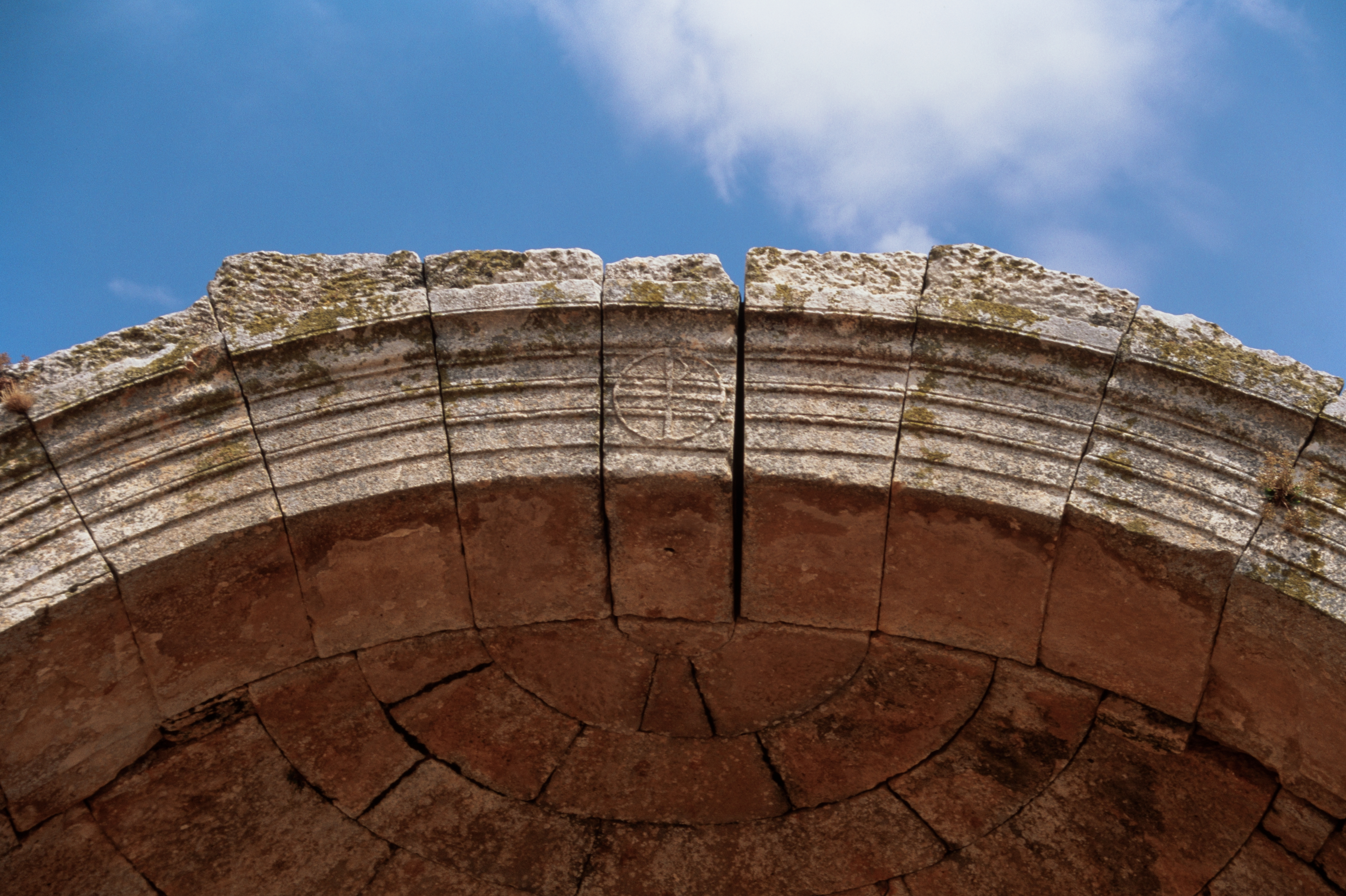
Detail of triumphal arch

== See also ==
- Surqaniya
