= Kimar, Syria =

Kimar كيمار
- Town
- Location within Syria
- Coordinates: 36°25′28″N 36°53′36″E
- Country: Syria
- Governorate: Aleppo
- District: Afrin
- Subdistrict: Afrin

Population (2004 census)
  - Total: 660
- Time zone: UTC+3 (AST)

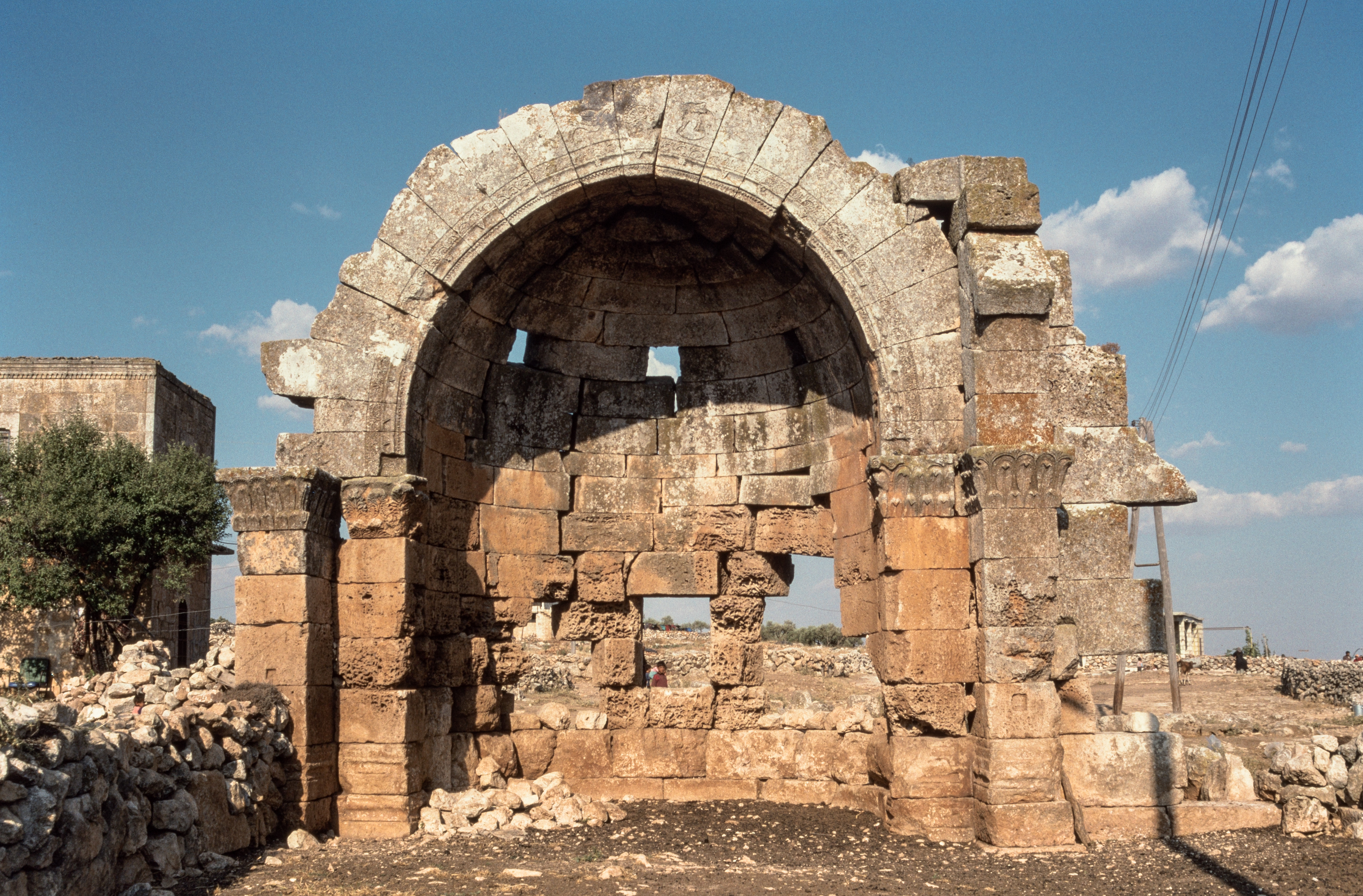
East Church, Kimar, Syria, 2016

Kimar (Arabic: كيمار; Kurdish: Kîmar) is a village in northern Syria, administratively part of the Afrin District of the Aleppo Governorate, located northwest of Aleppo. According to the Syria Central Bureau of Statistics (CBS), it had a population of 660 in the 2004 census.

== Syrian Civil War ==
On 4 May 2022, a Turkish soldier was killed after Kurdish forces shelled a Turkish military vehicle in the village.
