= Afrin District =

Afrin District منطقة عفرين Navçeya Efrînê
- District
- Navçeya Efrînê
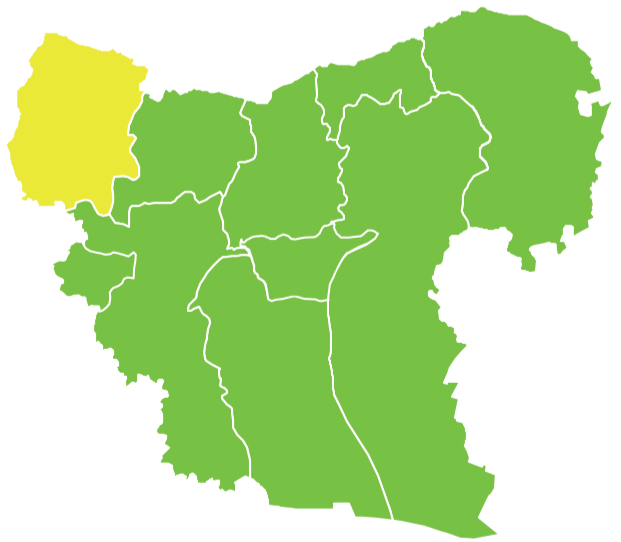
- Location of Afrin District within Aleppo Governorate
- Country: Syria
- Governorate: Aleppo
- Seat: Afrin
- Subdistricts: 7 nawāḥī

Area
  - Total: 1,840.85 km^{2} (710.76 sq mi)

Population (2004)
  - Total: 172,095
  - Density: 93.4867/km^{2} (242.129/sq mi)
- Geocode: SY0203

Afrin District (Arabic: منطقة عفرين, romanized: manṭiqat Afrīn, Kurdish: Navçeya Efrînê) is a district of Aleppo Governorate in northern Syria. The administrative centre is the city of Afrin. At the 2004 census, the district had a population of 172,095.

Afrin District fell under the control of the People's Protection Units (YPG) around 2012 and an "Afrin Canton" was declared in 2014, followed by an "Afrin Region" in 2017. During Operation Olive Branch, the entire district was captured by Turkey and its allies.

== History ==
The area around Afrin developed as the center of a distinctive Sufi Kurdish tradition. In modern post-independence Syria, the Kurdish society of the district was subject to heavy-handed Arabization policies by the Damascus government.

=== Syrian civil war ===
In the course of the Syrian civil war, Damascus government forces pulled back from the district in spring 2012 to give way to the People's Protection Units (YPG) and autonomous self-government under the Autonomous Administration of North and East Syria, which was formally declared on 29 January 2014. Until 2018, violence in Afrin was minor, involving artillery shelling by Jabhat al-Nusra as well as by Turkey.

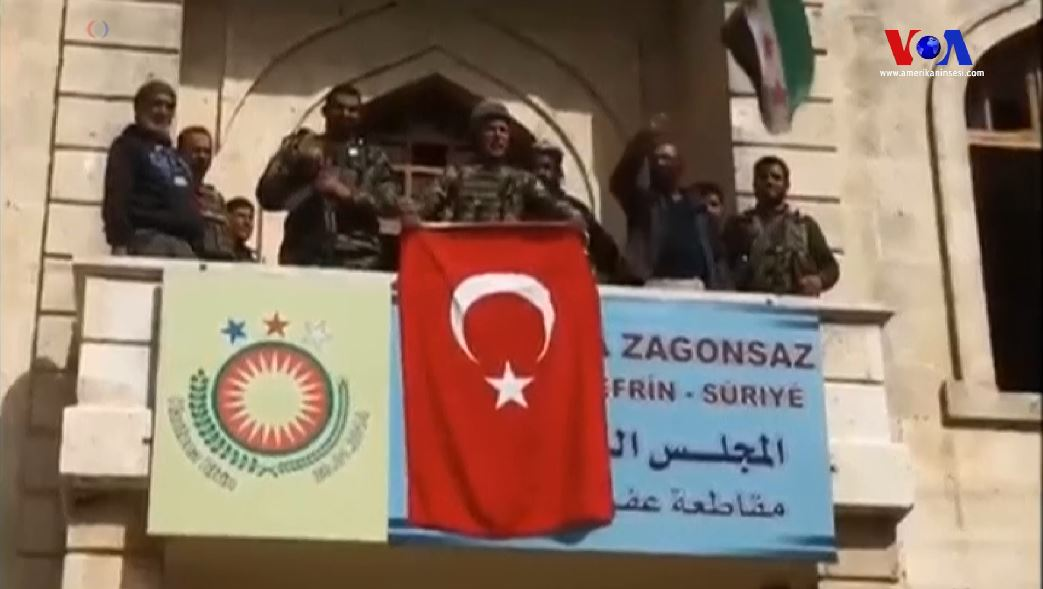
Turkish soldiers and SNA fighters at the building in Afrin that had hosted the PYD-led government of the region, 18 March 2018

Afrin was captured by the Turkish Land Forces and Syrian National Army (SNA) as a result of the 2018 Afrin offensive. Tens of thousands of Kurdish refugees fled from Afrin City before its capture by the SNA in March 2018, and the YPG vowed to retake it. The YPG subsequently announced its intention to start a guerrilla war in Afrin, leading to the SDF insurgency in Northern Aleppo. The region has seen human rights abuses, including kidnappings ethnic cleansing, torture, forced evictions and killings since the start of Turkish occupation in Afrin.

Repression of Kurds continued after the end of the civil war, with Kurds reporting that extortion continued under the caretaker government.

== Demographics ==
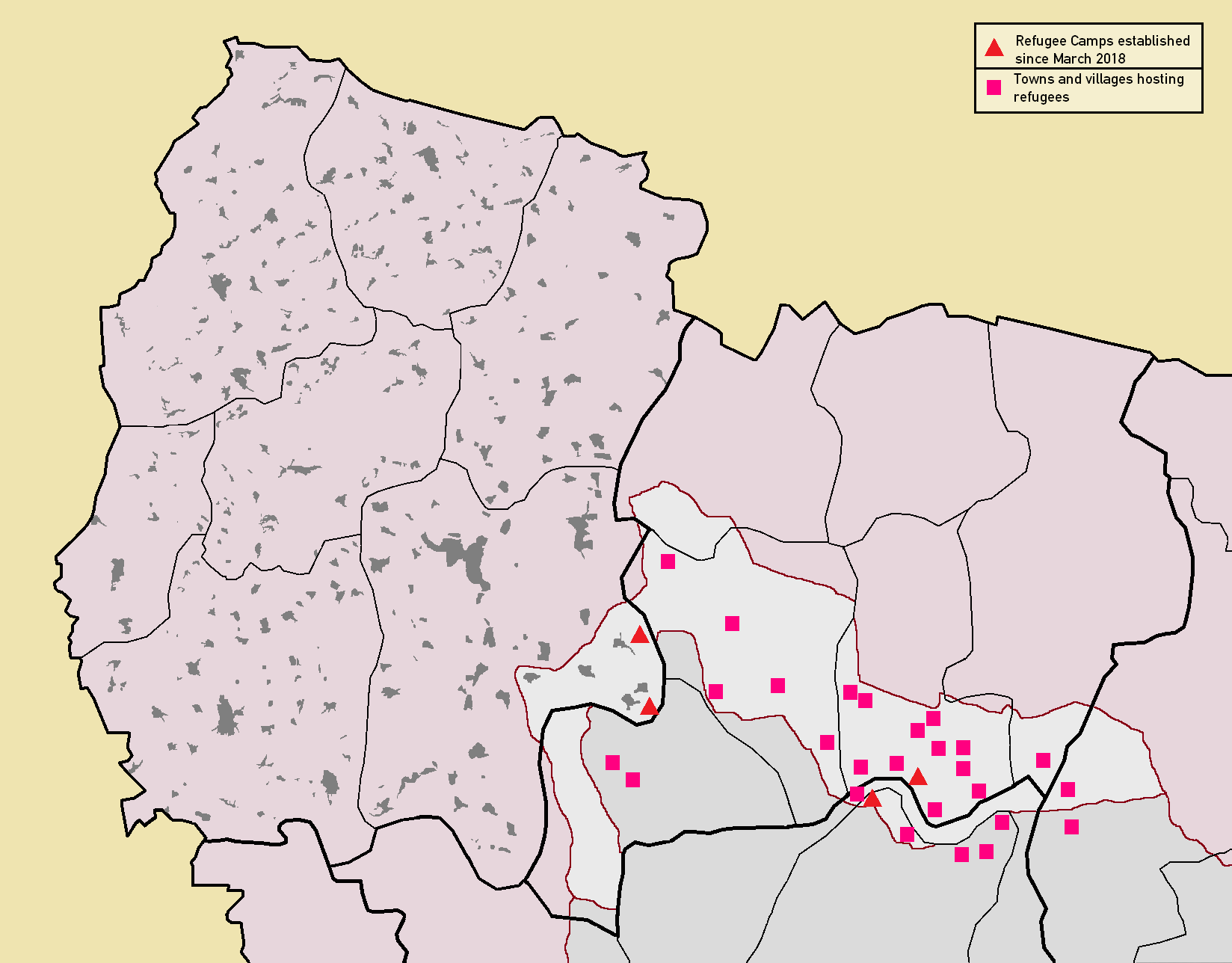
Map of location of settlement of refugees displaced from Afrin due to the Turkish invasion in 2018

In the 1930s, Kurdish Alevis who fled the persecution of the Turkish Armed Forces during the Dersim Massacre, settled in Maabatli in the Afrin District. Prior to the Syrian Civil War, the population of the Afrin District area was overwhelmingly ethnic Kurdish, to the degree that the district had been described as "homogeneously Kurdish". The overall population of Afrin Canton, based on the 2004 Syrian census, was about 200,000.

Cities and towns with more than 10.000 inhabitants according to the 2004 Syrian census are Afrin (36,562) and Jandairis (13,661).

Throughout the course of the Syrian Civil War, the Afrin District served as a safe haven for inbound refugees of all ethnicities. According to a June 2016 estimate from the International Middle East Peace Research Center, about 316,000 displaced Syrians of Kurdish, Yazidi, Arab and Turkmen ethnicity lived in Afrin Canton at the time. After the Turkish-led forces had captured Afrin in early 2018, they began to implement a resettlement policy by moving their mostly Arab fighters and refugees from southern Syria into the empty homes that belonged to displaced locals. The previous owners, most of them Kurds or Yazidis, were often prevented from returning to Afrin. Refugees from Eastern Ghouta, Damascus, told Patrick Cockburn of The Independent that they were part of "an organised demographic change" which was said to replace the Kurdish population of Afrin with an Arab majority.

== Economy ==
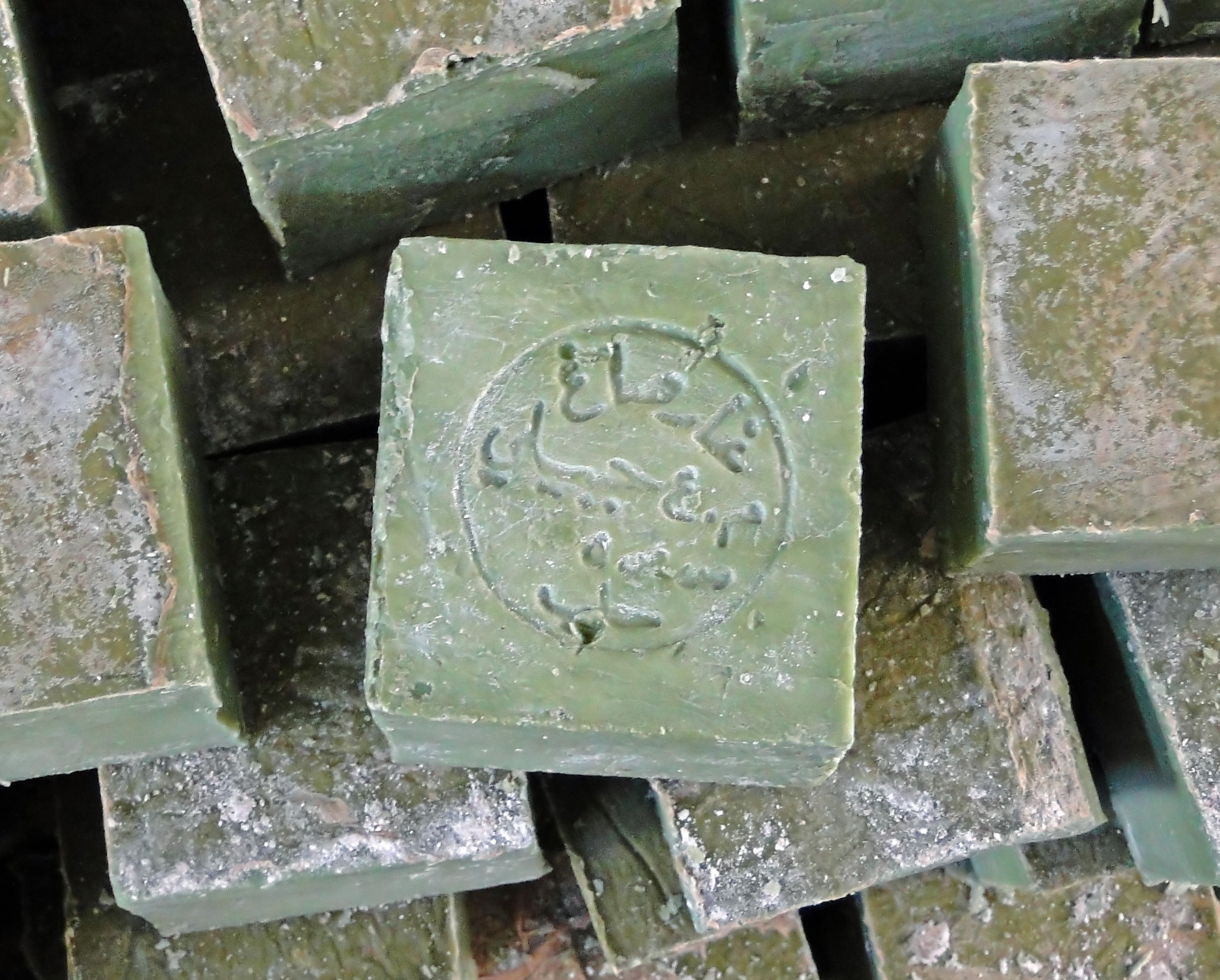
Aleppo soap

A diverse agricultural industry is at the heart of the Afrin District's economy, traditionally olives in particular, and more recently there has been a focus on increasing wheat production. A well-known product from the area is Aleppo soap, a hard soap made from olive oil and lye, distinguished by the inclusion of laurel oil. While the Afrin District has been the source of olive oil for Aleppo soap since antiquity, the destruction caused by the Syrian Civil War to other parts of Aleppo governorate increasingly made the entire production chains locate in Afrin District. At the height of the fighting for Aleppo, up to 50 percent of the city's industrial production was moved to the Afrin District. As of early 2016, two million pairs of jeans were produced per month and exported across Syria. In January 2017, 400 textile industry workshops counted 17,000 employees, supplying the whole of Syria.

In 2015 there were 32 tons of Aleppo soap produced and exported to other parts of Syria, but also to international markets.

=== Tourism ===
Afrin District also served as a center for domestic tourism due to its beautiful landscapes. The tourism was however somewhat constricted due to the YPG's tight control of the borders, and the war; local tourism mostly collapsed during the Turkish invasion of 2018.

== Subdistricts ==
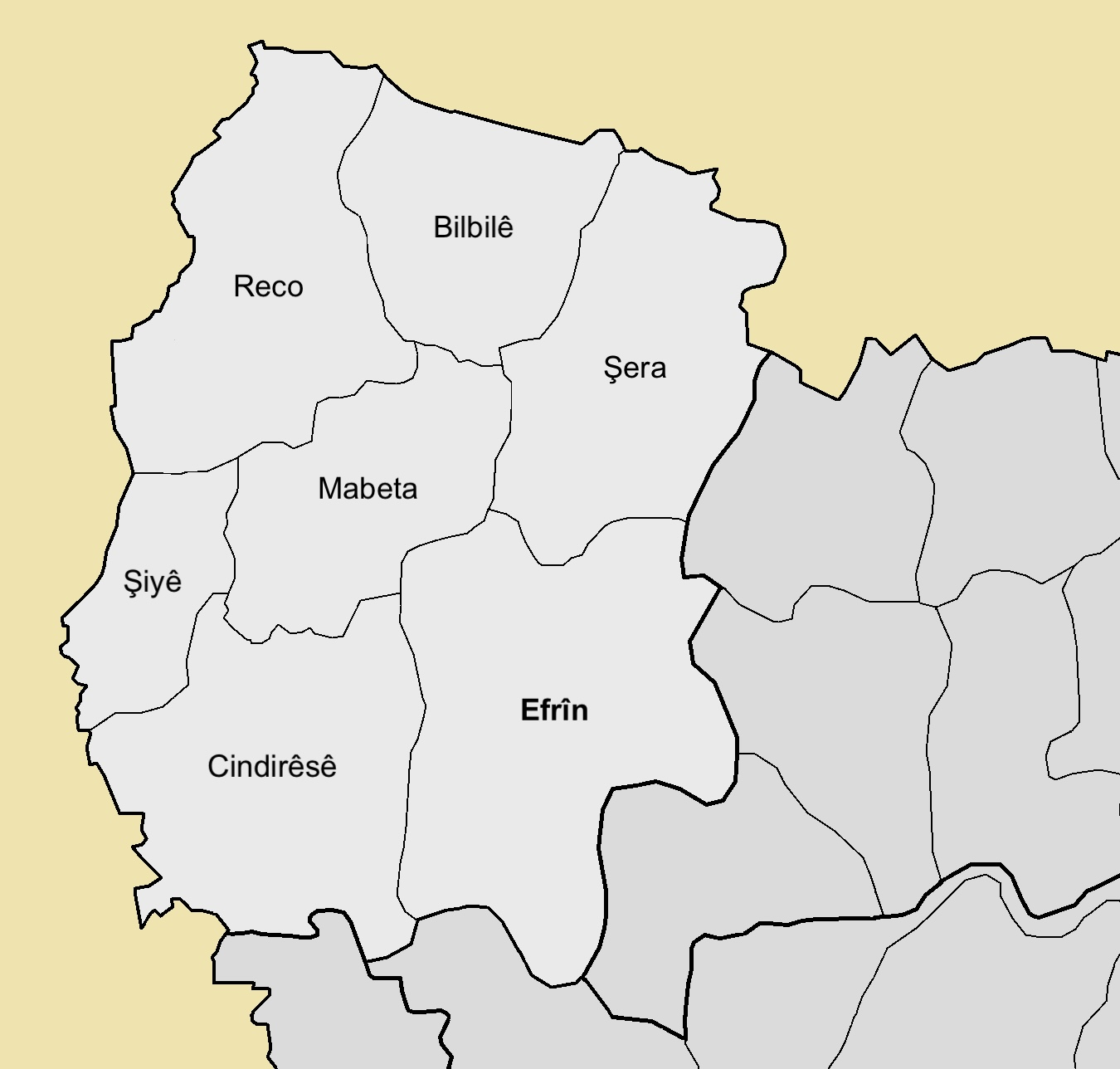
nawāḥī of Afrin District

The district of Afrin is divided into seven subdistricts or nawāḥī (population as of 2004):

Subdistricts of Afrin District
Code	Name	Area	Population	Seat
SY020300	Afrin Subdistrict	427.73 km^{2}	66,188	Afrin
SY020301	Bulbul Subdistrict	203.36 km^{2}	12,573	Bulbul
SY020302	Jindires Subdistrict	319.43 km^{2}	32,947	Jindires
SY020303	Rajo Subdistrict	283.12 km^{2}	21,955	Rajo
SY020304	Sharran Subdistrict	305.18 km^{2}	13,632	Sharran
SY020305	Shaykh al-Hadid Subdistrict	93.52 km^{2}	13,871	Shaykh al-Hadid
SY020306	Maabatli Subdistrict	208.51 km^{2}	11,741	Maabatli

Subdistricts of Afrin District
The administrative center of Afrin Subdistrict shown above is the city of Afrin.

The administrative center of Jindires Subdistrict shown above is the city of Jindires.

The administrative center of Shaykh al-Hadid Subdistrict shown above is the city of Shaykh al-Hadid.

The administrative center of Maabatli Subdistrict shown above is the city of Maabatli.

The administrative center of Sharran Subdistrict shown above is the city of Sharran.

The administrative center of Bulbul Subdistrict shown above is the city of Bulbul.

The administrative center of Rajo Subdistrict shown above is the city of Rajo.
