= Mile Xelîla =

Mile Xelîla مليخليل Malikhli / Malikhlî / منلا خليل / Sheikh Khalil
- Village
- Location of Mile Xelîla in Syria
- Country: Syria
- Governorate: Aleppo Governorate
- District: Afrin District
- Subdistrict: Jindires
- Time zone: UTC+3 (AST)

Mile Xelîla , Kurdish: Mile Xelîla; also known as Malikhli, Manla Khalil or Sheikh Khalil) is a village in the Jindires Subdistrict of Afrin District, Aleppo Governorate, in northern Syria.

== Geography ==
Mile Xelîla is a rural village located in the Afrin region. It lies approximately 14 km from the center of the Jindires area and sits at an elevation of around 125 meters. The village is situated in a valley within the Jindires plain.

== Etymology ==
The village takes its name from its first inhabitant, a person named Khalil, whose religious title in Kurdish was "Manla" (Mullah), hence the name Manla Khalil (Mile Xelîla).

== Economy ==
Like most villages in the Jindires subdistrict, the local economy is based on agriculture, particularly olive cultivation and the growing of grains and other crops typical of the Afrin countryside.

== See also ==
- Kora
- Kafr Safra
- Jindires Subdistrict
- Afrin District
