= Ĥec Ĥesena =

Village in Aleppo Governorate, Syria

Ĥec Ĥesena حەج حەسەنا Haj Hassanli
- Village
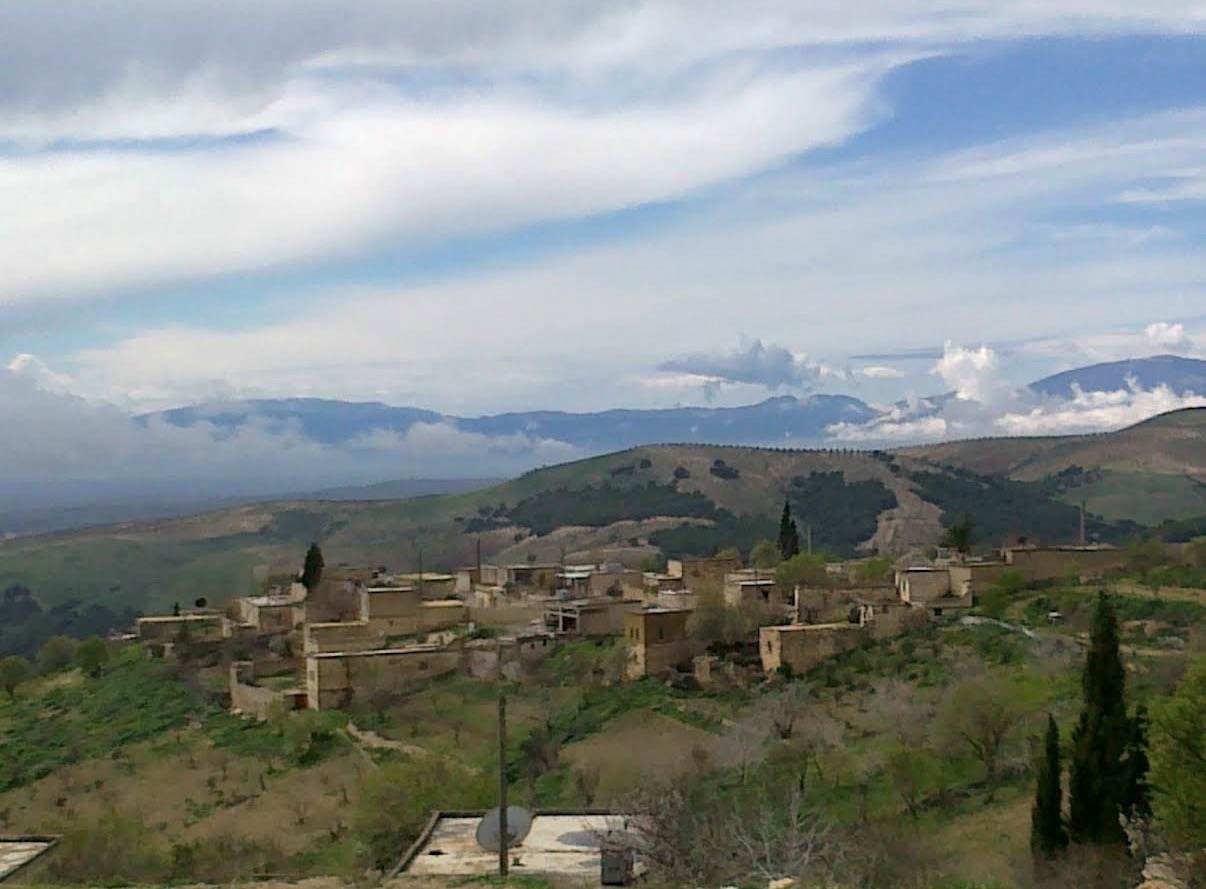

- Location within Syria
- Country: Syria
- Governorate: Aleppo
- District: Afrin District
- Subdistrict: Jindires Subdistrict
- Elevation: 550 m (1,800 ft)

Population (2005 Census)
  - Total: 1,379
- Time zone: UTC+3 (AST)

Ĥec Ĥesena (Kurdish: حەج حەسەنا; Arabic: حاج حسنلي, romanized: Haj Hassanli) is a village in the Jindires Subdistrict of the Afrin District in northwestern Syria. The village is located in the historical Kurd Dagh region of Aleppo Governorate.

== Etymology ==
According to local tradition, the village name derives from its first known inhabitant, Hasan, while Haj was an honorific title associated with him.

== Geography ==
Ĥec Ĥesena is situated on a mountainous slope surrounded by pine and oak forests. Seasonal streams descend from the hills toward the Jurgum valley.

The village lies approximately 12 km from Jindires and around 31 km southwest of Afrin city. Nearby settlements include Kafr Safra, Kora, and Tetera.

== History ==
The village is believed to be approximately 400 years old according to local historical accounts.

Archaeological remains are located south of the village at the site of Khirbat Qasiri, where carved stones, pottery fragments, decorated column capitals, and rock-cut cisterns have been documented.

The wider Afrin region has a long settlement history dating back to the Neolithic and Bronze Age periods.

== Demographics ==
The village historically consisted of approximately 80 houses and had a recorded population of 1,379 inhabitants.

The population is predominantly Kurdish.

Traditional homes were historically constructed from stone and mud-brick with flat wooden roofs, while newer buildings are mainly built from reinforced concrete.

== Economy ==
Agriculture forms the primary economic activity in Ĥec Ĥesena. Olive cultivation is especially important, alongside grains, legumes, figs, grapes, walnuts, and pomegranates.

Livestock breeding, especially sheep and goats, also contributes to the village economy.

== Infrastructure ==
The village contains basic infrastructure including electricity, water services, an elementary school, and road connections to neighboring villages and Jindires.

== Syrian civil war ==
The village and surrounding Afrin countryside were affected by the Turkish-led intervention in Afrin in 2018.

In February 2021, the Syrian Observatory for Human Rights reported that Turkish-backed factions carried out excavations and bulldozing activities at archaeological hills near Haj Hassanli in search of antiquities.

Human rights reports published after 2018 documented allegations of property confiscation, demographic change, and displacement affecting villages in the Afrin region.
