= Buya =

Buya may be,

- Buya (name)
- Buya language (disambiguation)
- Buya people, an ethnic group of South Sudan
- Madam Buya, a Homo erectus fossil found in Eritrea and Ethiopia
- Buyid dynasty or Buyahids (934–1062), a Shia Iranian dynasty founded by the sons of a fisherman named Buya
- Buya, Eritrea, an archaeological site in Eritrea
- The Empire of Buya, a fictional kingdom in Nexus: The Kingdom of the Winds
