= Booya =

Booya or booyah or BOOYAH may refer to:

== People ==
- Abu Mansur Buya, a 10th-century Buyid amir
- Ali ibn Buya, the founder of the 10th century Buyid dynasty in Persia

== Music ==
- Boo-Yaa T.R.I.B.E., a Samoan gangsta rap band

=== Songs ===
- "Booyah" (song), a 2013 song by Showtek
- "Booyah, Here We Go", a 1995 song by Sweetbox

== Society ==
- "Boo-yah!", a catchphrase popularized by sportscaster Stuart Scott in the 1990s
- Buya language (disambiguation), several languages
- Buya people, an ethnic group in the Republic of South Sudan

== Video gaming ==
- BOOYAH! Live, a video game live streaming service provided by Garena, from Jan 2020
- Empire of Buya, a region within the Nexus online role-playing game

== Other uses ==
- Booya (ship), a three–masted schooner which sank during Cyclone Tracy in 1974
- Booyah (stew), a simple chicken and vegetable stew

== See also ==
- Hooyah, a battle-cry used by the United States Navy
