= Yalanqozê =

Yalanqozê يلانقوز Al-Rihan
- Village
- Country: Syria
- Governorate: Aleppo
- Subdistrict: Jindires
- Elevation: 260 m (850 ft)

Population (2005 Census)
  - Total: 1,728

Yalanqozê (Kurdish: Yalanqozê; Arabic: يلانقوز), also known as Al-Rihan (Arabic: الريحان), is a village in the Jindires Subdistrict of the Afrin region in northern Aleppo Governorate, Syria. According to civil registry records at the end of 2005, the village had a population of 1728 inhabitants.

== Economy ==
According to local historical studies, Yalanqozê was founded approximately 400 years ago. Historically, the village was known for agriculture and olive cultivation. Residents traditionally cultivated olives, grains, pomegranates, and walnuts. The village historically contained a primary school, a mosque, telephone services, and olive presses.

== Name ==
The name Yalanqoz is described as being of Turkish origin and interpreted as meaning “the lying spring” or “the lying eye”.

== Geography ==
Yalanqozê lies near the town of Jindires and has gradually become integrated into the surrounding urban area. The village is bordered by agricultural plains and nearby settlements including Kefer Sefrê, Koran, Baflûr, Aşkan Xerbî, Zindikan, Burc Qemûş, and Qîlê.

The village is situated on the southeastern foothills of Kurd Dagh (Çiyayê Kurmênc) and on the plain of Jindires.
