= Feqîra =

Coordinates: 36°28′20″N 36°45′42″E

Feqîra فقيران
- Village
- Country: Syria
- Governorate: Aleppo
- District: Afrin
- Subdistrict: Jindires

Population (2004)
  - Total: 1,706

Feqîra (Kurdish: Feqîra; Arabic: فقيران) is a village in the Jindires Subdistrict of Afrin District, Aleppo Governorate, Syria.

The village is situated approximately 11 km northeast of Jindires and on the southern slopes of Mount Kurkê. Local sources describe it as one of the larger villages of the area and historically an Ezidi-inhabited settlement. The village is also known by the alternative names Qerebaş (قره باش) and Ras al-Aswad (رأس الأسود). According to the 2004 census, Feqîra had a population of 1706 inhabitants.
