= Kora, Jindires =

Kora كورا Koura / Kura / Koran
- Village
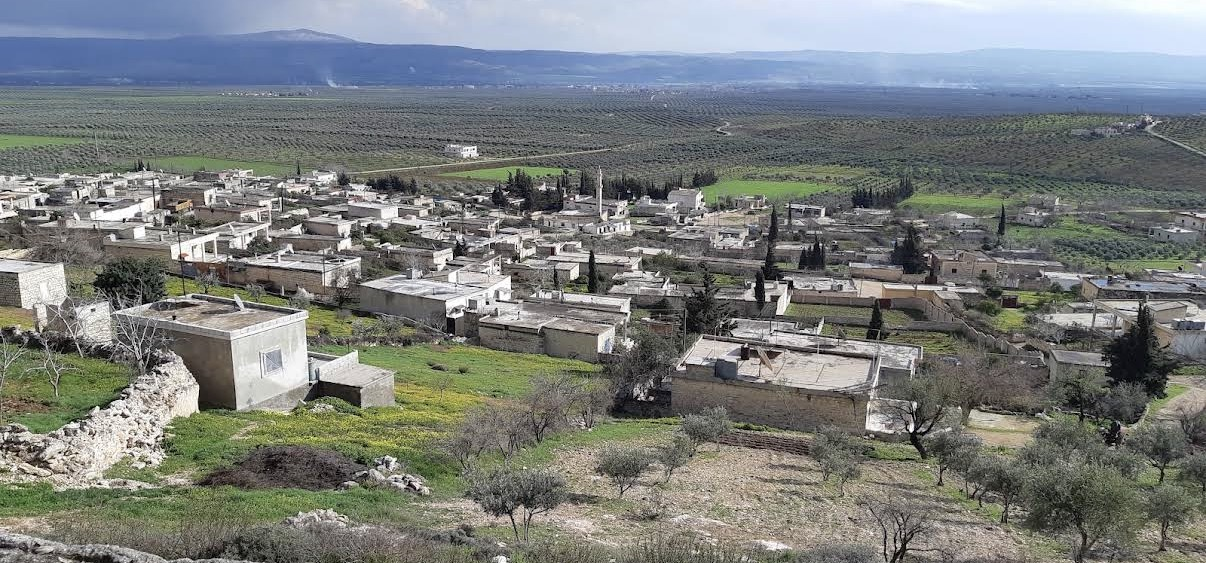
- Aerial view of Kora

- Location of Kora in Syria
- Coordinates: 36.4392°N 36.6728°E
- Country: Syria
- Governorate: Aleppo Governorate
- District: Afrin District
- Subdistrict: Jindires

Population (2005 Census)
  - Total: 1,861
- Time zone: UTC+3 (AST)
- Geocode: C3504

Kora (Arabic: كورا also spelled Koura or Koran) is a village in the Jindires Subdistrict of Afrin District, Aleppo Governorate, northern Syria. According to civil registry records at the end of 2005, The village had a population of 1861 inhabitants.

== Geography ==
Kora is a small village situated at the southeastern foot of Mount Damouk (also known as Qazqali), where the mountain slope meets the start of the Jindires plain. The area is known for its fertile alluvial soil and rich groundwater. It lies roughly 6 km north of Jindires town and approximately 1 km east of Kafr Safra. To the North, Tetera, Hêc Hêsena and Yalanqozê are also within close distance.

The village shows evidence of ancient settlements, including scattered remains of old walls, columns, building foundations, and a water well dating to the Roman period.

== Name ==
The name Kora is thought to originate from the village's relatively low-lying position. The same name is also used by a Kurdish tribe located in Kermanshah in eastern Kurdistan as well as in the Kars region.

== Demographics and economy ==
The village historically contained around 160 houses. Older homes were traditionally built of stone and mud with flat wooden roofs, while newer constructions use concrete. Kora is served by electricity, a public water network, an elementary school, a mosque, and five modern olive presses.

Agriculture forms the main economic activity. The village has long been known for olive production and also grows grains, legumes, summer vegetables, cotton, sugar beets, pomegranates, apples, and apricots. Livestock raising, particularly sheep and goats, is also common.
