= Bircikê =

- برج كموش
- Interactive map of Bircikê
- Country: Syria
- Governorate: Aleppo
- District: Afrin
- Nahiyah: Jindires
- Time zone: UTC+3
- Geocode: C1428

Bircikê (Arabic: برج كموش, Kurdish: Bircikê) is a Kurdish village administratively part of the Jindires Subdistrict, Afrin District, Aleppo Governorate, in northwestern Syria. The village had a population of 89 according to the 2004 census, and 637 according to civil registry records at the end of 2005.
