= Doe-kid separation =

Practice of separating kids and mothers

Doe-kid separation is the practice of separating kids from their mothers in goat farming. It is a near-universal practice amongst farmers globally. It is usually done in 2–4 months. It can be done gradually or abruptly.

== Background ==
The female goat, or doe, is typically bred for the first time depends on when she reaches sexual maturity, which can be anywhere from 5–8 months of age. When it is time to wean a kid, the kid is moved to another pasture. When a doe has twins, a farmer may move one twin to another pasture and allow the other twin to remain with the mother. The general rule of thumb is to separate kids from does once the kid is 2 1/2 to 3 times its birth weight. Male kids are always separated from their mothers, as leaving them with their mothers can result in unintentional inbreeding. Some kids are sent to slaughter as soon as they are weaned.

== Early vs late separation ==
Early separation is defined as separating kids from their mothers before they are weaned (<10 weeks). A study conducted found that pre-weaned kids separated from mothers in groups of same‐age peers expressed different social behaviors compared with pre-weaned kids kept with their mothers. Pre-weaned kids kept with same‐age peers spent less time resting alone and showed less allogrooming, but play‐fought, raced, stepped‐on each other, and stood in contact with each other more than the pre-weaned kids kept with their mothers. These differences were not found after weaning, suggesting that the presence of adults and experiencing maternal care decreases play‐fight and increases allogrooming in kids kept with their dams. However, after weaning and mixing rearing treatments with each other, Pre-weaned kids kept with their dams ended up initiating more and receiving less agonistic interactions than pre-weaned kids kept with same‐age peers, but this difference vanished across weeks, suggesting that pre-weaned kids reared with same‐age peers changed their social behavior after being in contact with pre-weaned kids kept with their dams.

== Methods ==
=== Group pasture weaning ===
This method of separation involves removing kids from the pasture and taking them to a distant paddock where they cannot see or hear their mothers.

=== Fence-line weaning ===
This method of separation involves keeping does and kids on opposite sides of a fence. This reduces stress by allowing does and kids to see and hear each other after separation.

== See also ==
- Artificial insemination
