= Tetera, Jindires =

Village in Aleppo Governorate, Syria

Tatar Tetera
- Village
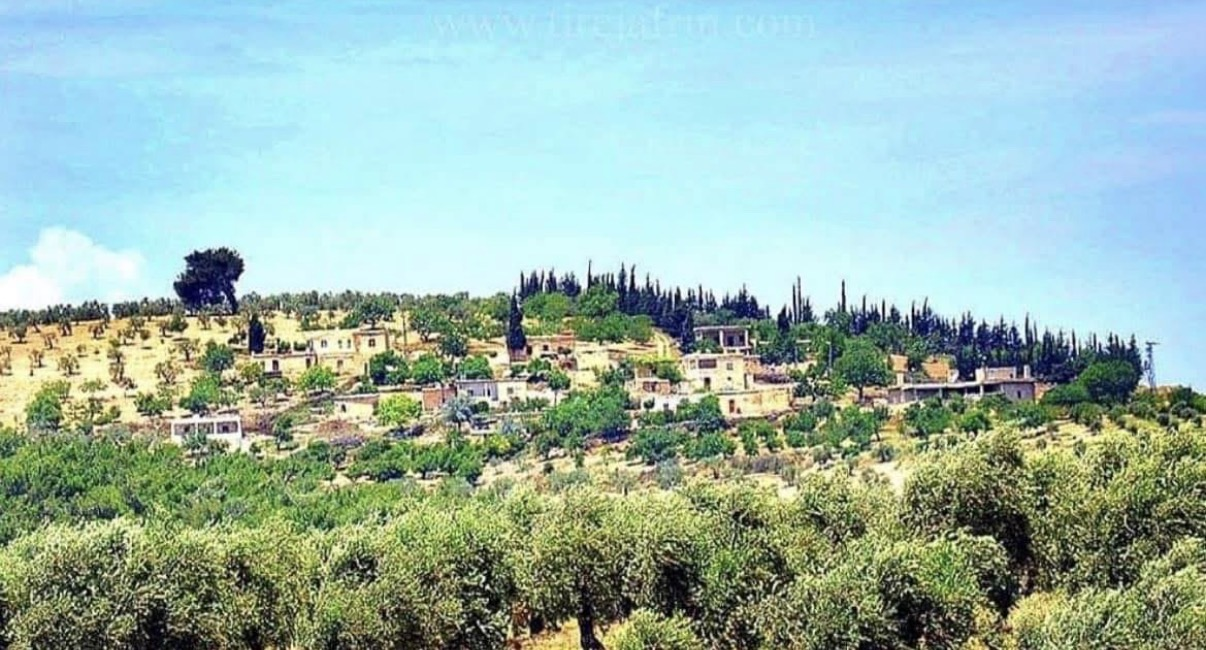
- Aerial view of Tatar

- Location within Syria
- Coordinates: 36.460448°N 36.644979°E
- Country: Syria
- Governorate: Aleppo
- District: Afrin
- Subdistrict: Jindires

Population (2005 Census)
  - Total: 640
- Time zone: UTC+3 (AST)

Tatar (formerly Tataranli; Kurdish: Tetera) is a Syrian village administratively belonging to the Jindires Subdistrict of the Afrin District in Aleppo Governorate, northern Syria. According to the civil registry records at the end of 2005, the village had a population of 640 inhabitants.

== Economy ==
The local economy is primarily based on rain-fed agriculture, particularly the cultivation of olives, grapes, pomegranates, and apricots, in addition to sheep and goat herding. Administratively, the village is considered part of Kafr Safra.

== History ==
The Village consists of around 15 houses and is estimated to be approximately 150 years old. Older homes were traditionally built of stone and mud with flat wooden roofs, while newer houses are constructed from concrete and are located along the village’s main road. The village is connected to Jindires and nearby settlements by a paved road and is supplied with an electricity network.
