= Cûmê =

- جوم
- Interactive map of Cûmê
- Country: Syria
- Governorate: Aleppo
- District: Afrin
- Nahiyah: Jindires
- Time zone: UTC+3
- Geocode: C1421

Cûmê (Arabic: جوم, Kurdish: Çeqelê Cûmê), formerly known as Çeqelê Cûmê, is a Kurdish village administratively part of the Jindires Subdistrict, Afrin District, Aleppo Governorate, in northwestern Syria. The village had a population of 346 according to the 2004 census, and 1,205 according to civil registry records at the end of 2005.

== Name ==
The name Çeqelê Cûmê derives from the Kurdish Jaqalli tribe. The addition of Cûm refers to the Cûmê plain, and was added to distinguish the village from others bearing the same name according to Dr. Muhammad Abdo Ali.
