= Agitu Ideo Gudeta =

Ethiopian farmer, entrepreneur, and environmentalist (1978–2020)

- Aggituu Guddataa
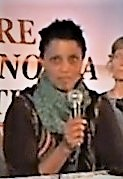
- Gudeta in 2016
- Born: 1 January 1978; Addis Ababa, Ethiopia
- Died: 29 December 2020 (aged 42); Plankerhoff, Frassilongo, Italy
- Education: University of Trento
- Occupations: Farmer, Entrepreneur, Environmentalist
- Title: Referred to as the Queen of Happy Goats

Agitu Ideo Gudeta (Oromo: Aggituu Ida'o Guddataa; Amharic: አጊቱ ጉደታ; 1 January 1978 – 29 December 2020) was an Ethiopian Oromo farmer, entrepreneur, and environmentalist who immigrated to Italy after experiencing conflict due to her political activism against land grabbing by the military for international corporations. She established a goat farming operation using the indigenous breed Pezzata Mòchena to produce dairy and beauty products. Gudeta became a national symbol of environmentalism and successful refugee integration into Italian society by the press and politicians. She was murdered in December of 2020; Adams Suleiman, a Ghanaian seasonal worker she had hired, was charged with raping and murdering her.

== Early life and education ==
Agitu Ideo Gudeta was born on 1 January 1978 in Addis Ababa. She learned farming techniques from her grandparents who lived in the countryside. Gudeta graduated from the University of Trento with a degree in sociology.

== Career ==
Gudeta returned to Ethiopia to work on sustainable agriculture initiatives. She led projects to organize farmers and decrease workloads through training, education, and machinery. Her aim was to ensure adequate incomes. Gudeta became a political activist involved in protests in Addis Ababa against unregulated industrialization and land grabbing by the government of Ethiopia on behalf of international corporations.

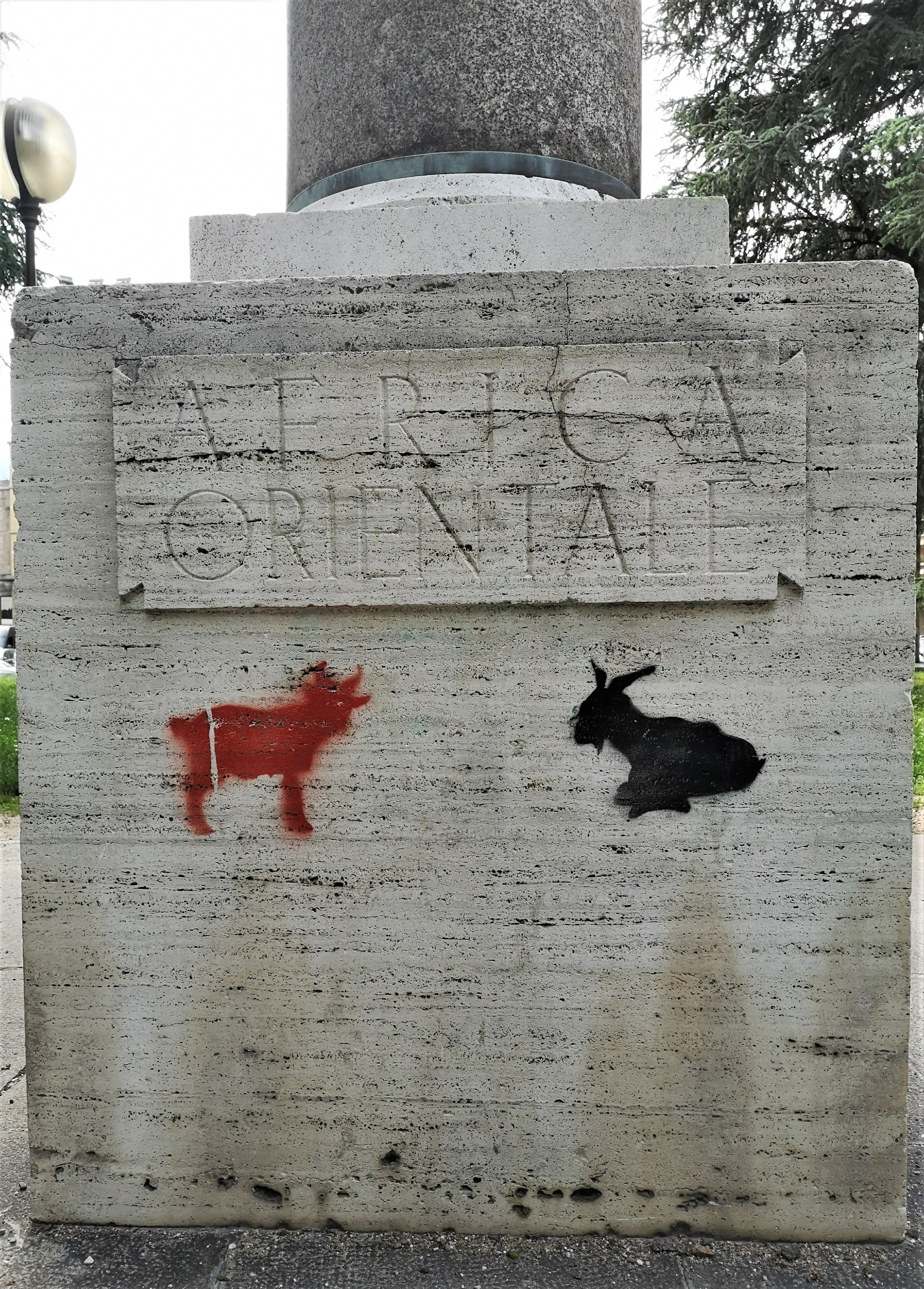
Detail of the fascist column of 1938 behind the Bozen-Bolzano Monument to Victory with Yekatit 12 graffiti honoring also the Agitu Gudeta memory through her goats

Fleeing the conflict in 2010, Gudeta immigrated as a refugee to Trentino. After researching local agriculture resources, she established, first in Val di Gresta and then in Valle dei Mocheni, La Capra Felice (The happy goat), a goat farm on common land that was previously abandoned. She studied how to make goat cheese in France. Her farm produced dairy and beauty products made from the indigenous breed, Pezzata Mòchena. Gudeta started with 15 goats before expanding the agricultural operation to 180 animals by 2018. Her life and farm is the subject of a Deutsche Welle documentary. In June 2020, she opened her first store, Bottega della Capra Felice, in Piazza Venezia (Trento).

== Awards and honors ==
Gudeta became a national symbol of environmentalism and successful refugee integration in Italy after being lauded by politician Emma Bonino. In 2019, she was a nominee for the Luisa Minazzi-Environmentalist of the Year prize by Legambiente. She was sometimes referred by the media as "La Regina delle Capre Felici" ("the Queen of Happy Goats").

== Personal life ==
As of 2020, she lived in an apartment next to the church in Plankerhoff, a German-speaking hamlet near Frassilongo. She was friendly with writer and performer Gabriella Ghermandi.

== Murder ==
On 29 December 2020, Gudeta was killed, aged 42, in her apartment from blows to her head with a hammer, after suffering an attempt of sexual violence (she was found half naked). The autopsy later revealed that there were no signs of sexual violence. Her body was discovered by neighbours after she missed a business appointment. Adams Suleiman, a Ghanaian seasonal worker she had hired, was arrested and charged with murder.

After her death, the Ethiopian ambassador to Italy, Zenebu Tadesse, traveled to Trentino to work with the Ministry of Foreign Affairs. The United Nations High Commissioner for Refugees expressed remorse and stated that Gudeta "demonstrated how refugees can contribute to the societies that host them...Despite her tragic end, the UNHCR hopes that Agitu Ideo Gudeta will be remembered and celebrated as a model of success and integration and inspire refugees that struggle to rebuild their lives".

== Documentary ==
- Making cheese in the Alps – a story of integration, Deutsche Welle Documentary - 2019
