= Gudeta =

Gudeta is a surname. Notable people with the surname include:

- Netsanet Gudeta (born 1991), Ethiopian long-distance runner
- Agitu Ideo Gudeta (1978−2020), Ethiopian farmer, entrepreneur, and environmentalist
