= Kafr Safra =

Kafr Safra كفر صفرة
- Town
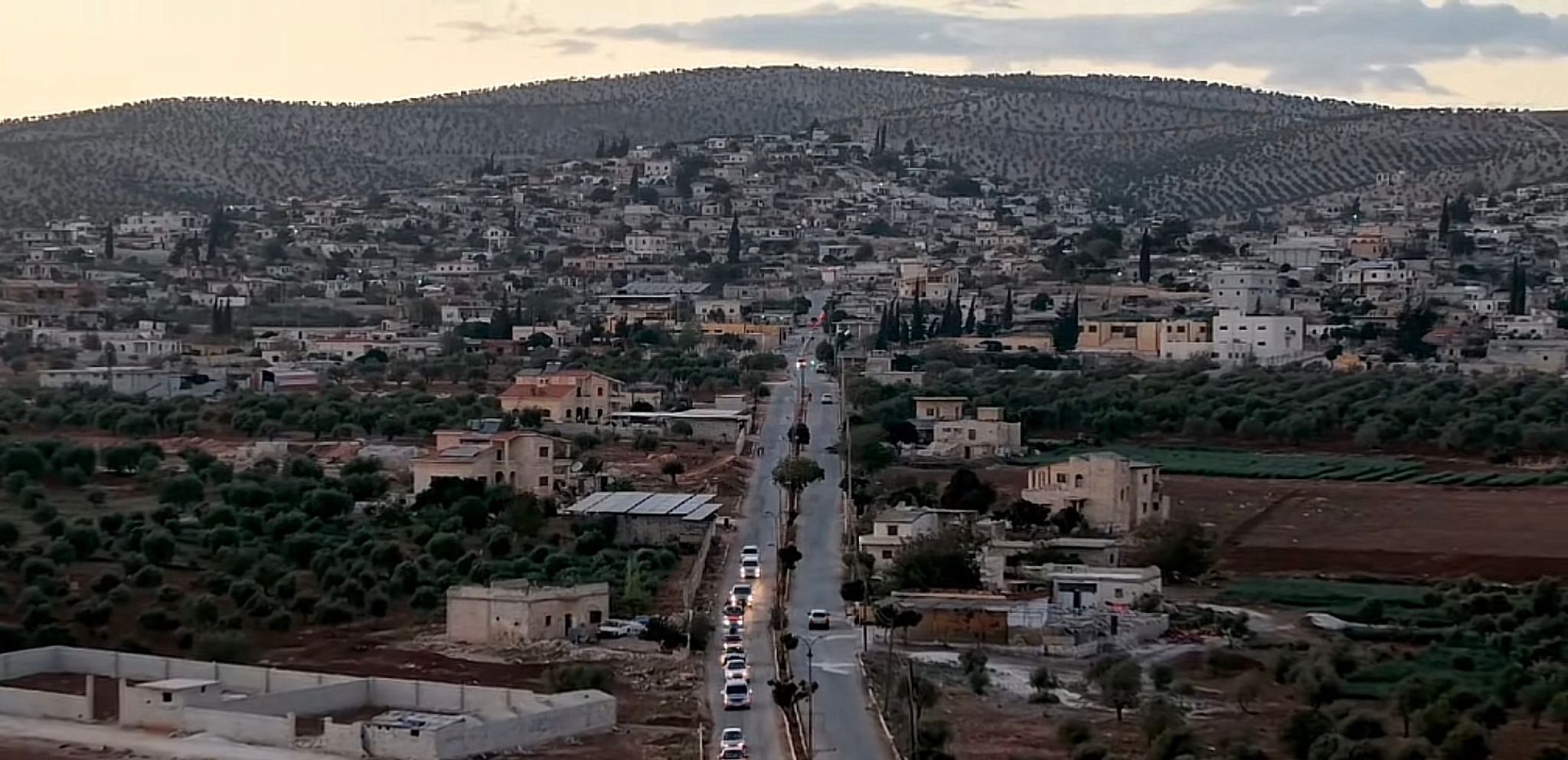

- Location within Syria
- Coordinates: 5000) 36°25′37″N 36°39′43″E
- Country: Syria
- Governorate: Aleppo
- District: Afrin
- Subdistrict: Jindires

Population (2004 census, 2025 News Report),
  - Total: 2,150- 5,000
- Time zone: UTC+3 (AST)

Kafr Safra (Arabic: كفر صفرة, also spelled Kafar Safra; Kurdish: Kefersefrê) is a village in northern Syria, administratively part of the Afrin District of the Aleppo Governorate, located northwest of Aleppo. Nearby localities include Shaykh al-Hadid, Tetera, Kora and Hêc Hêsena to the north, Qarah Bash to the east, Yalanqozê and Jindires to the south. According to the Syria Central Bureau of Statistics (CBS), Kafr Safra had a population of 2,150 in the 2004 census. As of 2025, Kafr Safr had a population of roughly 5,000 people. It was taken over by the Turkish military and its proxy, the "Syrian National Army," in March 2018. Hayat Tahrir al-Sham briefly seized control of the town in October 2022.

== Demographics ==
In late 19th century, German orientalist Martin Hartmann noted Kafr Safra as a settlement with 10 houses inhabited by Kurds.

== Name ==
The Name of the village of Kafr Safr Is Stated to have deep linguistic meaning, The word "Safra" in the Ancient Language Aramaic means morning or bird, However the Word "Kafr" refers to a village and therefore the full meaning is the morning or the village of the bird, Ultimately reflecting its ancient ties.

== Notable people ==
Mohammed Murad Murad, from the prominent Murad Agha family in Kafr Safra, was a member of the Syrian Parliament, He received this role through his older brother Abdul Rahman Murad Murad. Mohammad than served in the years of 1977 and ran his second term in 1981. He Later on also served as the former mayor of Kafr Safra.

== Economy ==
The economy in Kafr Safra mainly revolves around agriculture, with most residents involved in cultivating olives, grains, legumes, and pomegranates. Irrigation is sustained by artesian wells, and livestock farming provides an additional source of income for the community.

== Modern Era ==
In the summer of 2012, during the Syrian Civil War, Kafr Safra was taken by the People's Protection Units (YPG), After Assad's regime withdrew to concentrate on the conflict in its capital, Damascus.

On 8 March 2018, Kafr Safra was seized by the Turkish Armed Forces and their allies the Syrian National Army from the YPG. Jindires was also captured on the same day during Operation Olive Branch. Hayat Tahrir al-Sham briefy Seized control of the town in October 2022 Following fierce clashes between armed factions of the SNA.

During the occupation of the Turkish Armed Forces and its proxies, extensive uprooting of Olive trees occurred in the village.

Additionally, the uprooting of hundreds of trees occurred near the Village to make way for the construction of illegal settlements in order to rehouse Syrian Families.

== History ==
The History of the Village can be traced back to two Êzîdî brothers, Îzîd Xelo and Memo. According to local oral tradition, the brothers were in the service of a noblewoman known as the Xatûn Cindirêsê. When raiders stole the Xatûn's livestock, the brothers joined her guards in pursuit. They caught up with the thieves at Bîrê Rikê, a well near the village of Kûra. In the ensuing skirmish, the bandit leader Ba Dirle Xelo was killed. The brothers recovered the stolen livestock and returned them to the Xatûn. In recognition of their bravery and loyalty, she granted them large land areas stretching from the Cindirêsê to Tetera.

The family's early ancestors initially settled in rock-cut dwellings known locally as şikest, which residents traditionally attribute to the Roman period. Over time, the settlement expanded considerably. Descendants of one of the two brothers later moved to Yalanqozê, while the other branch settled in Tetera. The main settlement of Kefersefrê continued to grow and eventually reached approximately 600 households. The current population of the village consists primarily of descendants of these two founding brothers, along with families who migrated later from Xêrî, Yalanqozê , and Tetera.

== Additional Photos ==
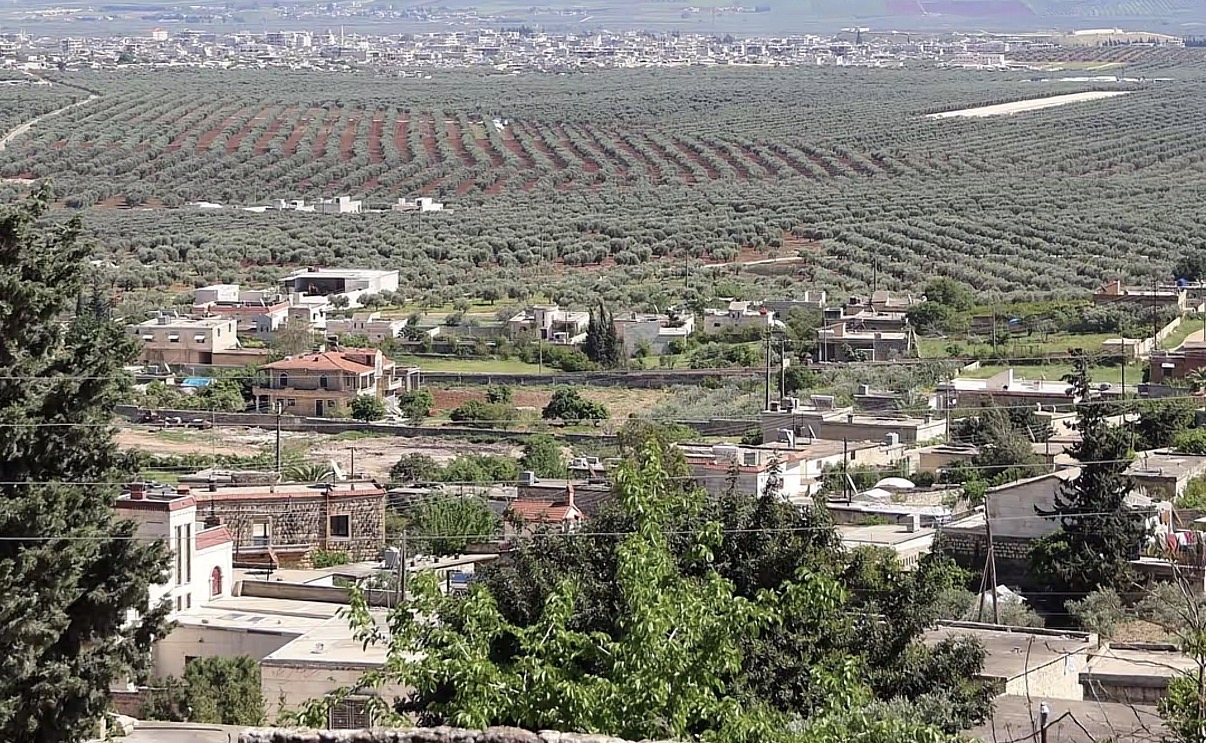

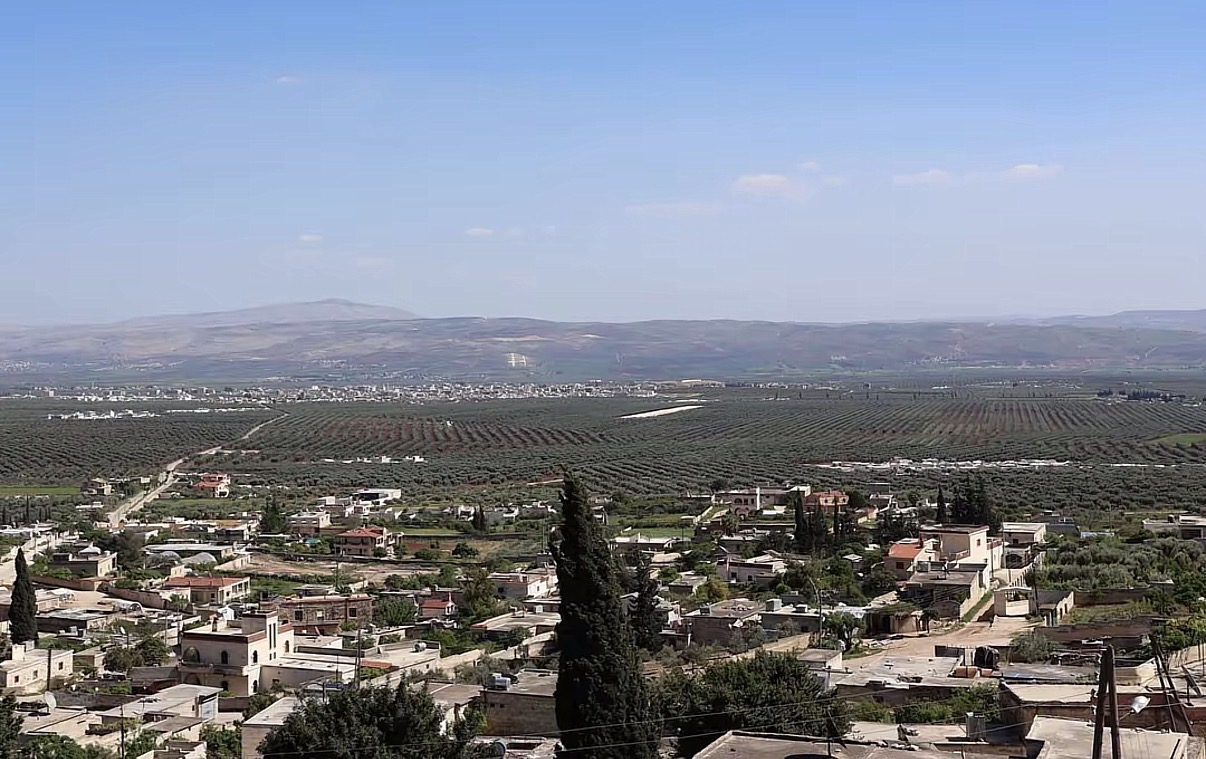
