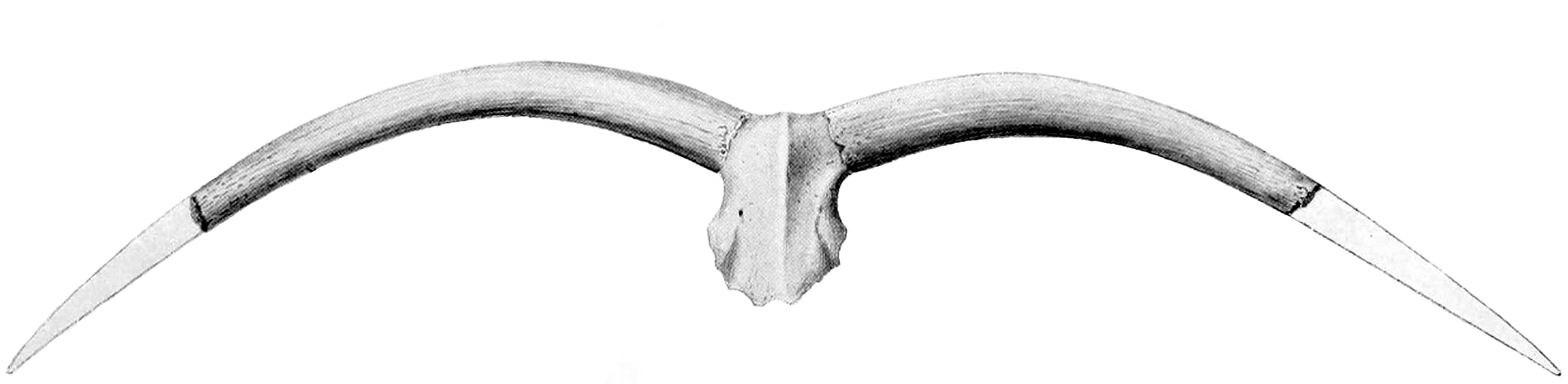
- Bos acutifrons skull

Scientific classification
- Kingdom: Animalia
- Phylum: Chordata
- Class: Mammalia
- Order: Artiodactyla
- Family: Bovidae
- Subfamily: Bovinae
- Genus: Bos
- Species: †B. acutifrons

Binomial name
- †Bos acutifrons Lydekker, 1877

Synonyms
- Bos planifrons

= Bos acutifrons =

Bos acutifrons Temporal range: Middle Pleistocene

Extinct species of mammal

Bos acutifrons is the most ancient representative of the genus Bos cattle. Fossils of an individual of B. acutifrons were found in middle Pleistocene-aged strata of Siwalik Hills of Kashmir, in either modern Pakistan or India, in the 19th century. The prehistoric species was described, along with Bos planifrons, by Richard Lydekker in 1877. In 1898 Lydekker synonymised B. planifrons with B. acutifrons, reconsidering the skull found to be that of a female individual of the same species.

Edwin H. Colbert in 1935 first suggested that from this species the modern species of Bos arose, with the aurochs, B. primigenius, the ancestors of modern taurine cattle, evolving from the Indian subcontinent via B. namadicus, a smallish prehistoric species of cattle described by Hugh Falconer in 1837 from a fossil recovered in the early 19th century from Narbada (known at the time as Narmada by the British Raj) in central India. B. namadicus and B. primigenius are thought to have split 0.61 and 0.85 million years ago based on a study of the accumulation of differences in mitochondrial DNA by MacHugh et al. in 1997, with Badam and Sankhyan in 2009 dating the existence of B. namadicus to the middle to late Pleistocene. Colbert's theory was expanded by Pilgrim in 1947 and followed by subsequent authors, until 2007 when Bienvenido Martínez-Navarro et al. proposed an alternative theory that Bos in general and B. primigenius in particular arose in Africa. Following the 2009 discovery of the remains an African species of Bos in Eritrea, B. buiaensis, which also immigrated into the Levant, this theory gained currency based on morphological and chronological grounds. Conversely, the presence of B. primigenius remains in the Levant which pre-date the earliest remains of both B. buiaensis and B. namadicus, as presented by Ofer Bar-Yosef and Miriam Belmaker in 2011, cast doubt upon this 'out-of-Africa' theory as well as the theory that aurochs developed from B. namadicus.

The species B. acutifrons first appeared in the early Pleistocene, some 2.58 million years ago at the earliest, and died out around 1 million years ago. Duvernois in 1990 proposed it evolved directly from an Indian species of Leptobos, perhaps L. falconeri, along with the Pleistocene genera or subgenera Bison and Bibos. Martínez-Navarro et al. consider that the Bos genus most likely arose in Africa descended from Pelorovis oldowayensis, described by Hans Reck in 1928 from Olduvai Gorge, Tanzania, which was itself derived from the older species P. turkanensis described from northern Kenya. Both Pelorovis species were moved to genus Bos by Martínez-Navarro et al. in 2014, which would make the oldest Bos species African.

Tong et al. in 2018 also call the Martínez-Navarro hypothesis into question, pointing out that there are good morphological ground to separate the genus Pelorovis from Bos, which would invalidate the theory.
