= Qîlê =

- قيلة
- Interactive map of Qîlê
- Country: Syria
- Governorate: Aleppo
- District: Afrin
- Nahiyah: Jindires
- Time zone: UTC+3

Qîlê (Arabic: قيلة, Kurdish: Qîlê) is a Kurdish village administratively part of the Jindires Subdistrict, Afrin District, Aleppo Governorate, in northwestern Syria. The village had a population of 547 according to civil registry records at the end of 2005.
