= Muhammad Murad Murad =

Syrian politician

- محمد مراد مراد
- Born: Kafr Safra, Aleppo Governorate, Syria
- Citizenship: Syrian
- Occupation: Politician
- Known for: Member of the People's Assembly of Syria

Muhammad Murad Murad (Arabic: محمد مراد مراد) is a Syrian politician from the village of Kafr Safra in the Afrin District, Aleppo Governorate. He served as a member of the People's Assembly of Syria representing the Aleppo Governorate countryside.

== Parliamentary career ==
Murad was elected in the 1977 parliamentary elections in the workers and peasants sector and officially named a winner by Presidential Decree No. 1655 dated 5 August 1977.

He was re-elected in the 1981 parliamentary elections and confirmed among the winning candidates for the 1981–1985 term by Presidential Decree No. 584 dated 11 November 1981.

== See also ==
- People's Assembly of Syria
- Kafr Safra
- Afrin District
- Aleppo Governorate
