= Bos buiaensis =

Bos buiaensis Temporal range: Pleistocene epoch

Scientific classification
- Kingdom: Animalia
- Phylum: Chordata
- Class: Mammalia
- Infraclass: Placentalia
- Order: Artiodactyla
- Family: Bovidae
- Subfamily: Bovinae
- Genus: Bos
- Species: †B. buiaensis

Binomial name
- †Bos buiaensis Martínez-Navarro et al., 2010

Extinct African bovid species

Bos buiaensis is an extinct species of cattle. The species is known from a million year old skull fossil found at the archaeological site of Buya, Eritrea in 2003. It was reassembled by excavators from over one hundred shards.

The fossil found at Buya had a wider and more robust cranium than those found in Pelorvis oldowayensis and Pelorvis turkanensis, fossils, but it was smaller than auroch skulls. Like the Pelorvis fossils, it has less pronounced postorbital constriction than in auroch or Bos acutifrons fossils. The frontside of the eye sockets is located above backside edge of the last molar. This feature is characteristic of Pelorvis sensu stricto fossils. Although, its snout is just as high and wide as those of aurochs. Its cranium contained pneumatic elements on its frontal side which extended to cover the occipital and parietal areas. Its horns extend backward, before curving outwards, then forward and upward. It had a short and robust pedicle, and was stout at the apical. Evidence of human activity was also found at the site, indicating that humans have been eating bull since the origins of the human species. Another example of Bos buiaensis was unearthed at the Buya area. This fossil contained a nearly complete neurocranium with persevered occipital and parietal bones, as well as intact horns. Its features were similar to the 2003 Buya fossil. One Bos buiaensis fossil was unearthed in Gesher Benot Ya'aqov.

The fossils displayed characteristics of ancient Pleistocene African Pelorovis fossils and of Eurasian Auroch fossils. Because of these shared characteristics, some researchers considered it to be a chronospecies proving the evolution of the African Pelorovis genus into the modern bos genus. Examples of this species found in areas such as Gesher Benot Ya'aqov may indicate that it evolved in Africa, and then spread out northwards.

This interpretation has been criticized by other scholars. Whereas cladograms showcase numerous morphological similarities between Pelorvis and Bos skeletons, more detailed morphological analyses have suggested these creatures are more distinct. Indicating they are not biologically connected. In all species of Bos the horns curve upwards, and in some species forwards. However, in Pelorvis fossils the horn cores are directed backwards. There is also significantly less postorbital constriction present in Pelorvis skulls than in auroch skulls. Pelorvis metacarpal bones much shorter and more robust than those of Bos. The eye sockets of Pelorvis skulls are also distinct from those of Bos. Such morphological differences imply the species are not closely related. Academics have argued that if the African Bos buiaensis species was the ancestor of all modern Eurasian bull species, it would mean that these animals evolved in Africa, not Asia. However, genetic evidence suggests that modern bull species evolved in Asia. The fossil record also showcases the presence of bulls in Eurasia prior to the date of the Bos buiaensis. Which demonstrates that bulls were already present in that area in the world, and could not have evolved from migrating Bos buiaensis.
