= Buya, Eritrea =

Archaeological site in Eritrea

Buya or Buia is an archaeological site in the Danakil Depression of Eritrea. It is known for the discovery of Madam Buya, a one million-year-old fossil of a Homo erectus skull. Two other expeditions in 2011 and 2012 also unearthed ancient hominid fossils at the site. Archaeologists have uncovered large quantities of animal fossils and lithic tools in the area.

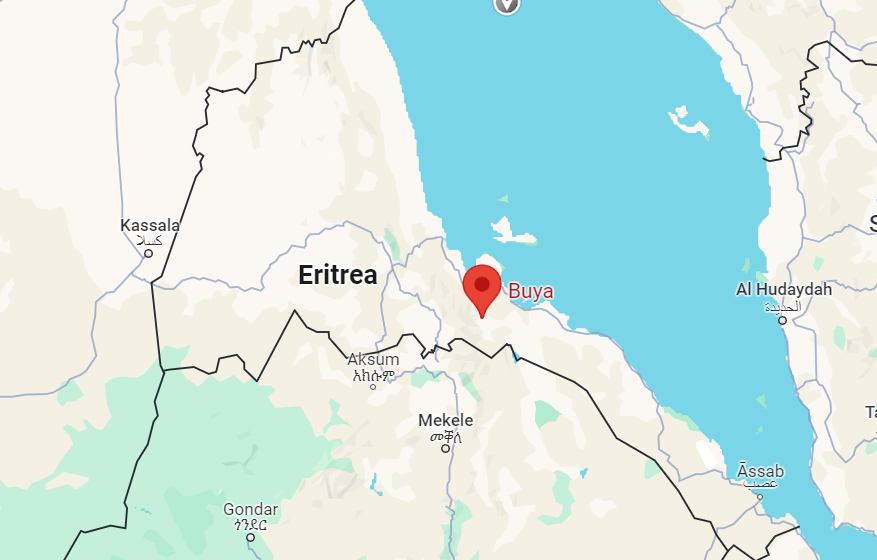
Map of Buya, Eritrea

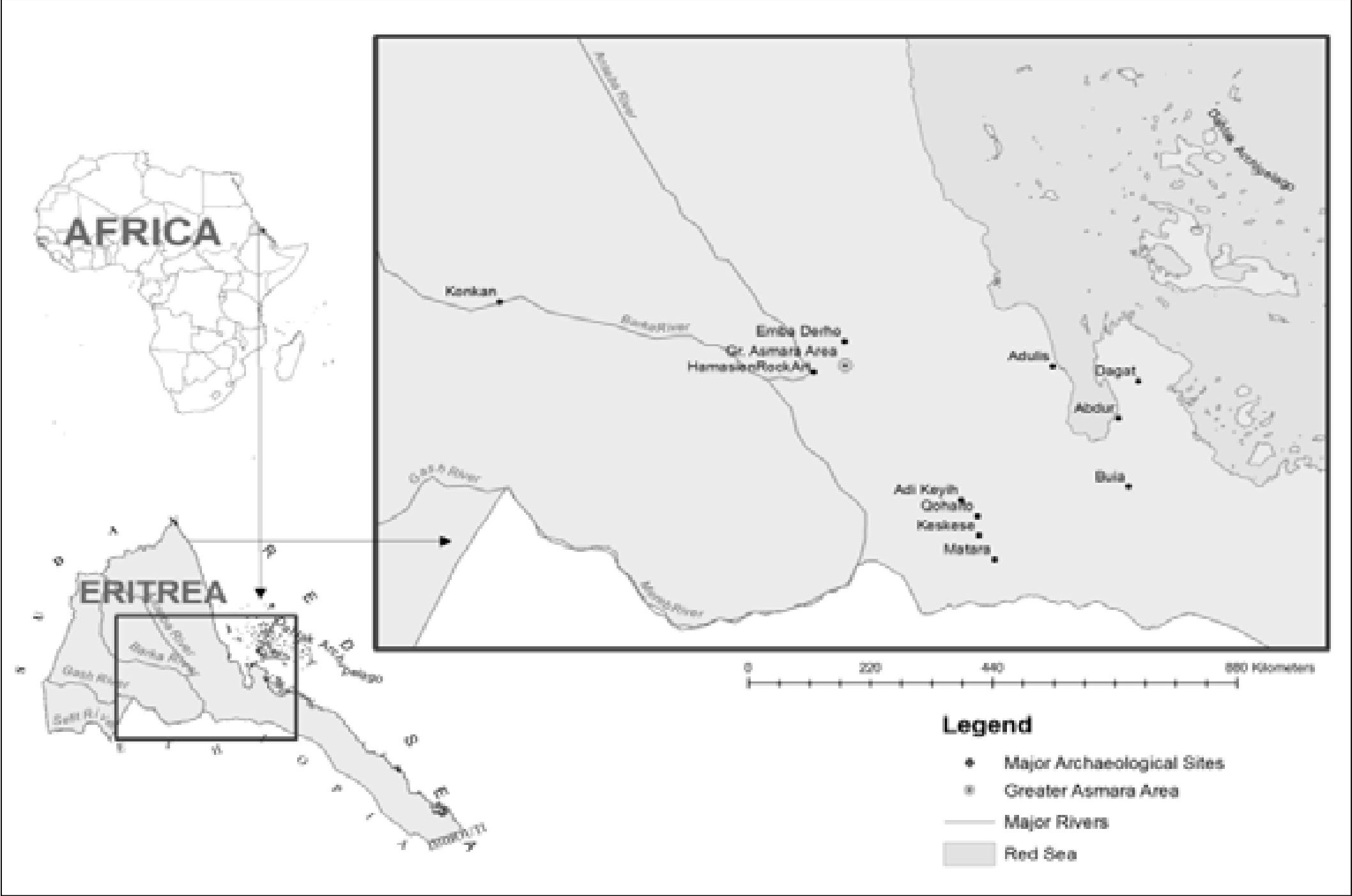
Archaeological Site In Buya, Eritrea

== Archaeology ==
Surveys and excavations of the region have led to the identification of hundreds of fossils and artifacts. Much of the artifacts found in the area are acheulean or oldowan.

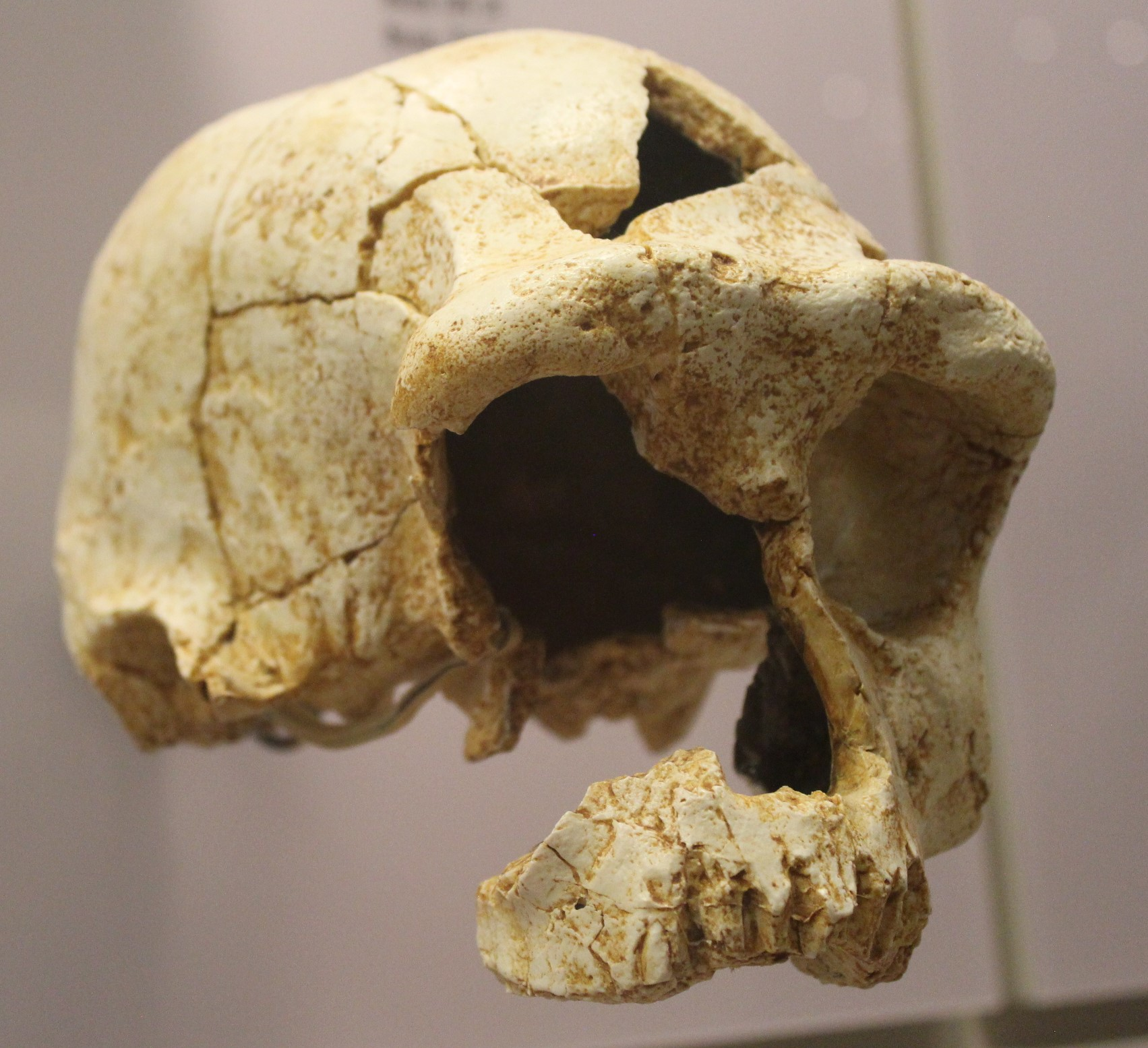
Skull of Madam Buya

Following a 1994 prospection of the region, surveys were carried out in 1995. These surveys were conducted by the Asmara Department of Mines, the Department of Earth Sciences, the Eritrean Ministry of Energy and Mines, and the University of Florence. Buya was excavated from 1995 to 1997 by a team of Eritrean and Italian paleontologists from the National Museum of Eritrea, and the University of Florence. The material they uncovered was stored in the Asmara Department of Mines. Archaeological work was temporarily halted from 1998 to 1999 by the Ethiopian-Eritrean conflict. Research began again in 2000. They established a laboratory in 2001 within the National Museum of Eritrea for the safekeeping of the fossils. One of the paleontologists, Lorenzo Rook, unearthed fragments of the Homo erectus fossil Madam Buya. The fossil was found inside of ancient lake sediments located within the Danakil Depression.

This skeleton consisted of a nearly complete cranium, two fragments of a pelvis, and two incisors. It lacks a mandible and has no remaining dental crowns. Most of the root canals were missing, although a few were preserved in the maxilla. The root canals show occlusal wear, dentine accumulation, and loss of enamel. The cranium has a long and narrow braincase, round parietooccipital area, bulging occipital lobes, a constricted postorbital area, and a volume of 995 cubic centimeters. It has a more pronounced bossing, large and deeper orbits, larger zygomatic bones with maxilla, a slightly more curved frontal profile, and a thinner endocranium than other archaic human fossils. According to research published in 2022, the maxilla of this fossil are larger than any other known Early Pliocene hominin fossil. Two fossils of permanent teeth with dental crowns and roots, as well as a hip bone fragment, were uncovered in 1995. In 2003 archaeologists uncovered a pubic symphysis fragment at the site. These fossils are all thought to belong to the same individual. Analysis of the pubic symphysis suggests that the skeleton may have belonged to an individual between the ages of 25 and 30.

The fossil bears characteristics of both Homo erectus skeletons and Homo sapiens skeletons. It has a large brow ridge, oval neurocranium, and wide cheekbones. These traits are all characteristics of a Homo erectus fossil. It also has a cranium which is widest high on the vault, which is a human trait. The fossil contains features of both Early Pleistocene human fossils and Middle Pleistocene fossils, providing archaeologists with evidence of the transition between these two periods. For these reasons, the discovery is considered an important source of information about the development of modern humans. The fossils found at the site were dated to be one million-years-old. Fission-track dating of the fossils dated them to be 0.75±0.16 million years old. Further research led to an estimated age of 1.3±0.3 million years old.

Another team of Italian, French, and Eritrean paleontologists conducted an excavation in 2011. They found another Homo erectus fossil at the site. Massimo Delfino, one of the paleontologists, found the artifact while conducting a routine survey of the area. Another excavator, Husein Omar, discovered a set of 650,000 to 1.4 million-year-old molars. According to Medin, this discovery provided a vital source of information about human development during this time period and an opportunity for further research in Eritrea. In 2012 archaeologists working for the Sapienza University of Rome made another expedition. This project was coordinated with the University of Padua, National Museum of Natural History in Paris, and the University of Turin. They found another million-year-old fossil and some lithic objects. Because of this discovery, the site was nicknamed the "Shrine of the Amygdales" for its large quantity of important archaeological sites. In addition, six traces of 800,000-year-old human footprints have been found in the region.

Archaeologists have uncovered 213 lithic objects at Buya. According to a 2004 study of the site, they found 133 flakes, 26 choppers, 13 hand-axes, 9 hammerstones, 6 cores, 2 hammers, and 1 trihedral pick. These objects were found across three areas. Area one is located along a gully in the northern part of the region. Area two is located on elevated ground in the northeastern part of the region. Area three is located along the western borders of Buya. 98 flakes, 15 choppers, 8 hammerstones, 4 cores, one hand-axe, one pitted pebble, and one trihedral pick were all found in area one. 78 of these objects contained unworn edges, with only 37 having any wear. The axes and choppers were made from pebbles. The hammerstones were made of quartz arentine. Some of the axes and the pick were made from basalt. The flakes were primarily made from quartz, although marble, basalt, and quartzite were also utilized. 98 total artifacts were recovered from area two. These materials consist of 22 flakes, 10 hand-axes, 9 choppers, and a basalt pebble used as a hammer. Most of the choppers from this area were unworn, with only having patina. The axes are also mostly unworn and are primarily made from schist and basalt. Although marble was used for one of them. The one core is made from marble, and the one hammer is made from an elongated oval-shaped basalt pebble. Only 12 artifacts were found in area three. These consist of 8 flakes, 2 transverse choppers, 1 hand-axe, and a core. The choppers were made from elongated marble pebbles, the hand-axe from a basalt flake, and the core was made from a thick basalt pebble. 6 of the flakes were made from quartz and 2 were made from basalt. There were a small number of objects identified in between these areas. These include 3 basalt flakes, 1 quartz flake, 1 quartz arenite flake, 1 cordiform axe, and a quartz arenite hammerstone.

== Paleoecology ==
Numerous remains of flora and fauna have been found at the site. These fossils have been revealed due to erosion, climate changes, and volcanic activity. The type of animals found at this site are typical for East African Early Pleistocene faunas. Remains of extinct species from this time period found at the site include the Theropithecus oswaldi, Pelorovis oldowayensis, Giraffa jumae, Hexaprotodon, Hippopotamus gorgops, Palaeoloxodon recki, Palaeoloxodon recki ileretensis, Kolpochoerus olduvaiensis, Kolpochoerus majus, Metridiochoerus modestus, and potentially the Giraffa pygmaea. One potential new species of bull, Bos buiaensis, may have been identified at the site. Bovid fossils found at Buya contain characteristics of aurochs and pelorovis. This indicates that humans may have had a relationship with cattle since the Late Pliocene.

Other remnants of extant animals such as the White rhinoceros, goat, Grévy's zebra, Sitatunga, waterbuck, Cane rat, Kori bustard, Old World monkey, Spotted hyena, and an unspecified Gazella species have been identified. Most of the mammals found at Buya are water-dependent species that inhabit grassland or savanna environments. For example, taxa found at Buya such as the hippopotamus, waterbuck, sitatunga, crocodile, African rock python, Nile monitor lizard, and pelomedusidae are all creatures that rely on water and live in grassland or savanna environments. This indicates that the region consisted of moist grassland or savanna habitats situated near water. Stratigraphic evidence also suggests the reach once was a grassland or savanna located near water. Rare examples of pre-Middle Pleistocene Nile crocodiles have been found in Buya. Very few examples of this species dating back to before the Middle Pleistocene have been identified in Africa. Examples of bird species such as anhinga or burhinus were found in the area. These imply that the region had open water with reed beds near dry areas. Fossils of clarias, a genus of fish, were also identified.

Hundreds of trace fossils were identified in Buya. These fossils can be divided into two categories. One is rosette-shaped trace fossils, the other is ring-shaped fossils. These fossils were likely made by oolitic sand filling in imprints left by the original object. It is unclear what organisms could have made it. It can be inferred that soft-bodied organisms with radial symmetry were responsible for the original imprints. They likely used a pedal disc to create the imprint. Sea anemones were considered as a potential origin of the fossils, however, sea anemone appear in the ocean, whilst these fossils occurred on land. Other species such as scyphoza have been considered, however, the patterns in the ichnofossils are unlike other known animals. It is possible that two new ichnotaxa were responsible for the imprints. Abiogenic origins have also been considered, although, the complexity of the patterns strongly suggest that they have biogenic origins.

Cutmarks in fossilized bones and flesh indicate that a Pleistocene human population may have practiced the butchering of animal carcasses. One bovid fossil bears deep cuts on the neck, near the jugular vein. These cuts were likely made by a lithic tool and intended to decapitate the animal. Another waterbuck fossil shows oblique, short, and straight scratch marks likely also made by a lithic tool, to skin the animal. Another mammalian hip pelvis fossil and a crocodile femur fossil also contain scratch marks indicating that it was skinned. V-shaped cutmarks probably made by a lithic tool were found on the femur of a hippopotamus fossil. They were likely an attempt to detach the leg from the body. Three short and arched cutmarks were identified on the fossil of a hippopotamus tibia. They appear to have been made by stone tools and to have been intended to separate the leg from the joints. Bitemarks found on other fossils and coprolites found at the site indicate the presence of carnivores.

== Geology and geography ==
The Buya basin is located in the northwestern part of the Afar Triangle. This area contains a village populated by the Saho people and the Afar people. This town has an economy sustained by irrigation, goat-herding, and trade. In 2000 a camp for people displaced by the Eritrean–Ethiopian War. The archaeological site is located within the Dandiero basin, which is the northern part of the Danakil depression. It is named after the Buya village which is located 100 kilometers south-southeast of Massawa. The excavated site was 500 meters thick and is southeast of Buya by the Alad wells and the Alid volcano. It is covered in grey and white silts and contains river areas with small numbers of marls. The area is built on a basement of Neoproterozoic rock. This rock basement is metamorphic and consists of low-grade dolomitic rock, marble, calcareous meta-sediments, amphibolite gneiss, granite gneiss, and high-grade kyanite schist that came into contact with graphitic slate.
