= Çobana =

- جوبان
- Country: Syria
- Governorate: Aleppo
- District: Afrin
- Nahiyah: Jindires
- Time zone: UTC+3

Çobana (Arabic: جوبان, Kurdish: Çobana) is a Kurdish village administratively part of the Jindires Subdistrict, Afrin District, Aleppo Governorate, in northwestern Syria. The village had a population of 143 according to the 2004 census, and 464 according to civil registry records at the end of 2005.
