= Pezzata Mòchena =

Italian breed of goat

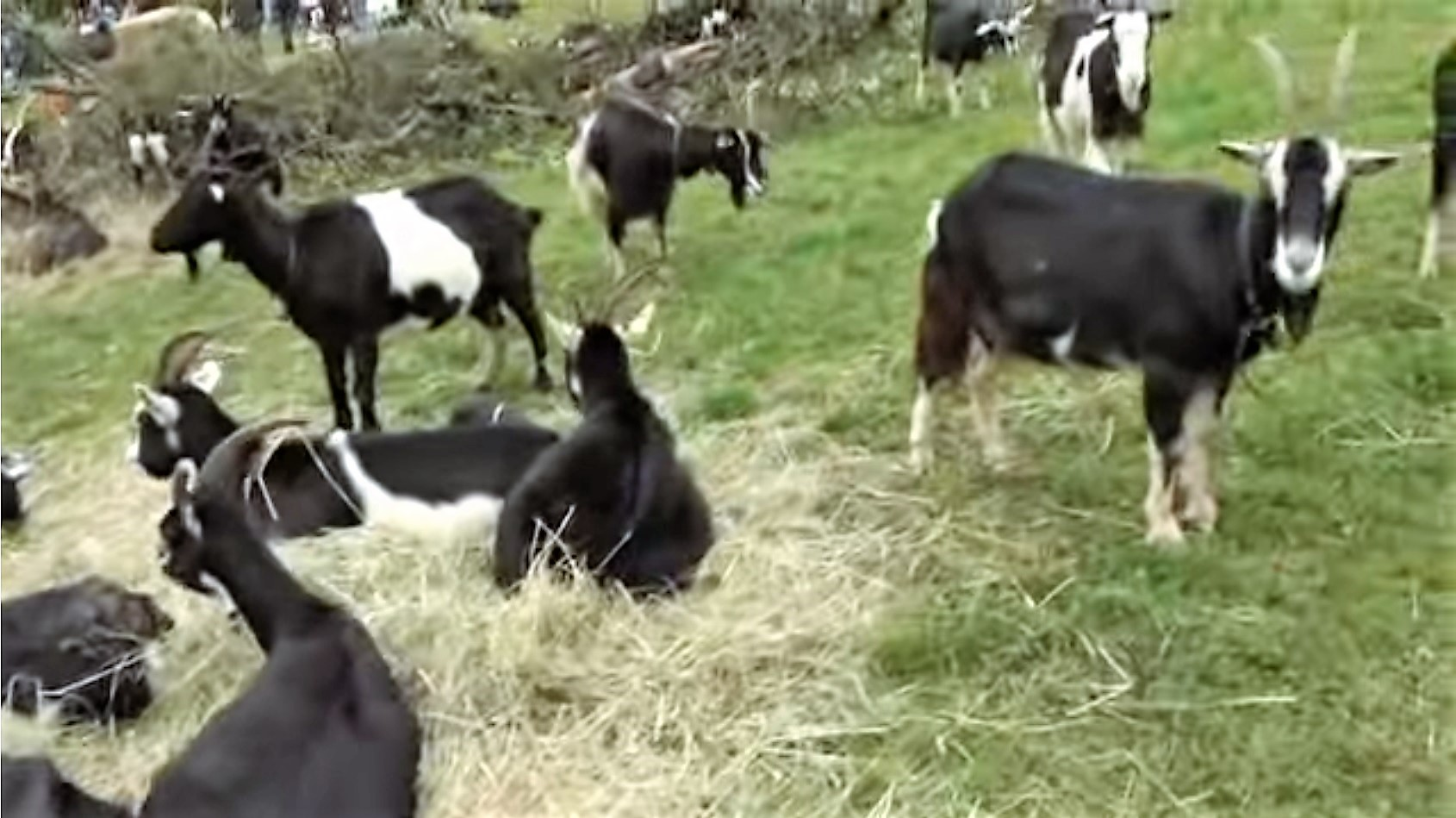
- The 7th provincial Pezzata Mochena Goat Show in Bedollo, in 2013.
- Conservation status: FAO (2007): not listed
- Other names: Capra Pezzata Mòchena; Valle dei Mocheni; Pletzet Goes van der Bersntol
- Country of origin: Italy
- Distribution: Autonomous Province of Trento
- Standard: MIPAAF
- Use: dual purpose, meat and milk

Traits
- Weight: Female: 65 kg
- Height: Male: 86 cm; Female: 76 cm
- Coat: usually pied, sometimes with Swiss markings
- Horn status: almost always horned in both sexes
- Goat; Capra aegagrus hircus

The Pezzata Mòchena, known in Mòcheno as the Pletzet Goes van der Bersntol, is an indigenous breed of domestic goat from the Autonomous Province of Trento, in north-eastern Italy. It originates from the Valle dei Mòcheni, also known as the Valle del Fersina and as the Bersntol, which since the fourteenth century has been home to a Mòcheno-speaking population of Bavarian origin; the breed may for this reason also be called the Valle dei Mòcheni.

The Pezzata Mòchena is raised in the Valle del Fersina, in the upper and lower Valsugana, and on the Altopiano di Piné. The breed was recognised in 2004, and the herdbook established in March 2005. The Pezzata Mòchena is one of the forty-three autochthonous Italian goat breeds of limited distribution for which a herdbook is kept by the Associazione Nazionale della Pastorizia, the Italian national association of sheep- and goat-breeders.

At the end of 2013 the registered population was variously reported as 261 and as 274.
