= Illegal settlements =

Illegal settlements may refer to:

- Settler colonialism, illegal under international law
  - Ba'athist Arabization campaigns in northern Iraq
  - Indonesian transmigration program
  - Israeli settlement
  - Moroccan settlements
  - Pashtun colonization of northern Afghanistan
  - Turkish settlers in Northern Cyprus
  - Western European colonialism and colonization
    - European colonization of the Americas
    - European colonization of India
- Squatting
- Illegal construction
- Illegal agreements or illegal arrangements of the following:
  - Settlement (closing), the final step in executing a real estate transaction
  - Settlement (finance), where securities are delivered against payment of money
  - Settlement (litigation), a resolution between disputing parties about a legal case
  - Settlement (trust), a deed whereby property is given by a settlor into trust
  - Structured settlement, a negotiated financial or insurance arrangement
