= Booyah (Here We Go) =

Single by Sweetbox

from the album Unreleased
- Released: 1995
- Genre: Dance; Euro house
- Length: 3:27
- Label: Maad Records; Airplay Records
- Songwriter(s): Roberto Geo Rosan
- Producer(s): Edward Louis; Geoman

Sweetbox singles chronology
"Booyah (Here We Go)" (1995)	"Shakalaka" (1995)

"Booyah (Here We Go)" is a song by German-based music project Sweetbox, with Kimberley Kearney, also known as Tempest as the frontwoman. A Euro house track, it was released as their debut single in 1995 by Maad and Airplay Records. It created initial success for Sweetbox in Germany, where it peaked at number eight, and in France, where it reached number 15. Two of its remixes can also be found on the 2006 compilation album Best of 12" Collection. The accompanying music video for the song was directed by Horst Czenskowski.

== Critical reception ==
Andrew Diprose from Smash Hits gave the song three out of five, writing, "With a title like 'Booyah (Here We Go)' you could be forgiven for expecting a Bad Boy "ragga" choon but you can stop thinking that right away! 'Here We Go' is a big ol' Euro stomper with an old skool rap."

== Track listing ==
Italy Single
No.	Title	Length
1.	"Booyah (Here We Go) (Featuring Tempest) (Geo's Club Version)"	6:58
2.	"Booyah (Here We Go) (Featuring Tempest) (Nique's Chain Saw Mix)"	5:19
3.	"Booyah (Here We Go) (Featuring Tempest) (Long Mix)"	5:30
4.	"Booyah (Here We Go) (Featuring Tempest) (Merlyn's Latino Mix)"	5:01

Germany Single
No.	Title	Length
1.	"Booyah (Here We Go) (Featuring Tempest) (Radio Edit)"	3:27
2.	"Booyah (Here We Go) (Featuring Tempest) (Merlyn's Latino Mix)"	5:01
3.	"Booyah (Here We Go) (Featuring Tempest) (Geo's Club Version)"	6:58
4.	"Booyah (Here We Go) (Featuring Tempest) (Nique's Chain Saw Mix)"	5:19
5.	"Booyah (Here We Go) (Featuring Tempest) (Long Mix)"	5:30

France Remix Single
No.	Title	Length
1.	"Booyah (Here We Go) (Featuring Tempest) (Hot Pants Club Mix)"	6:25
2.	"Booyah (Here We Go) (Featuring Tempest) (Deep Cut Mix)"	5:59
3.	"Booyah (Here We Go) (Featuring Tempest) (Deep Club Edit)"	5:28
4.	"Booyah (Here We Go) (Featuring Tempest) (Original Version)"	5:30

Germany Remix Single
No.	Title	Length
1.	"Booyah (Here We Go) (Featuring Tempest) (Hot Pants Club Mix)"	6:25
2.	"Booyah (Here We Go) (Featuring Tempest) (Deep Cut Mix)"	5:59
3.	"Booyah (Here We Go) (Featuring Tempest) (Deep Club Edit)"	5:28

Scandinavia Single
No.	Title	Length
1.	"Booyah (Here We Go) (Featuring Tempest) (Radio Edit)"	3:27
2.	"Booyah (Here We Go) (Featuring Tempest) (Merlyn's Latino Mix)"	5:01
3.	"Booyah (Here We Go) (Featuring Tempest) (Geo's Club Version)"	6:58
4.	"Booyah (Here We Go) (Featuring Tempest) (Nique's Chain Saw Mix)"	5:19
5.	"Booyah (Here We Go) (Featuring Tempest) (Long Mix)"	5:30

France Single
No.	Title	Length
1.	"Booyah (Here We Go) (Featuring Tempest) (Radio Edit)"	3:27
2.	"Booyah (Here We Go) (Featuring Tempest) (Long Mix)"	5:30
3.	"Booyah (Here We Go) (Featuring Tempest) (Geo's Club Version)"	6:58
4.	"Booyah (Here We Go) (Featuring Tempest) (Nique's Chain Saw Mix)"	5:19

== Charts ==
Chart (1995)	Peak position
Europe (European Dance Radio)	21
France (SNEP)	15
Germany (Official German Charts)	8
Italy (Musica e dischi)	15
Netherlands (Dutch Top 40 Tipparade)	12
Netherlands (Dutch Single Tip)	8
