= Buya language =

Buya may be:

- The Buya dialect of the Masaba language
- Buya language (Democratic Republic of Congo), a Bantu language of that is closely related to Nyanga
- Laarim language, a Nilo-Saharan language of South Sudan that is also called Buya
