= Goat farming =

Raising and breeding of domestic goats

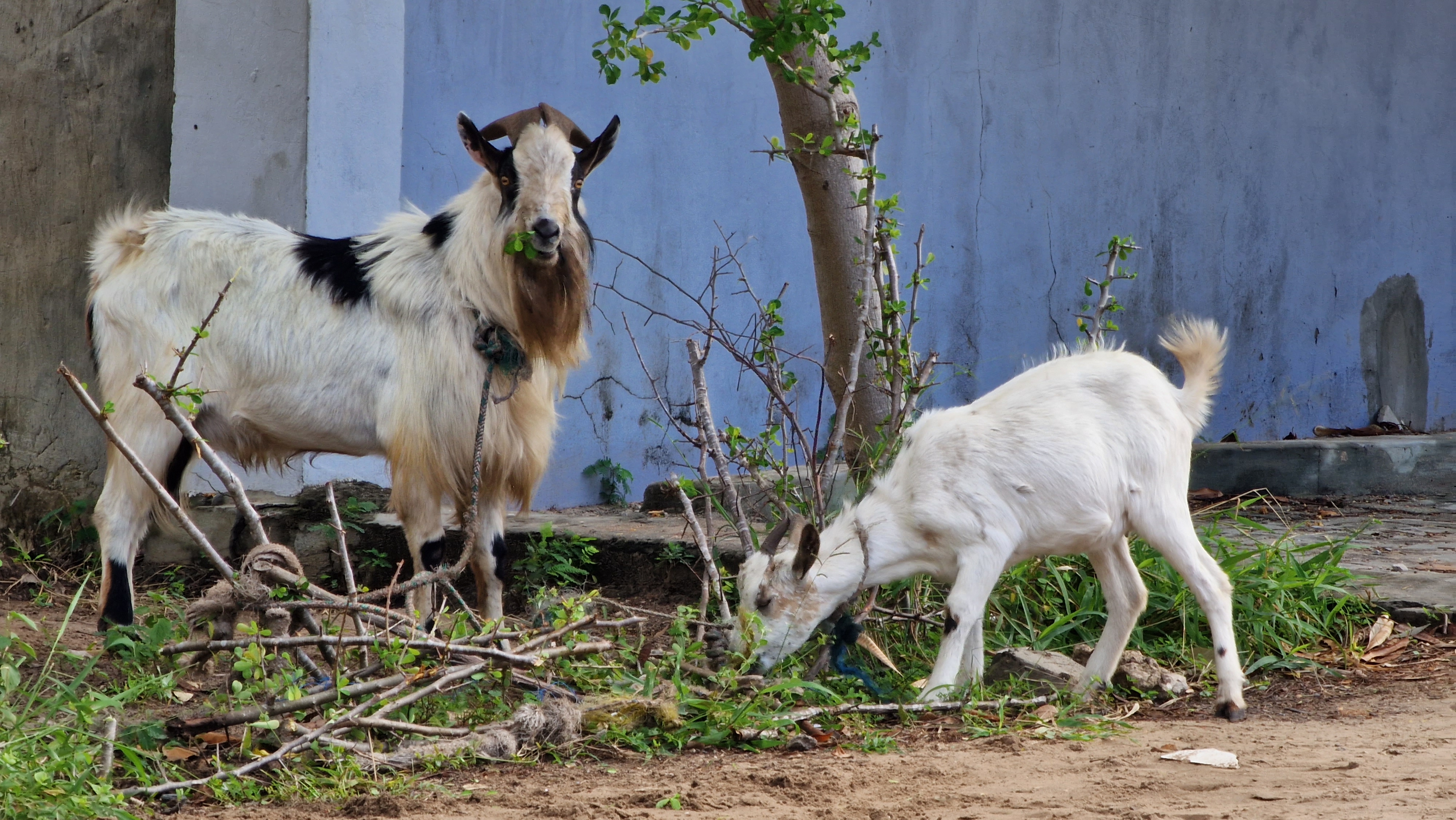
Domesticated goats in Africa

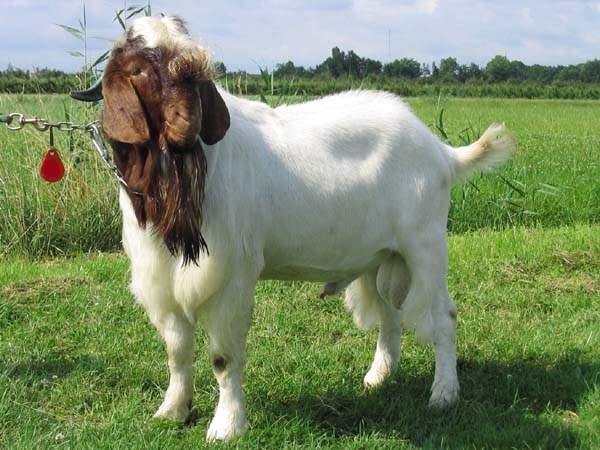
The Boer goat, a widely-farmed meat-breed

Goat farming involves the raising and breeding of domestic goats (Capra aegagrus hircus) as a branch of animal husbandry. People farm goats principally for their meat, milk, fiber and skins.

Goat farming can be very suited to production alongside other livestock (such as sheep and cattle) on low-quality grazing land. Goats efficiently convert sub-quality grazing matter that is less desirable for other livestock into quality lean meat. Furthermore, goats can be farmed with a relatively small area of pasture and with limited resources.

== Pasture ==
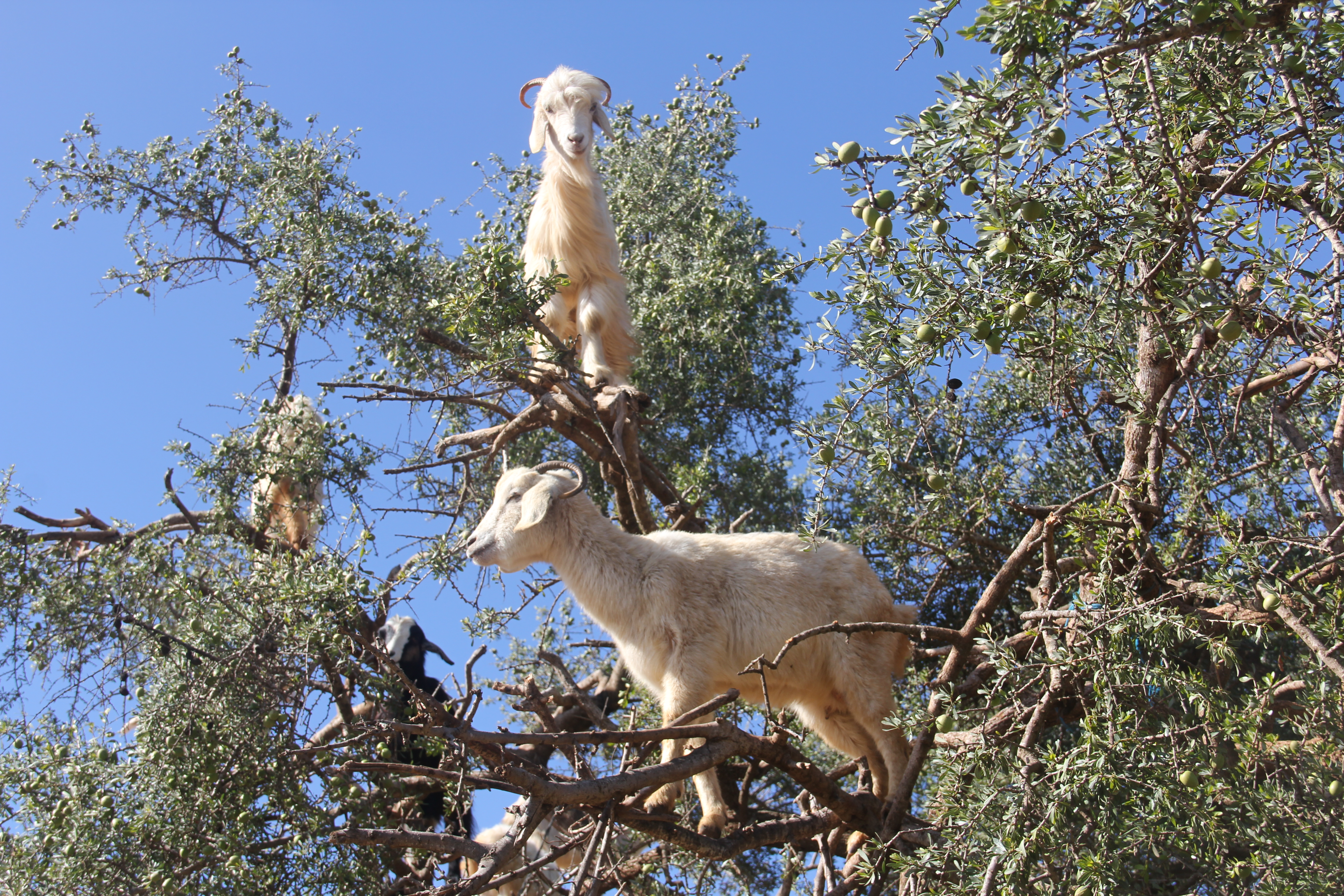
Goats are remarkably agile and will climb trees to browse.

As with other herbivores, the number of animals that a goat farmer can raise and sustain is dependent on the quality of the pasture. However, since goats will eat vegetation that most other domesticated livestock decline, they will subsist even on very poor land. Therefore, goat herds remain an important asset in regions with sparse and low quality vegetation. However, goats also show preference to certain browse and grasses, such as Multiflora Rose, Briar, Ironweed, Ragweed, Spiny Amaranth, and Pigweed among others. They are less fond of grasses such as Tall Fescue, Bermuda Grass, Orchard Grass, and Crab Grass.

== Worldwide goat population statistics ==
As of 2022, India is the largest producer of goat's milk. In 2024, the United States of America was the largest importer of goat's milk, and in the same year, New Zealand was the top exporter.

World goat production: Selected regions and countries, 2008
Country/Region	Total animals (millions)	Goat milk (MT)	Goat meat (million MT)
World	-----	15.2	4.8
Africa	294.5	3.2	1.1
Nigeria	53.8	N/A	0.26
Sudan	43.1	1.47	0.19
Asia	511.3	8.89	3.4
Afghanistan	6.38	0.11	0.04
Pakistan	60.00	N/A	N/A
Iran	16.00	N/A	N/A
India	125.7	4.0	0.48
Bangladesh	56.4	2.16	0.21
China	149.37	0.26	1.83
Saudi Arabia	2.2	0.076	0.024
Americas	37.3	0.54	0.15
Mexico	8.8	0.16	0.04
USA	3.1	N/A	0.022
Europe	17.86	2.59	0.012
UK	0.09	N/A	N/A
France	1.2	0.58	0.007
Oceania	3.42	0.0004	0.018

=== In the US ===
Meat goats are farmed in all US states, although most meat goat production occurs in the Southeast. As of 2016, Texas is the primary producer of meat goats, representing 38% of US production.

Male goats are generally not required for the dairy-goat industry and are usually slaughtered for meat soon after birth. In the UK, approximately 30,000 billy goats from the dairy industry are slaughtered each year.

=== In Africa ===
In Tanzania and Kenya, the Maasai rely on goat and cow milk, but increased droughts limited resources for cattle, so goats are increasing.

== Goat Milk Production ==
In 2017, 18.7 million tonnes of goats milk was produced globally, a 16% increase since 2007.

== Gallery ==
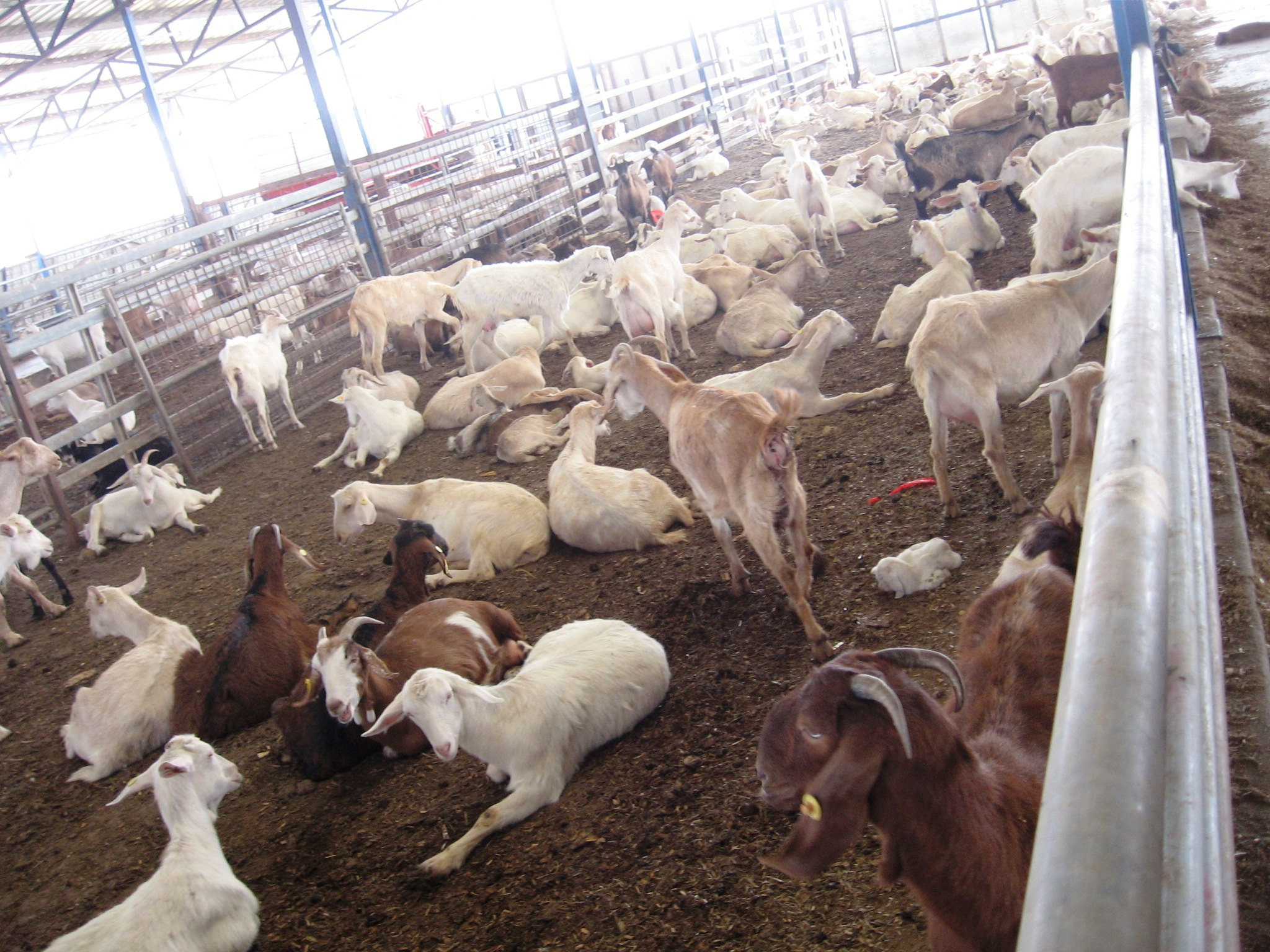
Goat farm

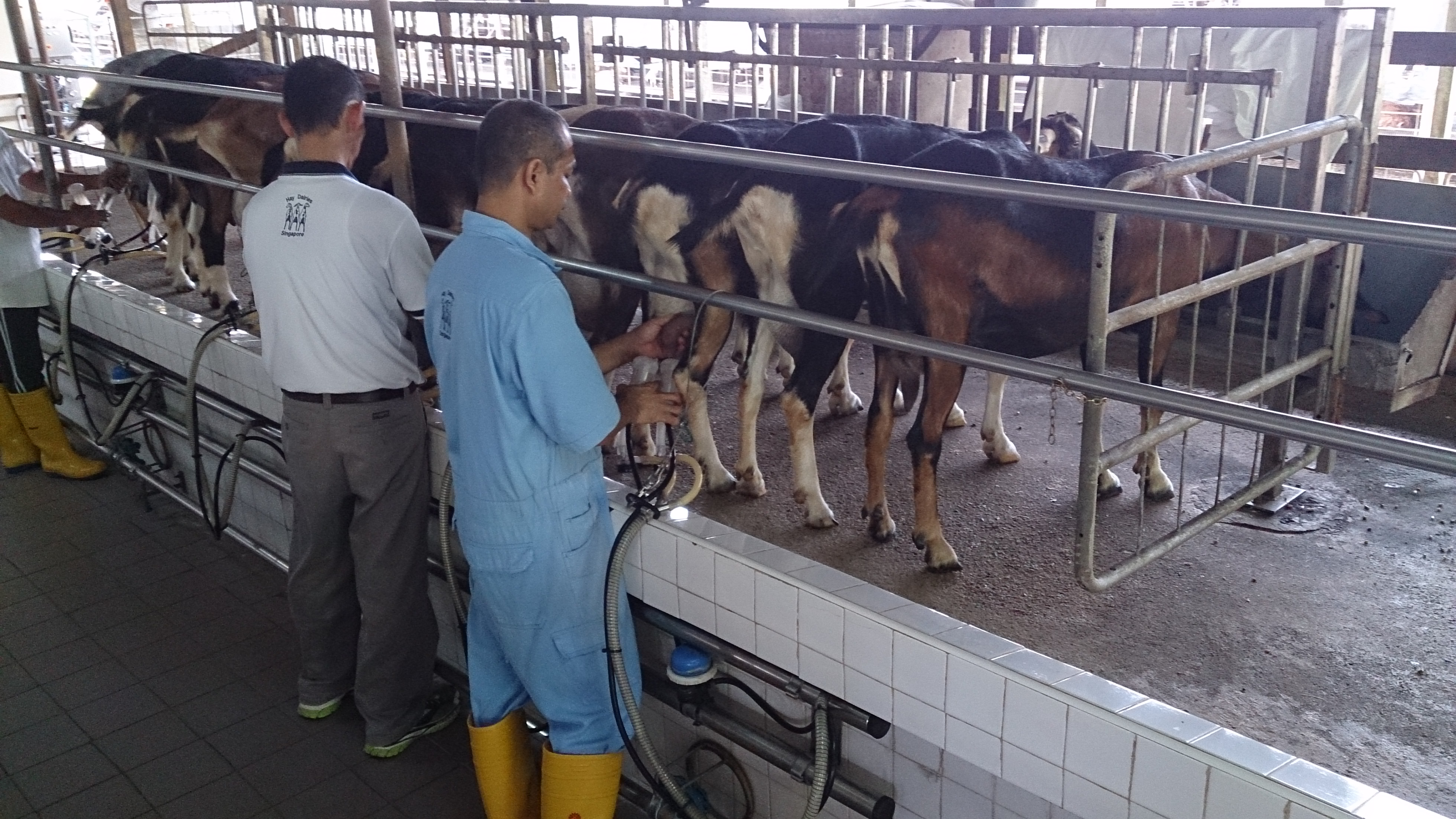
Goat milking

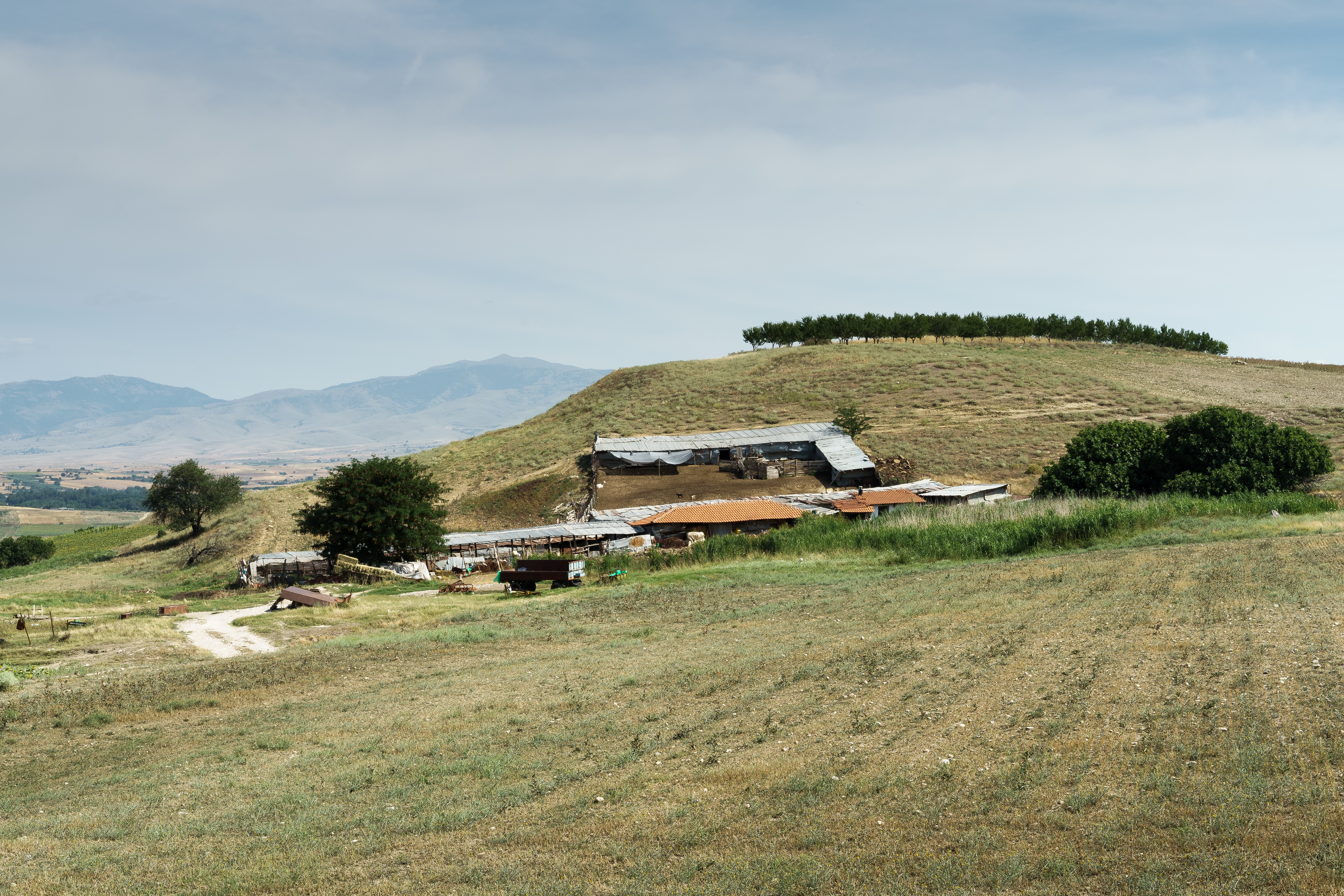
Pen for goats

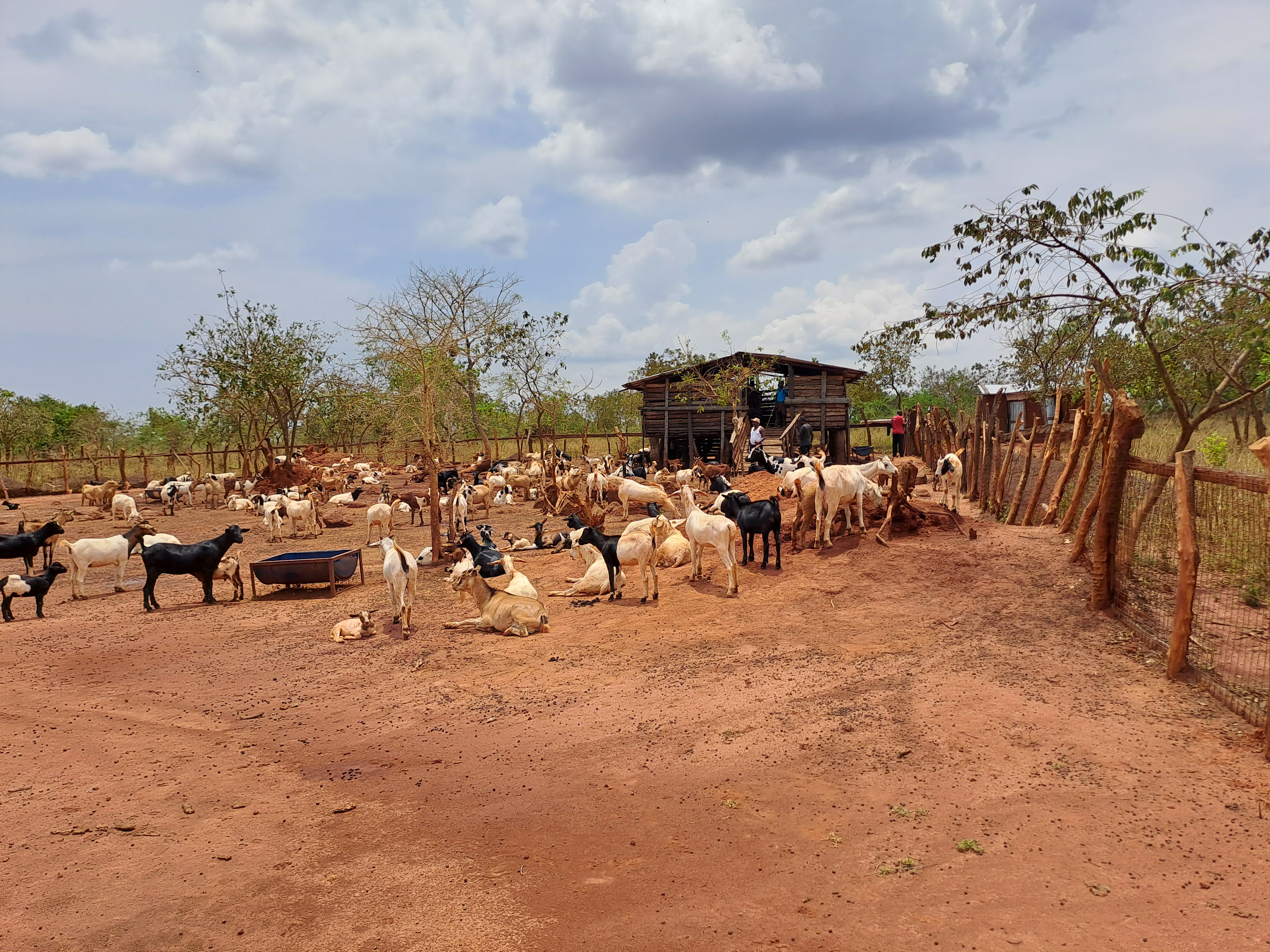
Goat farming in Uganda

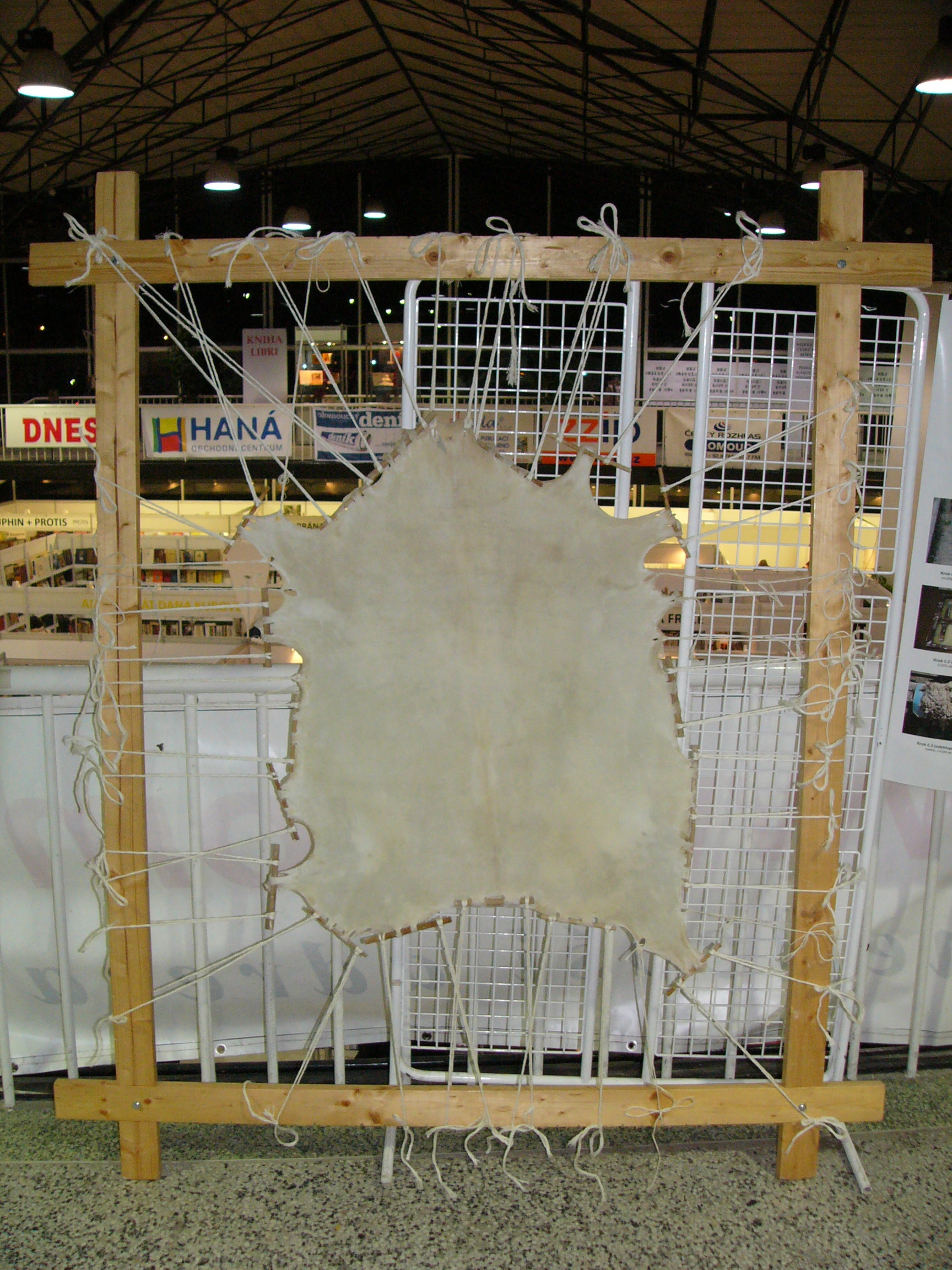
Goatskin parchment on wooden frame

== See also ==
- List of goat breeds
- Goats as pets
- List of goat dishes
