= Jindires =

Jindires جنديرس
- Town
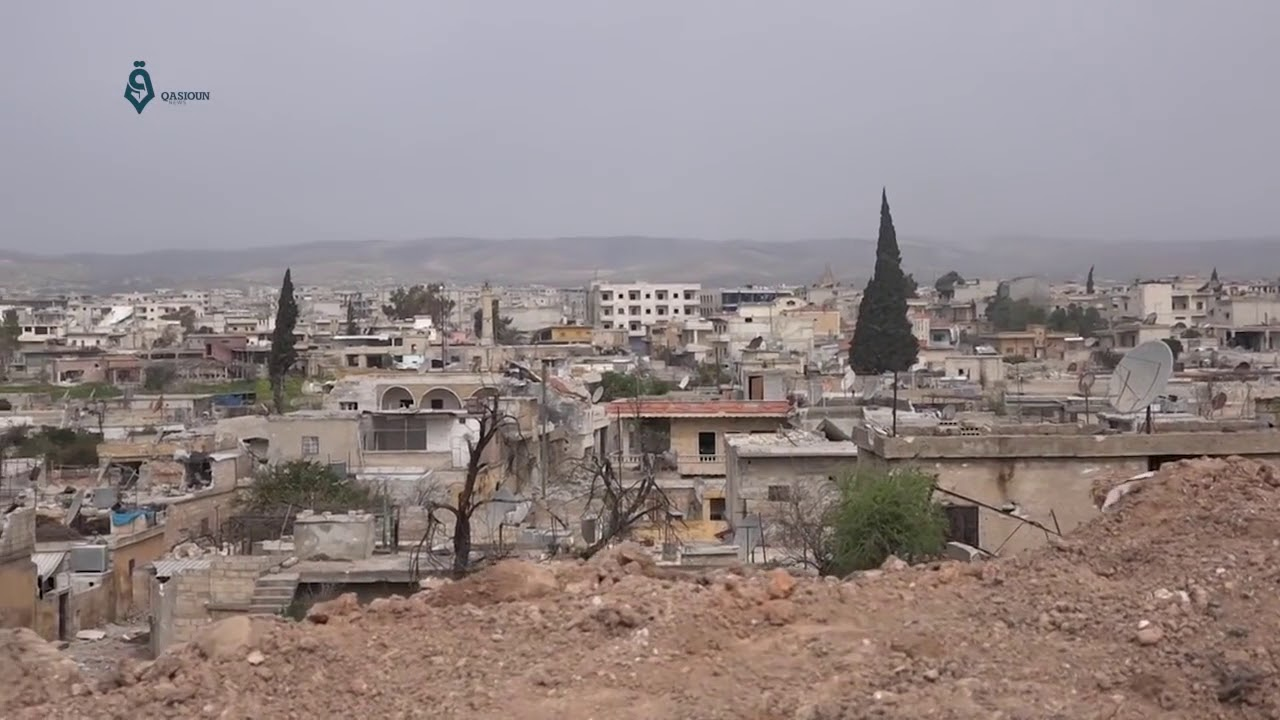
- Jindires after its capture by the Syrian National Army in March 2018.
- Interactive map of Jindires
- Location within Syria
- Coordinates: 36°23′41″N 36°41′20″E
- Country: Syria
- Governorate: Aleppo
- District: Afrin
- Subdistrict: Jindires

Population (2004 census)
  - Total: 13,661
- Time zone: UTC+3 (AST)

Jindires (Arabic: جنديرس; Kurdish: Cindirês or Cindirêsê) (Note: also spelled Jinderis, Jandairis, Jandires, Jendires, Jendeires, or Jandarus) is a town in northern Syria in the Afrin District of the Aleppo Governorate. It is located on the Afrin River, 68.4 kilometres (42.5 mi) northwest by road from Aleppo and 20.9 kilometres (13.0 mi) southwest of Afrin. Nearby localities include Deir Ballut and Bayadah to the southwest, Zahra to the northwest, Kafr Safra and Yalanqozê to the north, Afrin to the northeast and Burj Abdullah to the east. According to the Syria Central Bureau of Statistics (CBS), Jindires had a population of 13,661 in the 2004 census. It was captured by the Turkish Military and its proxy, the "Syrian National Army" in March 2018. Hayat Tahrir al-Sham temporarily took control of the town in October 2022 and March 2023.

Jindires is the administrative center of Nahiya Jindires of the Afrin District.

== Name ==
Jindiris is the site of the ancient town of Gindarus or Gindaros (Ancient Greek: Γίνδαρος) also called Gindara (Ancient Greek: Γίνδαρα). The Middle Persian and Parthian transliterations, attested in Shapur I's inscription at the Ka'ba-ye Zartosht, are Gndlswy and Gndrws respectively.

== History ==
The ancient town was originally an acropolis of Cyrrhestica during the Hellenistic period. The Battle of Mount Gindarus took place near the town in 38 BC. The Parthians under Pacorus I suffered a massive defeat to the Roman armies of Ventidius and Pacorus himself was killed in battle. Under the Romans the city belonged to Antioch. In 252/3, during the second Roman campaign of Sasanian King Shapur I (r. 240–270), the city was captured by the Persians. Emperor Theodosius I fortified the city during his reign (379–395). Traces of the fortified wall still remain on the south and west side of the tell, while the modern village is located at the base. It was captured by the Arabs in 637 during the Muslim conquest of the Levant.

In the 14th century, during Mamluk rule, Jindires was visited by Syrian geographer al-Dimashqi who described it as "a town near Tizin, and in the territory of Jumah. It is a place full of habitations. There are thermal springs here, but it is unknown where the waters rise, or whither they flow."

The 19th-century British writer, William Harrison Ainsworth, visited the village and described it in his magazine as "containing about fifty cottages, and characterized by its artificial mound, or tel, upon which but few traces are now to be met of the castle or citadel (Acropolis in Greek; Arx in Latin) of Cyrrhestica, and described by Strabo as 'a fit receptacle for thieves.'"

=== Ecclesiastical history ===
The first and only known bishop of Gindarus was Peter, who attended the Council of Nicaea in 325 and that of Antioch in 341. At the time of Justinian, Gindarus had only a periodeutes and not a bishop. The relics of St. Marinus were kept here but were later transferred to Antioch. The bishopric is included in the Catholic Church's list of titular sees.

=== Modern era ===
In the summer of 2012, during the Syrian uprising, Jindires was taken over by the People's Protection Units (YPG).

On 8 March 2018, Jindires was captured by the Turkish Armed Forces and their allies the Syrian National Army from the YPG, during Operation Olive Branch. Hayat Tahrir al-Sham (HTS) entered and took partial control of the town on 12 October 2022. The town was heavily damaged in the earthquake of 6 February 2023, with hundreds of residents killed or injured.

The SNA group Ahrar al-Sharqiya shot and killed four Kurdish civilians during Newroz celebrations in the town on 20 March 2023. HTS then expelled Jaysh al-Sharqiya and took full control the next day.

== Demographics ==
In late 19th century, German orientalist Martin Hartmann noted Jindires as a settlement with 20 houses inhabited by Kurmanji-speaking Kurds.

== Sources ==
- Cohen, Getzel M. (2006). The Hellenistic Settlements in Syria, the Red Sea Basin, and North Africa. University of California Press Press. ISBN 9780520241480.
- Kettenhofen, Erich (2001). "GINDAROS". In Yarshater, Ehsan (ed.). Encyclopædia Iranica. Vol. X/6: Germany VI–Gindaros. London and New York: Routledge & Kegan Paul. p. 672. ISBN 978-0-933273-55-9.
- Kreitzer, Larry Josep (1996). Striking New Images: Roman Imperial Coinage and the New Testament World. Continuum International Publishing Group. ISBN 9781850756231.
- le Strange, Guy (1890). Palestine Under the Moslems: A Description of Syria and the Holy Land from A.D. 650 to 1500. Committee of the Palestine Exploration Fund.
- Sagona, A. G. (1984). The Caucasian region in the early Bronze Age. Vol. 2. B.A.R. ISBN 9780860542773.
- Ainsworth, William Harrison (1844). Ainsworth's magazine. Vol. 6. Chapman and Hall.
- This article incorporates text from a publication now in the public domain: Vailhé, S. (1909). "Gindarus". In Herbermann, Charles (ed.). Catholic Encyclopedia. Vol. 6. New York: Robert Appleton Company.
