= Jindires Subdistrict =

Jindires Subdistrict ناحية جنديرس Nahiye Cindirêsê
- Subdistrict
- Location of Jindires Subdistrict within Aleppo Governorate

- Location in Syria
- Coordinates: 36.41427°N 36.69712°E
- Country: Syria
- Governorate: Aleppo
- District: Afrin

Population (2004)
  - Total: 32,947
- Geocode: SY020302

Jindires Subdistrict (Arabic: ناحية جنديرس, Kurdish: Nahiye Cindirêsê) is a subdistrict of Afrin District, Aleppo Governorate, in northwestern Syria. Its administrative centre is the town of Jindires. The subdistrict had a population of 32,947 according to the 2004 census.

== Populated places ==
PCode	Name	Population
	Jindires	13661
	Çobana	143
