= Kurds in Syria =

Ethnic group

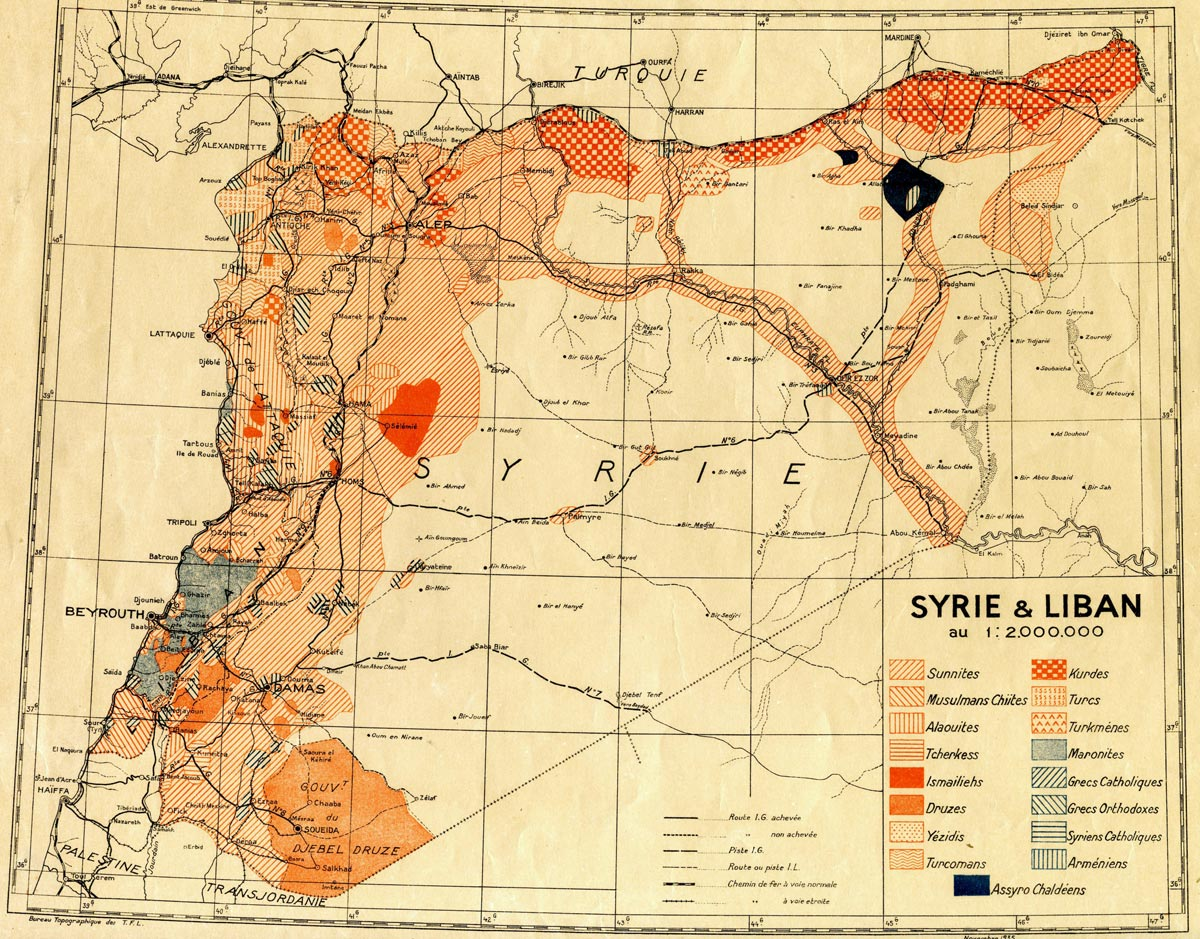
- A map of religious and ethnic communities of Syria and Lebanon (1935).

Total population
- Estimates from 1.6 million to 2.5 million Kurds make up between 5% and 10% of Syria's population.

Regions with significant populations
- Northeastern Syria, Afrin, Kobani

Languages
- Mainly Kurdish (Kurmanji); also Arabic (North Levantine Arabic, Modern Standard Arabic)

Religion
- Majority Sunni Islam; Minority Yazidism, and Shia Islam

The Kurdish population of Syria is the country's largest ethnic minority, usually estimated at 10% of the Syrian population and 9% of the Kurdish population.

The majority of Syrian Kurds are originally Turkish Kurds who have crossed the border during different events in the 20th century. There are three major centers for the Kurdish population in Syrian, the northern part of the Jazira, the central Euphrates Region around Kobanî and in the west the area around Afrin. All of these are on the Syria-Turkey border, and there are also substantial Kurdish communities in Aleppo and Damascus further south.

During Ba'athist rule, human rights organizations accused the Syrian government of routinely discriminating and harassing Syrian Kurds. Many Kurds seek political autonomy for what they regard as Western Kurdistan, similar to the Kurdistan Regional Government in Iraq, or to be part of an independent state of Kurdistan. In the context of the Syrian Civil War, Kurds established the Autonomous Administration of North and East Syria.

== Demographics ==
Syrian Kurds live mainly in three Kurdish pockets in northern Syria adjacent to Turkey. Many Kurds also live in the large cities and metropolitan areas of the country, for example, in the neighborhood Rukn al-Din in Damascus, which was formerly known as Hayy al Akrad (Kurdish Quarter), and the Aleppo neighborhoods of al Ashrafiya and Sheikh Maqsood.

Kurds are the largest ethnic minority in Syria, and make up between 5 and 10 percent of the Syrian population. The estimates are diluted due to the effects of the Syrian civil war and the permeability of the Syrian-Turkish border. The Kurdish population in Syria is relatively small in comparison to the Kurdish populations in nearby countries, such as Turkey, Iran, and Iraq. The majority of Syrian Kurds speak Kurmanji, a Kurdish dialect spoken in Turkey and northeastern Iraq and Iran.

It is estimated that at the beginning of the 20th century around 12,000 Kurds lived in Damascus; an unknown number of Kurds lived in the Kurd-Dagh region; 16,000 Kurds lived in the Jarabulus region; and an unknown number lived in the Jazira province, where they were likely the majority. The extension of the railway and road to Nusaybin in 1918 intensified the immigration of Kurds southwards into the Syrian foothills and plains along rivers. In the 1920s after the failed Kurdish rebellions in Kemalist Turkey, there was a large migration of Kurds to Syria's Jazira province. It is estimated that 25,000 Kurds fled at this time to Syria. The French official reports show the existence of 45 Kurdish villages in Jazira prior to 1927. A new wave of refugees arrived in 1929. The French authorities continued to allow Kurdish migration into the Mandate, and by 1939, the villages numbered between 700 and 800. The French geographers Fevret and Gibert estimated that in 1953 out of the total 146,000 inhabitants of Jazira, agriculturalist Kurds made up 60,000 (41%), nomad Arabs 50,000 (34%), and a quarter of the population were Christians.

Even though some Kurdish communities have a long history in Syria, most Syrian Kurds originate from Turkey and have immigrated during the 20th century to escape the harsh repression of the Kurds in that country. Kurds were later joined in Syria by a new large group that drifted out of Turkey throughout the interwar period during which the Turkish campaign to assimilate its Kurdish population was at it highest. The government has used the fact that some Kurds fled to Syria during the 1920s to claim that Kurds are not indigenous to the country and to justify its discriminatory policies against them.

== History ==
=== Late antiquity ===
In the year 568, a place called "Tella de-Qurdaye" was recorded near Damascus in Syriac sources, which was probably a military settlement and denoted the "Kurdish hill" according to Theodor Nöldeke. The Syriac scholar and Archbishop of Damascus Iqlīmyus Yūsuf Dāwūd stated that Kurds were present in Damascus before the seventh century.

Contact between Kurds and the Ghassanids goes back at least to Ghassanid raids into Sasanian territory during the reign of Shapur II (309–379 CE). Ferdowsi’s Shahnameh describes the Ghassanid commander Ṭāʾir leading a coalition of Romans, Cadusians, Baḥrainis, Kurds, and Persians against the Sasanian capital Ctesiphon. These early encounters in the Jazīra probably fed later Arab legends about Kurdish origins. Both Al-Masudi and al-Bakri recorded traditions claiming the Kurds had once been Arabs who fell out with the Ghassanids, retreated into the mountains and gradually lost their Arabic. Al-Bakrī, citing al-Jayhānī, placed the original Kurdish homeland between the land of Judea in the Levant and the Arabian Peninsula, while Ibn Gharsiya noted that the Christian Arab tribe of Banū Salīḥ in southern Syria had intermarried with Kurds and Nabataeans. The Kurds attested in southern Syria most likely arrived either as nomadic groups from Upper Jazīra, helped by good relations with Arab tribes, or as soldiers serving in Roman or Sasanian armies.

=== Middle Ages ===
Al-Masudi noted in The Meadows of Gold that Kurdish tribes, including al-Danabila, had settled in the Levant, and later records mention Kurdish princes governing parts of the region, among them Mir Muhammad (d. 997). Al-Muzhiri in al-Mafatih and al-Tibi both asserting that the Kurds of the Levant descended from the Prophet Isaac, a claim raised in the course of interpreting a hadith concerning the conquest of Constantinople.

A separate account preserved by Ihsan Abbas describes a military engagement near Apamea between Kurds under Abu al-Hajjar al-Mu’ammal ibn Musbih and the Hamdanid governor of Homs, suggesting an established Kurdish presence deep within Syrian territory well before the Ayyubid period. Al Wahrani referred to the Kurds in his literary Manamāt, placing the judge Ibn Darbas al-Kurdi alongside the Umayyad caliph Yazid ibn Muawiya in a single fictional vision, a deliberate anachronism in service of his polemical purposes, though the work remains a useful mirror of the social landscape of the Levant in his era.

Kurdish ties to Aleppo consolidated during the Hamdanid period through intermarriage on both sides. A Hamdanid emir married Fatima bint Ahmad Hazarmardi, while the Marwanid ruler of Diyarbakir Said ibn Marwan wed the granddaughter of Sayf al-Dawla. These unions opened Aleppo to a growing Kurdish presence, and Kurdish relatives of the Hamdanids were a familiar sight at court. That presence is perhaps best illustrated by an exchange at Sayf al-Dawla’s majlis, where a discussion arose comparing the standing of Arabs and Kurds, prompting the prince to ask his poet al-Mutanabbi for his view, a question whose very framing speaks to how visible and consequential the Kurdish element had become in Hamdanid political life.

The Mirdasids had established Hisn al-Akrad (Krak des Chevaliers), a fortress situated roughly forty kilometers west of Homs, and came to rely on Kurds from 1031 onward to protect the roads connecting Homs and Hama to the coastal ports of Tartus and Tripoli, after whom the fortress took its name, meaning "Fortress of the Kurds".

Under the Burids in Damascus, Kurdish figures assumed more prominent roles in military and civic life. The Kurdish emir Buzan ibn Mamin led Kurdish troops and founded two mosques in Damascus, one near Bab al-Khawwassin and another outside Bab al-Faradis, along with the Mujahidiyah Madrasa. Hama was governed by a Kurdish figure known as Ali Kurd. Ibn al-Qalanisi records that in 1134, Emir Shams al-Muluk enlisted a Kurdish man from the Homs region named Badran al-Kafir to oversee the confiscation of funds from state officials.

==== Zengid and Ayyubid periods ====
As early as 1127, when Imad al-Din Zengi became atabeg of Mosul, Kurdish tribes were drawn into a massive recruitment process as the Zengids consolidated control over the Kurdish-dominated mountains north of Mosul, with their fortresses seized and their warriors integrated into Zengid armies. This policy deepened under Nur al-Din, who systematically relied on Kurdish military expertise to confront the Crusaders, resulting in a steady flow of Kurdish fighters into the cities and garrisons of the Levant, including the Kurdish Ayyubid family, as Najm al-Din Ayyub served as governor of Baalbek and later Damascus, while his brother Shirkuh served as a military commander and led Zengid armies into Egypt in 1169.

This presence deepened further under the Ayyubid dynasty (1171–1341), with Damascus serving as its Syrian administrative centre. The Kurdish tribes and regiments that accompanied Saladin, among them the Ḥumaydiyya, Mihrāniyya, Hakkāriyya, and Zarzāriyya, established distinct settlements in and around Damascus, which evolved into neighborhoods including Hayy al-Akrad (the Kurdish quarter) and al-Salihiyah on the northeastern slopes of Mount Qasioun. In Aleppo, Ibn Shaddad recorded in Al-a’laq al-khatira four Kurdish mosques clustered in a single district near al-Ḥāḍir al-Sulaymānī, among them the Mihrani mosque, the Zarzari mosque, the mosque of the Bashnawiyya, and a mosque in Harat al-Akrad. Ibn Tulun listed the village of Tell Kurdi among the settlements of Ghuta.

==== Emirate of Kilis ====
The Sharafnama describes the Kurdish Emirate of Kilis that encompassed Afrin, Harem, Azaz, Kilis, and the northern reaches of Kurd Mountain. Its founder Mand built his authority under Ayyubid patronage, receiving the fortress of al-Qusayr west of Aleppo as a fief, around which the local Kurds gradually coalesced under his rule. He went on to unite the dispersed Kurdish communities between Hama and Maraş, bringing even the Kurdish Yazidi sheikhs of the region to heel after initial resistance. The mountainous district of Mount Simeon still retains Yazidi villages to this day.

The Mamluks proved hostile after the fall of the Ayyubids, assassinating the ruling emir Habib Bek by luring him to Aleppo, and later engineering the downfall of Qasim Bek by delegating Kurdish authority to his rival Sheikh Izz al-Din al-Kurdi. When the Ottoman Sultan Selim I conquered the region, Qasim Bek declared his loyalty, but Izz al-Din accused him of treachery before the governor of Aleppo, leading to his execution and the transfer of the emirate to Izz al-Din.

==== Mamluk period ====
Ottoman tax registers record a mosque known as the "Mosque of the Kurds" in Jableh, endowed with agricultural revenues, pointing to the existence of a Kurdish landowning class in the region since the Circassian Mamluk period. The plateau surrounding Jableh and Latakia continued to be known as Jabal al-Akrad, and several villages in the area still bear names that reflect this heritage, among them Duwayr al-Akrad, Mazraat al-Akrad, and Bayt al-Kurdi.

Under the Mamluks, the Qaymariyya Kurdish emirs, who had played a decisive role in delivering Damascus to An-Nasir Yusuf in 1250 by opening the city’s gates to his army, continued to wield military influence in Syria during the early Mamluk period, as documented by the historian al-Khazraji. Kurds also occupied prominent judicial positions across Syria and Egypt throughout this period.

The Armenian historian Hayton of Corycus, dictating his Flos Historiarum Terre Orientis in 1307, recounts that following his defeat by the Mamluks in 1277, the Ilkhan Abaqa launched a retaliatory raid in which he seized two thousand Saracen cavalry along with five thousand Kurdish families who had been settled in northern Syria.

=== Ottoman period ===
The Kurdish community's role in the military continued under the Ottomans. Kurdish soldiers and policeman from the city were tasked with both maintaining order and protecting the pilgrims’ route toward Mecca. Many Kurds from Syria's rural hinterland joined the local Janissary corps in Damascus. Later, Kurdish migrants from diverse areas, such as Diyarbakir, Mosul and Kirkuk, also joined these military units which caused an expansion of the Kurdish community in the city.

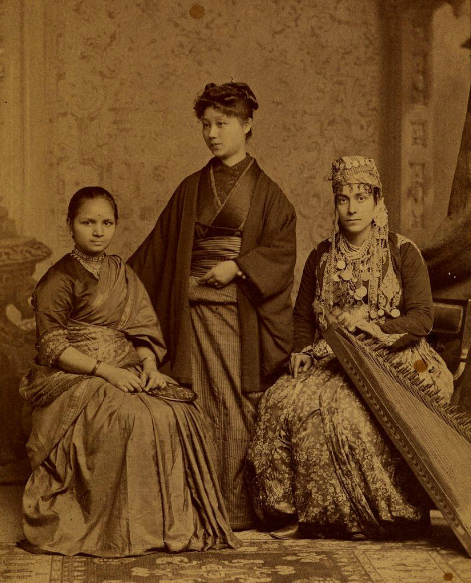
The first licensed female doctors in India, Syria and Japan. Anandibai Joshee (Indian), Kei Okami (Japanese), Sabat Islambooly (Kurdish Jew from Syria) – 10 October 1885

The Kurdish dynasty of Janbulads ruled the region of Aleppo as governors for the Ottomans from 1591 to 1607. At the beginning of the 17th century, Kurdish tribes were forcefully settled in the vicinity of Jarabulus and Seruj by the Ottoman sultans. In the mid-18th century, Ottomans recognized Milli tribal leaders as iskan başı or chief of sedentarization in Raqqa area. They were given taxing authority and controlling other tribes in the region. In 1758, Milli chief and iskan başı Mahmud bin Kalash entered Khabur valley, subjugated the local tribes and brought the area under control of Milli confederation and attempted to set up an independent principality. In 1800, the Ottoman government appointed the Milli chief Timur as governor of Raqqa (1800–1803).

The Danish writer Carsten Niebuhr, who traveled to Jazira in 1764, recorded five nomadic Kurdish tribes (Dukurie, Kikie, Schechchanie, Mullie and Aschetie) and six Arab tribes (Tay, Kaab, Baggara, Geheish, Diabat and Sherabeh). According to Niebuhr, the Kurdish tribes were settled near Mardin in Turkey, and paid the governor of that city for the right of grazing their herds in the Syrian Jazira. These Kurdish tribes gradually settled in villages and cities and are still present in Jazira (modern Syria's Hasakah Governorate).

In the mid-1800s, the Emirate of Bohtan of Bedir Khan Beg span over parts of present-day northeastern Syria. The demographics of this area underwent a huge shift in the early part of the 20th century. Ottoman authorities with the cooperation of Kurdish troops (and to a lesser degree, Circassian and Chechen tribes) persecuted Armenian and Assyrian Christians in Upper Mesopotamia and were granted their victims' land as a reward. Kurds were responsible for most of the atrocities against Assyrians, and Kurdish expansion happened at the expense of Assyrians (due to factors like proximity). Kurdish as well as Circassian and Chechen tribes cooperated with the Ottoman (Turkish) authorities in the massacres of Armenian and Assyrian Christians in Upper Mesopotamia, between 1914 and 1920, with further attacks on unarmed fleeing civilians conducted by local Arab militias.

In other parts of the country during this period, Kurds became local chiefs and tax farmers in Akkar (Lebanon) and the Qusayr highlands between Antioch and Latakia in northwestern Syria. The Afrin Plateau northwest of Aleppo, just inside what is today Syria, was officially known as the "Sancak of the Kurds" in Ottoman documents. The Millis revolted against the Ottoman government after the death of their leader Ibrahim Pasa and some of them eventually settled for the most part on the Syrian side of the newly drawn Turkish-Syrian border of 1922.

When Maurice Abadie, a French general, was overseeing the French occupation of Syria, he made some observations on the settlements of Kurds in 1920:

Over the course of the past century the Kurds have migrated and spread throughout northern Syria.

Those who have spread to the west of the Euphrates have come from the valleys of Kurdistan. They have gradually settled in and live alongside the Turks, Turkmen, Christians and Arabs, all of whose customs they have adopted to some degree.

=== Treaty of Sèvres and colonial borders ===
Following World War I, the victorious Allied powers and the defeated Ottoman Empire signed the Treaty of Sèvres of 10 August 1920. The treaty stipulated that Ottoman Kurdistan, which included Kurdish inhabited areas in southeastern Turkey and northern Iraq to be given autonomy within the new Turkish Republic, with the choice for full independence within a year. The Kemalist victory in Turkey and subsequent territorial gains during the Turkish War of Independence led to the renegotiated Treaty of Lausanne of 24 July 1923, which made no mention of a future Kurdish state. The majority of Ottoman Kurdish territory was given to Turkey and the rest in British Mandate of Iraq. Two small pockets with Kurdish majority at the border with Turkey (Afrin and Ayn al-Arab) were included in the State of Aleppo who, in contrast to the Druzes, the Alawites, and the Christians, did not receive their own state.

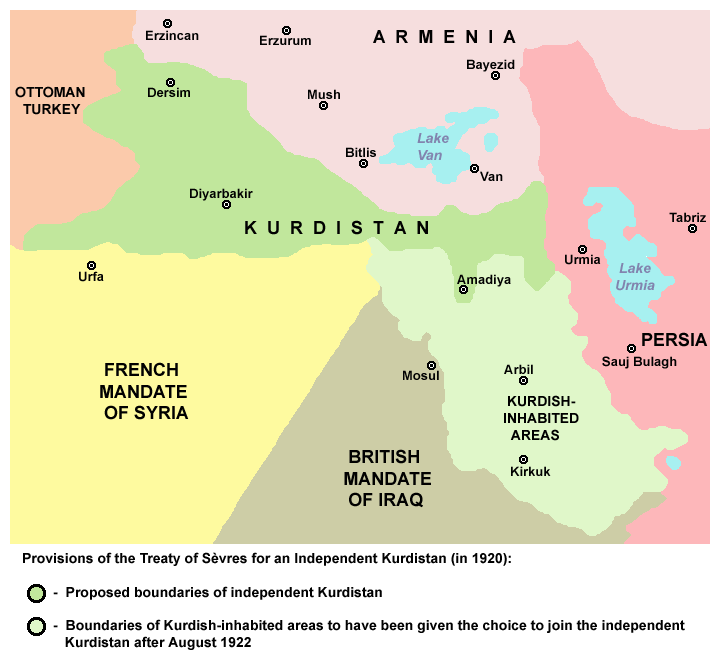
Provisions of the Treaty of Sèvres for an independent Kurdistan (in 1920).

Provisions of the Treaty of Sèvres

=== Immigration from Turkey ===
Waves of Kurdish Tribes and their families arrived into Syria originally came from Turkey in the 1920s. Kurdish immigration waves to Syria's Jazira province started immediately after WWI. After the war, the construction of road networks and the railway extension to Nusaybin have intensified the Kurdish immigration from the Anatolian mountains to Syrian Jazirah. After that, massive waves of Kurds fled their homes in the mountains of Turkey after the failed Kurdish rebellions in Kemalist Turkey. It is estimated that 25,000 Kurds fled at this time to Syria, under French Mandate authorities, who encouraged their immigration, and granted them Syrian citizenship. The French official reports show the existence of at most 45 Kurdish villages in Jazira prior to 1927. In 1927, Hadjo Agha, the chief of the powerful Kurdish tribe Havergan, arrived with more than 600 families in Qubour el-Bid (later renamed al-Qahtaniyah). The mandatory authorities continued to encourage Kurdish immigration into Syria, and a new significant wave of refugees arrived in 1929. The number of Kurds settled in the Jazira province during the 1920s was estimated between 20,000 and 25,000. With the continuous intensive immigration the villages numbered between 700 and 800 in 1939. Consequently, Kurds became majority in the districts of Tigris (later renamed al-Malikiyah and Qamishli, while Arabs remained the majority in Hasakah district. Immigration from Turkey was not limited to the Jazira area. In the 1930s, Kurdish Alevis who fled the persecution of the Turkish army during the Dersim massacre, settled in Mabeta.

=== French Mandate ===
Under the French Mandate of Syria, newly arriving Kurds were granted citizenship by French authorities and enjoyed considerable rights as the French Mandate authority encouraged minority autonomy as part of a divide and rule strategy and recruited heavily from the Kurds and other minority groups, such as Alawite and Druze, for its local armed forces. In 1936, the French forces bombarded Amuda. On 13 August 1937, in a revenge attack, Kurdish tribes sided with Damascus and about 500 men from the Dakkuri, Milan, and Kiki tribes led by the Kurdish tribal leader Sa'ed Agha al-Dakkuri attacked the then predominantly Christian Amuda and burned the town. The town was destroyed and the Christian population, about 300 families, fled to the towns of Qamishli and Hasakah.

==== Kurdish demands for autonomy ====
Early demands for a Kurdish autonomy came from the Kurdish deputy Nuri Kandy of Kurd Dagh, who asked the authorities of the French mandate to grant an administrative autonomy to all the areas with a Kurdish majority in 1924. Also the Kurdish tribes of the Barazi Confederation demanded autonomy for the Kurdish regions within the French Mandate. But their requests were not fulfilled by the French at the time. Between December 1931 and January 1932, the first elections under the new Syrian constitution were held. Among the deputies there were three members of the Syrian Kurdish nationalist Xoybûn (Khoyboun) party from the three different Kurdish enclaves in Syria: Khalil bey Ibn Ibrahim Pacha (Jazira province), Mustafa bey Ibn Shahin (Jarabulus) and Hassan Aouni (Kurd Dagh).

In the mid-1930s, there arose a new autonomist movement in the Jazira province among Kurds and Christians. The Kurdish leaders Hajo Agha, Kaddur Bey, and Khalil Bey Ibrahim Pasha. Hajo Agha was the Kurdish chief of the Heverkan tribal confederation and one of the leaders of the Kurdish nationalist party Xoybûn (Khoyboun). He established himself as the representative of the Kurds in Jazira maintaining the coalition with the Christian notables, who were represented by the Syriac Catholic Patriarch Ignatius Gabriel I Tappouni and Michel Dôme the Armenian Catholic president of the Qamishli municipality. The Kurdish-Christian Coalition wanted French troops to stay in the province in case of Syrian independence, as they feared the nationalist Damascus government would replace minority officials by Muslim Arabs from the capital. The French authorities, although some in their ranks had earlier encouraged this anti-Damascus movement, refused to consider any new status of autonomy inside Syria and even annexed the Alawite State and the Jabal Druze State to the Syrian Republic.

=== Early post-independence period ===
Two early presidents, Husni al-Za'im and also Adib Shishakli, were of Kurdish origin, but they didn't identify as Kurds nor did they speak Kurdish. Shishakli even initiated the policy of prohibiting the Kurdish culture. Osman Sabri and Hamza Diweran along with some Kurdish politicians, founded the Kurdistan Democratic Party of Syria (KDPS) in 1957. The objectives of KDPS were promotion of Kurdish cultural rights, economic progress and democratic change. Following their demands for the recognition of the Kurdish cultural rights, the Party got suppressed by the United Arab Republic and the possession of Kurdish publications or music was enough to be sent to be detained. KDPS was never legally recognized by the Syrian state and remains an underground organization, especially after a crackdown in 1960 during which several of its leaders were arrested, charged with separatism and imprisoned. After the failure of Syrian political union with Egypt in 1961, Syria was declared an Arab Republic in the interim constitution.

==== Jazira census ====
On 23 August 1962, the government conducted a special population census only for the province of Jazira based on reports of illegal infiltration of tens of thousands of Turkish Kurds into Syria. As a result, around 120,000 Kurds in Jazira (20% of Syrian Kurds) were stripped of their Syrian citizenship even though they were in possession of Syrian identity cards. The inhabitants who had Syrian identity cards were told to hand them over to the administration for renewal. However, many of those Kurds who submitted their cards received nothing in return. Many were arbitrarily categorized as ajanib ('foreigners'), while others who did not participate in the census were categorized as maktumin ('unregistered'), an even lower status than the ajanib; for all intents and purposes, these unregistered Kurds did not exist in the eyes of the state. They could not get jobs, become educated, own property or participate in politics. In some cases, classifications varied even within Kurdish families: parents had citizenship but not their children, a child could be a citizen but not his or her brothers and sisters. Those Kurds who lost their citizenship were often dispossessed of their lands, which were given by the state to Arab and Assyrian settlers. A media campaign was launched against the Kurds with slogans such as Save Arabism in Jazira! and Fight the Kurdish Menace!.

These policies in the Jazira region coincided with the beginning of Barzani's uprising in Iraqi Kurdistan and discovery of oilfields in the Kurdish inhabited areas of Syria. In June 1963, Syria took part in the Iraqi military campaign against the Kurds by providing aircraft, armoured vehicles and a force of 6,000 soldiers. Syrian troops crossed the Iraqi border and moved into the Kurdish town of Zakho in pursuit of Barzani's fighters

==== Deprivation of citizenship ====
In 1962, 20 percent of Syria's Kurdish population were stripped of their Syrian citizenship following a very highly controversial census raising concerns among human rights groups. According to the Syrian government, the reason for this enactment was due to groups of Kurds infiltrating the Al-Hasakah Governorate in 1945. The Syrian government claims that the Kurds came from neighboring countries, especially Turkey, and crossed the Syrian border illegally. The government claims that these Kurds settled down, gradually, in the region in cities like Amuda and Qamishli until they accounted for the majority in some of these cities. The government also claims that many Kurds were capable of registering themselves illegally in the Syrian civil registers. The government further speculated that Kurds intended to settle down and acquire property, especially after the issue of the agricultural reform law, to benefit from land redistribution. However, according to Human Rights Watch, the Syrian government falsely claimed that many of the Kurds who were the original inhabitants of the land were foreigners, and in turn, violated their human rights by stripping them of their Syrian citizenship.

The flag of the Democratic Federation of Northern Syria

As a result of government claims of an increase in illegal immigration, the Syrian government decided to conduct a general census on 5 October 1962 in the governorate with claims that its sole purpose was to purify registers and eliminate the alien infiltrators. As a result, the verified registrations of the citizens of Syria were included in the new civil registers. The remaining, which included 100,000 Kurds, were registered as foreigners (or "ajanib") in special registers. Many others did not participate in the census through choice or other circumstances; they are known as "maktoumeen", meaning "unrecorded". Since then, the number of stateless Kurds has grown to more than 200,000. According to Refugees International, there are about 300,000 Kurdish non-citizens in Syria; however, Kurds dispute this number and estimate about 500,000. An independent report has confirmed that there are at least 300,000 non-citizen Kurds living in Syria.

According to the Human Rights Watch, by many accounts, the special census was carried out in an arbitrary manner separating members of the same families and classifying them differently. HRW claims that some Kurds in the same family became citizens while others became foreigners suggesting an inaccuracy in the Syrian government's process; HRW also alleges that some of the Kurds who had served in the Syrian army lost citizenship while those who bribed officials kept theirs. Stateless Kurds also do not have the option of legally relocating to another country because they lack passports or other internationally recognized travel documents. In Syria, other than in the governorate of Al-Hasakah, foreigners cannot be employed at government agencies and state-owned enterprises; they may not legally marry Syrian citizens. Kurds with foreigner status do not have the right to vote in elections or run for public office, and when they attend universities they are often persecuted and cannot be awarded with university degrees. non-citizens Kurds living in Syria are not awarded school certificates and are often unable to travel outside of their provinces.

=== Ba'athist period ===
On 8 March 1963, the military committee of the Syrian Ba'ath Party took power in Syria in a coup d'état. During this period, international and Kurdish human rights organizations have accused the Syrian government of discriminating against the Kurdish minority. Amnesty International also reported that Kurdish human rights activists are mistreated and persecuted.

==== Language restrictions ====
Geographic distribution of the Kurdish languages spoken by Kurds: Northern Kurdish Central Kurdish Southern Kurdish (Gorani is included) / Zazaki mixed dialect areas

The Kurdish language is the second most spoken language in Syria, after Arabic.

The Kurds often speak the Kurdish language in public, unless all those present do not. According to the Human Rights Watch, Kurds in Syria are not allowed to officially use the Kurdish language, are not allowed to register children with Kurdish names, are prohibited to start businesses that do not have Arabic names, are not permitted to build Kurdish private schools and are prohibited from publishing books and other materials written in Kurdish. In 1988 it was prohibited also to sing in non-Arabic language at weddings or festivities.

There are also some "nawar people" (gypsies) who speak Kurdish and call themselves Kurds in some regions.

===== Decree 768 =====
The decree 768 of the year 2000, prohibited shops to sell cassettes or videos in Kurdish language. The decree also encouraged to implement older restrictions of the Kurdish language.

==== Arab cordon ====
The Ba'athist government's policies in the 1970s led to Arabs resettling in majority Kurdish areas. In 1965, the Syrian government decided to create an Arab cordon (Hizam Arabi) in the Jazira region along the Turkish border. The cordon was along the Turkish-Syrian border and 10–15 kilometers wide, stretched from the Iraqi border in the east to Ras Al-Ain in the west. The implementation of the Arab cordon plan began in 1973 and Bedouin Arabs were brought in and resettled in Kurdish areas. The toponymy of the area such as village names were Arabized. According to the original plan, some 140,000 Kurds had to be deported to the southern desert near Al-Raad. Although Kurdish farmers were dispossessed of their lands, they refused to move and give up their houses. Among these Kurdish villagers, those who were designated as alien were not allowed to own property, to repair a crumbling house or to build a new one. In 1976 the further implementation of the arabization policy along the Turkish border was officially dropped by Hafez al Assad. The achieved demographic changes were not reverted, and in 1977 a ban on non-Arabic place names was issued.

==== Newroz protests ====
In March 1986, a few thousand Kurds wearing Kurdish costume gathered in the Kurdish part of Damascus to celebrate the spring festival of Newroz. Police warned them that Kurdish dress was prohibited and they fired on the crowd leaving one person dead. Around 40,000 Kurds took part in his funeral in Qamishli. Also in Afrin, three Kurds were killed during the Newroz demonstrations. After the protests, the Syrian government prohibited the Newroz festivities and established a new holiday on the same day, honoring the mothers.

==== Qamishli riots ====
The flag of Kurdistan is banned in Syria, but it has begun to be flown during the Syrian uprising and civil war.

After an incident in a football stadium in Qamishli, 65 people were killed and more than 160 were injured in days of clashes starting from 12 March. Kurdish sources indicated that Syrian security forces used live ammunition against civilians after clashes broke out at a football match between Kurdish fans of the local team and Arab supporters of a visiting team from the city of Deir al-Zor. The international press reported that nine people were killed on 12 March. According to Amnesty International hundreds of people, mostly Kurds, were arrested after the riots. Kurdish detainees were reportedly tortured and ill-treated. Some Kurdish students were expelled from their universities, reportedly for participating in peaceful protests.

==== KNAS (Kurdnas) formation ====
The Kurdistan National Assembly of Syria was formed to represent Syrian Kurds based on two major conferences, one at the US Senate in March 2006 and the other at the EU parliament in Brussels in 2006. The Kurdistan National Assembly of Syria (KNAS) seeks democracy for Syria and supports granting equal rights to Kurds and other Syrian minorities. They seek to transform Syria into a federal state, with a democratic system and structure for the federal government and provincial governments.

==== Partial citizenship restoration ====
In April 2011, President Assad signed Decree 49 which provided citizenship for Kurds who were registered as foreigners in Hasaka. However, a recent independent report has suggested that the actual number of non-citizens Kurds who obtained their national ID cards following the decree does not exceed 6,000, leaving the remainder of 300,000 non-citizens Kurds living in Syria in a state of uncertainty. One newly nationalized Kurd has been reported as saying: ‘I’m pleased to have my ID card .... But not until the process is completed will I truly trust the intentions of this action. Before my card is activated, I must have an interview, no doubt full of interrogation and intimidation, with State Security. Citizenship should not be a privilege. It is my right.’ According to one researcher, the Kurdish street perceived the measure of providing citizenship as 'not well-intentioned, but simply an attempt to distance Kurds from the developing protest movement of the Syrian Revolution.'

=== Syrian Civil War ===
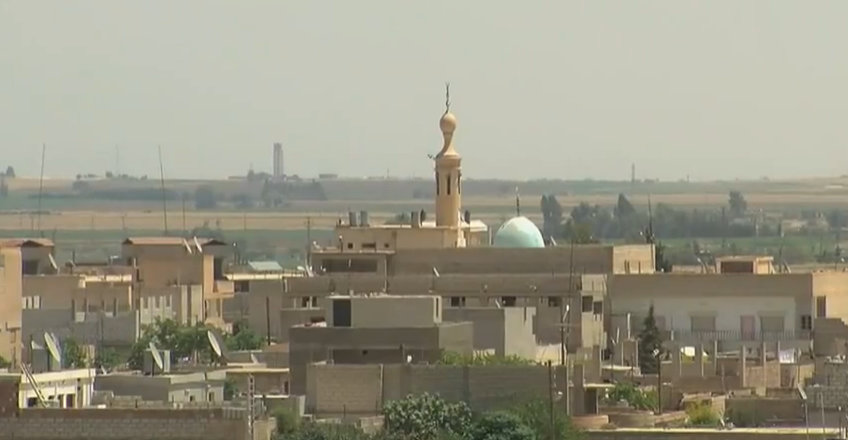
On 22 July 2012, the Arab town of Ras al-Ayn (pictured above) and a series of other towns in the northeastern Syria were captured by the People's Protection Units (YPG).

Following the Tunisian Revolution and the Egyptian Revolution, 4 February 2011 was declared a Day of Rage in Syria by activists through Facebook. Few turned out to protest, but among the few were Kurdish demonstrators in the northeast of the country. On 7 October 2011, Kurdish leader Mashaal Tammo was gunned down in his apartment by masked men widely believed to be government agents. During Tammo's funeral procession the next day in the town of Qamishli, Syrian security forces fired into a crowd of more than 50,000 mourners, killing five people. According to Tammo's son, Fares Tammo, "My father's assassination is the screw in the regime's coffin. They made a big mistake by killing my father." Since then, Kurdish demonstrations became a routine part of the Syrian uprising. In June 2012, the Syrian National Council (SNC), the main opposition group, announced Abdulbaset Sieda, an ethnic Kurd, as their new leader.

==== Kurdish rebellion ====
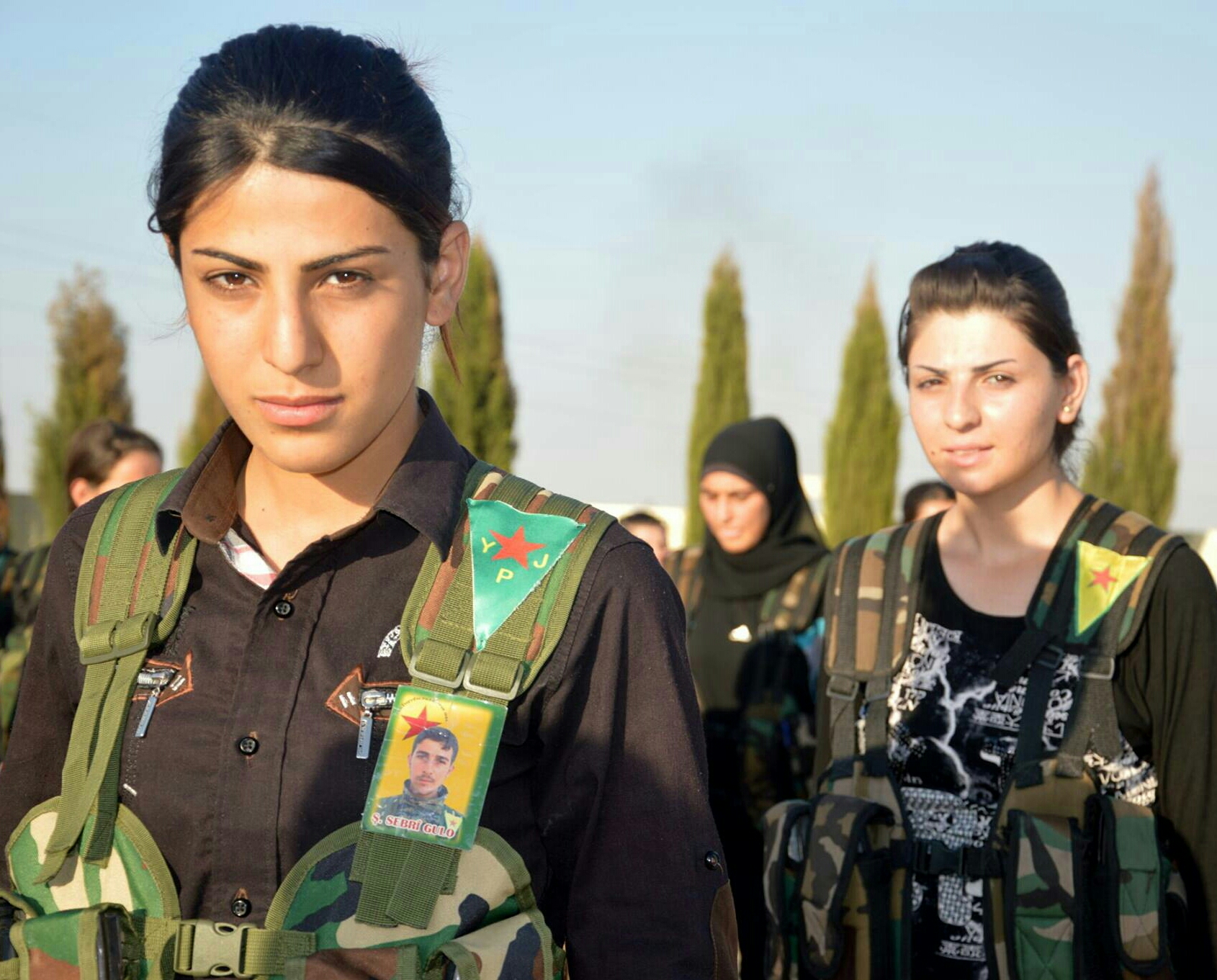
YPG's female units were fighting against ISIS in Syria

Protests in the Kurdish inhabited areas of Syria evolved into armed clashes after the opposition Kurdish Democratic Union Party (PYD) and Kurdish National Council (KNC) signed a cooperation agreement on 12 July 2012 that created the Kurdish Supreme Committee as the governing body of all Kurdish controlled areas.

Under the administration of the Kurdish Supreme Committee, the People's Protection Units (YPG) were created to control the Kurdish inhabited areas in Syria. On 19 July, the YPG captured the city of Kobanê, and the next day captured Amuda and Afrin. The KNC and PYD afterwards formed a joint leadership council to run the captured cities. By 24 July, the Syrian towns of Al-Malikiyah, Ras al-Ayn, Al-Darbasiyah and Al-Muabbada had also come under the control of the People's Protection Units. The only major cities with significant Kurdish populations that remained under government control were Hasaka and Qamishli.

==== Turkish occupation and displacement ====
Kurdish-inhabited Afrin Canton has been occupied by the Turkish Armed Forces and Turkish-backed Free Syrian Army since the Turkish military operation in Afrin in early 2018. Between 150,000 and 200,000 people were displaced due to the Turkish intervention.

On 9 October 2019, Turkey launched Operation Peace Spring, a cross‑border offensive with Turkish Armed Forces and Turkish‑backed Free Syrian Army factions targeting Kurdish‑led forces in northern Syria, particularly around Ras al-Ayn and Tal Abyad. Turkish forces quickly seized control of Ras al‑Ayn and surrounding villages and established a security zone east of the Euphrates, prompting mass displacement of civilians and allegations of human rights abuses.

During the Operation Dawn of Freedom, SDF forces withdrew from Manbij and the surrounding Tell Rifaat region, evacuating their positions in the face of advancing opposition and Turkish-aligned forces.

=== Transitional period ===
==== Conflict with the Syrian transitional government ====
In early January 2026, clashes between the Syrian transitional government forces and Kurdish‑led forces in Aleppo's Sheikh Maqsoud and Ashrafiyah neighbourhoods resulted in government control of those districts and the evacuation of Kurdish fighters and civilians under a ceasefire agreement brokered by international mediators. That further offensive in northeastern Syria caused additional mass displacement among Kurdish civilians, with renewed fighting in parts of Raqqa, Deir ez-Zor, and Al-Hasakah provinces forcing thousands of families to flee toward Qamishli and other urban centers. Overcrowding in shelters, winter conditions, and limited humanitarian capacity intensified living conditions for displaced populations, while repeated ceasefire violations sustained insecurity and hindered stabilization efforts. These developments led to intensified negotiations, culminating in the announcement of a 14-point ceasefire and integration agreement with the SDF on 18 January 2026, which was finalized by 30 January and formally ended the fighting.

==== Recognition ====
On 16 January 2026, Syrian president Ahmed al-Sharaa issued a presidential decree recognising Kurdish Syrians as an integral part of the nation. It also recognised Kurdish as one of Syria's national languages, declared Newroz a national holiday, and announced the restoration of citizenship to Kurdish Syrians. The decree also directed the state to protect Kurdish culture and language, and to support Kurdish-language instruction in public and private schools in Kurdish-majority areas. Later that month, interior minister Anas Khattab ordered implementation of the citizenship measure, including for Kurds registered as stateless. The ministry set 5 February as the deadline for the implementation.

== Influential Syrian Kurds ==
=== Politicians ===
- Ibrahim Hananu (1869–1935), Ottoman municipal official and later a leader of a revolt against the French presence in northern Syria.
- Adib Shishakli (1909–1964), Syrian military leader and President of Syria (1953–1954).
- Ata Bey al-Ayyubi (1877–1951), Prime Minister of Syria (1936) and President of Syria (1943).
- Husni al-Za'im (1897–1949), Prime Minister and President of Syria (1949).
- Husni al-Barazi (1895–1975), Prime Minister of Syria (1942–1943)
- Muhsin al-Barazi (1904–1949), Prime Minister of Syria (1949).
- Khalid Bakdash (1912–1995), leader (1936–1995) of the Syrian Communist Party.
- Qadri Jamil (born 1952), Kurdish politician and one of the leaders of the People's Will Party and the Popular Front for Change and Liberation.
- Mahmoud al-Ayyubi (born 1932), Prime Minister of Syria (1972–1976)
- Muhammad Mustafa Mero (born 1941), Prime Minister of Syria (2000–2003).
- Daham Miro (1921–2010), Kurdish political leader and former chairman of the Kurdistan Democratic Party of Syria.
- Mashaal Tammo (1958–2011), Kurdish Political leader and founder of the Kurdish Future Movement.

=== Singers ===
- Ciwan Haco (born 1957), Kurdish singer.

=== Authors ===
- Cigerxwîn (1903–1984), influential Kurdish writer and poet.
- Osman Sabri (1905–1993), Kurdish poet, writer and journalist.
- Haitham Hussein (born 1978), novelist and journalist.
- Helîm Yûsiv (born 1967), novelist and lawyer.
- Salim Barakat (born 1951), novelist and poet.

=== Scholars ===
- Ahmed Kuftaro (1915–2004), Grand Mufti (1964–2004), the highest Sunni authority in the country.
- Mohamed Said Ramadan Al-Bouti (1929–2013), influential Islamic scholar.
- Muhammad Kurd Ali (1876–1953), historian and literary critic.

=== Actors ===
- Muna Wassef (born 1942), actress.
- Khaled Taja (1939–2012), actor.
- Karess Bashar (born 1976), actress of Kurdish origin.

=== Sports ===
- Jwan Hesso (born 1982), Syrian footballer.
- Kawa Hesso (born 1984), Syrian footballer.
- Haytham Kajjo (1976–2002), Syrian footballer.
- Muhammad Albicho (born 1985), Syrian footballer.
- Ahmad Al Salih (born 1989), Syrian footballer.

== See also ==
- Al-Jazira province
- History of the Kurdish people
- Arabic Belt
- National Organization of Kurdish Youth
- A Modern History of the Kurds by David McDowall
