= Al-Jazira Province =

Former Syrian province

- Province
- Capital: Al-Hasakah

Al-Jazira Province (Arabic: الجزيرة, ܦܢܝܬܐ ܕܓܙܪܬܐ (Classical Syriac), Kurdish: Cazire, French: Djézireh) was an administrative division in the State of Aleppo (1920–25), the State of Syria (1925–1930) and the first decades of the Mandatory Syrian Republic, during the French Mandate of Syria and the Lebanon. It encompassed more or less the present-day Al-Hasakah Governorate and part of the former Ottoman Zor Sanjak, created in 1857.

== Demographics ==
Until the beginning of the 20th century, al-Hasakah Governorate (then called Jazira province) was a "no man's land" primarily reserved for the grazing land of nomadic and semi-sedentary Shammar, Tayy, Baggarah, Jebour and Sharabin Arab tribes (also see map from Mark Sykes in 1907). This steppe area is considered the domain of bedouin Arabs of the Shammar tribe and the semi-sedentary Tayy tribe. The French geographer Pierre Rondot describes the area by saying:

The mountain range of Armenia and Kurdistan falls rather sharply to the south, beyond Mardin, Nusaybin, and Jazirat ibn Umar, towards the steppes of Jazirah, domain of the Arab nomad. It is the border of two worlds: while the Arabs, great nomads whose existence is linked to that of the camel, could not enter the rocky mountain, the Kurds envy the edge of the steppe, relatively well watered and more easy to cultivate than the mountain, where they could push their sheep and install some crops.

=== WWI and the start of immigration from Turkey ===
During World War I and subsequent years, thousands of Assyrians fled their homes in Anatolia after massacres. After the war, the construction of road networks and the railway extension to Nusaybin have intensified the Kurdish immigration from the Anatolian mountains to Syrian Jazirah. After that, massive waves of Kurds fled their homes in the mountains of Turkey due to conflict with Kemalist authorities and settled in Syria. In the 1920s after the failed Kurdish rebellions in Kemalist Turkey, there was a large influx of Kurds to Syria’s Jazira province. It is estimated that 25,000 Kurds fled at this time to Syria, under French Mandate authorities, who encouraged their immigration, and granted them Syrian citizenship. The French official reports show the existence of at most 45 Kurdish villages in Jazira prior to 1927. In 1927, Hadjo Agha, the chief of the powerful Kurdish tribe Havergan, arrived with more than 600 families in Qubour el-Bid (later renamed al-Qahtaniyah). The mandatory authorities continued to encourage Kurdish immigration into Syria, and a new significant wave of refugees arrived in 1929. The number of Kurds settled in the Jazira province during the 1920's was estimated between 20,000 and 25,000. With the continuous intensive immigration the villages numbered between 700 and 800 in 1939. The new refugees were granted citizenship by the French Mandate authorities. Consequently, Kurds became majority in the districts of Tigris (later renamed al-Malikiyah) and Qamishli, while Arabs remained the majority in Hasakah district.

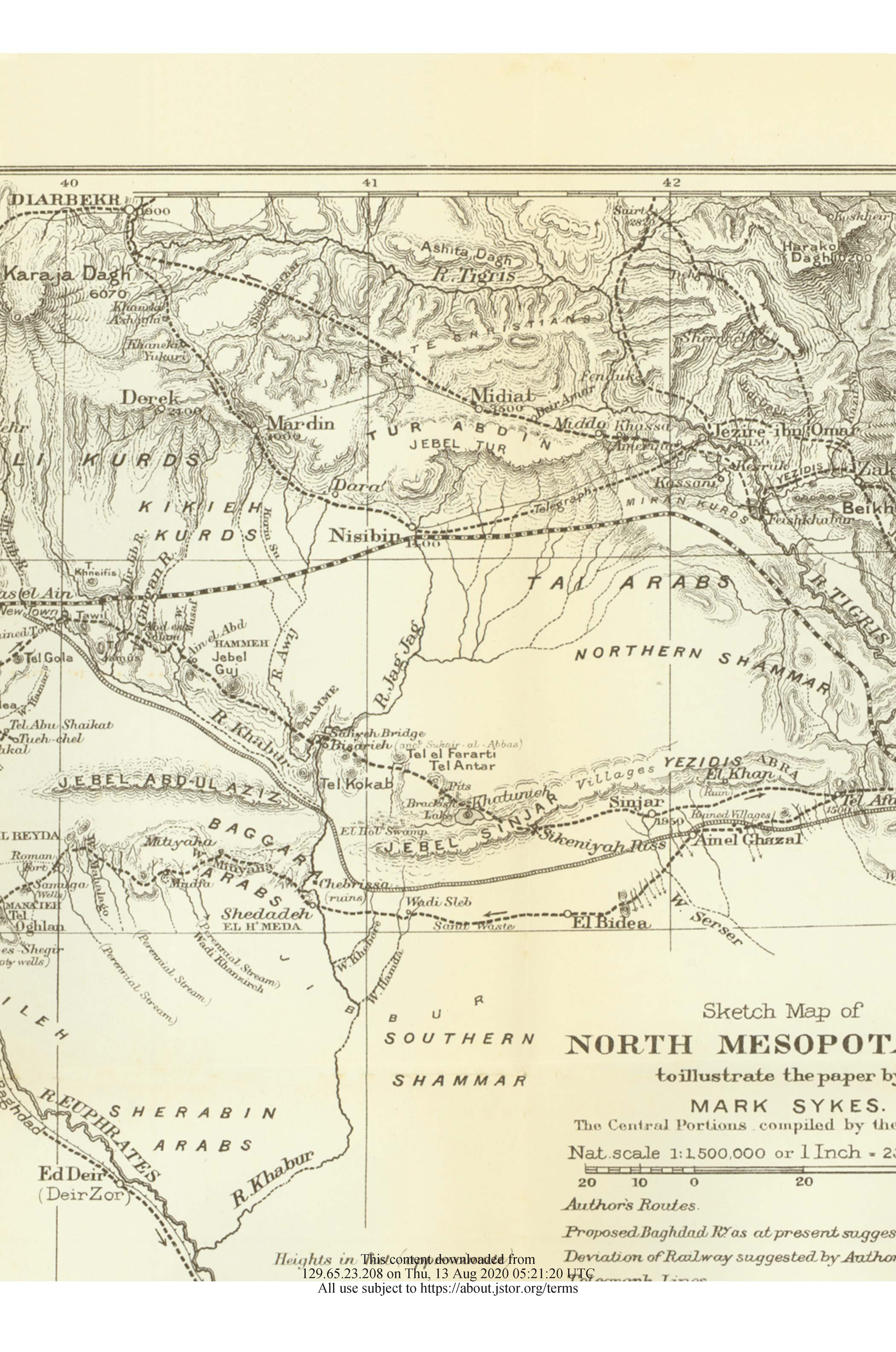
Map drawn for Mark Sykes in 1907 showing distribution of Arab and Kurdish tribes in upper Mesopotamia (including Jazira province) with the train tracks separating Turkey (to the north) from Syria (to the south)

French authorities were not opposed to the streams of Assyrians, Armenians or Kurds who, for various reasons, had left their homes and had found refuge in Syria. The French authorities themselves generally organized the settlement of the refugees. One of the most important of these plans was carried out in Upper Jazira in northeastern Syria where the French built new towns and villages (such as Qamishli) with the intention of housing the refugees considered to be "friendly". This has encouraged the non-Turkish minorities that were under Turkish pressure to leave their ancestral homes and property, they could find refuge and rebuild their lives in relative safety in neighboring Syria. Consequently, the border areas in al-Hasakah Governorate started to have a Kurdish majority, while Arabs remained the majority in river plains and elsewhere.

The French geographer Robert Montagne summarized the situation in 1932 as follows:

We are seeing an increase in village establishment that are either constructed by the Kurds descending from the Anatolian mountains (north of the border) to cultivate or as a sign of increasing settlement of Arab groups with the help of their Armenian and Yezidi farmers.

In 1939, French mandate authorities reported the following population numbers for the different ethnic and religious groups in al-Hasakah governorate.

| District | Arab | Kurd | Christian | Armenian | Yezidi | Assyrian |
|---|---|---|---|---|---|---|
| Hasakah city centre | 7133 | 360 | 5700 | 500 | | |
| Tell Tamer | | | | | | 8767 |
| Ras al-Ayn | 2283 | 1025 | 2263 | | | |
| Shaddadi | 2610 | | 6 | | | |
| Tell Brak | 4509 | 905 | | 200 | | |
| Qamishli city centre | 7990 | 5892 | 14,140 | 3500 | 720 | |
| Amuda | | 11,260 | 1500 | | 720 | |
| Derbasiyeh | 3011 | 7899 | 2382 | | 425 | |
| Shager Bazar | 380 | 3810 | 3 | | | |
| Ain Diwar | | 3608 | 900 | | | |
| Derik (later renamed al-Malikiyah) | 44 | 1685 | 1204 | | | |
| Mustafiyya | 344 | 959 | 50 | | | |
| Derouna Agha | 570 | 5097 | 27 | | | |
| Tel Koger (later renamed Al-Yaarubiyah) | 165 | | | | | |
| Nomadic | 25,000 | | | | | |
| Totals | 54,039 | 42,500 | 28,175 | 4200 | 1865 | 8767 |

According to French mandate census of 1939, the percentage of Kurds in Jazira reached 30% of the total population. This percentage continued to increase due to successive, continuous immigrations. In 1949, the population of the governorate reached 155,643, including an estimated 60,000 Kurds.

=== Immigration waves 1940-1960 ===
Immigration waves continued during the late mandate years and after the establishment of the Syrian Republic.

Historical population
| Year | Pop. | ±% |
|---|---|---|
| 1931 | 44,153 | — |
| 1933 | 64,886 | +47.0% |
| 1935 | 94,596 | +45.8% |
| 1937 | 98,144 | +3.8% |
| 1938 | 103,514 | +5.5% |
| 1939 | 106,052 | +2.5% |
| 1940 | 126,508 | +19.3% |
| 1942 | 136,107 | +7.6% |
| 1943 | 146,001 | +7.3% |
| 1946 | 151,137 | +3.5% |
| 1950 | 159,300 | +5.4% |
| 1953 | 232,104 | +45.7% |
| 1960 | 351,661 | +51.5% |
| 1970 | 468,506 | +33.2% |
| 1981 | 669,756 | +43.0% |
| 2004 | 1,275,118 | +90.4% |
| 2011 | 1,512,000 | +18.6% |

Syrian censuses of 1943 and 1953 in Al-Jazira province
| Religious group | | Population (1943) | Percentage (1943) | Population (1953) | Percentage (1953) |
|---|---|---|---|---|---|
| Muslims | Sunni Muslims | 99,665 | 68.26% | 171,058 | 73.70% |
| Muslims | Other Muslims | 437 | 0.30% | 503 | 0.22% |
| Christians | Syriac Orthodox & Syriac Catholic | 31,764 | 21.76% | 42,626 | 18.37% |
| Christians | Armenians | 9,788 | 6.70% | 12,535 | 5.40% |
| Christians | Other churches | 944 | 0.65% | 1,283 | 0.55% |
| Christians | Total Christians | 42,496 | 29.11% | 56,444 | 24.32% |
| Jews | | 1,938 | 1.33% | 2,350 | 1.01% |
| Yazidis | | 1,475 | 1.01% | 1,749 | 0.75% |
| TOTAL | Al-Jazira province | 146,001 | 100.0% | 232,104 | 100.0% |

Among the Sunni Muslims, mostly Kurds and Arabs, there were about 1,500 Circassians in 1938.

In 1949, there were officially 155,643 inhabitants. The French geographers Fevret and Gibert estimated that there were about 50,000 Arabs, 60,000 Kurds, a few thousands Jews and Yezidis, the rest being Christians of various denominations.

The Kurdish studies expert David McDowall states the following:

The government believed that 'At the beginning of 1945, the Kurds began to infiltrate into al-Hasakeh governorate. They came singly and in groups from neighbouring countries, especially Turkey, crossing illegally along the border from Ras al'Ain to al-Malikiyya. Gradually and illegally, they settled down in the region along the border in major population centres such as Dirbasiyya, Amuda and Malikiyya. Many of these Kurds were able to register themselves illegally in the Syrian civil registers. They were also able to obtain Syrian identity cards through a variety of means, with the help of their relatives and members if their tribes. They did so with the intent of settling down and acquiring property, especially after the issue of the agricultural reform law, so as to benefit from land redistribution.' Official figures available in 1961 showed that in a mere seven year period, between 1954 and 1961, the population of al-Hasakah governorate had increased from 240,000 to 305,000, an increase of 27 per cent which could not possibly be explained merely by natural increase. The government was sufficiently worried by the apparent influx that it carried out a sample census in June 1962 which indicated the real population was probably closer to 340,000. Although these figures may have been exaggerated, they were credible given the actual circumstances. From being lawless and virtually empty prior to 1914, the Jazira had proved to be astonishingly fertile once order was imposed by the French mandate and farming undertaken by the largely Kurdish population.... A strong suspicion that many migrants were entering Syria was inevitable. In Turkey the rapid mechanisation of farming had created huge unemployment and massive labour migration from the 1950s onwards. The fertile but not yet cultivated lands of northern Jazira must have been a strong enticement and the affected frontier was too long feasibly to police it.

=== Current population ===
The inhabitants of al-Hasakah governorate are composed of different ethnic and cultural groups, the larger groups being Arabs and Kurds in addition to a significant large number of Assyrians and a smaller number of Armenians. The population of the governorate, according to the country's official census, was 1,275,118, and was estimated to be 1,377,000 in 2007, and 1,512,000 in 2011. According to the National Association of Arab Youth, in 2012, there were 1717 villages in Al-Hasakah province: 1161 Arab villages, 453 Kurdish villages, 98 Assyrian villages and 53 with mixed populations from the aforementioned ethnicities.

| Arab villages | 1,161 |
| Kurdish villages | 453 |
| Assyrian villages | 98 |
| Mixed Arab–Kurdish villages | 48 |
| Mixed villages | 3 |
| Mixed villages | 2 |
| Total | 1,717 |

== Politics ==
In February 1935, the Italian Consul Alberto Rossi wrote from Aleppo:

The Assyrians immigration in the High Jazira (...) goes on and is supported by the Mandate Power as it facilitates a secret but even more visible tendency: that of the creation of a new autonomous State, in spite of the theoretical discussions on the unity of the mandate. Some ‘mazbata’ have circulated by means of the same authorities (who know how to use this kind of popular petition when it is convenient for them) among the minority populations (Armenians and Kurds). They are asking the Mandatary Power for separation from Syria in order to create their own administration with their center in Deir ez-Zor. The French interest in the ‘Bec de Canard’ has increased after the railway prolongation (built on the back of the Syrians) of Baghdad...

In 1936-1937 there was some autonomist agitation in the province among Assyrians and Kurds, supported by some Arab Bedouins. Its leaders were Michel Dôme, the Armenian Catholic president of the Qamishli municipality, Hajo Agha, the Kurdish chief of the Heverkan tribal confederation and one of the leaders of the Kurdish nationalist party Khoybun (Xoybûn), and the Syriac Catholic Patriarch Ignatius Gabriel I Tappouni. They wanted the French troops to stay in the province in the hypothesis of a Syrian independence, as they feared the nationalist Damascus government would replace minority officials by Muslim Arabs from the capital.

The French authorities, although some in their ranks had earlier encouraged this anti-Damascus movement, as emphasized by the Italian Consul, refused to consider any new status of autonomy inside Syria and even annexed the Alawite State and the Jabal Druze State to the Syrian Republic. The new government in Paris since June 1936 was headed by a Socialist, Léon Blum, after the victory of the Popular Front at the April–May 1936 Parliamentary elections and had a different vision on the future of Syria than the precedent right-wing government that led to the Franco-Syrian Treaty of Independence, signed in September 1936 (but never ratified).
