= SOZ =

SOZ may refer to:

- Solenzara Air Base, France (by IATA code)
- National Organization of Kurdish Youth
- S.O.Z. Soldados o Zombies, Mexican horror television series

== See also ==
- Soz (disambiguation)
