= Soz =

Soz may refer to:

- Sozh River
- Soaz, a genre of poetry in Persian and Urdu
- Saifuddin Soz, Indian professor and politician
- Sonjo language of Tanzania, ISO639 code

== See also ==
- SOZ (disambiguation)
