= Daham Miro =

Chairman of KDPS

Personal details
- Born: January 1921 Sêgirka Mîro, Syria
- Died: November 2010 (aged 89)
- Party: Kurdistan Democratic Party of Syria

Daham Miro (Kurdish: Deham Mîro; Arabic: دهام ميرو) (January 1921-November 2010) was a Syrian Kurdish political leader and former chairman of the Kurdistan Democratic Party of Syria (KDPS). Daham Miro was born in Sêgirka Mîro ("Miro’s three hills") in Syria.

== Early life ==
Born in January 1921 in Sêgirka Mîro in Syria, Miro followed a Quranic School in Ayn Diwar during the 1930s. His family was actively involved in Kurdish political activism, supporting the first Kurdish party in Syria, the Kurdish Democratic Party, established in 1957.

== Political career ==
=== Party Leadership ===
In 1970, Mustafa Barzani attempted to reunify the Kurdish political factions, during which Miro was chosen as the chairman of KDPS. He was re-elected in 1972.

== Persecution ==
Miro and other party leaders were arrested in the summer of 1973 after submitting a memorandum to Syrian President Assad protesting the living conditions of Kurds whose citizenship papers had been confiscated. During their detention, Miro and his fellow leaders endured significant torture.

== Imprisonment ==
In 1976, Amnesty International launched a campaign calling for Miro's release. Despite international pressure, he remained imprisoned until 1981, spending eight years in detention.

== Legacy ==
Even after his release and subsequent political inactivity, Miro continued to command enormous respect among Syrian Kurds for his resistance and commitment to Kurdish rights.

== Family Impact ==
As a result of their political stance, Miro's family faced severe repercussions. A significant portion of their land was confiscated and given to Arab settlers, part of the Ba'athist Arabisation policy targeting the Kurdish region.
