= Amuda cinema fire =

Movie theater in Amuda, Syria

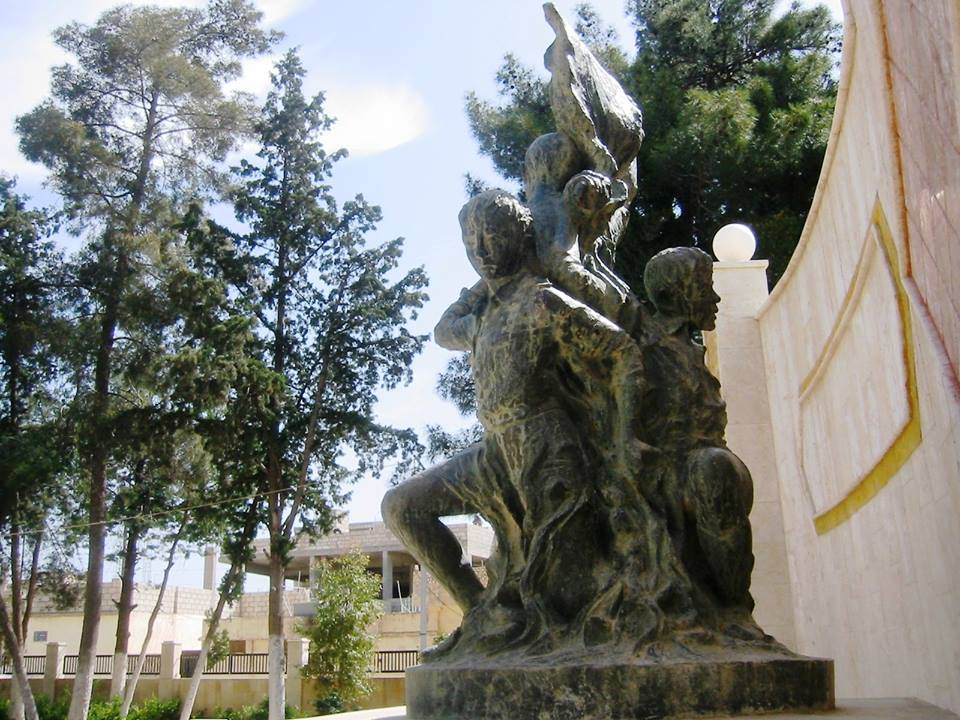
- Memorial statue in Amuda, Syria
- Location: Amuda, Syria
- Type: Structure fire
- Deaths: 200+

Amouda Cinema was a movie theater in Amuda town in Al-Hasakah Governorate of Syria. This cinema burned down in a fire in November 1960 and more than 200 children died inside it, it was believed to have been inspired by ethnic hatred towards Kurds.

== Fire ==
The victims were mostly Kurds younger than 14 years old. The cinema hall had a capacity of about 200 people, but about 500 children were watching the film at the time of fire.

The exits to the cinema had been padlocked and all of the cinema staff had left the building before the fire started. Authorities also prevented onlookers from attempting to save the children, claiming that it was too "dangerous". The children of regime officials did not attend the film. Two Syrian soldiers were stationed at the cinema's entrance. The cinema had four doors, none which were able to be opened during the fire. The film stock, which was old and worn out, caught fire and the flames spread to the wooden roof of the cinema hall.

Many of the victims died of suffocation after a cinema door closed into them. Some of the victims decided to jump off a balcony, but did not realize that the balcony was directly above an open well. A wooden beam fell onto and killed a man named Mohammed Said Agha Daqqouri, who saved 12 children from the fire before his death.

== Aftermath ==
The fire was never investigated by the Syrian government.

The fire permanently mentally and physically scarred a number of survivors. According to the head of Amuda, Muhammad Omar Sheikhmous, there was "not a house left in Amouda without a child martyred from it" as a result of the fire.

The rebuilding of the cinema started on 31 August 2024. The project's area is more than 1100 cubic meters and it costed US$346,326.

== In culture ==
Amouda is Burning is a documentary script about the Amouda Cinema fire by the Kurdish-Syrian writer and lawyer Hasan Draei.
