= Mohammed bin Mahrez Al Wahrani =

Mohammed bin Mahrez Al-Wahrani
- Born: Oran
- Died: 1179; Darayya
- Occupations: scholar, prose writer

Rukn al-Din Abu Abdullah Mohammed ibn Mahrez ibn Mohammed al-Wahrani al-Maghribi (Arabic: محمد بن محرز الوهراني) was a Maghreb writer from the twelfth century AD / 6 AH who lived most of his life in the East. He was born in Oran and grew up there during the period of stagnation of the Almoravid state . He travelled several time to the East in 1156, in which he lived in Damascus in the Zangid state and visited Ayyubid Cairo. He died in Daraya near Damascus. In literature he left many dreams, maqamat and letters, which were achieved by Ibrahim Shaalan and Muhammad Naghsh and collected in a book entitled "Al Wahrani’s dreams, Maqamat and messages"(Original title manamat alwahranii wamuqamatih warasayilihi) in 1968.

== Biography ==
He is Mohammed bin Mahrez bin Muhammad Al Wahrani al-Maghribi. He was born, raised and educated in Oran, in an unknown year during the era of the Almoravid state, possibly at the beginning of the sixth century AH / twelfth century AD. Al-Wahrani witnessed the fall of the Almoravid state and the Almohad takeover of it.

He went on trips and traveled to the East around the year 550 AH / 1156 AD. He left Oran and passed through the island of Sicily, he then moved to the Levant and visited a number of its countries until he finally decided to settle in Damascusduring the days of Nur al-Din Zangi.

Al Wahrani went to Baghdad in the year 555 AH / 1160 AD which was during the days of the Abbasid caliphate and the Sultanate of Arslan Shah Al-Saljuqi. for his poetry.

His trip was unsuccessful, so he returned to Damascus in 556 AH / 1161 AD. After his return from Baghdad, he took up the oratory in Darayya, a village in the Ghouta of Damascus.

Al-Wahrani visited Egypt at least twice. It seems that he visited Cairo for the first time to acquire poetry and enter the Diwan of Inshaa, during the days of Salah al-Din al-Ayyubi before his sultanate. The Diwan of Creation was ranked second in importance after the Diwan of Imprisonment, and the virtuous judge was at its head in the Wilayat of Salah al-Din al-Ayyubi. When Al-Wahrani saw the virtuous judge and Al- Imad Al -Katib Al-Isfahani and that era of their likes in the field of creation, he left and returned to Damascus. Later, he visited Egypt once or more than once and toured in it and worked in trade, but his fortune in making a living from trade was not better than his fortune in doing the same frompoetry.

Al-Wahrani died in Daraya in the year 575 AH in most cases and was buried in the soil of Abu Sulayman al-Darani, and the news of his death reached Cairo on Rajab 17, or it is said that he died in the year 574 AH. Perhaps he did not live long.

== Literary career ==
Al-Wahrani was a writer with many aspects of personality and culture, with a contribution to literature, jurisprudence, science and philosophy, and knowledge of the words of Islamic groups, and he deals with all of this in his traces. He paid attention and was interested literary writing. Omar Farroukh described him as, " He is a funny writer who is skilled in the aspects of the verbal industry in particular, but he leans on the expressions of Badi Al-Zaman Al-Hamadhani a lot and on the expressions of Al-Hariri a little. There is no doubt that he is inferior in writing to a class of al-Hamadhani, al-Hariri, the virtuous judge and al-Imad al-Isfahani. Although he deviated from the way of these people and their way in earnest to humor and ridicule, he descended into open and rebellious oversight and acidity, and he was not able to drive humor and acidity into innocent metaphors as Badi’ al-Zaman and al-Hariri did for example... and al-Wahrani. And the effects of all of them are weak. " Then he declared "Al-Wahrani was a little acquainted with the lofty principles. With the large number of religious sayings mentioned in his works, we cannot defend him from things of lack of piety that come close to being evidence of his heresy. »

Al-Wahrani chose the style of irony and sarcasm in writing, "companion of all funny" and collected many of his letters and comic chapters. The first to write about him is Ibn Khalilkan in the death of notables, he said of him: “ One of the virtuous people, who came from his country to the Egyptian lands during the days of Sultan Salah al-Din, may God Almighty have mercy on him, and his art that permeates the writing industry, when he entered the country and saw the judge there The virtuous and Imad Al-Din Al-Asbahani, the writer and that arena he knew from himself that he was not from their class and his goods did not agree with their existence, so he was fair by seriousness and took the path of humor, and made writings and letters famous for him and attributed to him, and they are abundant in the hands of people, and therein is an indication of the lightness of his soul the softness of his entourage and the perfection of his circumstance, and if he had nothing in it but a great dream, that would suffice him, for he brought in it all his sweetness, and had it not been for its length, he would have remembered it.. ” On the topics of his antiquities, Abdul Qadir Maghdir believes that Al-Wahrani " has harnessed his pen to defame the great scholars of his time, including jurists, writers, doctors and judges, and revealed what is happening in religious circles of earning by religion, embezzling money and manipulating endowment resources. Al-Wahrani exposed many of the social and political evils of his time, and protested against them in his sarcastic style. »

== His books ==
· "Companion of all funny" (Original title: jalīs kull zarifin) contains a number of his letters and comic chapters

· “Al-Manamam” (Original title: almunamati) contains his maqamat and messages, and in it he followed the path of Abu Al-Ala Al-Ma’arri in forgiveness, and Ibn Khallikan praised this book.

Ibrahim Shaalan and Muhammad Naghsh investigated the effects of Al-Wahrani in a book entitled “ Al-Wahrani’s Dreams, Maqamat and Messages” (Original title: manamat alwahranii wamuqamatih warasayilihi) And reviewed by Abdul Aziz Al-Ahwany, and it was published by the Arab writer's house in Cairo in 1968.
