= National Organization of Kurdish Youth =

The National Organization of Kurdish Youth (SOZ) (Rêxistina Niştimanî ya Ciwanên Kurd; المنظمة الوطنية للشباب الكورد (سوز)) is a politically-independent Kurdish youth organization in Syria which was founded in October 2013. Its stated aims are to peacefully construct democracy in Syria, to defend human rights and civil society, and to achieve self-determination for the Kurdish people.

SOZ organizes peaceful demonstrations in Syria calling for an end to the Bashar al-Assad regime and the release of detainees. Members who have sought asylum in Europe organize similar protests.

Leaders include Shibal Ibrahim, Azad Atta, Abdulrahman Jawhar, and Yousef Tamr, and others. Many members have been arrested, tortured and imprisoned by the Syrian government.

== Background ==
Following the onset of the Syrian Uprising in March 2011, Kurdish youth participating in anti-government demonstrations organized local coordinating committees across Damascus and northern Syria.

The National Organization of Youth Kurds (SOZ) was formed as a coalition to consolidate these local youth committees, civil society groups, and independent activists into a unified movement. Operating independently from existing political factions, SOZ engaged in street mobilization, organizing public protests, and issuing messaging critical of the Assad government. Despite these initiatives, internal fragmentation alongside local and international pressures limited the direct political influence of youth organizations within the broader opposition movement.

SOZ functions as a non-partisan organization seeking working relations with both Syrian and Kurdish political groups, including regional entities such as the Kurdistan Regional Government in Iraq. The organization manages administrative offices within Syria and internationally, focusing on Kurdish youth rights and political advocacy

== Definition ==
Political organization that seeks to build a federal democratic system and framing the energies of young people to play an active role in political and social life and works to promote human rights culture and the revival of civil society and defend it. Moreover, adopt rules of procedure and administrative work to strengthen institutional work.

== Announcement ==
It was announced on 21 October 2013 through a press conference at the city of Qamishlo in Rojava (Syrian Kurdistan) (north and north east Syria) by group of active young people (Shapal Ibrahim, Azad Ata, Hisham Shekho and others).

== Organization logo ==
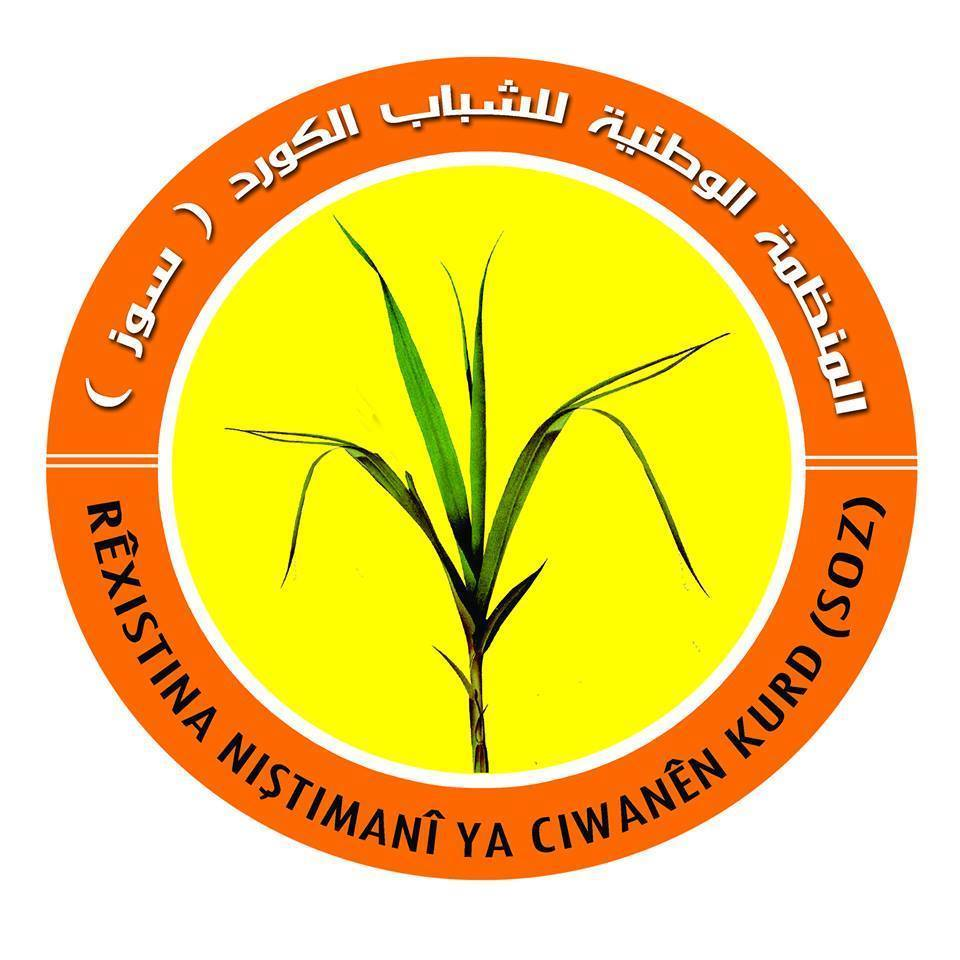
SOZ logo

=== Colors ===
- Orange: refers to youth revolution
- Yellow: refers to the sun that refer to Zoroastrianism (Kurdish old religion)
- Green: arundo (qamish Turkish, çîtik in Kurdish): refers to city of Qamishli, the capital of Western Kurdistan that is famous of it.

== General principles ==
1. Kurdish issue in Syria is an issue of land, people and history.
2. Organization touts all methods of peaceful struggle and building civil society institutions to change the authoritarian regime in all its forms and pillars
3. Activate the Kurdish youth movement and work to unite the energies of young people to be part of a political decision.

== Goals ==
1. Syria is federal pluralistic democratic state with a modern constitution guarantees equal participation in rights and duties among all national, religious and sectarian components.
2. Syria is a state of multi* races, religions and cultures.
3. The official languages of the Syrian state are Arabic, Kurdish and Assyrian.
4. Solving the Kurdish issue through peaceful dialogue on the basis of meeting the legitimate national aspirations of the Kurdish people, according to him free will to organize him political and social affairs and him self-determination on the basis of co-existence.
5. Remove all decrees including Arab belt and Statistics unjust and special laws issued against the Kurdish people in Syria.
6. Working for support the youth at all intellectual, political and social spheres.
7. Interest in the Kurdish language, culture, history and folklore.
8. Defending women and children's issues and the fight against all forms of discrimination against women and considered them as the real core of building a free society.
9. Emphasis on individual freedom and respect human rights in accordance with the principles of international covenants and conventions.
10. Raising the level of awareness and interest in education and work on ending the illiteracy.
11. Preservation of the environment and developing the environmental awareness among young people.
12. Constructive communication with the rest of the national fabric in order to active participation and interaction between the Syrian youth to promote understanding.
13. Distributing the country's wealth in a fair way and attention to economic projects at all levels and encourage investments to establish a free economic system.
14. Encourage convergence and dialogue between the Eastern and Western societies and emphasis on shared values and humanitarian concepts through the submission of accurate reports and analyzes of cultural and religious issues and other major issues between the East and the West, relating to civil society, and set up interactive meetings and use directed media at spreading the culture of Global Citizen.

== Bodies and offices of the organization ==
The organization is composed of domestic and overseas branches.

=== Domestic branch ===
==== Organizational structure ====
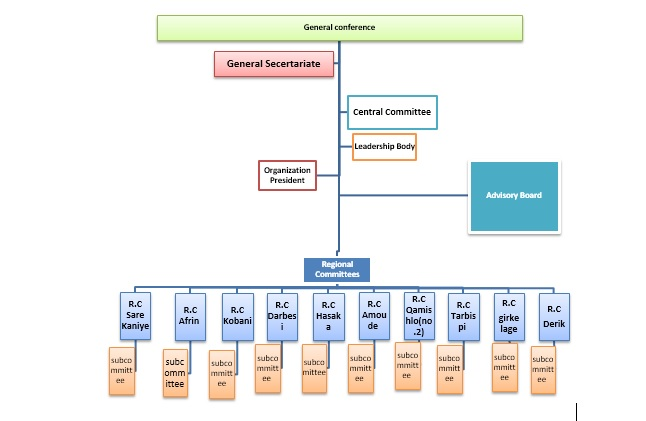

==== Executive structure ====
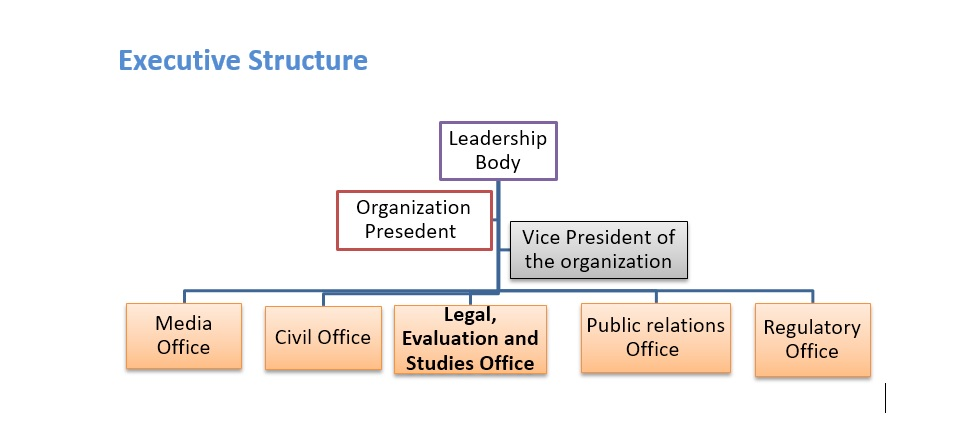

==== General Secretariat ====
- Made up of members of the Central Committee, fifteen members of the Advisory Board, President of the organization, his deputy and members of the leadership. It is the second Authority considered after the General Conference.
- Meets twice between two conferences every two years over four days, or if the Central Committee called for a meeting. The interval between its meeting and the meeting of the Central Committee must be three months at least.

===== Functions (Duties) =====
- General Secretariat have the authority to change one-third of the members of the leadership vote by a majority of two-thirds if the need arises.
- Evaluate the work of the Central Committee and its performance. In addition, the issuance of the necessary decisions.
- All its decisions is binding (obligated)
- Evaluation of the organization's work and performance at various levels and the extent of implementation of the General Conference's decisions.

==== Central Committee ====
- Consist of two members elected from each regional Commission in all Kurdish cities. In addition to the head of the organization and the members of the leadership, that the ratio of women not less than twenty percent in each regional Commission.
- Hold its meetings twice a year in the month of January and June over three days. It is considered the third authority at the organization.
- It has the right to call a meeting of the General Secretariat.
- Each member of the Central Committee is allowed to serve as a member of regional Committee and member of the central committee only and not allowed to hold any additional position.
- Making decisions by simple majority vote.

===== Tasks =====
- Evaluate the performance of the President of the organization and members of the leadership.
- Protect the political and regulatory unity of the organization and take the necessary measures and to stand in the face of attempts that may weaken the organization.
- Confirm the pursuit of its objectives and fulfillment of its programs.
- Discuss the situation of the organization and the problems that is experiencing and take the necessary decisions.
- Do not have the right to change the members of the leadership and the President of the organization, but have the right to direct warnings for each of the head of the organization, the leadership the Offices Managers. Each receiving two yellow cards in a row (the duration of each warning is 3 months) from the Central Committee is frozen and turned to the General Secretariat meeting for discussion
- Study and discuss the complaints against the offices managers, the leadership and the President of the organization and approval of the appropriate recommendations.
- Determine the place and time of holding the General Conference and the meeting of the General Secretariat.
- Do the functions of the judiciary in the organization.

==== President of the organization ====
- To be elected at the General conference.
- Has the same leadership body functions. In addition to representing the organization in all forums, meetings and conferences in coordination with the Office of Public Relations.
- Elected to the electoral cycle of three years.
- Spokesman of the organization.
- Do not entitled to hold the position for more than two consecutive electoral cycle.

==== Vice President of the organization ====
- To be elected at the conference. The owner of the second place after the head of the organization in terms of votes.
- Has the right to do the functions of head of the organization in the event of his absence.
- Has the same leadership body functions. In addition to representing the organization in all forums, meetings and conferences in coordination with the Office of Public Relations.
- Elected to the electoral cycle of three years.
- Do not entitled to hold the position for more than two consecutive electoral cycle.

==== Leading Commission ====
===== Tasks =====
- Work to ensure that the offices of the organization do their functions to the fullest. Its decisions is binding to offices and regional committees.
- Holds the political media's management of the Organization (writing political statements-Determine organization attitude toward the developments and the latest events)
- represent the organization abroad at conferences meetings, and appointments or choose appropriate members of the organization if they are unable to attend those meetings.
- Have the right to call a meeting of the Central Committee.
- Take decisions by simple majority vote.
- Determine the financial exchange priorities and budget of the Organization.
- Have the right to speak on behalf of the organization.
- Create the Kurdish expertise house, which consists of specialists in various spheres (Media * political * Medical * Engineering -....) and use this experience to benefit the Kurdish people.

===== Organizationally =====
- Consists of fourteen members in addition to the head of the organization: nine from the inside homeland, four from abroad.
- To be elected at the General Conference.

==== Regional Committee ====
===== Tasks =====
- To submit periodic reports of the organization activity in the city to the leadership body.
- Election of its representatives for the Central Committee of the Organization. By the number of owners for the total number of members of the organization.
- Administration all matters relating to the organization in the city and it is responsible to the leadership's Commission.
- Work to increase the effectiveness of the organization in the city and work on the implementation of its programs and objectives.
- Issuing statements and local issues in the light of the Organization's program and after approval by the leadership body.
- Work on positive communication with the youth generation in the city and carry out activities and events that will enhance this communication and working to take advantage of their energies to serve the public interest and encourage joining the organization by doing interactive meetings and special seminars related to Youth and do cultural events that will attract this group.

===== Organizationally =====
- Consist of eleven members in each city. Except Qamishlo, which owns two regional committees
- Each regional Committee has its Chairman represent it.
- distribute the members of the regional committee on the organization offices.

==== Subcommittee ====
===== Tasks =====
- elect the members of the regional committee in every city in the subconference.
- Carrying out the tasks entrusted to it by the regional Committee
- Participate in the implementation of the activities carried out by the organization in the city.

===== Organizationally =====
- Consists of ten members
- Meets on per month or when needed.
- Elect its representative.

==== Advisory Council (Board) ====
It consists of loyalists of the organization over the age of 42 years at a minimum, its decisions are not binding but it is relied on to evaluate the work of the Central Committee and the leadership and provide opinion and advice on various issues. Participate in the General Secretariat by ten members.

=== Offices of the organization ===
==== Public Relations Office ====
===== Aim =====
The ongoing work to establish an extensive network of strategic relations between the organization and its various offices and all the governmental and civil organizations and institutions that will benefit the organization, assist, and facilitate the process of applying the program in order to serve the Kurdish people through the formation of three committees:

===== Kurdish relations Committee =====
Building a network of relationships with the Kurdish parties in the four parts of Kurdistan, they play an important role in relations with governmental and civil institutions of the Kurdistan Region of Iraq.

===== Arab Relations Committee =====
The mission

- Communicate with the various parties, governmental and independent non-governmental institutions in order to explain the Kurdish issue and work on the approximation of views. In addition, to cooperate with them in order to serve the Kurdish people and to ensure peace and stability in the region.
- Prepare a paper of the organization's policy to Arab opposition.

===== International Relations Committee =====
- Building sub-committees to communicate with all foreign countries in order to communicate with governmental and non-governmental institutions and political parties in order to take advantage of all the existing capabilities and expertise and building a strong network of relationships.
- Prepare a paper of the organization's policy toward the international community.

====== Tasks ======
- cover all activities of the organization in the media.
- select a network of correspondents in all Kurdish areas to get the latest developments.
- work to provide a written and photographic report three times a month (economic situation, security situation, * service statue ) and use it as a media weapon to put pressure on the two councils in order to make the required changes and solving people's problems and conduct private interviews Union.
- care to raise awareness of the Kurdish national rights, the Kurdish history, international democracy concepts, basic political concepts (autonomy, federalism, self-determination right and rights of the nations), civil society concepts and international laws.
- create a page on Facebook, twitter, Google, YouTube...to post latest organization's activities.
- Setting a clear media policy with regard to raising the level of awareness on all aspects for young people.

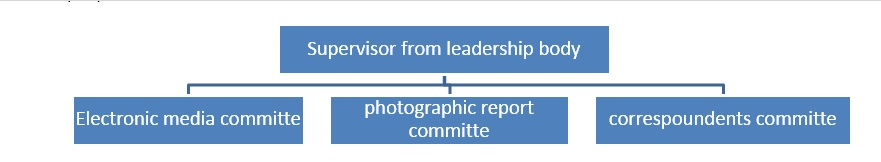

==== Finance Office ====
- Monitor the expenses of the Organization.
- Monitoring and documenting imports of the Organization.
- Receipt the needs˒ file of the regional committees.
- Meet the financial needs of the regional committees as directed by the leadership's Body.
- Managing and following-up payment and collection of monthly contributions

Organizationally:

- Consists of five members: two from the leadership's body and three from the Central Committee.
- Forming a special secret group on Facebook for this office

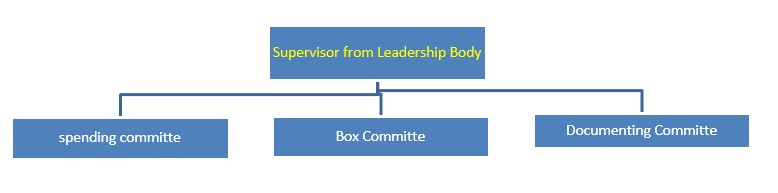

==== Legal, Evaluation and Studies Office ====
===== Tasks =====
- Carry out specialized studies in organizational and administrative aspects and put them in the various committees and offices service so that it can improve its performance.
- Putting rules and principles of casts planning of Organization's offices.
- Prepare all plans that achieve organization's goals and projects in the light of the general policy of the Organization and circulated to the offices˒ organization.
- Follow-up and evaluation of plans periodically and preparing reports on the implementation˒s progress.
- Putting required timetable for the work of the Organization and its offices.
- Providing opinion, advice and assistance to all offices and committees of the organization that is associated to it in matters concerning the activities of the organization.
- Follow the progress of work in all offices and agencies of the Organization and to attend their meetings and study their effectiveness and make the required proposals.
- Providing the necessary proposals to modify or develop rules and regulations, instructions and procedures related to the organization active according to the needs of the labor and emerging variables.
- Prepare periodic reports on the overall carried-out works of the Organization and submit the necessary proposals to develop it.
- Write periodic reports for each activity carried out by the Commission and the problems encountered in the work of each office, sent to the General Authority for archiving and reviewing, and attach the support and appropriate solutions.
- Cooperate with the various offices and agencies of the Organization and help them in doing their duties.
- Doing necessary investigations when there is a possibility of any break of the rules of procedure or organization program.

===== Organizationally =====
- Chaired by the Vice President of the organization.
- Consists of seven members from the regional committees of various cities.

==== Civil Office ====
===== Tasks =====
- Follow-up detainees’ issues.
- Education and human rights education for the various agencies and groups.
- International and regional cooperation in the field of human rights.
- The announcement of support for the accession to international human rights conventions.
- Work on spreading the culture of the people's contribution in government's public policy and find ways and means available and used in the custom of democratic for participation and putting pressure on government institutions and executive bodies.
- Effective communication and networking with all the associations and unions that formed outside the framework of the political councils that represent the truth interface of civil society, which will give a positive impression to the human rights organizations and the Global Society for the Kurdish community, which is on the way to formation and foundation and directing to support it .
- Work on the dissemination and adoption of the principle of transparency as the primary key to get to the real practice of the values of democracy, real and effective contribution to the formulation of public policy. The activation of this item is to communicate with Transparency International Organization and other relevant organizations, to acquire the necessary expertise to transparent achievements.
- Develop a joint program that includes workshops and seminars designed to educate the citizens of the Kurds.
- Spreading the culture of non* violence and dialogue.

===== Organizationally =====
Each regional committee must do two civil activities every month (Seminar * Workshop * Lecture * a panel discussion * publication or distribution of publications). This office is headed by two members of the leadership body. The functions of this office run by two members of the regional Committee in every city.

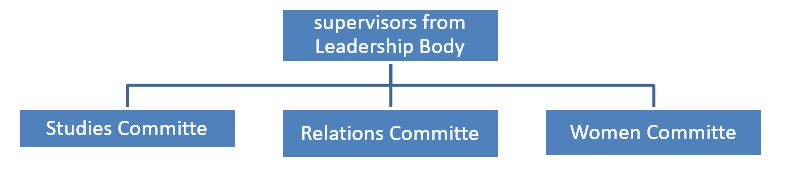

==== Regulatory Office ====
Supervise membership issues and develop regulatory mechanisms within the organization through the formation of three committees:

- Membership Committee: to oversee, study, review the membership applications, and supervise organization's database. It consists of three permanent members of the regional committees members.
- Discipline and Merit Committee: mission to supervise the commitment to the Organization's rules of procedure on organizational sphere, in addition, create an accurate and detailed evaluation and merit's system through which give points for each member according to his activity, interaction and effort to serve the Organization's program and achieve its objectives system. It consists of three permanent members of the regional committees members.
- Membership Studies Committee: do statistical studies about how popular the organization is in various Kurdish towns and the reasons behind it. In addition, how to increase membership in the various regions. It consists of three permanent members of the regional committees members.

=== Overseas branch ===
==== Organizational structure ====
===== Overseas Leadership Body =====
It consist of overseas general coordinators

===== Country administrative Body =====
Consist of Regional committees’ representatives

===== Regional Committees in every city =====
Consist of the members of the organization aboard

==== Executive structure abroad in each country ====
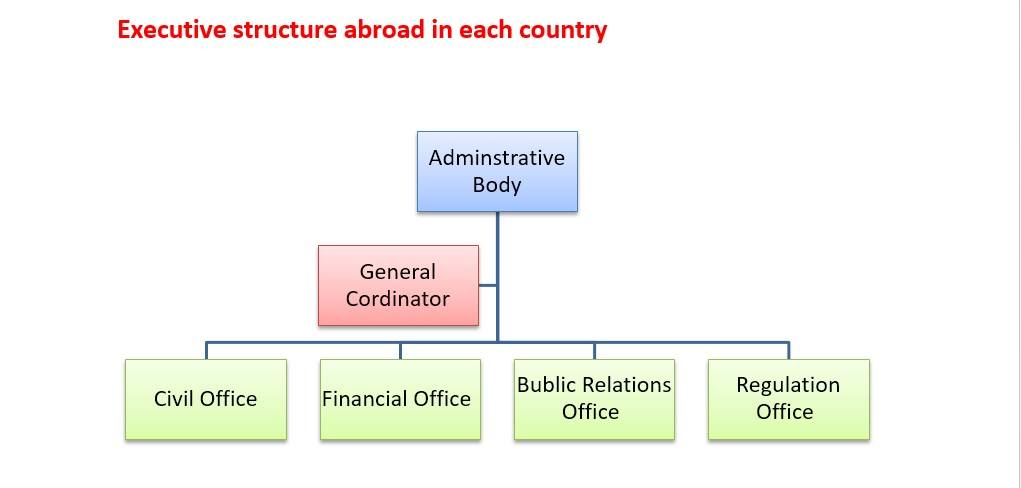

== Conditions of membership of the organization ==
- Age must not be below 15 and over 42, except the members of the Advisory Board, which does not have an end age limit.
- Must believe in the goals and vision of the organization and is willing to work to achieve them.
- Must fill in the organization membership form pledging commitment to the rules of procedure and the goals of the organization and pay the joining fee, which is set by the leadership Commission.
- Must not belong to any political party.
- Must not belong to another organization whose objectives and missions opposite to those ones that believed in the organization.

=== Cancel or freeze Membership ===
The Central Committee has the right to terminate or freeze the membership of any member attributed to him one of the following offenses:

- Neglect and obstruction of the enforcement of the rules of procedure and instructions issued by the organization.
- Doing a Gross misconduct because of negligence causing loss and disruption to the work of the organization.
- Non-observance of rules of conduct and morals or engage in activities that would harm the reputation of the organization.
- If it is proven that he is anti-Kurdish issue and the aspirations of the Kurdish people's right to self-determination.
- Lack of commitment to attend meetings of the Organization without justification, if it reaches three times in a row or four different times and after giving a warning to the member, he is given a month opportunity to correct the situation.

The leadership body has the right to issue the freeze decisions against any member and transferred to the Central Committee to decide on ordering.

== Organization finance ==
The organization's funding sources are:

- association fees and annual subscriptions.
- Contributions and donations from members and others.
- physical funding from overseas branch.
- proceeds of concerts and events and various activities that the organization is working to establish.
- donations and assistance from regional and international organizations that are accepted by the Leadership Body provided they do not conflict with the goals and missions of the organization.
- Donations by the Kurdish rich people and Kurdish companiesˈ owners at the homeland.
- through applying for grants offered by some institutions, civil organizations and human rights organizations.

== See also ==
- Kurds in Syria
