= Al-Mujahidiyah Madrasa =

- الْمَدْرَسَة الْمُجَاهِدِيَّة

Location
- Bab al-Faradis district Damascus; Syria

Information
- Type: madrasa
- Established: 1142
- Founder: Mujahid al-Din bin Bazan bin Yammin al-Kurdu
- Campus: Urban
- Affiliation: Islamic

Al-Mujahidiyah Madrasa (Arabic: الْمَدْرَسَة الْمُجَاهِدِيَّة, romanized: al-Madrasah al-Mujāhidīyah) is a madrasa complex in Damascus, Syria. Built in 1142 by Burid governor Mujahid al-Din bin Bazan bin Yammin al-Kurdi.

== See also ==
- Al-Adiliyah Madrasa
- Az-Zahiriyah Library
