= Helîm Yûsiv =

Syrian Kurdish writer and lawyer

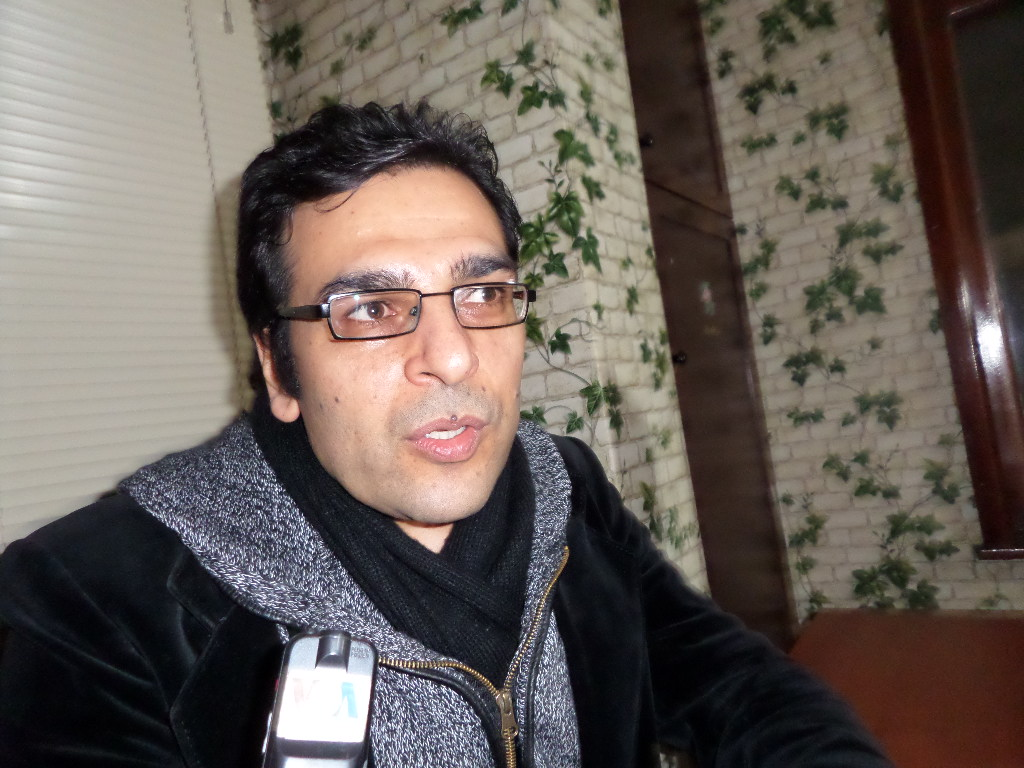
- Helîm Yûsiv (2013)
- Born: 1967 (age 58–59); Amûdê, Syria
- Education: University of Aleppo
- Occupations: Writer, Lawyer
- Writing career
- Language: Kurdish language, Arabic language
- Years active: 1990s–present
- Genre: Fiction

Helîm Yûsiv (Amûdê, 1967) is a Syrian Kurdish writer and lawyer. He studied laws at the University of Aleppo and has published in Lebanon, Turkey and Germany. He writes in both Kurdish and Arabic languages.

== Works (translated titles) ==
- The Pregnant Man (1991, Arabic, Damascus; 1997, Kurdish, Istanbul; 2004, German, Münster)
- The Woman Upstairs (1995, Arabic, Beirut; 1998, Kurdish, Istanbul)
- The Dead Do Not Sleep (1996, Kurdish, Istanbul)
- Sobarto (1999, Kurdish, Arabic, Beirut)
- Mem Without Zin (2003, Kurdish, Istanbul)
- Toothless Fear (2006, Kurdish, Istanbul)
- Love in the Shadow of the Dark Flags (2025, German)
