= Amuda =

Town in Syria

Amuda عَامُودَا
- Town
- Interactive map of Amuda
- Coordinates: 37°06′15″N 40°55′48″E
- Country: Syria
- Governorate: Al-Hasakah
- District: Qamishli
- Subdistrict: Amuda

Population (2011)
  - Total: 25,000
- Time zone: UTC+3 (AST)

Amuda (Arabic: عَامُودَا, romanized: ʿĀmūdā, Kurdish: ئاموودێ, romanized: Amûdê) is a town in Al Hasakah Governorate in northeastern Syria close to the Syria–Turkey border. As a result of the ongoing civil war, Amuda is currently under the civil control of the DAANES and military control of the SDF.

== History ==
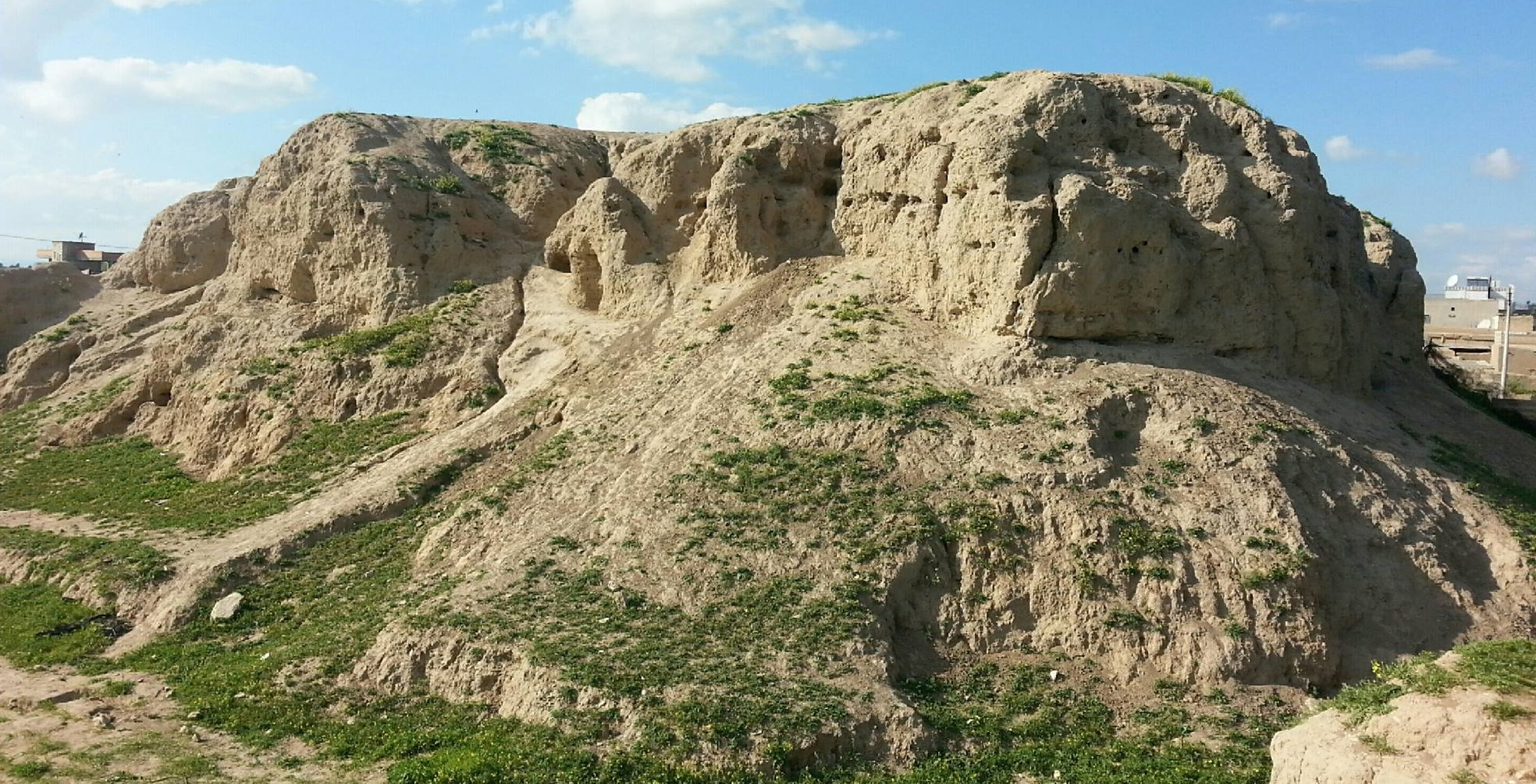
Tell Shermola

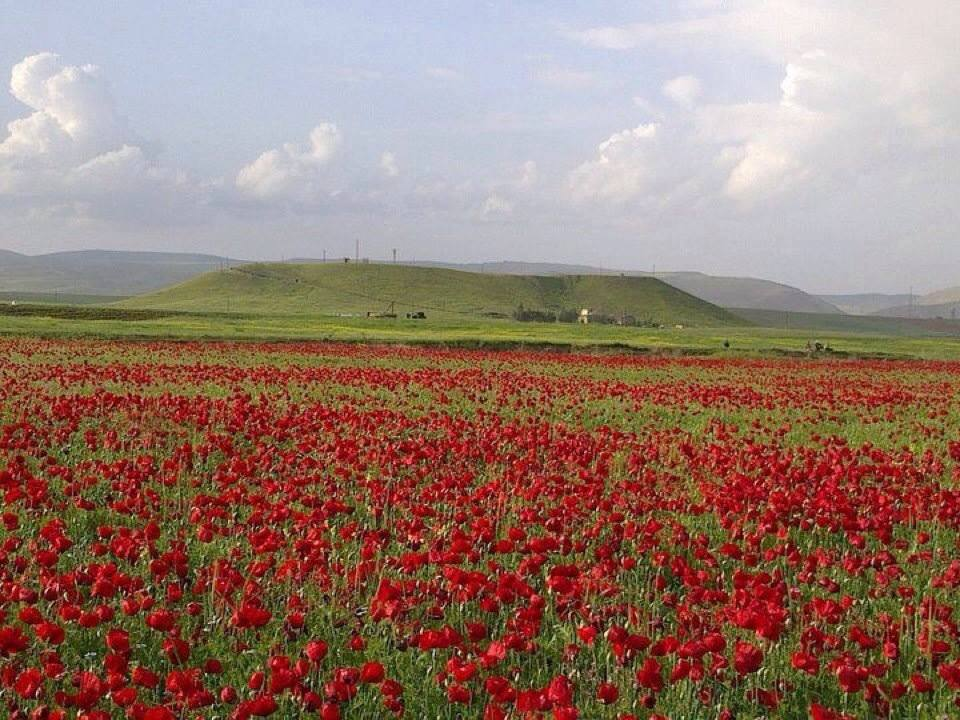
Tell Amuda (Kemaliya)

There are two tells in the area; one inside Amuda itself, and the other on the Turkish side of the border, three kilometers north of the city. In older and some modern literature, the tell inside Amuda is named Tell Amuda, but for locals its name is Tell Shermola, while the tell on the Turkish side is the real Tell Amuda, which had its name changed by the Turkish authorities to Tell Kemaliya.

Tell Shermola revealed evidence for a limited occupation dating to the third millennium BC.

=== Middle Assyrian period ===
Archaeological evidence from Shermola dating to the middle Assyrian period reveal that the city was inhabited by Assyrians as early as the reign of Shalmaneser I (1250 BC).

Shermola is identified by Elisabeth Wagner-Durand and Jeanne-Marie Aynard with the Assyrian city of Kulishinas (Kulišinaš). This identification is based on tablets written in Kulishinas discovered and sold to museums by a dealer who claimed that they were taken from Shermola; hence, the identification is not certain, although Shermola being a Middle Assyrian city is confirmed by archaeology.

=== Modern era ===
The demographics of this area saw a huge shift in the early part of the 20th century. Some Kurdish tribes cooperated with Ottoman authorities in the genocide against Armenian and Assyrian Christians in Upper Mesopotamia. Kurdish tribes attacked and sacked Assyrian and Armenian villages in Albaq District immediately to the north of Hakkari mountains, killing large numbers of villagers. Before the genocide in 1915, the Kaza of Ras-ul-ain, which included Amuda, was made up entirely of total 16.000 Sunni Muslims. Some Christians settled the city after the genocide. In 1936, French forces bombarded Amuda (Tusha Amudi). On 13 August 1937, in a revenge attack, about 500 Kurds from the Dakkuri, Milan, and Kiki tribes attacked the Christians. The Christian population, about 300 families, fled to the towns of Qamishli and Hasakah. In 1941, the Assyrian community of al-Malikiyah was subjected to a vicious assault by Kurds. Even though the assault failed, Assyrians were terrorized and left in large numbers, and the immigration of Kurds from Turkey to the area have resulted in a Kurdish majority in Amuda, al-Malikiyah, and al-Darbasiyah.

On 13 November 1960, after nearly 500 Kurdish students were taken to the cinema forcely, a fire was set in the cinema by the state agents and 283 students died in Amouda cinema. There is a park in Amuda that commemorates the event.

On 12 March 2004, an anti-government uprising took place in the city. As of 2004, Amuda is the fourth largest town in Al-Hasakah governorate.

In July 2017 the 90-year old Mor Elias Church was restored and reopened in the city. As of 2017 only one Assyrian family remains in Amuda.

=== Civil war ===
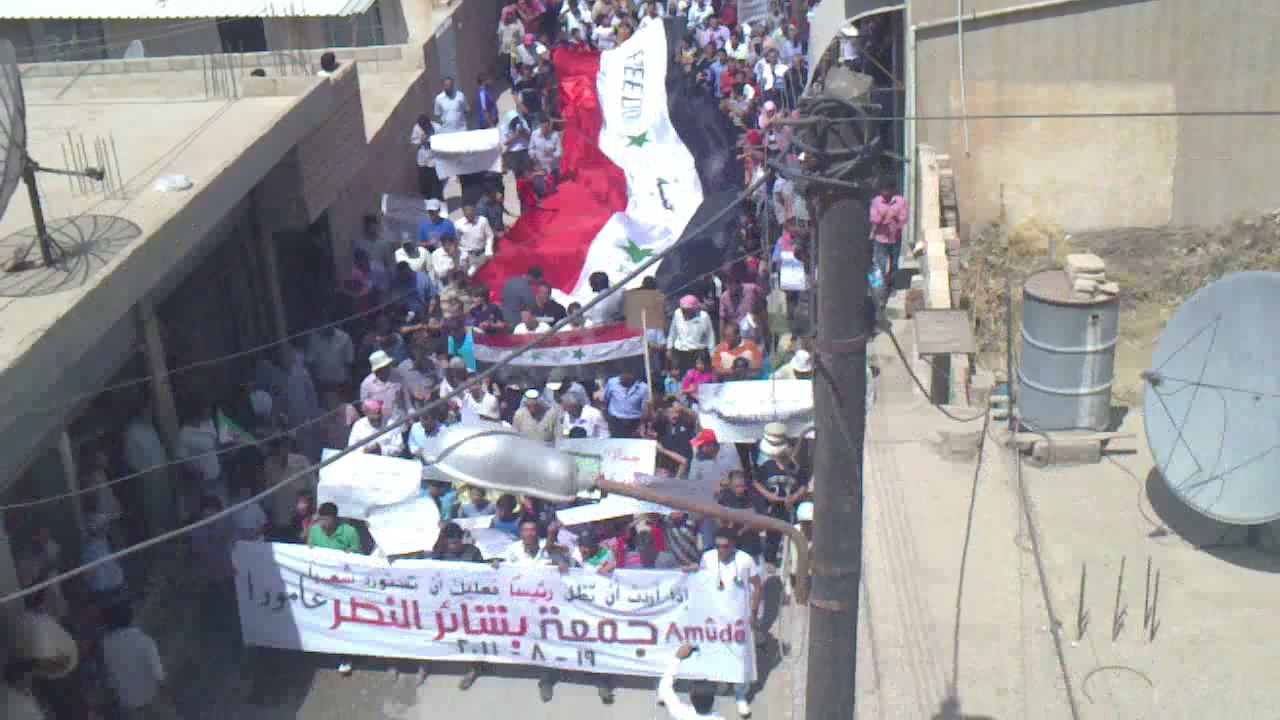
A demonstration against the Syrian government in Amuda on 19 August 2011

With the dawn of the civil war, the rule of the Bashar al-Assad government ended in much of Northern Syria. Free Syrian Army fighters were briefly seen in the town during the July 2012 withdrawal of government troops from the area, but by 21 July 2012 the YPG established control. The early days of Democratic Union Party (PYD) influence in Amuda was not without conflict – in June 2013, clashes took place. Opponents of the PYD stated that fighters had opened fire on protesters following tensions with pro-Free Syrian Army youth committees and rivalling Kurdish groups. The PYD on the other hand stated it had been attacked by a mercenary gang. Due to the onslaught of "Islamic State" fighters, thousands of refugees have moved towards Amuda.

Following the Rojava Revolution, the first meeting of the Democratic Autonomous Administration of the Jazira Canton was held in Amuda following its 21 January 2014 declaration. Qamishli was declared as the Canton's de jure capital, with Amuda acting as such for the time being. The meeting was held at the Hurî Culture and Art Centre, and was attended by the assembly president Ekrem Hiso, his two Arab and Assyrian deputies, and 22 ministers. In July 2014 two new co-mayors were elected for the Canton, by a council gathered in Amuda. Those elected were Hamedi Daham (a sheikh of the Arab Shammar tribe) and Hadiya Yousif (former head of the Women's Protection Units, YPJ). In November 2014 Bernard Kouchner, former foreign minister of France and co-founder of the Médecins Sans Frontières, visited Amuda and met with local senior officials.

Following the Second Northern Syria Buffer Zone agreement, SDF fighters withdrew from the city, leaving it under the military control of the Syrian Army until 2024.

== Amuda under PYD ==
The end of government rule in July 2012 has resulted in a rejuvenation in Kurdish culture in Amuda. Following the departure of the Syrian Army, Kurdish flags could again be sold in its markets, and a large demand for traditional Kurdish clothing likewise appeared. While the town was still under government control, a Kurdish language center was opened in 2011, working under threat. Since the arrival of the YPG the center can operate safely, resulting in an overflow of students. In late 2012 Ronahi TV was founded, the only Syrian television channel that broadcasts in Kurdish (Kurmanji). It has 50 employees, some of them Arabs, presenting "more than 25 political, cultural, and social programs in Kurdish and Arabic".

In August 2015 a Swedish activist group from Malmö (Allt åt Alla) launched the "Rojava Electricity Project", a crowdfunding campaign on the site Indiegogo, to raise money for Amuda. The goal is to, in the span of 23 days, collect $23,000 to help repair the town's Swedish-made generators. An electricity crisis is growing in Rojava, and according to the local economic committee three of Amuda's five generators are not functioning. Once the generators have been fixed using the funds procured through the campaign, the estimate is that 1320 kW will be generated, and that 800 households that are currently cut off will receive 10 hours of electricity a day.

== Demographics ==
In 2004 the population was 26,821, 95% of the inhabitants of Amuda are ethnic Kurds, with a minority of Arabs and Assyrians.

== Churches ==
- Syriac Orthodox Church of Saint Elias (كنيسة مار إلياس الحي للسريان الأرثوذكس)
- Syriac Catholic Church of Saint John the Baptist (كنيسة القديس مار يوحنا المعمدان للسريان الكاثوليك)

== Notable people ==
- Abdulbaset Sieda, politician
- Haitham Hussein, Syrian Kurd novelist, critique writer, and reviewer
- Mahmoud Dahoud, Syrian footballer
- Helîm Yûsiv, Syrian Kurdish writer and lawyer
- Ahmad Chikh Mousa, Syrian kurdish kickboxer at Glory Kickboxing

== See also ==
- Amouda cinema – Movie theater in Amuda, Syria
