= List of Syrian flags =

The following is a list of flags used in Syria.

== Civil and state flags ==
Flag	Date	Use	Description
	2024–2025 (de facto use by the Syrian caretaker government); 2025–present (official)	Flag of Syria	2011 design based on the 1930 flag but with 2:3 ratio and with closer and bigger stars.

== Government flags ==
Flag	Date	Use	Description
	2025–present	Flag of Syrian Government and Syrian army	Emblem of Syria on a green field.
	2025–present	Alternative flag of Syrian Government	Emblem of Syria on a basalt field.

=== Presidential flags and standards ===
Flag	Date	Use	Description
	1941–1958, 1961–1963, 2025–present	Presidential standard of Syria	A horizontal tricolor of green, white, and black, with three red stars along the middle stripe. Ratio of 1∶1.
	1958–1961	Presidential flag of the United Arab Republic	A horizontal tricolor of red, white, and black, with two green stars. The coloured emblem of the United Arab Republic is in the upper hoist corner.
	1963–1972	Presidential standard of Ba'athist Syria	A horizontal tricolor of red, white, and black, with three green stars. Ratio of 1∶1.
	1972–1980	Presidential standard of Ba'athist Syria	A horizontal tricolor of red, white, and black, with the coat of arms of the Federation of Arab Republics in the middle stripe.
	1980–2024	Unofficial presidential standard of Ba'athist Syria	A horizontal tricolor of red, white, and black, with two green stars.

=== Royal flags ===
Flag	Date	Use	Description
	1920	Royal flag of Syria	A horizontal tricolor of black, green, and white, with a crown toward the fly in the center, and a red triangle based at the hoist containing a white eight-pointed star.

=== Shahada flag ===
Flag	Date	Use	Description
	2024–2025 (governmental usage); 2024–present (standard usage)	Alongside the independence flag, a white flag displaying the Shahada was used during the early days of the Syrian caretaker government and its military. The flag is identical to that of the Taliban. It is still used by pro-government Syrians.	A white field featuring the Shahada in an elongated Thuluth script.

== Subdivision flags ==
Flag	Date	Use	Description
	2018–2026	Flag of the Democratic Autonomous Administration of North and East Syria	
	?–2026	Flag of the Jazira Region	
	?–2024	Flag of the Afrin Region	

== Military flags ==
=== Current flags ===
Flag	Date	Use	Description
	2025–present	Flag of the Ministry of Defense	
	2025–present	Flag of the Minister of Defense (2025–2026)	Seen during an official visit by the Deputy Minister of Defense in 2025.
	2025–present	Flag of the Syrian Armed Forces	Seen in parade of Syrian Army.
	2025–present	Flag of the Syrian Republican Guard	Seen in parade of Syrian Army.
	2024–present	Flag of Syrian Navy	Seen in promo video of Syrian Navy and new photos of Navy operations.
	2025–present	Flag of the 42nd Division, Syrian Army	Seen during training exercises of the division in 2025.

=== Former flags ===
==== Armed Forces ====
Flag	Date	Use	Description
	1961–1963	Flag of the Syrian Arab Armed Forces	Used following the dissolution of the United Arab Republic. A green–white–black tricolor with three red stars, featuring a central emblem depicting the Hawk of Quraish. Contemporary examples show the flag bearing inscriptions including "Homeland, Honour, Sincerity!" (وطن شرف إخلاص) and "Syrian Arab Army" (الجيش العربي السوري).
	1963–1972	Flag of the Syrian Arab Armed Forces	Introduced after the 1963 coup d'état. A red–white–black tricolor with three green stars, featuring a central emblem depicting the Hawk of Quraish. As seen in contemporary footage, the flag bears inscriptions including "Homeland, Honour, Sincerity!" (وطن شرف إخلاص) and "Syrian Arab Army" (الجيش العربي السوري).
	1972–1980	Flag of the Syrian Arab Armed Forces	A red–white–black tricolor with three green stars, the coat of arms of the Federation of Arab Republics and with emblem of the Syrian Armed Forces in the top hoist corner.
	1980–2024	Flag of the Syrian Arab Armed Forces	Flag of Syria with emblem of the Syrian Armed Forces in the top hoist corner. Across the top the flag reads "Homeland, Honor, Sincerity!" (وطن شرف إخلاص), and "Syrian Arab Army" (الجيش العربي السوري) across the bottom.
	1945–2024	Flag of the Syrian Arab Army	Green background with the coat of arms of the army in the center.
	post-2007 – 2024	Flag of the Syrian Air Force	Turquoise background with their badge in the center.
	1950–2024	Flag of the Syrian Arab Navy	Still in use after the end of the Ba'athist era.

==== Other flags ====
Flag	Date	Use	Description
	1980–2024	Flag of the Chief of the General Staff	
	1980–2024	Flag of the Ministry of Defense	
	post-2007 – 2024	Flag of the Air Force Intelligence Directorate	
Link to file	post-2012 – 2024	Flag of the National Defence Forces	
	post-1971 – 2024	Flag of the 3rd Armoured Division	
	post-1970 – 2024	Flag of the 7th Mechanized Division	

== Ensigns ==
Flag	Date	Use	Description
	1961–1963, 2024–present	Flag of the Syrian Air Defence Force and Syrian Air Force ensign	

Ba'athist-era

Flag	Date	Use	Description
	1980–2024	Flag of the Syrian Air Defence Force and Syrian Air Force ensign	Air force blue background with the Syrian flag in the upper hoist and the roundel of the Air Force in the center.

== Ethnic flags ==
Flag	Date	Use	Description
	?–present	Flag of the Yazidis	Red and white vertical bicolor with a yellow 24-pointed star in the center.
	?–present	Flag used by Syrian Druze	Five horizontal stripes of green, red, yellow, blue, and white.
	?–present	Flags used by Syrian Turkmens	Azure or turquoise and white vertical bicolor, with a red crescent and star resembling that of Turkey.

== Historical flags ==
=== Arab rule ===
Flag	Date	Use	Description
	661–750	Flag of the Umayyad Caliphate	A white field.
	750–940	Flag of the Abbasid Caliphate	The Black Standard: a simple black field.

=== Crusader states ===
Flag	Date	Use	Description
	1098–1144	Flag of the County of Edessa	
	1098–1144	Banner of the County of Edessa	
	1098–1268	Banner of the Principality of Antioch	
	1102–1289	Banner of the County of Tripoli	

=== Ayyubid rule ===
Flag	Date	Use	Description
	1174–1260	Reconstruction of Saladin's personal standard	A golden field with a crimson double-headed eagle in the center.

=== Mamluk rule ===
Flag	Date	Use	Description
	1260–1516	Flag of the Mamluk Sultanate	
	1260–1516	Flag of the Mamluk Sultanate (Variant)	

=== Ottoman rule ===
Flag	Date	Use	Description
	1516–1793	Flag of the Ottoman Empire	
	1793–1844	Flag of the Ottoman Empire	A red field with a white crescent moon and an eight-pointed star.
	1844–1918	Flag of the Ottoman Empire	A red field with a white crescent moon and a five-pointed star.

=== French rule ===
Flag	Date	Use	Description
	1916–1940	Flag of the French Third Republic	A vertical tricolour of blue, white, and red (proportions 3:2).
	1940–1944	Flag of the French State	A vertical tricolour of blue, white, and red (proportions 3:2).
	1944–1946	Flag of the Provisional Government of the French Republic	A vertical tricolour of blue, white, and red (proportions 3:2).
	1942–1944	Flag of Free France	A vertical tricolour of blue, white, and red with the Cross of Lorraine.

==== States during French mandatory rule ====
Flag	Date	Use	Description
	1920–1925	Flag of the State of Aleppo	
	1920–1925	Flag of the State of Damascus	
	1920–1936	Flag of the Alawite State	
	1921–1924	Flag of the Jabal Druze State	
	1924–1936	Flag of the Jabal Druze State	
	1921–1936	Civil flag of the Jabal Druze State	

=== Hatay state ===
Flag	Date	Use	Description
	1938–1939	Flag of the independent Hatay State	

=== Former Syrian states ===
Flag	Date	Use	Description
	8 March – 24 July 1920	Flag of the Arab Kingdom of Syria	Tricolor consisting of black, green, and white stripes, with a red triangle at the hoist containing a seven-pointed star. 1:2 ratio.
	1920–1922	Flag of the Mandate of Syria	Sky blue field charged with a crescent moon at its center and the flag of France in the upper hoist.
	1922–1925	Flag of the Syrian Federation	Green, white, green triband with the flag of France in the upper hoist.
	1925–1930	Flag of the State of Syria	Green, white, green triband with the flag of France in the upper hoist.
	1930–1950	Flag of the First Syrian Republic	Tricolor consisting of green, white, and black stripes, with three red stars in the middle white stripe. 1:2 ratio.
	1950–1958	Flag of the Second Syrian Republic	Tricolor consisting of green, white, and black stripes, with three red stars in the middle white stripe. 1:2 ratio.
	1958–1961	Flag of the United Arab Republic	Tricolor consisting of red, white, and black stripes, with two green stars in the middle white stripe representing the union of Syria and Egypt. 2:3 ratio.
	1961–1963	Flag of the Second Syrian Republic	Reversion to the 1930 design.
	1963–1972	Flag of the Syrian Arab Republic	Tricolor consisting of red, white, and black stripes, with three green stars in the middle white stripe. 1:2 ratio.
	1972–1980	Flag of Syria in the Federation of Arab Republics	Tricolor consisting of red, white, and black stripes with a golden Hawk of Quraish in the middle white stripe. 2:3 ratio. Flag shared with Egypt and Libya.
	1980–2024	Flag of the Syrian Arab Republic	Reversion to the 1958 design.

== Organization flags ==
=== Pro-Ba'ath and Assad organizations ===
Flag	Date	Use	Description
Current
	2011–present	Flag of Syrian Resistance	Red background with their insignia in the center.
	2014–present	Flag of the Liwa Fatemiyoun	
	2024–present	Flag of the Islamic Resistance Front in Syria	A white field with Arabic calligraphy in red, green, and black, often associated with pan-Arabism. The dominant red letter "ل" in the Arabic text extends upwards, forming a stylized rifle with a clenched fist, a common symbol of the Islamic resistance movements. Below the central inscription, the text "جبهة المقاومة الإسلامية في سوريا" (The Islamic Resistance Front in Syria) identifies the group.
	2012–present	Flag of the Eagles of the Whirlwind	
Former
	2013–2024	Flag of Sootoro	White background with the logo in the middle of center.
	2012–2024	Ceremonial flag of Liwa Abu al-Fadhal al-Abbas	Gold bordered banner with the gold colored text "يا قمر بني هاشم" (O Moon of the Hashemite Clan) in Arabic calligraphy.
	2016–2024	Flag of the Imam Hujja Regiment	
	2012–2018	Flag of the Ba'ath Brigades	
	Post-2013 – 2024	Flag of Liwa al-Quds	

=== Anti-Ba'ath and Assad organizations ===
==== Syrian National Army ====
Flag	Date	Use	Description
	2012–?	Alternative flag of the Mountain Hawks Brigade	
	2012–2015	Flag of the Knights of Justice Brigade	White background with red Arabic text on the top and bottom with a horse's head mixed with the old Syrian flag.
	2013–?	Flag of the Mu'tasim Division	
	2013–2025	Flag of the Sultan Murad Brigade	A red background with golden Arabic text with a golden line separating two lines.
Link to file	2013–2016	Flag of Ahrar al-Sham	
	2016–2025	Flag of Ahrar al-Sham	White background with a green half-flower at the middle-top with the Arabic calligraphy "حركة أحرار الشام الإسلامية" (Ahrar al-Sham Islamic Movement) below it, a green line below that with the text "أحرار الشام" (Ahrar al-Sham) below that.
	2014–2015	Flag of the Hazzm Movement	White background with the Shahada with two swords merged and green Arabic text at the bottom.
	2014–2025	Flag of the Sham Legion	White background with the logo in the center.
	2015–?	A variant of the Syrian opposition flag used by the Descendants of Saladin Brigade	A horizontal tricolor of green, white, and black. On the white stripe are three red symbols spaced side by side: on the left is a cross, in the middle is a Kurdish Sun, and on the right is a crescent.
	2015–2025	Flag of the Jaysh al-Nasr	
	2016–2025	Flag of the Sultan Suleiman Shah Division	
	2018–2025	Flag of the National Front for Liberation	

==== Syrian Revolutionary Command Council ====
Flag	Date	Use	Description
	2014–2015	Flag of the Syrian Revolutionary Command Council	White background with an eagle that is colored with the flag of the Syrian revolution that also has the shape of two hands shaking with the text below it "مجلس قيادة الثورة السورية" and "SYRIAN REVOLUTION COMMAND COUNCIL"
	2013–?	Alternate flag of the 21st Combined Force	Syrian revolutionary flag with the yellow text "تجمع القوة 21" (21st Combined Force) below it.
	2013–?	Former flag of the 21st Combined Force	
	2014–2017	Flag of the Army of Mujahedeen	
	2013–2014	Administration flag of the Islamic Front	White background with the Shahada on top, then the logo in black at the bottom.
	2013–2014	War flag of the Islamic Front	Black background with the Shahada on top, then the logo at the bottom.
	2015–2025	Administration flag of the Jaysh Al Islam	The logo in black on a white background.
	2015–2025	War flag of the Jaysh Al Islam	Same flag as above but with reversed colors.

==== Syrian Salvation Government ====
Flag	Date	Use	Description
Current
Link to file	2015–present	Flag of Ajnad Al-Kavkaz	Black field with white Arabic inscriptions, including the Shahada at the top and the name "أجناد القوقاز" (Ajnad al-Kavkaz) at the bottom, separated by a stylized mountain emblem representing the Caucasus region. Black representing defiance and white symbolizing faith and purity.
	2017–present	Flag of Mujahidin Ghuroba Division	
	2019–present	Flag of the Movement of Salah al-Din the Kurd	Green field with the Shahada (Islamic declaration of faith) inscribed in white Thuluth script.
	2019–present	Flag of the Islamic Jihad Union	
Former
	2012–2025	Flag of Katibat Jabal al-Islam	White field with black Shahada (Islamic declaration of faith) in bold Kufic script, while the Seal of Muhammad, containing the words "Muhammad is the messenger of Allah," is centrally positioned in a circular format. Below, the text "كتيبة جبل الإسلام" (Katibat Jabal al-Islam) identifies the militant group.
	2016–2017	Flag of Junud al-Makhdi	Green field, which may symbolize paradise or religious devotion in Islamic eschatology, with the Shahada inscribed in black and white Kufic script across the center. On the hoist side, a circular seal containing the words “Muhammad is the messenger of Allah”, a common element in jihadist flags.
	2017–2024	Flag of Hay'at Tahrir al-Sham	White field with a teal horizontal stripe and a central circular emblem containing the Shahada in white Arabic calligraphy on a teal background, surrounded by a black-and-white Greek key pattern.
	2018–2024	Flag of the Syrian Salvation Government	A horizontal tricolor of green, white, and black, with the Shahada in red on the white stripe.

==== Other Free Syrian Army affiliated organizations ====
Flag	Date	Use	Description
	2012–2024	Flag of Ansar al-Sham	
	2014–2015	Flag of the Unified Military Command of Eastern Ghouta	Black pennant with a yellow border, with white Shahada calligraphy.
	2012–2016	Flag of the Leon Sedov Brigade	Plain red banner.

=== Salafi Jihadist groups ===
Flag	Date	Use	Description
Current
	2012–present	Flag of the Imam Bukhari Jamaat	Black background with the Shahada in white with the text "جماعة الإمام البخاري" (Imam Bukhari Jamaat) under it.
	2014–present	Flag of Ansar al-Din Front	
	2014–present	Flag of Katibat al-Tawhid wal-Jihad	
	2006–present	Flag of Fatah al-Islam	
	2025–present	Flag of Saraya Ansar al-Sunnah	
Former
	2012–2016	Flag of Jabhat al-Nusra	
	2016–2017	Flag of Jabhat al-Nusra	
	2012–2016	Flag of Jaysh Muhammad in Bilad al-Sham	
	2014–2015	Flag of the Mujahideen Shura Council	
	2014–2017	Flag of Jund al-Aqsa	Black background with white Shahada calligraphy with the text "جند الأقصى" (Jund al-Aqsa) below it.
	2018–2020	Flag of the Rouse the Believers Operations Room	
	2018–2025	Flag of Ansar al-Tawhid	
	2018–2025	Flag of Hurras al-Din	
	2018–2025	Flag of Hurras al-Din	Same flag as above but reversed colors.
	2014–2016	Flag of Harakat Sham al-Islam	Black background with a bent line with the crescent joint, under them is the shahada text with another Arabic text at the bottom.
	2001–2003	Flag of Ansar al-Islam in Kurdistan	
	2007–2025	Flag of Jama'at Ansar al-Islam	
	2020–2023	Flag of Jihad Coordination	
	2020–2022	Flag of the Ansar Fighters Brigade	
	2007–2016	Flag of the Caucasian Emirate	
	2013–2017	Flag of the Ajnad al-Sham	Black background with white Shahada calligraphy with the text "أجناد الشام" (Ajnad al-Sham) under it.
	2012–2025	Flag of Liwa al-Muhajireen wal-Ansar	Black background with a white Shahada above a sword with the text "لواء المهاجرون والأنصار" (Liwa al-Muhajireen wal-Ansar) under it.
	2013–2014	Flag of the Green Battalion	
	2012–2015	Flag of Liwaa al-Umma	Black background with the Shahada text with a sword at the bottom of it with another Arabic text on the bottom of it.
	2012–2016	Flag of the Islamic Muthanna Movement	

=== Kurdish and pro-Kurdish organizations ===
Flag	Date	Use	Description
Current
	10 October 2015 – 25 August 2026	Flag of the Syrian Democratic Forces	Light yellow background with the map of Syria (Including the disputed Hatay Province) with the Euphrates as well with the text below it, "قوات سوريا الديمقراطية", and "Hêzên Sûriya Demokratîk", and "ܚܝ̈ܠܘܬܐ ܕܣܘܪܝܐ ܕܝܡܩܪܛܝܬܐ" all translating to the Syrian Democratic Forces.
	2011–present	Flag of the People's Defense Units	Yellow pennant with a green border with a green-edged red star in the center and the letters "YPG" on the left, bottom, and right of the star, respectively.
	2011–present	Flag of the YPG International	Yellow pennant with a green border, a horizontal black stripe with the word "ENTERNASYONEL" in white, and a green-edged red star laid over the black stripe containing the letters "YPG" in white.
	April 2013 – present	Flag of the Women's Protection Units	Green pennant with a yellow border with a yellow-edged red star in the center and the letters "YPJ" on the left, bottom, and right of the star, respectively.
	2011–present	Flag of the Movement for a Democratic Society	
	?–present	Flag of the Al-Sanadid Forces	
	?–present	Flag of the Seljuk Brigade	
	2013–present	Flag of the Syriac Military Council	
	?–present	Flag of the Syriac Military Council	
	2019–present	Flag of the Martyr Nubar Ozanyan Brigade	
Link to File	2016–present	Flag of the Manbij Military Council	
	?–present	Flag of the Euphrates Liberation Brigade	
Link to File	?–present	Flag of the Al-Bab Military Council	
Link to File	?–present	Flag of the Jarabulus Military Council	
Link to File	?–present	Flag of the Serê Kaniyê Military Council	
Link to File	?–present	Flag of the Tal Abyad Military Council	
	?–present	Flag of the International Freedom Battalion	
	2005–present	Flag of the Kurdistan Workers' Party	
	?–present	Flag of the Marxist–Leninist Communist Party (Turkey)	
	?–present	Flag of the Communist Party of Turkey/Marxist–Leninist	
	?–present	Flag of the Liberation Army of the Workers and Peasants of Turkey	
	?–present	Flag of the Maoist Communist Party of Turkey	
	?–present	Flag of the United Freedom Forces	
	?–present	Flag of the Marxist–Leninist Armed Propaganda Unit	
	?–present	Flag of the Revolutionary Communard Party	
	?–present	Flag of Türkiye Devrim Partisi	
	?–present	Flag of Sosyal İsyan	
	?–present	Flag of the Kadın Özgürlük Gücü	
	2014–present	Flag of the Marxist–Leninist Party (Communist Reconstruction)	
	?–present	Flag of the Communist Labour Party of Turkey/Leninist	
	?–present	Flag of the Revolutionary Communard Party/Birli	
	?–present	Flag of the Revolutionary Union for Internationalist Solidarity	
	?–present	Flag of the Bob Crow Brigade	
	2017–present	Flag of Anarchist Struggle	
	?–present	Flag of the Henri Krasucki Brigade	
Former
	2014–2018	Flag of Liwa Thuwar al-Raqqa	
	2016–2026	Flag of the Deir ez-Zor Military Council	
Link to File	?–2026	Flag of the Asayish	
	?–2026	Flag of the Self-Defense Forces (NES regions)	
	2000–2025	Flag of the People's Defence Forces	
	2004–2025	Flag of the Free Women's Units	
	2014–2015	Flag of the People's Liberation Faction	
	?–2017	Flag of Devrimci Karargâh	
	?–2018	Flag of the International Revolutionary People's Guerrilla Forces	
	?–2018	Flag of the Queer Insurrection and Liberation Army	

== Political party flags ==
Flag	Date	Use	Description
Current
	1932–present	Flag of Syrian Social Nationalist Party	Black background with their logo.
	1986–present	Flag of Syrian Communist Party (Bakdash)	Red background with a yellow Hammer and Sickle
	2017–present	Flag of Democratic Union Party	White background with their emblem.
	2017–2025	Flag of Turkistan Islamic Party	Black field with the Shahada at the top in calligraphy. Below, in smaller Arabic script, the text reads “الحزب الإسلامي التركستاني لنصرة أهل الشام” (Turkistan Islamic Party for the Support of the People of al-Sham). Black represents militancy and religious struggle, and white symbolizes purity and faith.
	2024–2025	Flag of Turkistan Islamic Party	
Former
	1947–2025	Flag of the Ba'ath Party	Black, white and green horizontal rectangles with a red flipped triangle to the left hoist.
	1947–2025	Flag of the Arab Socialist Ba'ath Party – Syria Region	Black, white and green horizontal rectangles with a red flipped triangle to the left hoist.
	1947–2025	Flag of the Ba'ath Party (Syrian-dominated faction)	Black, white and green horizontal rectangles with a red flipped triangle to the left hoist.
Link to File	2000–2005	Flag of Bethnahrin National Council	Blue background with a 32-pointed yellow star and wheats crossed below it, below the wheats are Syriac Aramaic text and the text "GHB". On the top left hoist is a red shooting star.
	2013–2024	Flag of Arab Nationalist Guard	Black background with the emblem colors switched.
