= Anarchism in Syria =

Anarchism in Syria emerged as a largely disorganized movement during the authoritarian rule of the Assad government, but following the initiation of the Arab Spring has been a particularly notable factor in the Rojava conflict during the civil uprising phase of the Syrian civil war.

== History ==
In the late 19th century, Syrians were at the forefront of the Arab anarchist movements in Egypt and Beirut, spreading anarchist ideas through the publication the radical periodicals Al Hilal and Al Muqtataf and organizing radical theatre performances.

Following the independence of Syria from France at the end of World War II, the new Syrian Republic was constituted as a parliamentary democracy. Despite a brief period of military dictatorship under Adib Shishakli during the early 1950s, parliamentarism was restored in 1954. However, power was still largely concentrated in the hands of the military, with the weakness of the parliamentary system leading to the rise of socialist and nationalist ideologies, particularly Nasserism and Ba'athism. After briefly uniting with Egypt to form the United Arab Republic, a coup d'état restored Syrian independence in 1961. But an unstable political climate led to another coup d'état in 1963, which brought Syria under the rule of the Arab Socialist Ba'ath Party.

A power struggle within the party eventually culminated in the seizure of power by a military faction led by Hafez al-Assad, who became the President of Syria. Assad oversaw the transformation of Syria into an authoritarian one-party state, gave more space to private property, organized state services along sectarian lines and created a cult of personality around himself. When Hafez al-Assad died in 2000, his son Bashar al-Assad succeeded him as president. The new political climate gave way to the Damascus Spring, which called for a number of reforms including an end to the state of emergency that had been imposed since 1963. However, this movement was suppressed by the government, which intensified authoritarian rule in the country and introduced a number of neoliberal market reforms.

Due to the authoritarianism of the Assad government, the anarchist movement was rather limited in its organizing capacity. Nevertheless, a number of Syrian individuals began to become prominent voices in the wider Arab anarchist movement, including Mazen Kamalmaz, Nader Atassi and Omar Aziz. It wasn't until the outbreak of the civil uprising in 2011 that the Syrian anarchist movement took on a more organized form.

=== Syrian civil uprising ===
When the Syrian civil uprising first broke out on March 15, 2011, a number of Syrian anarchists were among the participants. The anarchist Omar Aziz, who had recently returned to the country, helped to distribute humanitarian aid in the areas of Damascus under attack by the Assad government. Inspired by the solidarity and mutual aid he had experienced, Aziz published The Formation of Local Councils in November 2011, detailing a vision of self-governance as a route for emancipation from the state. The paper quickly became one of the core theoretical proposals for revolutionary strategy, circulated among Syrians that were rising up against the Assad government. Revolutionary councils subsequently began to form at district and city levels, both in rebel-held and government-held territory, to ensure people were provided with basic services, to coordinate local committees and liaise with the nascent armed resistance, taking over many of the functions that were previously held by the state. From these local organizations, a number of umbrella groups formed to coordinate action on a regional and national level, including the Local Coordination Committees (LCC) and the Syrian Revolution General Commission (SRGC).

However, with the escalation of the conflict, the grassroots elements of the Syrian civil uprising began to face repression, both by the Assad government and by members of the Syrian opposition. In government-held territory, Omar Aziz was arrested by the Air Force Intelligence Directorate and detained in an overcrowded prison, where he died from health complications in February 2013. In rebel-held territory such as Raqqa, Idlib and Aleppo, Islamist groups such as the Al-Nusra Front and the Islamic State of Iraq and the Levant began to take power away from the local councils and transferred it into the hands of Sharia courts, to the protest of the local populations.

Nevertheless, local councils continued to grow throughout Syria. In July 2013, 128 local councils were listed by the Syrian Nonviolence Movement. And according to the Local Administration Council Unit, by March 2016, an estimated 395 local councils existed in rebel-held territories. But these newly created councils were largely excluded from political participation by the Syrian National Council, so resolved to form their own national organization.

=== Rojava conflict ===
On January 16, 2011, the Movement for a Democratic Society (TEV-DEM) was established by the Democratic Union Party (PYD) with the goal of organizing northern Syria along the lines of democratic confederalism, a system of self-governance inspired by the libertarian socialist theories of Murray Bookchin. In July 2012, the People's Protection Units (YPG) captured the Kurdish cities of Kobanî, Amuda and Efrin without resistance, after the Syrian Arab Army pulled out of the cities to fight elsewhere, and began to establish a self-governed autonomous region in Northern Syria. On January 9, 2014, the PYD officially announced the autonomy of the cantons in Northern Syria. An Autonomous Administration was constituted and popular assemblies were established by its residents.

On September 15, 2014, the Islamic State of Iraq and the Levant launched the Siege of Kobanî, the culmination of a year-long offensive into northern Syria. But by late January 2015, the YPG-led forces recapture the city, driving ISIL back. Some of the defenders of Kobanî were made up by international volunteers of the United Freedom Forces, including the Turkish green anarchist group Social Insurrection, which had been founded in Tuzluçayır in 2013. The internationalist participation in the battle for Kobanî inspired the formation of the International Freedom Battalion (IFB), which united left-wing foreign fighters in support of the Autonomous Administration.

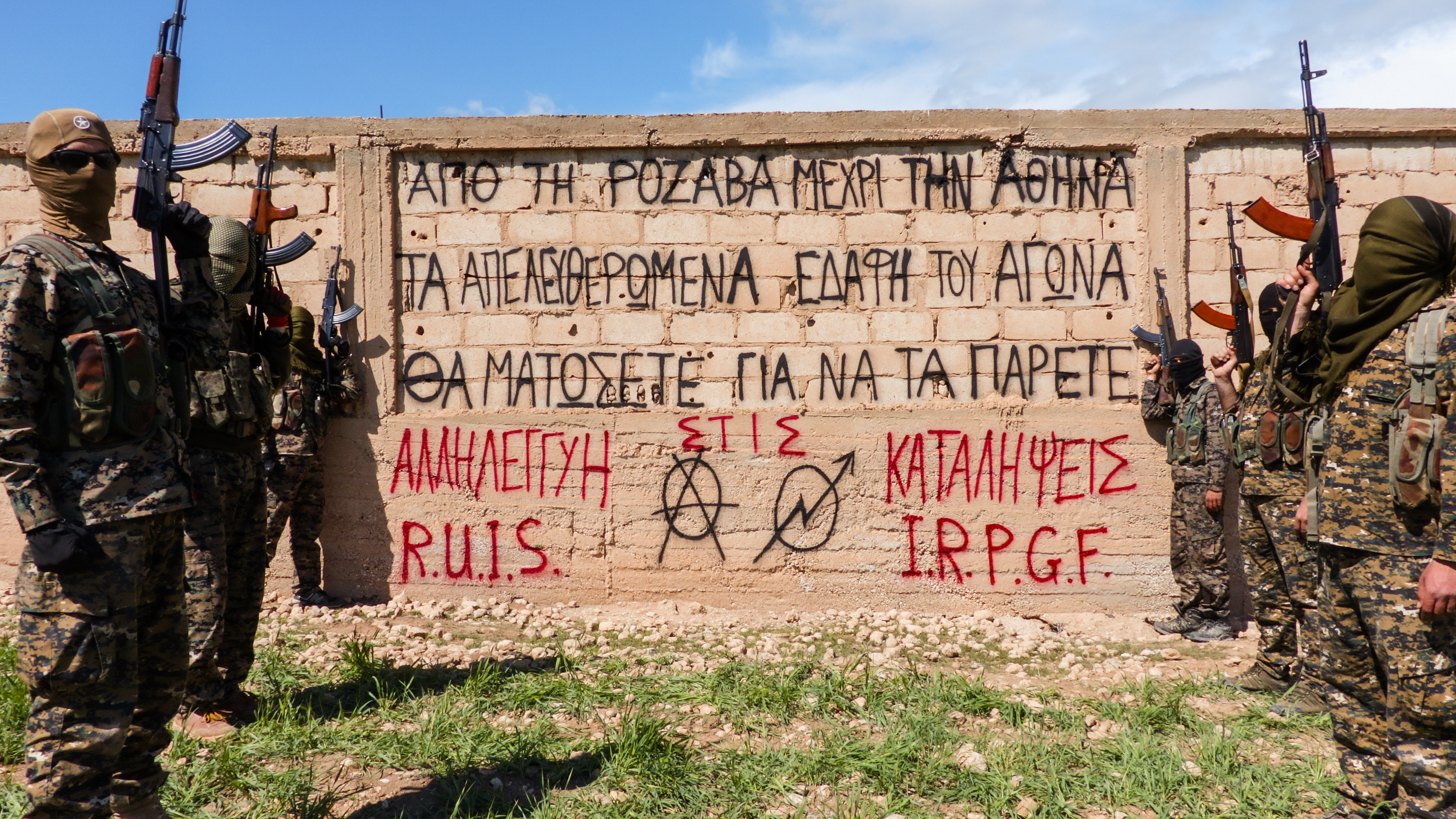
Members of RUIS in Rojava.

The first of the anarchist detachments to volunteer was the Revolutionary Union for Internationalist Solidarity (RUIS), a Greek anarcho-communist squad founded in April 2015. On March 31, 2017, the International Revolutionary People's Guerrilla Forces (IRPGF) was established and affiliated to the IFB, becoming the second international anarchist detachment to volunteer.

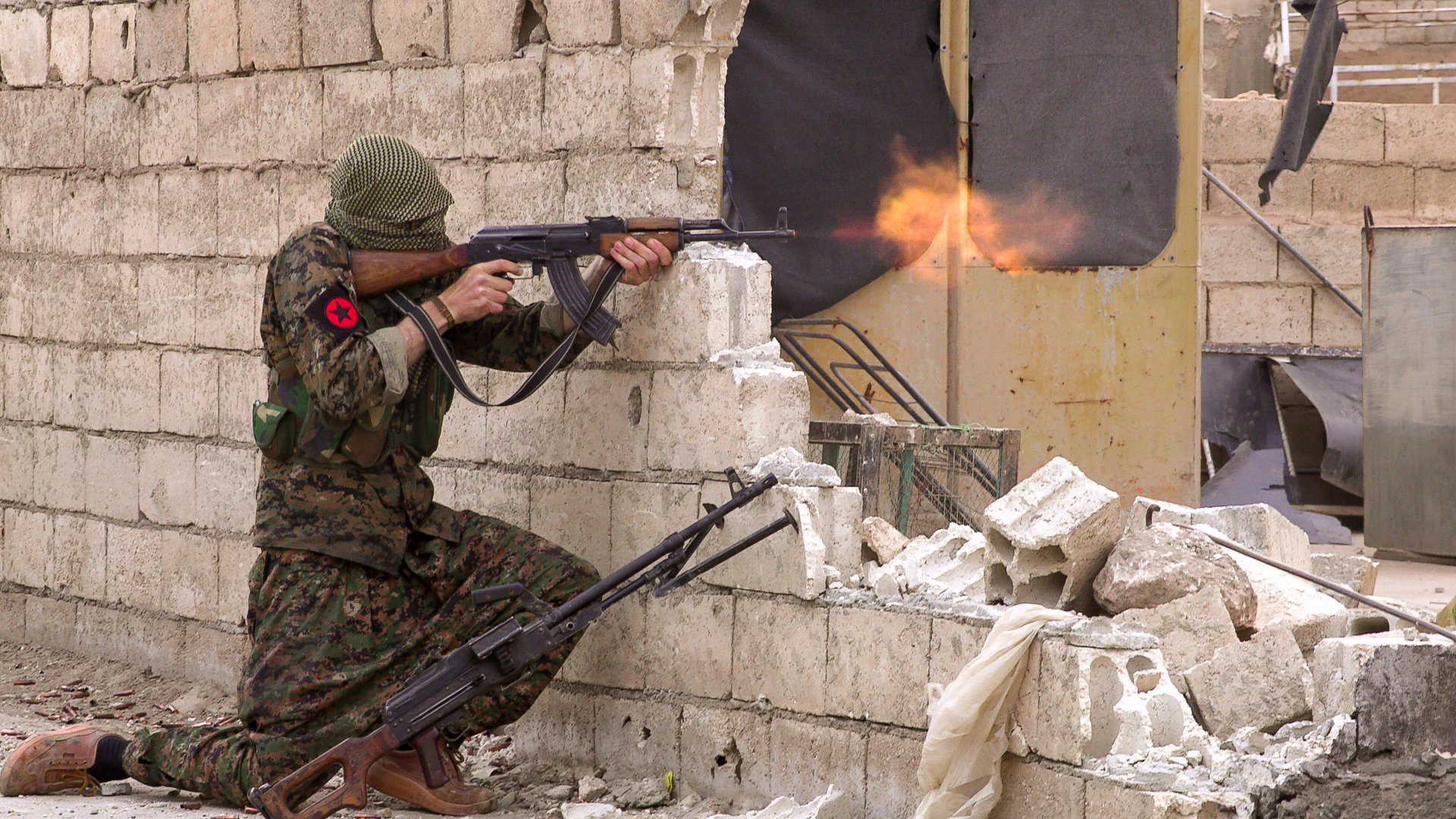
A member of the IRPGF fighting during the Battle of Tabqa.

During the Raqqa campaign, the RUIS and IRPGF were among the participants on the side of the Syrian Democratic Forces, while some anarchist volunteers were integrated directly into the YPG itself. During the campaign, anarchist detachments fought in the Battle of Tabqa and the Battle of Raqqa, playing a role in the SDF victory on the Raqqa front. After the capture of Raqqa, the IRPGF announced the formation of The Queer Insurrection and Liberation Army (TQILA), a queer anarchist detachment formed in order to combat the persecution of LGBT people by ISIL. The Anarchist Struggle (TA) was also established around this time, becoming the fourth international anarchist detachment to be integrated into the IFB.

At the beginning of 2018, the Turkish Armed Forces (TAF) and the Syrian National Army (SNA) launched an invasion of Efrin. Anarchist detachments including RUIS and TA were among the internationalists that attempted to defend the canton. On February 24, the Icelandic anarchist Haukur Hilmarsson, was killed while fighting as part of RUIS. On March 4, the Turkish anarchist Şevger Ara Makhno was killed, while fighting as part of TA, and British anarchist Anna Campbell was killed on the 16th. Despite the resistance, on March 18, the Turkish-led forces captured Afrin city and pacified the remainder of Afrin District over the subsequent week.

TA was subsequently transferred to fight in the resumed Deir ez-Zor campaign, in an operation to capture what remained of ISIL's dwindling territories along the Euphrates. On March 18, 2019, during the Battle of Baghuz Fawqani, the Italian anarchist Lorenzo Orsetti was killed in an ambush, while fighting as part of TA.

== See also ==
- Category:Syrian anarchists
- List of anarchist movements by region
- Anarchism in Israel
- Anarchism in Turkey

== Bibliography ==
- Yassin-Kassab, Robin; Al-Shami, Leila (2018). Burning Country: Syrians in Revolution and War. London: Pluto Press. ISBN 9780745337821. OCLC 1137130901.
- Knapp, Michael; Flach, Anja; Ayboğa, Ercan (2016). Revolution in Rojava: Democratic Autonomy and Women's Liberation in Syrian Kurdistan. Translated by Janet Biehl. Pluto Press. ISBN 9781783719877. OCLC 961001324.
