= International Freedom Battalion =

Revolutionary pro-Kurdish armed group

- Tabûra Azadî ya Înternasyonal
- Dates active: 10 June 2015 – present
- Group: See groups
- Active regions: Rojava, Syria
- Ideology: Revolutionary socialism Proletarian internationalism Anti-fascism; Factions: Anarchism; Marxism–Leninism; Maoism; Hoxhaism
- Political position: Far-left
- Status: Active
- Wars: Rojava conflict, Syrian Civil War and Syrian conflict (2024–present)

The International Freedom Battalion (Turkish: Enternasyonalist Özgürlük Taburu; Kurdish: Tabûra Azadî ya Înternasyonal; Arabic: طابور الحرية العالمي), commonly abbreviated as IFB or EÖT, is a revolutionary socialist armed group consisting of leftist foreign fighters fighting for the People's Defense Units in the Syrian Civil War in support of the Rojava Revolution and against the Turkish Armed Forces, the Syrian National Army, and Islamic State. The formation of the IFB was announced in June 2015 in Ras al-Ayn. Inspiration for the group came from the International Brigades of the Spanish Civil War. The political ideologies of the fighters include anarchism, Marxism–Leninism, Hoxhaism, Maoism, and anarcho-communism.

== Main groups ==
The International Freedom Battalion was formed by left-wing armed groups (as well as individuals not part of any other groups), most of whom had been fighting with the YPG before the creation of the IFB. These groups include:

=== Birleşik Özgürlük Güçleri ===
The United Freedom Forces (Turkish: Birleşik Özgürlük Güçleri, or BÖG), inspired by the International Brigades of the Spanish Civil War, were founded in December 2014 in the town of Kobanî as an organization of foreign leftist fighters of both revolutionary socialist and anarchist convictions. While the MLKP didn't join, these groups would eventually unite in the International Freedom Battalion. BÖG also has a female branch named "Women's Freedom Forces" (Kadın Özgürlük Gücü in Turkish). BÖG is considered to be the largest group within the International Freedom Battalion. BOG contains several factions, see Member groups

=== Marksist-Leninist Komünist Partisi ===
The Marxist–Leninist Communist Party (Turkish: Marksist-Leninist Komünist Partisi, abbreviated as MLKP) is an underground Hoxhaist communist party from Turkey. MLKP fighters had reportedly been sent to Syria to fight with the People's Defense Units since 2012. MLKP fighters also joined the Kurdistan Workers' Party's (PKK) December 2014 Sinjar offensive in Northern Iraq in defence of the Yezidi minority in Sinjar. In March 2015 a 19-year-old German woman, Ivana Hoffmann, was killed whilst fighting the Islamic State (IS) during the Eastern al-Hasakah offensive, making her the third foreign fighter, as well as the first female foreign fighter, to die while fighting alongside the YPG. MLKP's female organisation, Komünist Kadın Örgütü, has also been involved in fighting. MLKP was heavily involved in forming the International Freedom Battalion.

=== TKP/ML TİKKO ===
The Liberation Army of the Workers and Peasants of Turkey (Turkish: Türkiye İşci ve Köylü Kurtuluş Ordusu, abbreviated as TİKKO) is the armed wing of the Communist Party of Turkey/Marxist–Leninist (Turkish: Türkiye Komünist Partisi/Marksist-Leninist, abbreviated as TKP/ML), a Maoist insurgent organisation in Turkey. On 25 March 2016, the TKP/ML TİKKO headquarters in Serêkaniyê were targeted by a motorcycle bomb, causing slight injuries to two members and damage to the headquarters. Two suspects were detained by the Asayiş.

=== Türkiye Komünist Emek Partisi/Leninist ===
The Communist Labour Party of Turkey/Leninist (Turkish: Türkiye Komünist Emek Partisi/Leninist, abbreviated as TKEP/L) is an illegal Marxist–Leninist party in Turkey.

=== Sosyal İsyan ===
Social Insurrection was founded in 2013 in Turkey by a group of green anarchists in Tuzluçayır.

=== Reconstrucción Comunista ===
Flag of RC

Communist Reconstruction (Spanish: Reconstrucción Comunista, abbreviated as RC) is a Marxist–Leninist group from Spain. The group carries a variant of the Flag of the Second Spanish Republic. RC has strong ties to the MLKP and members fight as part of MLKP formations, even fighting in Sinjar. Two members of the group were arrested by police after their return to Spain and were accused of participating in an armed conflict outside of Spain without authorization from the state, as well as putting national interests at risk and joining groups fighting against ISIL that are considered terrorist organizations by international organizations. In January 2016, eight Spanish citizens and one Turkish citizen were arrested in Spain. The Spanish Interior Ministry said in a statement that "The detained, in collaboration with other individuals residing in various European countries, were providing the necessary infrastructure for displaced people to travel abroad and to finally integrate in the ranks of the Peoples' Protection Units (YPG) or one of the armed wings of the organization" and that the majority of the arrested belong to the group 'Communist Reconstruction'. According to 'Communist Reconstruction' leader and founder, Roberto Vaquero, the group remains absent of the Rojava conflict.

=== Revolutionary Union for Internationalist Solidarity ===
The Revolutionary Union for Internationalist Solidarity (Greek: Επαναστατικός Σύνδεσμος Διεθνιστικής Αλληλεγγύης, abbreviated as ΕΣΔΑ) is an armed fighter group from Greece. They have fought in Syria since 2015. Their appearance has alarmed Greek security and intelligence officials alleging that "warriors will be trained in guerilla warfare and then will be able to apply what they have learned in their homeland".

=== Bob Crow Brigade ===
Flag of the Bob Crow Brigade

The Bob Crow Brigade (abbreviated as BCB) is a group of fighters from the United Kingdom and Ireland named after Bob Crow, an English trade union leader and self-described "communist/socialist", who had died of a heart attack in March 2014. The group expressed solidarity with striking rail workers in the United Kingdom. Steve Hedley, senior assistant general secretary of the RMT, said: "Bob would have been honoured that young people from Britain would fight the forces of evil in his name. A great admirer of the international brigades that fought in Spain, Crow would of course have drawn the parallels with the new international brigades fighting clerical fascism and defending Yazidi, Muslim and Christian workers from slavery and persecution."

After Turkey and its allied rebel groups invaded parts of northern Syria and clashed with the Syrian Democratic Forces, Turkish officials stated that they will treat British and other foreign volunteers fighting alongside the YPG as terrorists. On 2 September, the Bob Crow Brigade relocated from the Raqqa front to Manbij and stated "When we came to defend the revolution we meant from all enemies, big or small". On 7 September 2016, the Bob Crow Brigade sent a message of solidarity to the women of Ireland fighting to repeal the Eighth Amendment of the Constitution of Ireland on the 33rd anniversary of its approval by referendum, as well as striking Irish bus workers the following day.

=== Henri Krasucki Brigade ===
The flag of the Henri Krasucki Brigade

The Henri Krasucki Brigade (French: Brigade Henri Krasucki) is a group of fighters from France. Inspired by their English-speaking counterparts of the Bob Crow Brigade, they named themselves after the French trade-unionist Henri Krasucki. The group expressed solidarity with the CGT union and the Air France workers on trial for the "shirt-ripping case" over an incident on 5 October 2015, which arose from a dispute over the aviation giant's plans to cut 2,900 jobs.

=== International Revolutionary People's Guerrilla Forces ===
The flag of the IRPGF

The International Revolutionary People's Guerrilla Forces (abbreviated as IRPGF) was a militant, armed, self-organized, and horizontal collective of foreign anarchist fighters from around the world. The formation of the IRPGF was announced on 31 March 2017 in a video and text release to several revolutionary websites and media organizations. According to the declaration of the group, their goals were to defend the social revolution in Rojava and spread anarchism.

They were a member organization and part of the management team of the International Freedom Battalion since April 2017; this was announced by the IFB on their Facebook page on 17 May. Their public formation and solidarity campaigns garnered interest and support from around the world as well as backlash. On 24 July, the group established an LGBT unit, the TQILA. On 24 September 2018, the group announced its dissolution in a final communique.

=== Michael Israel Brigade ===
The Michael Israel Brigade formed in early 2018 at the time of the Battle of Afrin as an international volunteer unit. It adopted its name in homage to an American fighter of the International Freedom Battalion, Michael Israel, also known as Robin Agiri, killed by a Turkish bombardment northeast of al-Bab on 24 November 2016, during Operation Euphrates Shield. In its first press release, published on 13 February 2018, the brigade presented itself as a "group of communists, socialists, anarchists and anti-fascists, from all four corners of the world, [...] united in Rojava by the principles of solidarity, internationalism and anti-fascism". The group is made up of far-left foreign volunteers, mainly Turks and Westerners.

The brigade announced that it was going to the front in Afrin on 19 February 2018. However, the Syrian Democratic Forces were severely affected by the artillery and air strikes of the Turkish Army. The Michael Israel Brigade announced its withdrawal from Afrin on 22 March 2018, it recognized the death of at least one of its fighters - a Turkish volunteer named Şevger Ara Makhno, killed on 8 March by an airstrike in the village of Berbêné - as well as several wounded. Some fighters were then sent to eastern Syria to take part in the offensive.

== Structure ==
- United Freedom Forces
  - Women's Freedom Forces
  - Revolutionary Communard Party
  - MLSPB-DC
    - Betül Altindal Taburu
    - Serpil Polat Taburu
  - Social Insurrection
  - Devrimci Cephe
  - Devrimci Karargâh
  - Revolution Party of Turkey
  - Emek ve Özgürlük Cephesi
  - Halkın Devrimci Güçleri
  - PDKÖ
  - Aziz GÜLER Özgürlük Gücü Milis Örgütü
  - Kader Ortakaya Timi
  - Kızılbaş Timi
  - Mahir Arpaçay Devrimci Savaş Okulu
  - Necdet Adalı Müfrezesi
  - Spartaküs Timi
  - Şehit Bedreddin Taburu
- MLKP
  - MLKP/KKÖ
- TKP/ML TİKKO
- MKP
- Reconstrucción Comunista
- TKEP/L
- RUIS
- Bob Crow Brigade
- Henri Krasucki Brigade
- IRPGF
  - TQILA
- Tekoşîna Anarşîst (Anarchist Struggle)

== Gallery ==
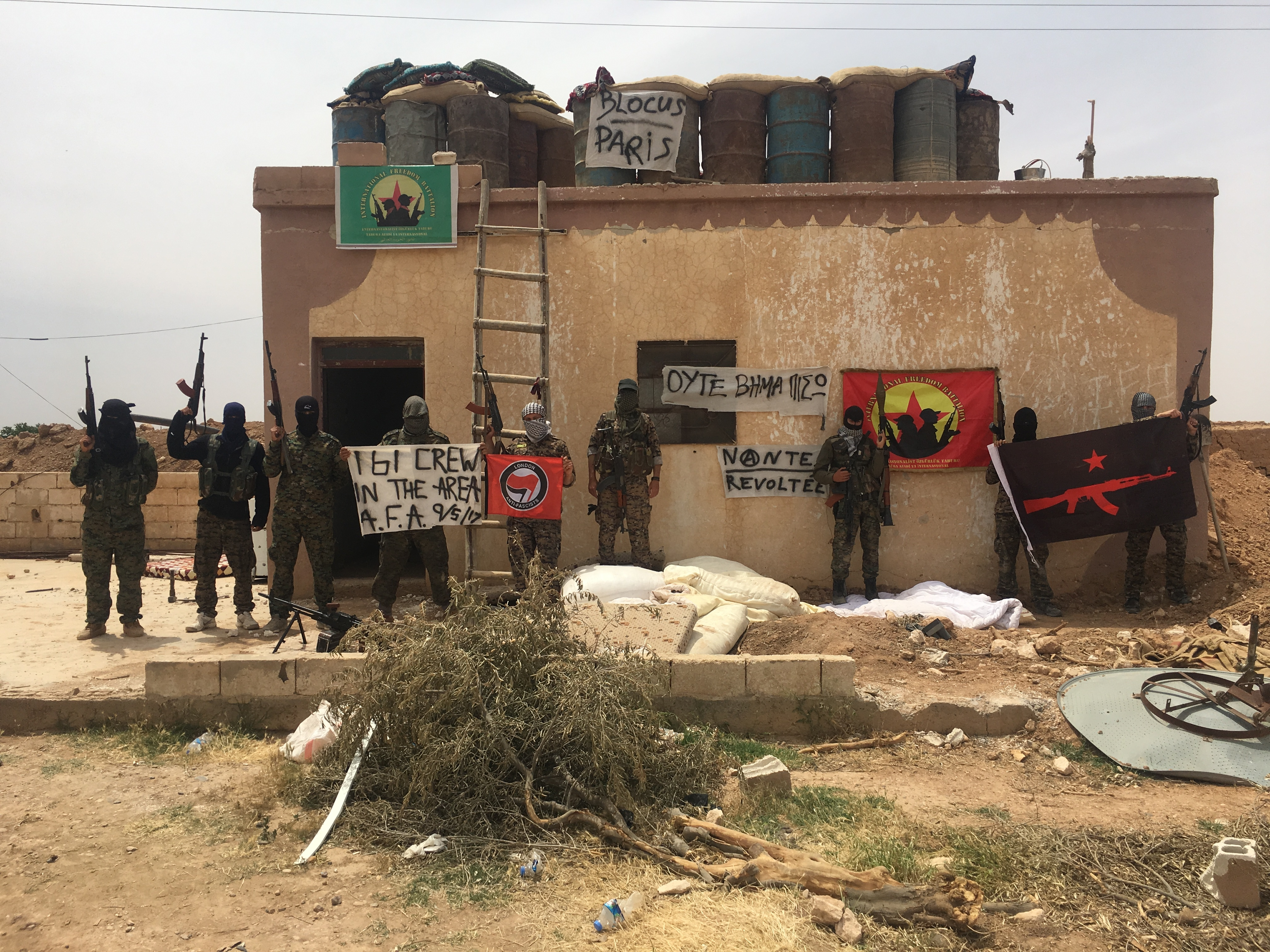
Members of International Freedom Battalion.

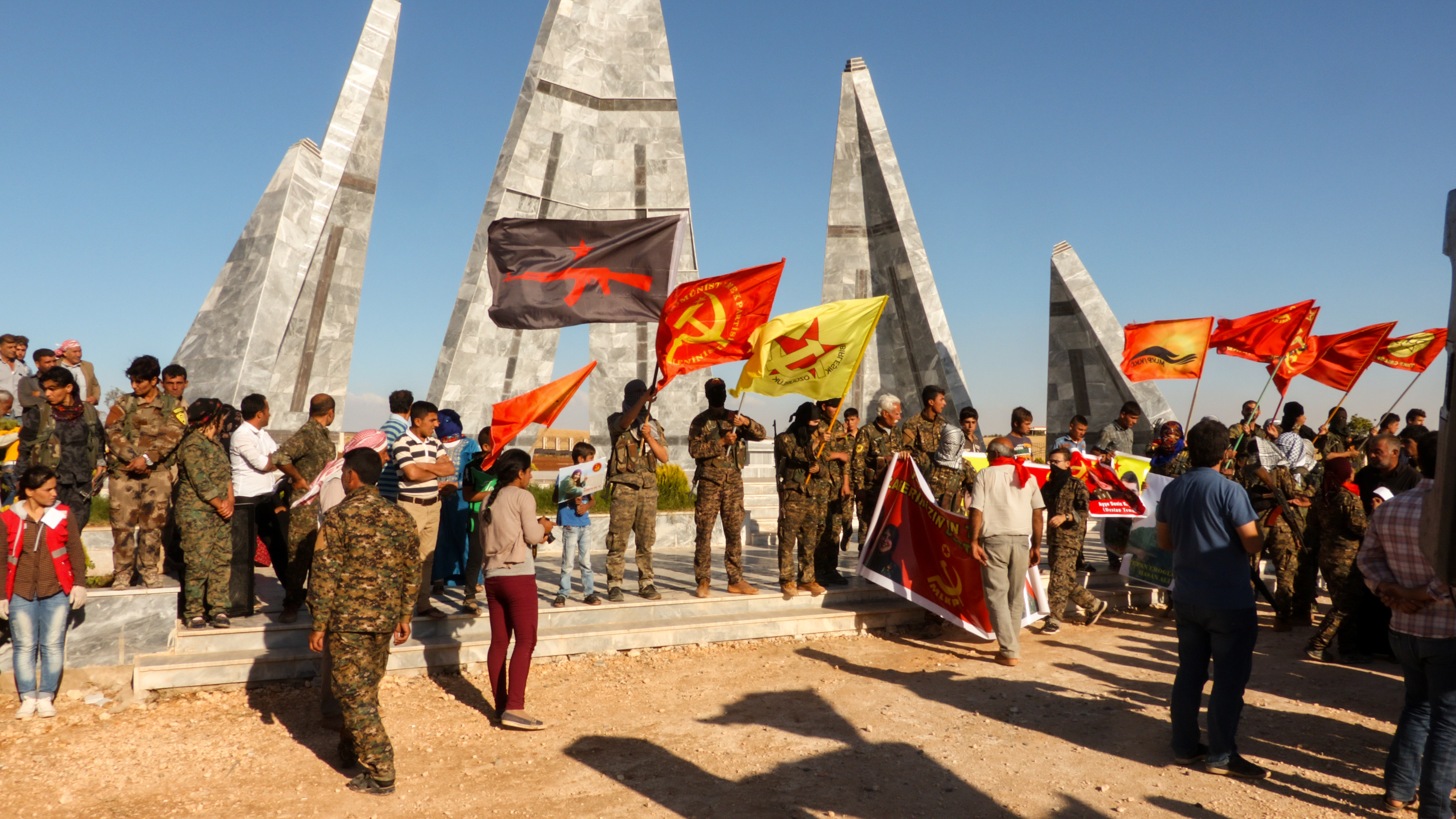
IFB members in the ceremony and burial of Ayşe Deniz Karacagil of MLKP in Kobanê.

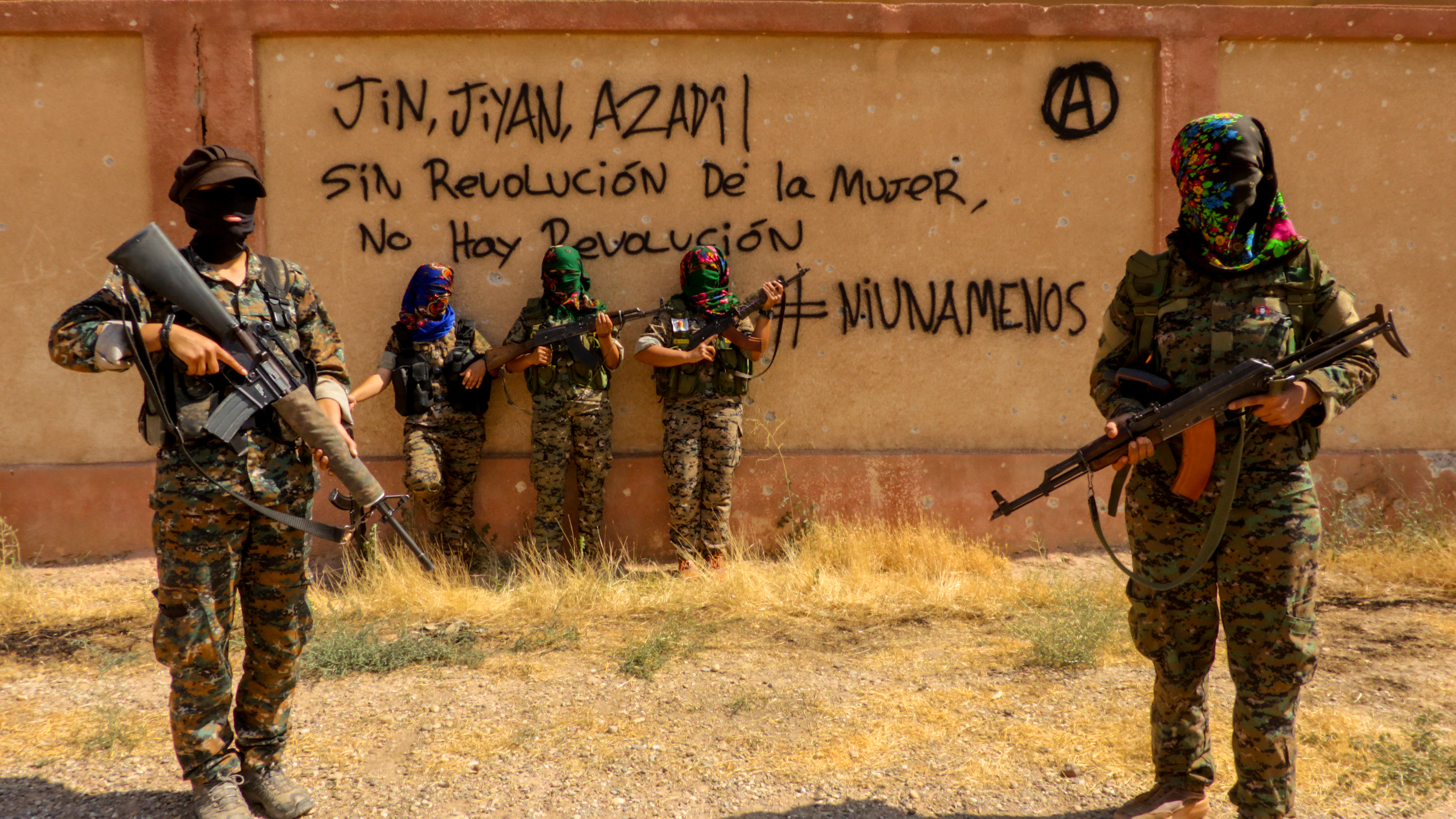
Women of IFB in solidarity with Ni una menos.

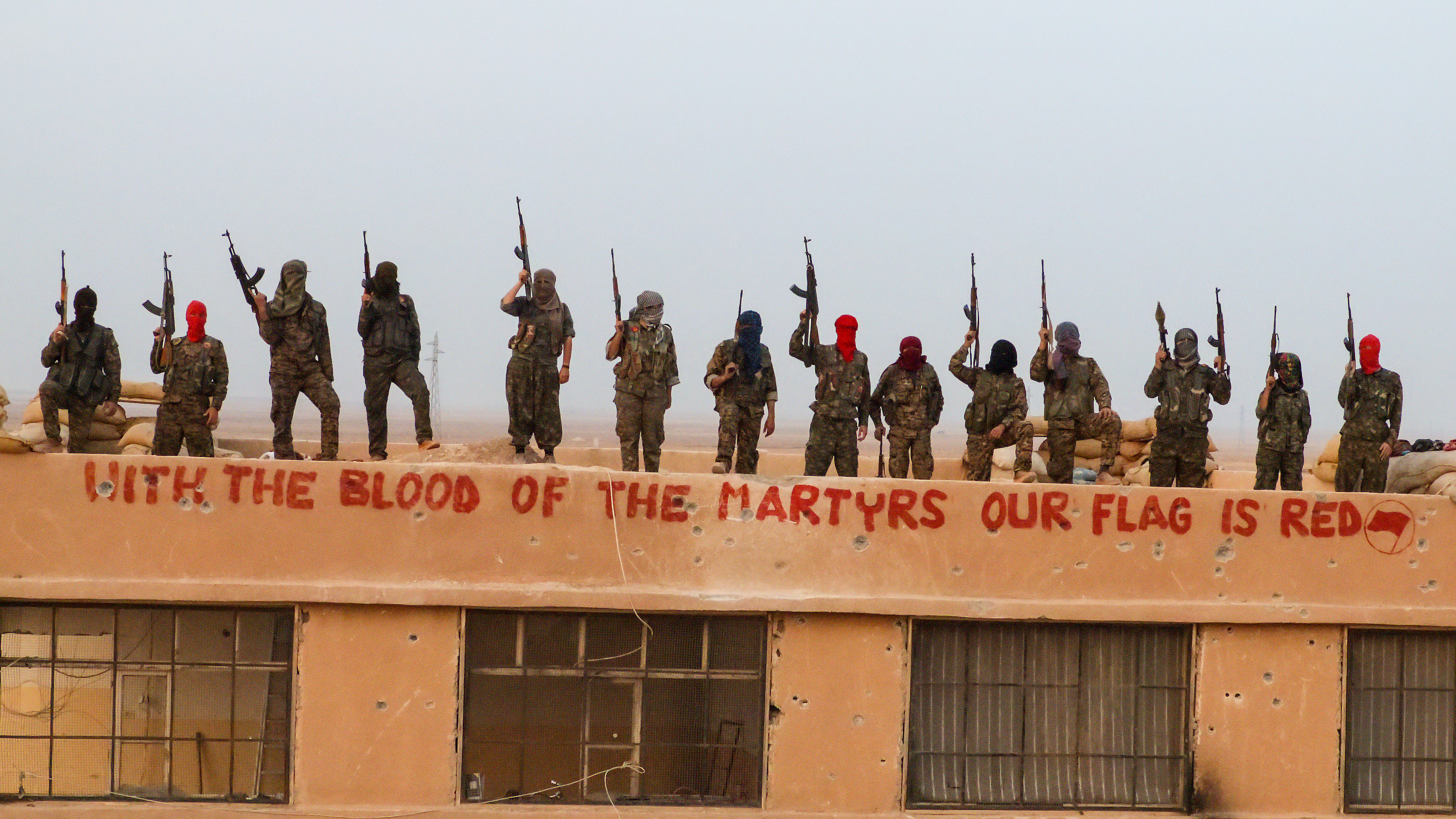
Members of International Freedom Battalion.

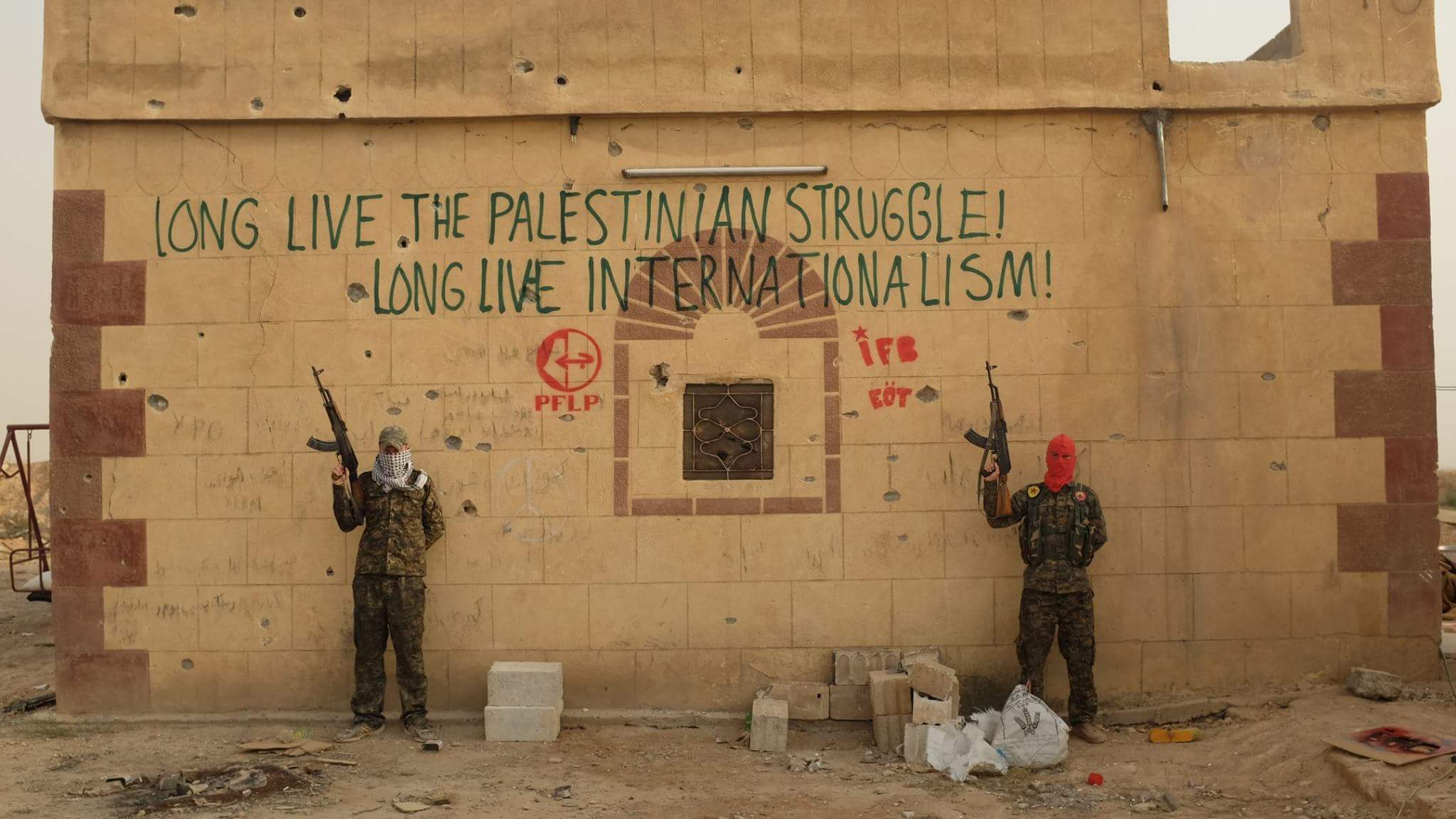
IFB members in solidarity with PFLP.

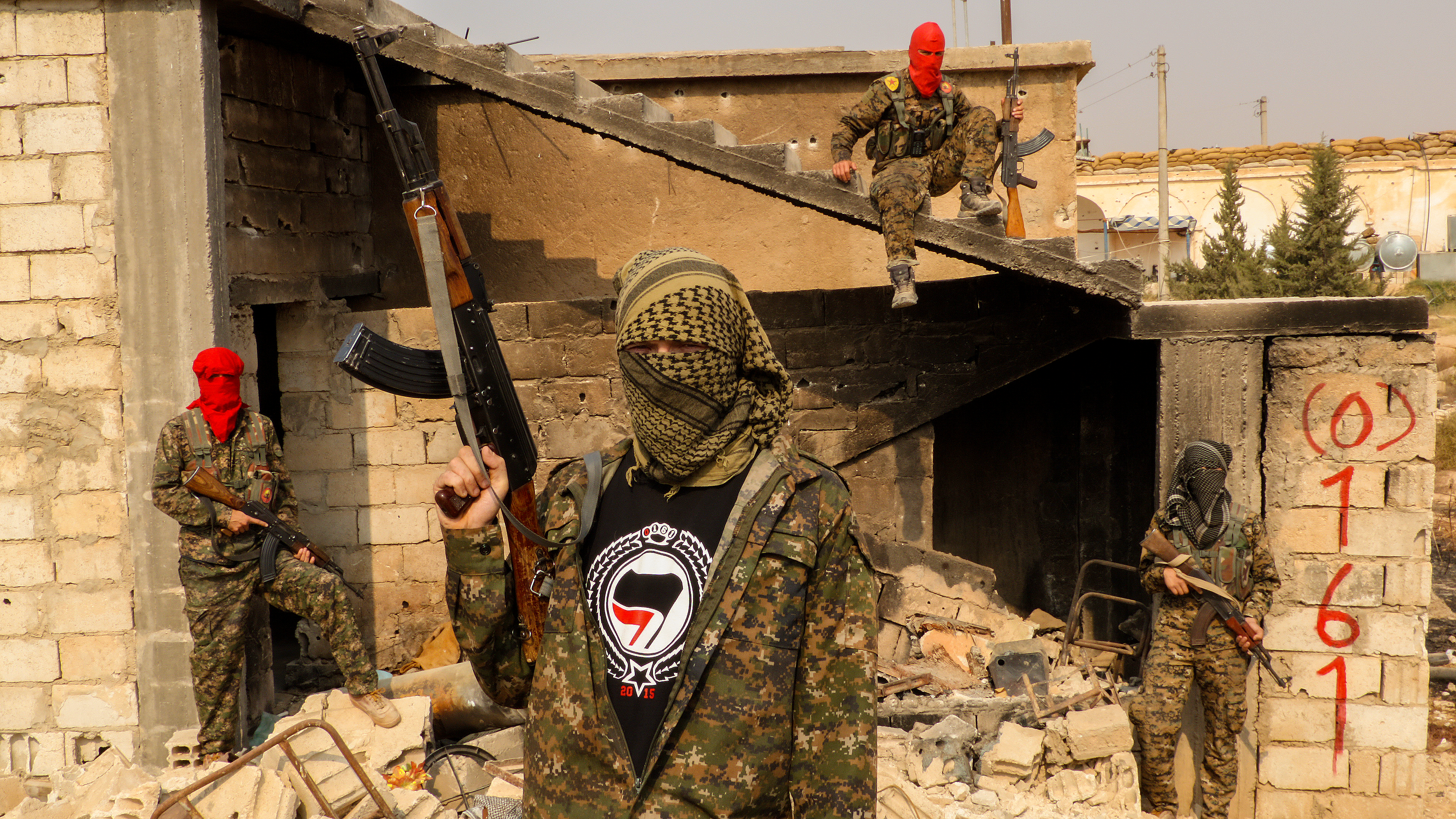
Some members of the Bob Crow Brigade.

== Notable fatalities ==
Date of death	Name	Age	Nationality	Group	Location of death
2 March 2015	Konstandinos Erik Scurfield	25	British, Greek	YPG	Tel Khuzela
7 March 2015	Ivana Hoffmann	19	German	MLKP	near Tell Tamer, Al-Hasakah Governorate
14 August 2017	Nubar Ozanyan	61	Armenian	TKP/ML	Raqqa, Raqqa Governorate
24 February 2018	Haukur Hilmarsson	31	Icelandic	YPG, RUIS, MLKP	Afrin district
18 March 2019	Lorenzo Orsetti	33	Italian	TKP/ML (early); TA	Al-Baghuz Fawqani, Deir ez-Zor Governorate

== See also ==
- Anti-Fascist Internationalist Front
- Belligerents in the Syrian civil war
- International Brigades
- International Legion of Territorial Defense of Ukraine
- Peoples' United Revolutionary Movement

== Bibliography ==
- Foreign Volunteers for the Syrian Kurdish Forces (PDF) (Report). Atlanta: Carter Center. 27 February 2017. Archived (PDF) from the original on 24 April 2020.
