= Anarchist Struggle =

Anarchist military unit

- Tekoşîna Anarşîst
- Dates active: August 2017 – present
- Active regions: Autonomous Administration of North and East Syria
- Ideology: Anarchism; Libertarian communism
- Status: Active
- Part of: International Freedom Battalion
- Wars: the Syrian Civil War
- Website: tekosinaanarsist.noblogs.org

Anarchist Struggle (Kurmanji Kurdish: Têkoşîna Anarşîst, abbreviated to TA) is an anarchist auxiliary military unit, composed mainly of international volunteers, who fight for the Syrian Democratic Forces in the Rojava conflict of the Syrian Civil War. It was founded in 2017 and later integrated into the International Freedom Battalion.

== History ==
Although Tekoşîna Anarşîst was active since August 2017, the unit did not publicly announce its existence until January 10, 2019, when it released an official statement, quickly picked up by websites such as It's Going Down, Enough is Enough and Voices in Movement.

=== Battle of Afrin ===
At the beginning of 2018, in the face of Turkey's invasion of the Afrin canton, a unit of international volunteers called the Anti-Fascist Forces in Afrin (AFFA) was formed, and the members of TA were integrated into it. The group participated in the Battle of Afrin in early 2018 against the Turkish Army and the Free Syrian Army. In the battle, dozens of international volunteers lost their lives in combat. One of them was Şevger Ara Makhno, nom de guerre of a young militant Turkish anarchist. The identity of the young man was not disclosed to protect his family due to the repressive political environment in Turkey.

=== Deir ez-Zor offensive ===
After the Battle of Afrin, the group mobilized to the town of Al-Baghuz Fawqani to carry out medical assistance tasks for the fighters and mobilize volunteers to fight against the last stronghold of the Islamic State in Syria. On March 18, 2019, an ISIS-related media announced on a Telegram channel the death of Lorenzo Orsetti, a 33-year-old anarchist from Florence, in an ambush during the Battle of Baghuz. His death was then confirmed by the YPG. The news shocked public opinion in Italy, the young anarchist was classified as a "hero" by various media and personalities in Italy, while others stood out to criticize the "Italian hypocrisy" in front of international volunteers who join the Kurds and upon returning to Italy are prosecuted. Lorenzo was praised by various anarchist and leftist organizations and media, including the Federazione Anarchica Italiana.

== See also ==
- Anarchism in Syria
- International Revolutionary People's Guerrilla Forces
- Revolutionary Union for Internationalist Solidarity
