= International Revolutionary People's Guerrilla Forces =

International leftist guerilla forces in Syria

- Emblem of the IRPGF
- Leader: None (anarchy organisation)
- Dates active: 31 March 2017 – 24 September 2018
- Groups: The Queer Insurrection and Liberation Army
- Active regions: Rojava
- Ideology: Anarcho-communism; Queer anarchism
- Political position: Far-left
- Status: Inactive
- Size: Unknown
- Part of: International Freedom Battalion
- Wars: Rojava conflict and the Syrian Civil War

The International Revolutionary People's Guerrilla Forces (IRPGF) was a collective of anarchist fighters from around the world. Its formation was announced on 31 March 2017. According to the group, their goals were to defend the social revolution in Rojava in northern Syria, and to spread anarchism. The group announced its dissolution on 24 September 2018, citing a change in "perspective on strategy of armed struggle".

The IRPGF had been part of the International Freedom Battalion since April 2017. Turkish media described them as a terrorist organization and part of the network of the outlawed Kurdistan Workers' Party.

== Affiliation ==
The group was a part of the International Freedom Battalion from April 2017, and they were the second anarchist group to join after the Greek unit RUIS. They participated frequently in the campaign activities of the brigade in social networks.

On 29 May, the IRPGF issued a statement in tribute to the commander of the United Freedom Forces Mehmet Kurnaz (Ulaş Bayraktaroglu), who was killed in combat on the Raqqa Front while fighting the Islamic State of Iraq and the Levant. They defined him as a true friend of the IRPGF. On the 31st of the same month, the IRPGF sent representatives and speakers to the City of Derek (Canton of Cizîrê) at the funeral ceremony to four martyrs of the International Freedom Battalion and the People's Protection Units, Mehmet Kurnaz (Ulaş Bayraktaroglu), Muzaffer Kandemir (fighter) of the United Freedom Forces, Elî Mihemed Mizil (Şêr Zagros), and Nimet Tûrûg (Baran Cudi) of the People's Protection Units.

== Armed struggle and involvement in the Syrian Civil War ==
Their public presence was confirmed at multiple martyr ceremonies in Rojava over 2017. Having fought along with the three most recent martyrs of the International Freedom Battalion, they were present at the funeral ceremonies for DKP leader and United Freedom Forces (BÖG) commander Ulaş Bayraktaroğlu, Tufan Eroğluer (Hasan Ali) from BÖG and Ayşe Deniz Karacagil (Destan Temmuz) from MLKP.

== The Queer Insurrection and Liberation Army ==
The Queer Insurrection and Liberation Army (TQILA), a queer anarchist subunit of the IRPGF, formed in July 2017, as a group of foreign militia who came to fight alongside the Kurdish People's Defense Units (YPG). Its formation went viral on social media and was widely reported and celebrated in the Western press.

== Criticism ==
An August 2017 Al Jazeera English report by Syrian-Palestinian blogger Razan Ghazzawi cited two queer Syrian activists, who alleged the IRPGF had a lack of accountability, that its ally the Democratic Union Party had not acted against LGBTQ discrimination, and that its anarchist ideology was opposed to peace and stability. Ghazzawi argued the group contributed to a war on terror narrative that enabled the Assad regime.

== Gallery ==
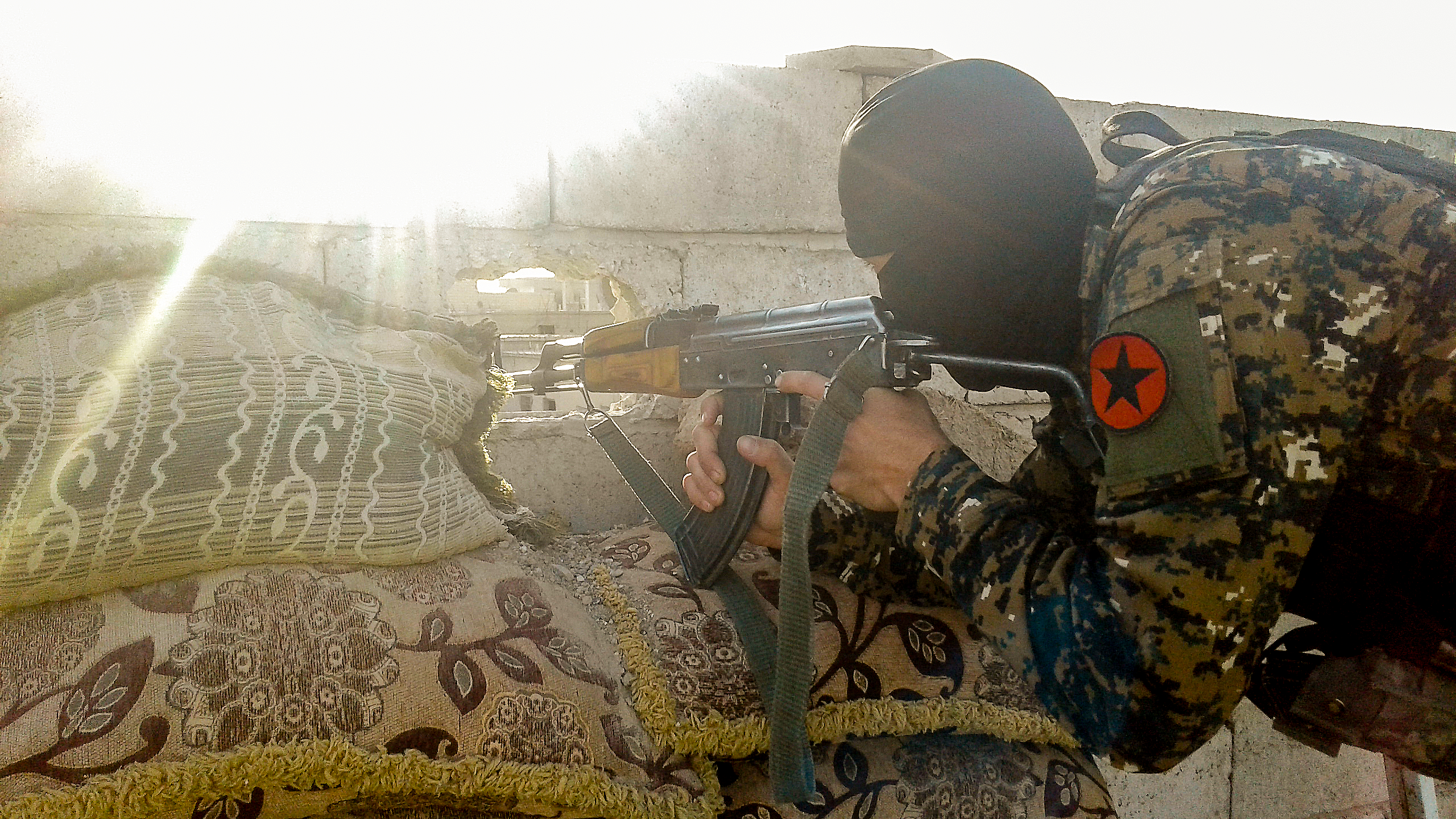
An IRPGF fighter during the Battle of Raqqa in 2017

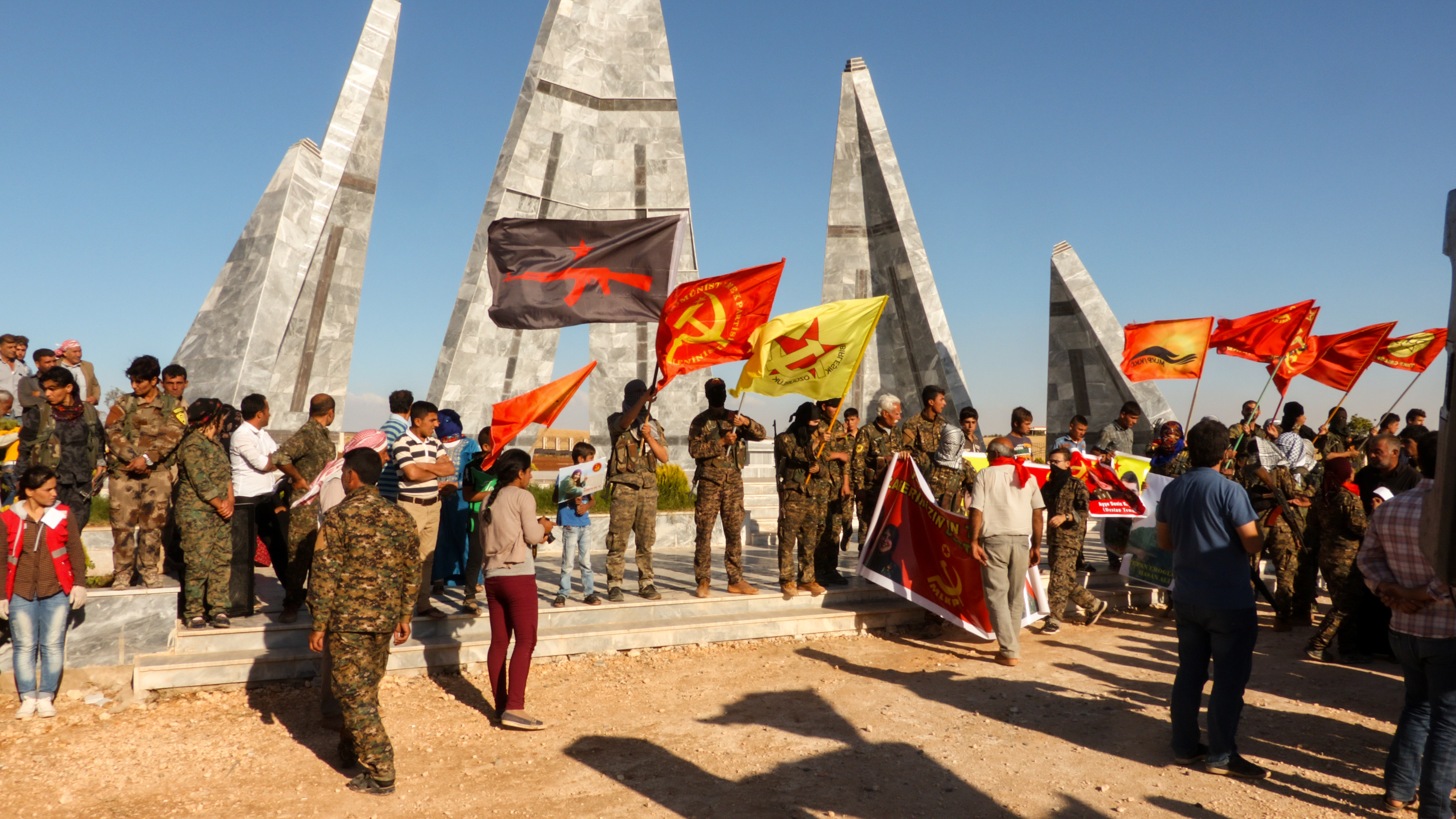
Fighters from the IRPGF and IFB at the burial of Destan Temmuz, an MLKP fighter.

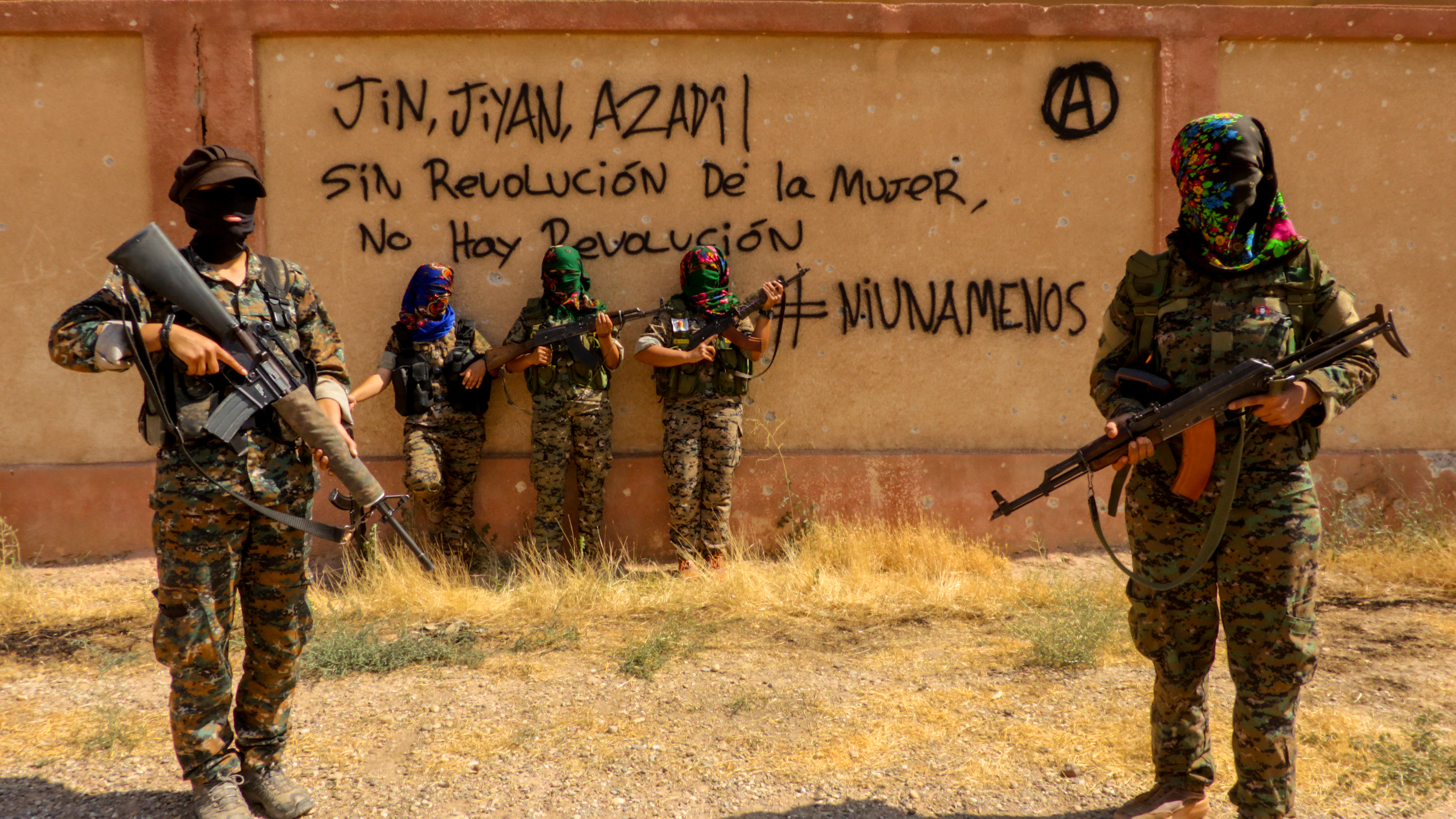
IRPGF fighters displaying solidarity with Ni una menos.

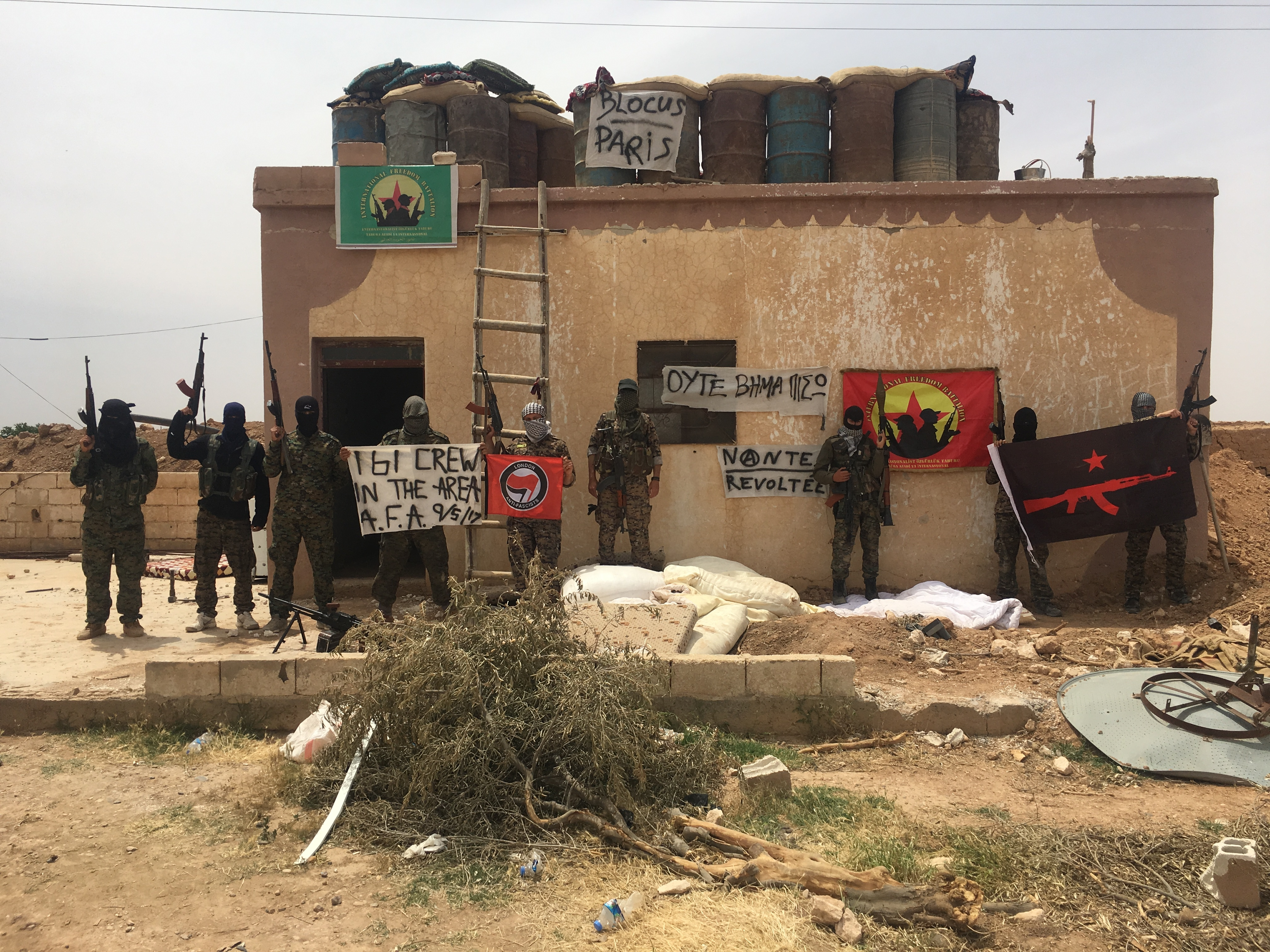
IFB and IRPGF members posing with their flags

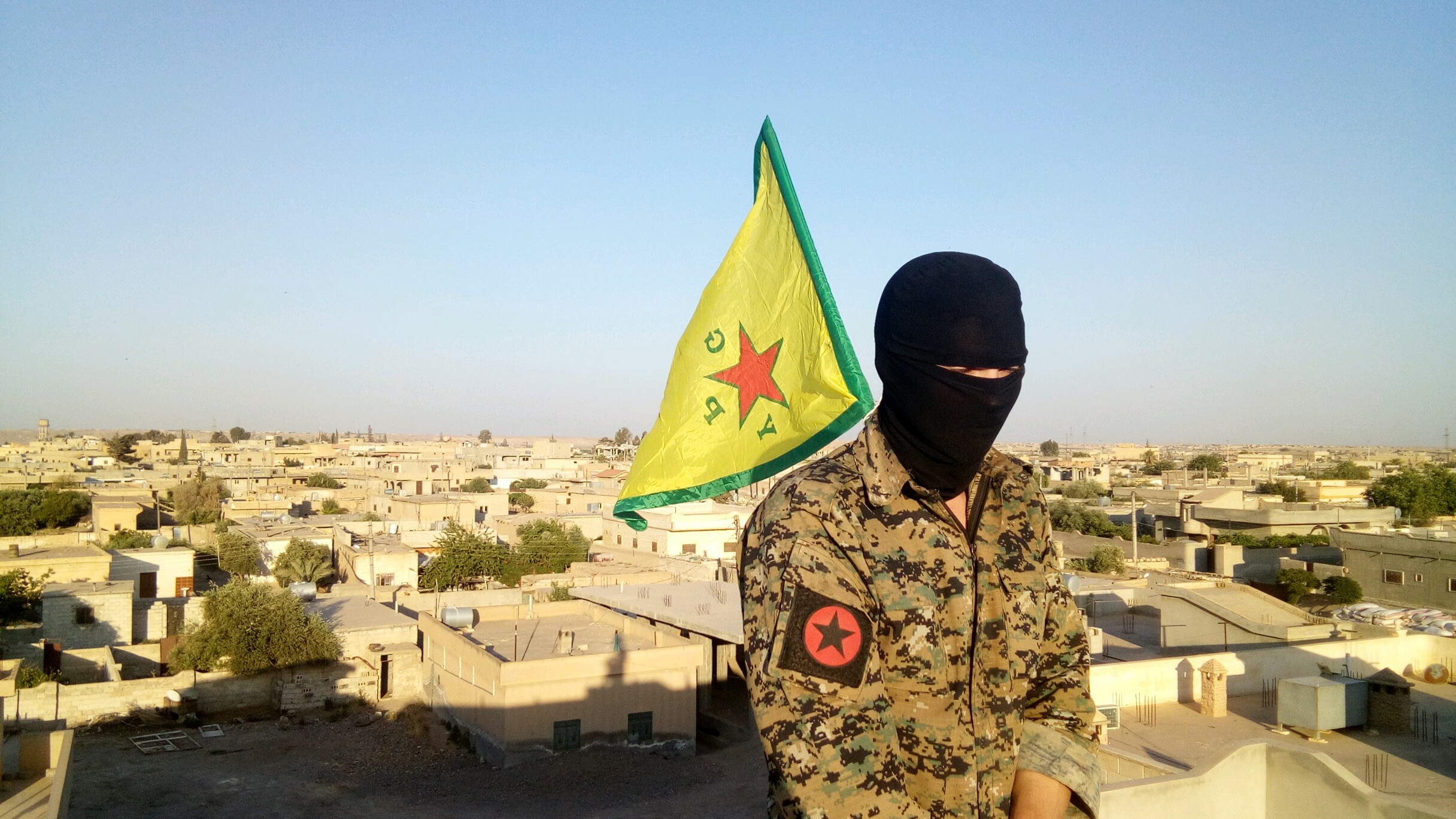
An IRPGF fighter during the Battle of Tabqa

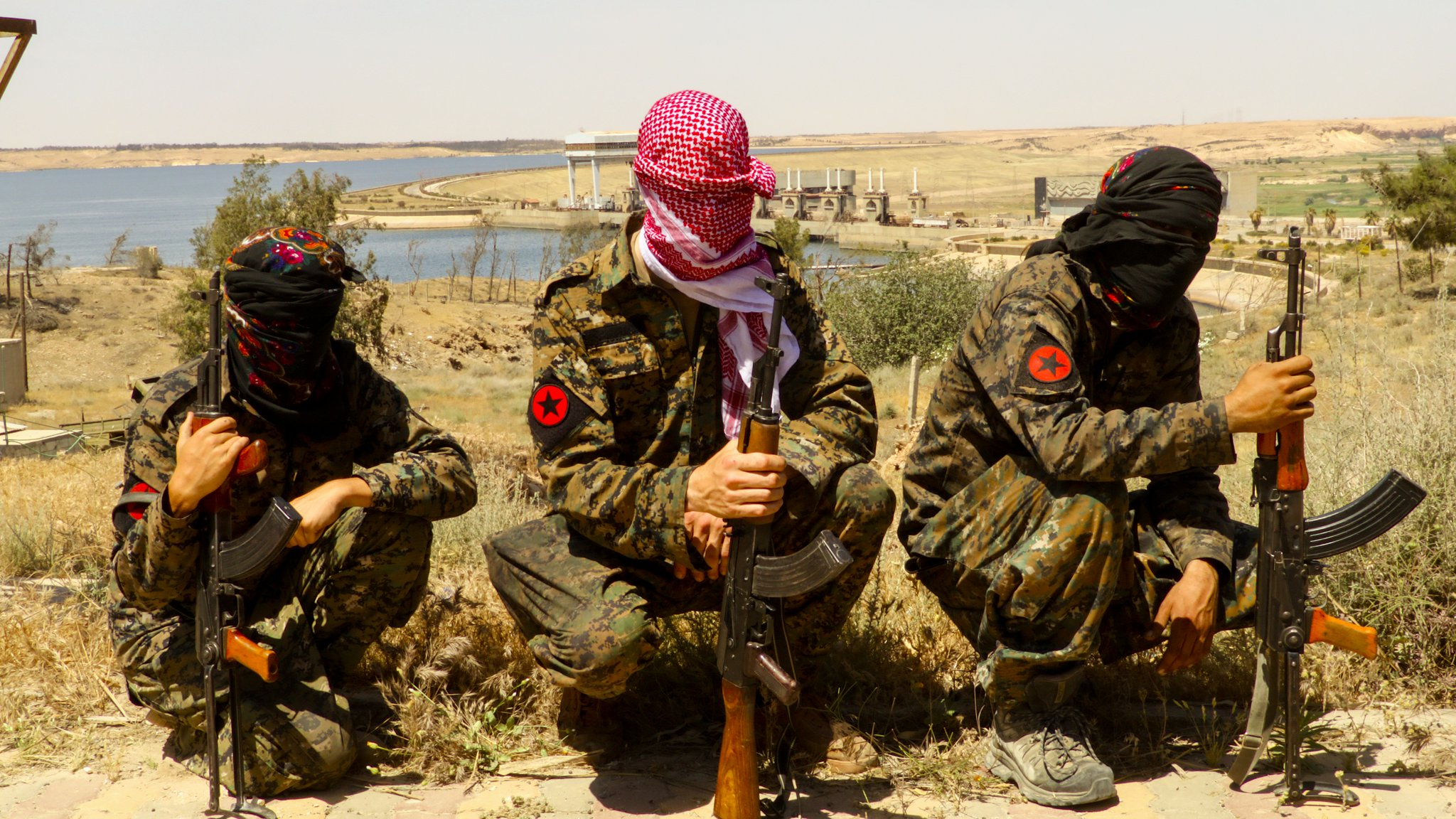
IRPGF fighters resting during the Battle of Tabqa

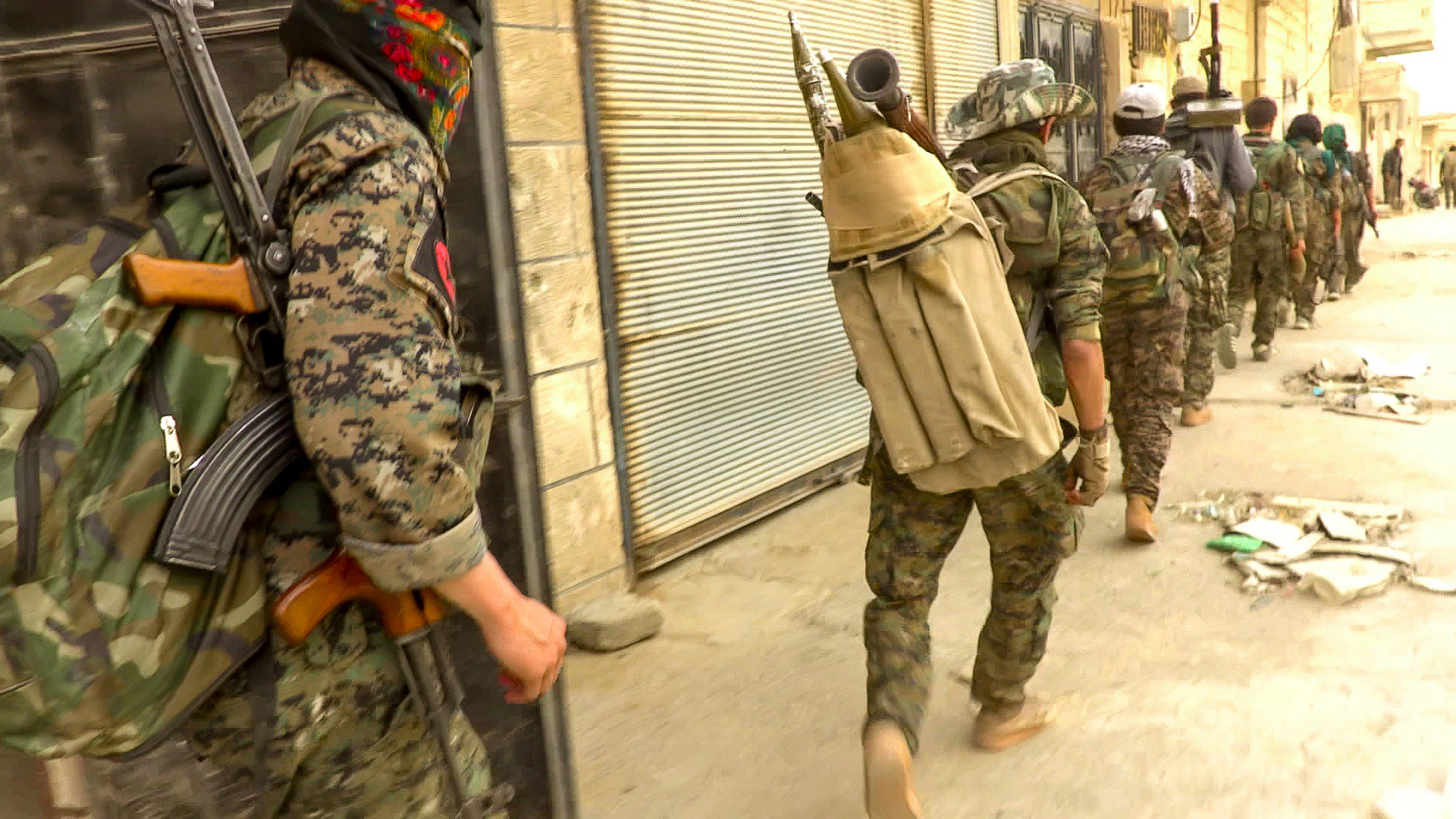
A column of IRPGF fighters during the Battle of Tabqa

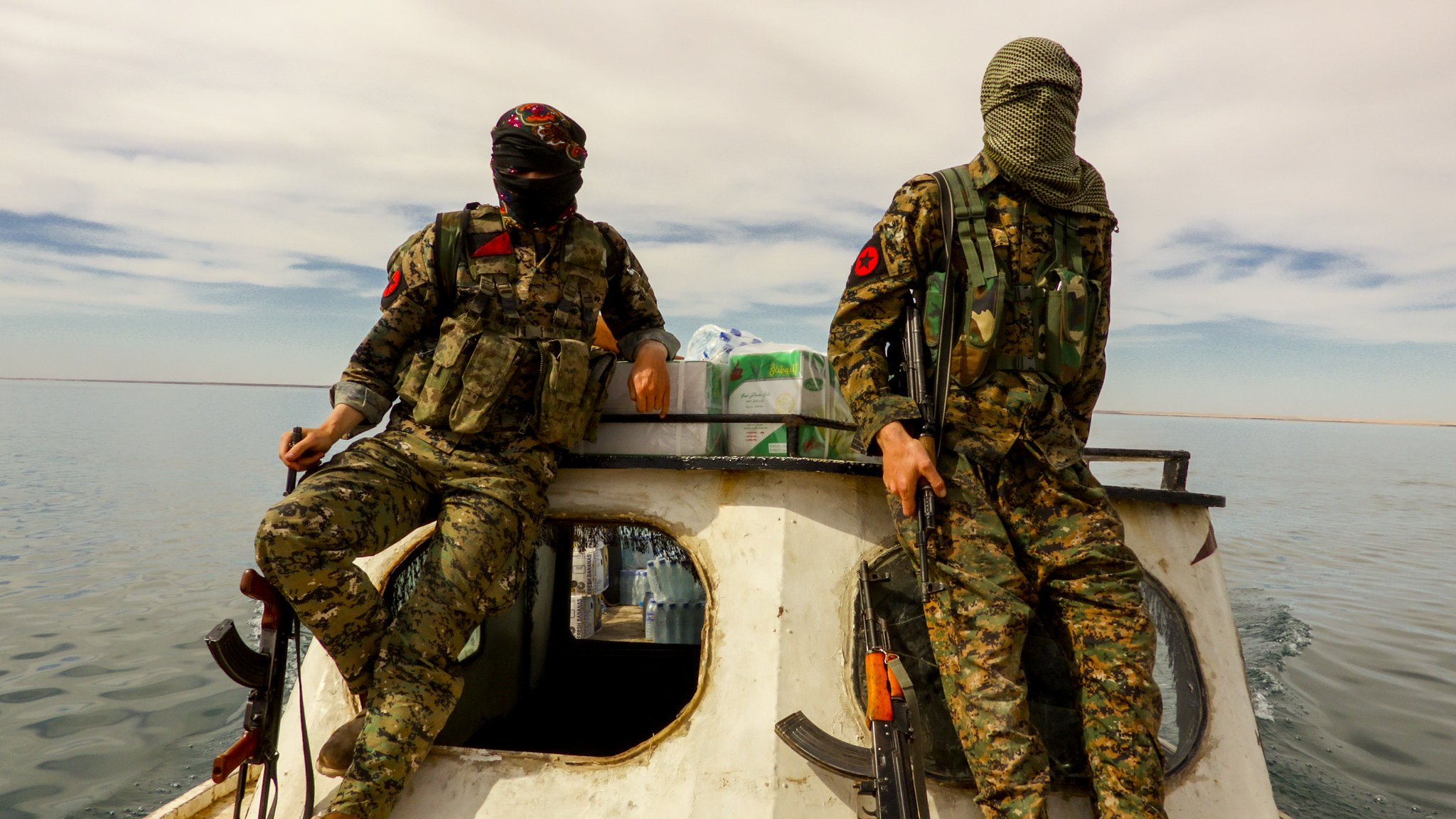
IRPGF fighters crossing Lake Assad by boat

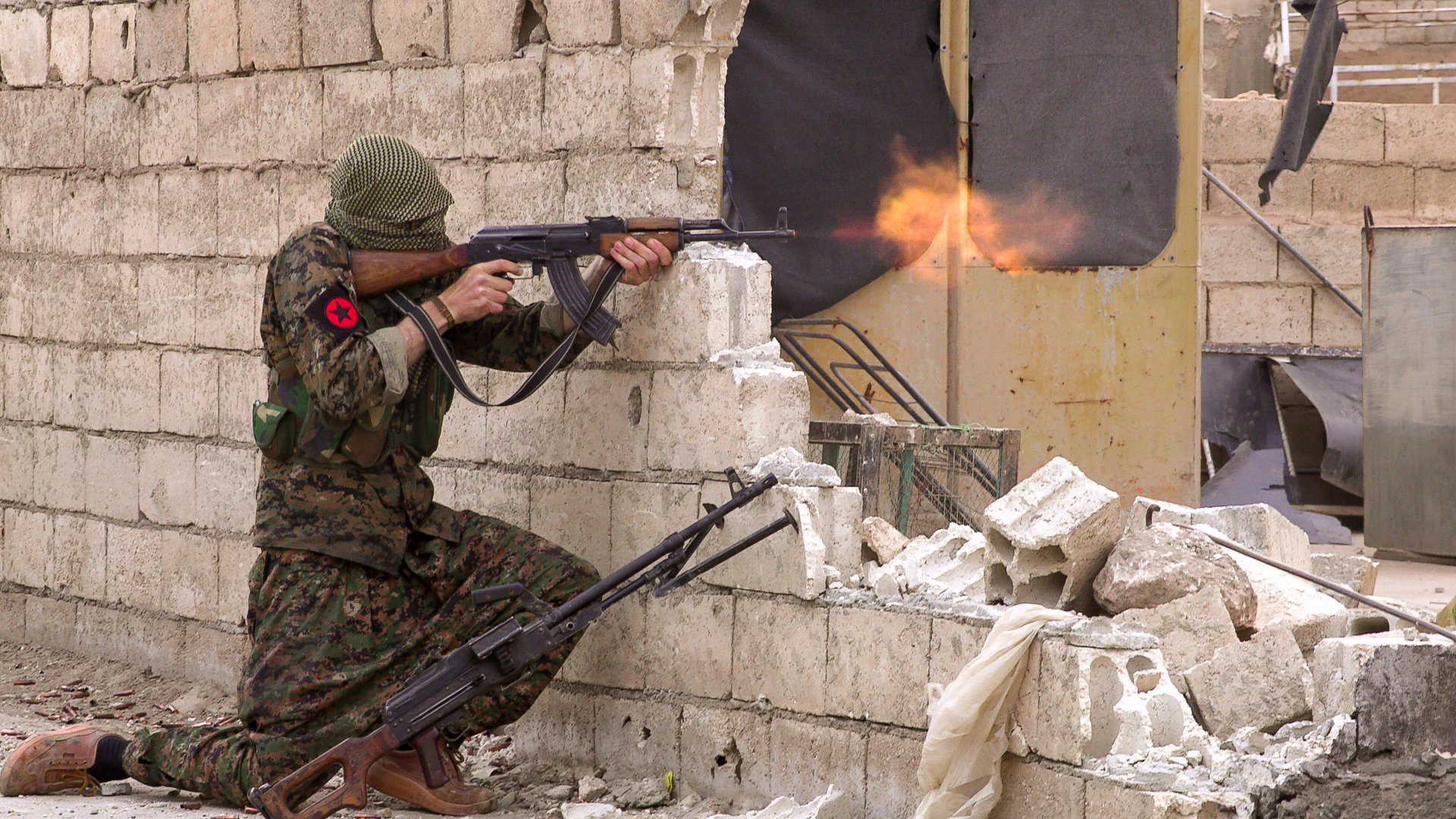
An IRPGF fighter firing at enemy positions in Tabqa

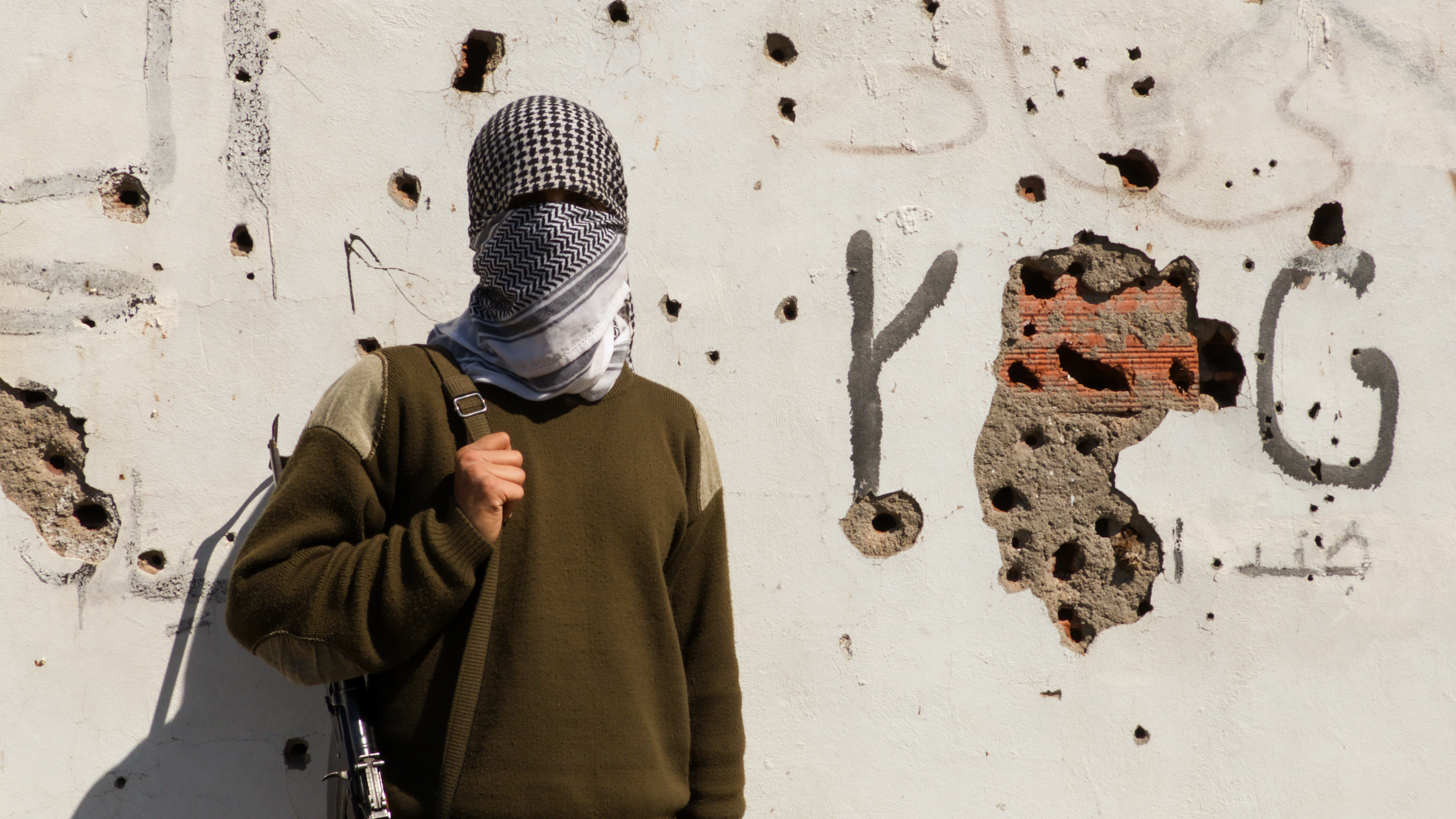
A member of the IRPGF

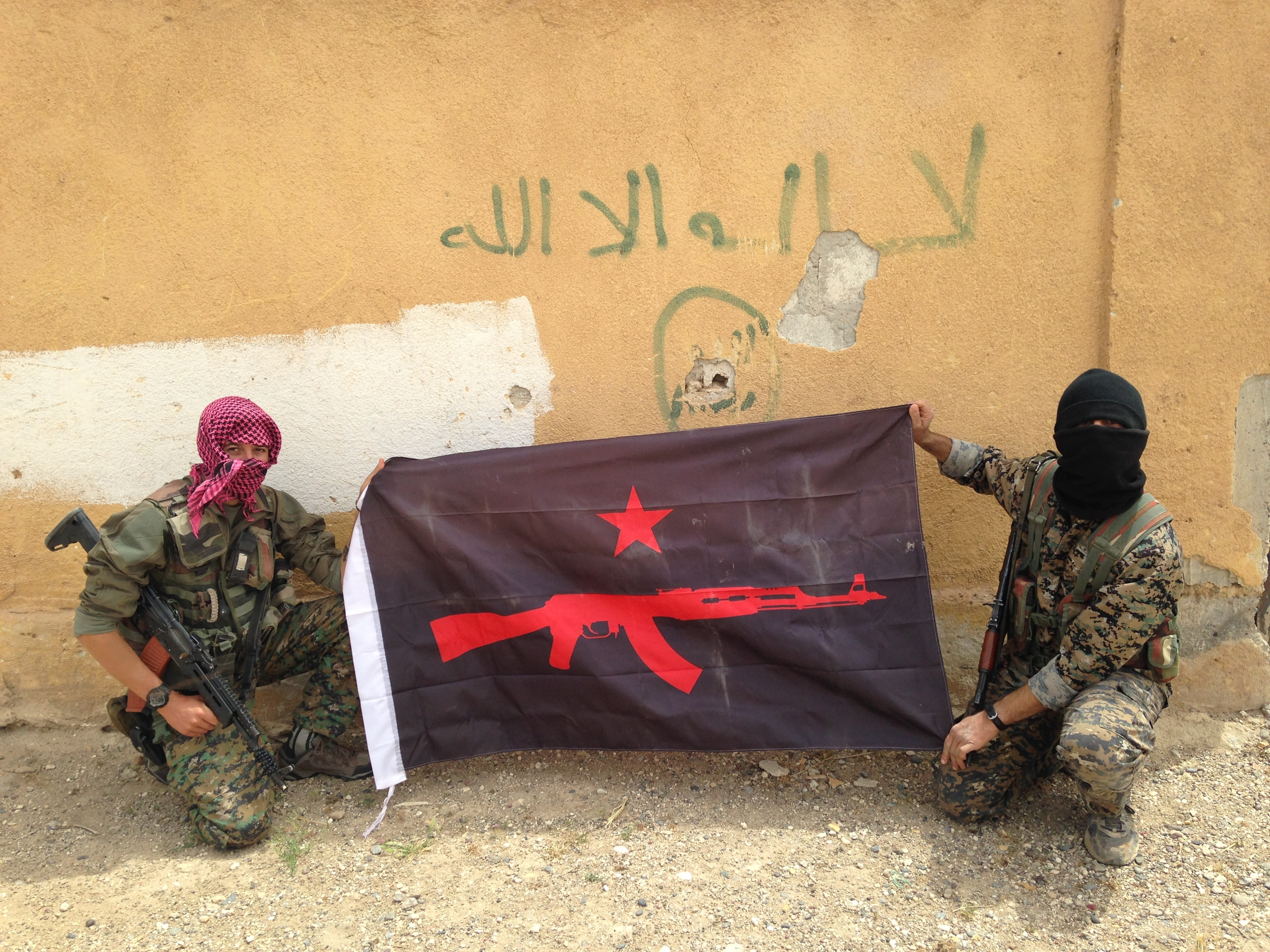
IRPGF fighters displaying the group's flag

== See also ==
- Anarchism in Syria
- International Brigades
- List of armed groups in the Syrian Civil War
- People's Protection Units
- Peoples' United Revolutionary Movement
- List of anarchist organizations
- List of guerrilla movements
- List of active rebel groups
- List of armed groups in the Iraqi Civil War
