= Peoples' United Revolutionary Movement =

Peoples' United Revolutionary Movement Halkların Birleşik Devrim Hareketi
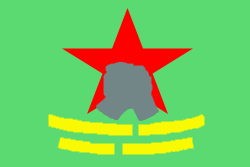
- Abbreviation: HBDH
- Founded: March 12, 2016
- Ideology: Revolutionary socialism; Communism; Marxism–Leninism; Anti-fascism; Libertarian socialism; Anti-capitalism; Apoism
- Political position: Far-left
- Members: List: Communist Labour Party of Turkey/Leninist; Coordination of Revolutionary Proletarians; Maoist Communist Party; Marxist–Leninist Armed Propaganda Unit; Marxist–Leninist Communist Party; Revolutionary Communard Party; Union of Revolutionary Communists of Turkey; Devrimci Karargâh (Merged into Revolutionary Communard Party in 2017); Kurdistan Workers' Party (Until 2025)

Website
- https://www.hbdh-online.org/

The Peoples' United Revolutionary Movement or HBDH (Turkish: Halkların Birleşik Devrim Hareketi) is a far-left self-declared alliance of ten mostly Kurdish leftist, revolutionary socialist, and communist organizations in Turkey. The alliance was declared on March 12, 2016, with the goal of overthrowing the elected Turkish government. Since then, it has claimed responsibility for several attacks on security personnel in Turkey.

== Background ==
The alliance chose to declare their founding on March 12 to announce to the world their commitment to the struggle against the AKP government in Turkey. March 12, 2016, was the 45th anniversary of the 1971 Turkish military memorandum, the 21st anniversary of the Gazi Quarter riots, and the 12th anniversary of the 2004 al-Qamishli riots. All three of these events serve as reminders of the alliance's mission "to lead victoriously our struggle for the Revolution, democracy and socialism." Contemporary reports identified ten organizations as participants in the alliance when it was announced in March 2016.

The alliance believes that Erdoğan's party, the Justice and Development Party (AKP), seeks to implement a new leadership in Turkey, effectively restoring the dictatorship established on March 12, 1971. Five members of the alliance (TKP/ML, MLKP, TKEP/L, Devrimci Karargâh, and MLSPB) are also members of the International Freedom Battalion, a small group of foreign fighters supporting the Syrian Democratic Forces in the Rojava conflict.

== Motives ==
The organization has called for the destruction of the majority Justice and Development Party (AKP) and the overthrow of its elected government. The organization has claimed that it is struggling for the "self-determination" of minorities:

If the struggle for Kurdish self-determination is broken, the AKP will start to attack all other opposition forces in Turkey. Consequently, the future of all progressive, revolutionary and working class forces in Turkey is directly tied to the future of the Kurdish resistance.

The organization has called for the "mobilization of a unified popular revolution" in order to overthrow the elected government. It has claimed itself to be against "imperialism, fascism, racism, capitalism, and conservatism" on its path to a revolution, calling for "our peoples, our workers, the oppressed, all cultures starting with the Alevis, the women, the youth to join the ranks of the Revolutionary United Movement and to struggle."

== Member organizations ==
The following organizations were in attendance at the joint press meeting announcing the alliance:

- Communist Labour Party of Turkey/Leninist (TKEP/L)
- Devrimci Karargâh (DK)
- Kurdistan Workers' Party (PKK)
- Maoist Communist Party (MKP)
- Marxist–Leninist Communist Party (MLKP)
- People's Liberation Party-Front of Turkey/Marxist–Leninist Armed Propaganda Union (THKP-C/MLSPB)
- Revolutionary Communard Party (DKP)
- Communist Party of Turkey-Marxist–Leninist (TKP-ML)
- Union of Revolutionary Communists of Turkey (TİKB)

The Coordination of Revolutionary Proletarians (PDK) has also announced that they have joined the alliance, while the Resurrection Movement (TDH) has expressed interest in joining.

== Activities ==
Soon after its formation, the movement began conducting armed operations against the Turkish government. On May 6, 2016, HBDH attacked a Gendarmerie General Command base in Giresun Province in northeastern Turkey. According to news reports, a roadside bomb exploded, targeting a Gendarmerie vehicle. HDBH claimed responsibility for the attack on May 8, stating that three gendarmes died in the attack, as well as the Base Commander, who was the intended target. This was inconsistent with the Odatv release, which reported only 1 casualty.

Since its initial attack, the Joint Command of the Peoples' United Revolutionary Movement has claimed responsibility for several more attacks in the region, primarily targeting Turkish soldiers or gendarmes. The tactics employed by the alliance are very similar to those used by the PKK. The most notable attack came on July 19, just 4 days after the 2016 Turkish coup d'état attempt. HBDH reported that they had killed 11 riot police in Trabzon Province at 08:30 that morning. The HBDH report is consistent in time and location to an attack reported by Doğan News Agency, in which "unknown assailants" fired on a police checkpoint. This report states that 3 officers were killed and 5 were injured, along with a civilian.

On the night of January 16th, 2025, HBDH's Atakan Mahir Militia set alight a municipal bus in Sarıyer, Istanbul. The following night, a bomb attack by HBDH's Sinan Dersim Militia was carried out in Akdeniz, Mersin, which injured an estimated 8 soldiers.

== See also ==
- Civil conflict in Turkey
- Civil Protection Units
- Communist Party of Turkey/Marxist–Leninist (Maoist Party Centre)
- International Freedom Battalion
- Kurdistan Communities Union
- Revolutionary People's Liberation Party/Front
- United Freedom Forces
- YDG-H
