= Communist Party of Turkey/Marxist–Leninist – Hareketi =

Türkiye Komünist Partisi/Marksist-Leninist - Hareketi Communist Party of Turkey/Marxist–Leninist – Movement
- Founded: 1976
- Newspaper: Devrimci Halkın Birliği
- Ideology: Marxism–Leninism; Anti-revisionism; Hoxhaism
- Political position: Far-left
- International affiliation: Pro-Albanian camp
- Colours: Red

Party flag

Communist Party of Turkey/Marxist–Leninist – Hareketi (in Turkish: Türkiye Komünist Partisi/Marksist-Leninist - Hareketi, Hareketi is Turkish for 'Movement') was a clandestine Marxist-Leninist and Hoxhaist party in Turkey. TKP/ML Hareketi was born in 1976, through a split in the Communist Party of Turkey/Marxist-Leninist (TKP/ML). TKP/ML-Hareketi wanted to move away from the Maoist orthodoxy of TKP/ML, and alienated itself towards concepts such as 'People's War'.

== History ==
In 1978 TKP/ML-Hareketi started publishing Devrimci Halkın Birliği.

In 1978 split with a minority forming a new party, Communist Party of Turkey/Marxist-Leninist (New Build-Up Organization) (TKP/ML (YIÖ)).

TKP/ML-Hareketi held its First Conference in 1979.

In 1980 TKP/ML-Hareketi renounced Maoism. By that time the party had started supporting the political line of the Albanian Party of Labour. However, unlike Revolutionary Communist Party of Turkey (TDKP), they were never seen as official affiliates by Albania. Following the coup d'état of 1980, many of the main cadres of TKP/ML-Hareketi migrated to Western Europe.

The party passed through a period of internal conflict in 1983–1984. This prompted the First Extraordinary Conference to be held in 1986.

In 1989 the party signed a declaration together with the Communist Workers Movement of Turkey (TKİH), calling for communist unity. In 1990 a coordination committee was formed by TKP/ML-Hareketi, the TKİH and the Revolutionary Communist Workers Movement of Turkey (TDKİH), in order to create a unified party.

The Fourth Conference of TKP/ML-Hareketi was held in 1991. The Fifth Conference held in 1993 affirmed the intentions to go ahead with the merger plans.

In September 1994 TKP/ML-Hareketi and TKİH merged to form the MLKP-K.

== Activities ==
On 27 October 1992, six guerillas of TKP/ML-Hareketi were killed in Kilis Province by the Turkish state forces.

== See also ==
- List of anti-revisionist groups
- List of illegal political parties in Turkey
- Communist Party of Turkey (disambiguation), for other groups using similar names
