= Communist Party of Turkey/Marxist–Leninist (New Build-Up Organization) =

Communist Party of Turkey/Marxist–Leninist (New Build-Up Organization) Türkiye Komünist Partisi/Marksist-Leninist (Yeniden İnşa Örgütü)
- Founded: 1978
- Ideology: Marxism–Leninism; Anti-revisionism; Hoxhaism
- Political position: Far-left
- International affiliation: Pro-Albanian camp
- Colours: Red

Communist Party of Turkey/Marxist–Leninist (New Build-Up Organization) (Turkish: Türkiye Komünist Partisi/Marksist-Leninist (Yeniden İnşa Örgütü), TKP/ML (YİÖ)) was a clandestine Marxist-Leninist and Hoxhaist party in Turkey formed in 1978 following a split in the Communist Party of Turkey/Marxist–Leninist – Hareketi (TKP/ML-Hareketi). Initially, the party was known as TKP/ML-Popular Unity (TKP/ML-Halkın Birliği). TKP/ML (YİÖ) accused the TKP/ML-Hareketi leadership of rightist deviations and neglecting the need for armed struggle.

TKP/ML (YİÖ) upheld the political line of the Albanian Party of Labour.

In September 1995, TKP/ML (YİÖ) merged into the Marxist–Leninist Communist Party (MLKP).

== See also ==
- List of illegal political parties in Turkey
- List of anti-revisionist groups
- Communist Party of Turkey (disambiguation) for other communist parties in Turkey
