= Jaysh Muhammad in Bilad al-Sham =

Former militant group in Syria

- جيش محمد في بلاد الشام
- Founding leader: Abu Obeida al-Masri
- Dates active: Late 2012–2016
- Dissolved: 2016
- Merged into: Al-Nusra Front; Islamic Front
- Allegiance: Al-Nusra Front (until 2016)
- Ideology: Salafi Jihadism
- Status: dissolved

Jaysh Muhammad in Bilad al-Sham (Arabic: جيش محمد في بلاد الشام, romanized: Jaysh Muḥammad fī bilād al-Shām, lit. 'The Army of Muhammad in the lands of the Levant') was a jihadist organization based in Aleppo, Syria, that fought in the Syrian civil war. The group was led by an Egyptian foreign militant named Abu Obeida al-Masri/Muhajir until 2014 who also led the group after splitting from a sector led by Ahmed Obeid in the Azaz area of north Aleppo countryside at the end of 2012. After Abu Obeida al-Masri left the group to go with the Islamic Front in Latakia, the Majlis al-Shura decided to pledge allegiance to Al-Nusra Front in 2016.

== History ==
The group was established around late 2012 by Abu Obeida al-Masri during the start of the Syrian civil war in Aleppo, specifically Azaz. They were an ally to both Al-Nusra Front and the Islamic State of Iraq and Syria (before the establishment of the so-called caliphate) and helped the Islamic State in Iraq and Syria defeat the Northern Storm Brigade in Azaz. Even after the Islamic State declared a caliphate, it still helped the Islamic State in 2015 and 2016 in armed offensives. Though due to the complications of the fighting for and against the Islamic State, the group decided to ultimately leave the area of Azaz. Though before leaving Azaz, the group who was sympathetic to the Islamic State decided to, in 2014, established a daw'ah (state) office in Azaz as a part of the Aleppo Province. In 2016 the group pledged to implement sharia law and vowed to strengthen its relations with Al-Nusra Front. Even after the withdrawal of the Islamic State and the return of the Northern Storm, Jaysh Muhammad in Bilad al-Sham retained its presence in Azaz until in 2014 the Northern Storm asked to leave Azaz, so the group and its leader went to Latakia and the group split into the Islamic Front and Al-Nusra Front after the Majlis al-Shura of the group decided to pledge allegiance to Al-Nusra Front. In North Latakia, Jaysh Muhammad in Bilad al-Sham decided to follow the advances of Jaysh al-Fatah in building influence in the area against Harakat Sham al-Islam.

The group also had a small presence in Egypt. Through the media institution of Jaysh Muhammad in Bilad al-Sham, Al-Mi'ad, showed members of the group Ajnad Misr attacking the presidential palace in Cairo, Egypt.
