= Ivana Hoffmann =

German communist (1995–2015)

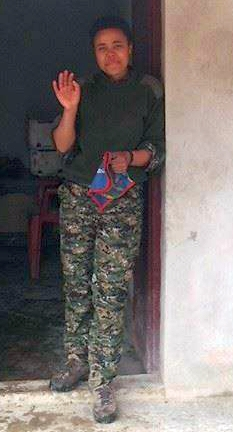
- Born: 1 September 1995; Emmerich am Rhein, Germany
- Died: 7 March 2015 (aged 19); Tell Tamer Subdistrict, Syria
- Other name: Avaşin Tekoşin Güneş
- Military career
- Allegiance: Autonomous Administration of North and East Syria
- Branch: Marxist–Leninist Communist Party (Turkey) (MLKP)

Ivana Hoffmann (1 September 1995 – 7 March 2015), also known as Avaşin Tekoşin Güneş, was a German feminist communist who fought with the Marxist–Leninist Communist Party (Turkey) (MLKP) in the Rojava conflict of the Syrian civil war. She was the first female foreign fighter in the Syrian Democratic Forces to die in the conflict.

== Biography ==
Hoffmann was born in Emmerich am Rhein to a German mother and Togolese father. The mother and Ivana later moved to Duisburg where they lived in the Meiderich neighborhood and Hoffmann began to get involved into left-wing politics and came into contact with the movement of the MLKP.

Hoffmann travelled to Syria to join the Rojava conflict in late 2014. In a video published after her death, Hoffman gave her reasons for joining: "I decided to come to Rojava because they are fighting for humanity here, for rights and for internationalism that the MLKP represents. We are here as the MLKP to fight for freedom. Rojava is the beginning. Rojava is hope."

Hoffmann was killed by the Islamic State of Iraq and the Levant (ISIL) while fighting alongside the People's Protection Units near Tell Tamer during the Eastern al-Hasakah offensive. Anti-ISIL activists commemorating Hoffmann were later arrested in İzmir, Turkey. To date, Hoffmann was the youngest foreign fighter killed fighting for the SDF.

The public prosecutor's office in Duisburg confiscated the body in order to have it autopsied. The Federal Prosecutor's Office has vouched to prosecute the Marxist–Leninist Communist Party (MLKP). It considered supporters of the organization should be charged because of their support to a foreign terrorist organization. In response, The Solidarity Committee for Ivana Hoffmann terms this as a "scandal".

On March 14, 2015, a rally followed by a funeral march was held in Duisburg in commemoration of Hoffmann, with participants from the Marxist-Leninist spectrum. Different sources reported a turnout of somewhere between 500 and 6000 participants. The family of Ivana Hoffmann was also present. The march accompanied her coffin from the District Court in the district of Hamborn to the cemetery Bügelstraße in Meiderich, where she was buried. Multiple representatives of communist organizations from Germany, Spain, and Turkey, as well as high-ranking representatives of the Kurdish Freedom Movement, such as the Chairwoman of the Peoples' Democratic Party, Figen Yüksekdağ, and Salih Muslim, Chairman of the Democratic Union Party, spoke at the event.
