= Konstandinos Erik Scurfield =

Konstandinos Erik "Kosta" Scurfield (22 September 1989 – 2 March 2015) was a former British Royal Marine who, in December 2014, left for Syria and joined the Kurdish YPG, a militia fighting against the Islamic State. Scurfield, who was known by the Kurdish nom de guerre Sehid Kemal, was of Greek descent. He volunteered and served six months in the Greek Army at the age of 20. When he returned to the UK, he became a battlefield medic in the Royal Marines. Retiring in September 2014, he got in contact with the YPG, flew to Syria to join them and arrived in December 2014. He immediately took part in the December 2014 Sinjar offensive. His mother stated that he flew to Syria because "the Kurds are dying and our government's doing nothing".

He was killed on 2 March 2015 by an ambush by the IS near the town Tel Hamis, at the age of 25. He was the first British citizen to be killed in the conflict. After his death, activists lobbied for the British government to further support the YPG, warning that otherwise "we will hear of more of those tragedies".
