= United Freedom Forces =

Militia involved in the Syrian civil war

- Birleşik Özgürlük Güçleri
- Logo of Birleşik Özgürlük Güçleri
- Leaders: Ulaş Bayraktaroğlu † (chief commander); Bayram Ali (Spokesperson); Aziz Güler † (Commander)
- Dates active: December 2014 – present
- Ideology: Revolutionary socialism
- Political position: Far-left
- Status: Active
- Part of: International Freedom Battalion
- Wars: Syrian Civil War
- Website: www.ozgurlukgucleri.org

The United Freedom Forces (Turkish: Birleşik Özgürlük Güçleri, or BÖG) is a joint expatriate militia of several revolutionary socialist organizations from Turkey, most notably the Revolutionary Communard Party (DKP), active in the Rojava conflict of the Syrian Civil War.

Inspired by the International Brigades of the Spanish Civil War, the militia was founded in December 2014 in Kobanê within the de facto autonomous region of Rojava in Syria.

The predominant Hoxhaist Marxist–Leninist Communist Party and the Maoist TİKKO did not join the United Freedom Forces, but together with other communist groups from Turkey, Spain and Greece, in June 2015, they altogether formed the International Freedom Battalion.

== Member groups ==
=== Revolutionary Communard Party ===
The Revolutionary Communard Party (Turkish: Devrimci Komünarlar Partisi, abbreviated as DKP) is a revolutionary socialist group from Turkey. It was founded in February 2016 as a merger of the Proletarian Revolutionary Liberation Organisation (Turkish: Proleter Devrimci Kurtuluş Örgütü, abbreviated as PDKÖ) and the Revolution Party of Turkey (Turkish: Türkiye Devrim Partisi, abbreviated as TDP). Devrimci Karargâh joined in 2017. The party is the most notable group behind BÖG and also part of the Peoples' United Revolutionary Movement alliance in Turkey with the PKK and nine other groups.

=== MLSPB-DC ===
The Marxist–Leninist Armed Propaganda Corps-Revolutionary Front (Turkish: Marksist Leninist Silahlı Propaganda Birliği-Devrim Cephesi, abbreviated as MLSPB-DC) is a communist armed group from Turkey. A battalion was created by Devrimci Karargâh and MLSPB-DC named after Alper Çakas, an MLSPB-DC fighter killed while fighting in Rojava. It is also part of the Peoples' United Revolutionary Movement.

One of the flags used by Sosyal Isyan. An eco-anarchist flag with the colors green and black is also used by the group.

=== Sosyal İsyan ===
Social Insurrection (Turkish: Sosyal İsyan, abbreviated as Sİ) is a green anarchist and platformist group from Turkey. Sİ was founded in 2013, in the Tuzluçayır district of Ankara. Members of the group cite the influence of Alfredo M. Bonanno, Nestor Makhno, and Pierre-Joseph Proudhon.

=== Units ===
Flag of the Women's Freedom Forces.

- Women's Freedom Forces (Kadın Özgürlük Gücü)
- Devrimci Cephe
  - Devrimci Karargâh
- Aziz Güler Özgürlük Gücü Milis Örgütü
- Kader Ortakaya Timi
- Kızılbaş Timi
- Mahir Arpaçay Devrimci Savaş Okulu
- Necdet Adalı Müfrezesi
- Spartaküs Timi
- Şehit Bedreddin Taburu
- Kader Ortakaya Timi
- Emek ve Özgürlük Cephesi

== Controversy with Turkey ==
On 21 September 2015, BÖG commander Aziz Güler (nom de guerre: Rasih Kurtuluş) was killed by a landmine explosion whilst fighting against ISIL. His body was taken to a hospital in Serê Kaniyê (Ras al-Ayn) to be brought back to Turkey. Turkish authorities refused to allow his body into the country, sparking controversy. His family had appealed to the Suruç district governorate, which rejected their application due to an invisible order by the Council of Ministers, and the Constitutional Court of Turkey, which also rejected their requests, before turning to the European Court of Human Rights. After 59 days, Güler's body was able to enter Turkey and was buried in Istanbul on 22 November 2015.

== See also ==
- People's Protection Units
- List of armed groups in the Syrian Civil War

== Bibliography ==
- The Carter Center (27 February 2017). "Foreign Volunteers for the Syrian Kurdish Forces" (PDF). Atlanta: Carter Center.
