= Revolutionary Union for Internationalist Solidarity =

Anarchist military unit

- Επαναστατικός Σύνδεσμος Διεθνιστικής Αλληλεγγύης
- Emblem of the RUIS
- Dates active: April 2015 – present
- Active regions: Rojava
- Ideology: Anarchism; Anarcho-communism
- Political position: Far-left
- Status: Active
- Part of: International Freedom Battalion
- Wars: Rojava conflict of the Syrian Civil War
- Website: Twitter

The Revolutionary Union for Internationalist Solidarity (Greek: Επαναστατικός Σύνδεσμος Διεθνιστικής Αλληλεγγύης, abbreviated as ΕΣΔΑ or RUIS) is a Greek anarchist military unit involved in the Syrian Civil War. It was founded in 2015 and joined the International Freedom Battalion (IFB).

== Establishment ==
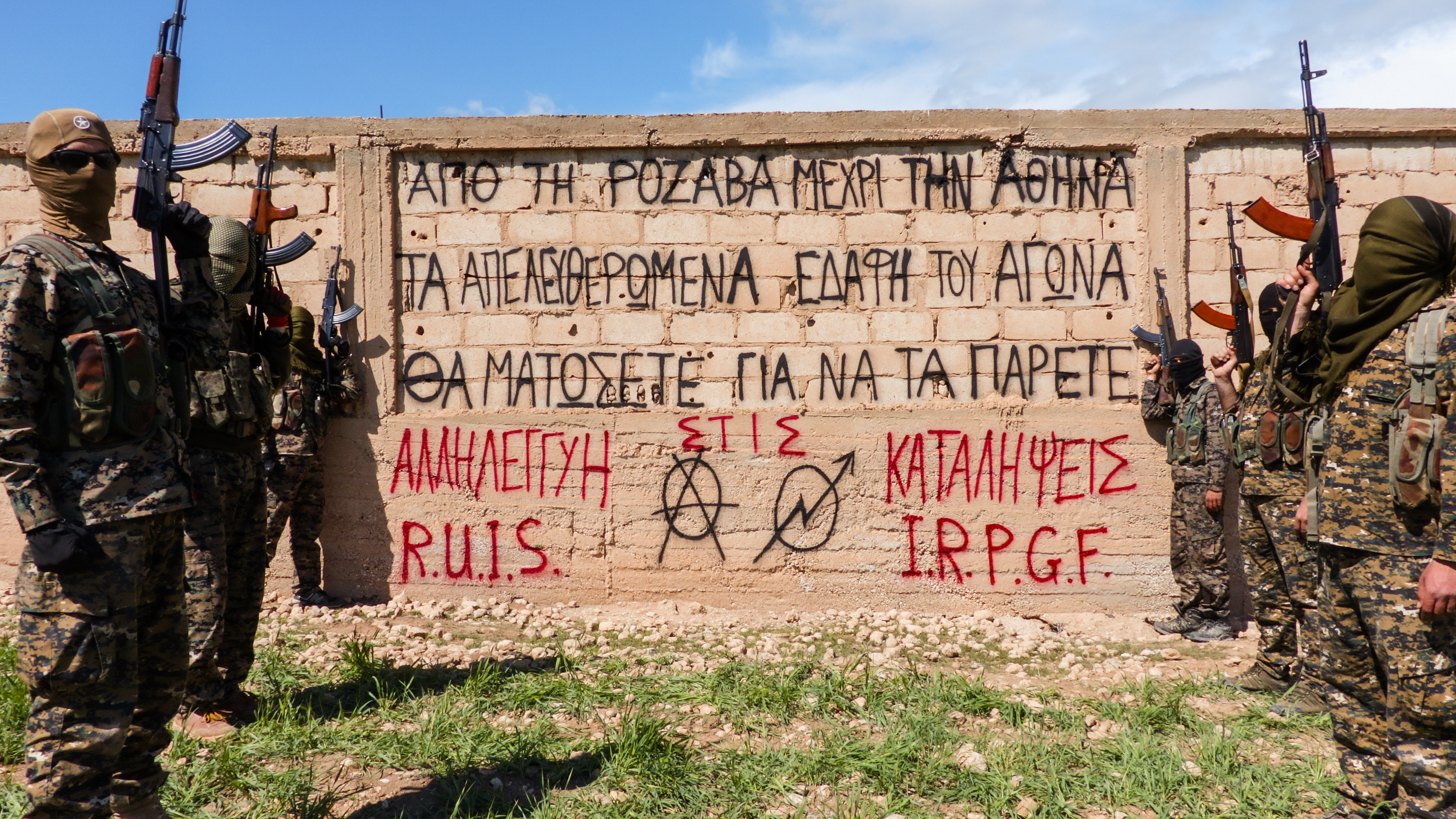
RUIS members in Rojava

Following the outbreak of the Syrian Civil War, in 2012, the autonomous region of Rojava was established in northern Syria, where the Kurdish-led People's Protection Units (YPG) fought against the Syrian Arab Republic and the Islamic State. Many Greek anarchists volunteered to fight for the YPG, seeking to gain experience in guerrilla warfare and apply their tactics back in Greece. In 2015, Greek anarchists and anarcho-communists established the Revolutionary Union for Internationalist Solidarity (RUIS), as a specifically anarchist military unit.

It joined the International Freedom Battalion (IFB), an organisation of left-wing foreign volunteers established in June 2015, which fights alongside the YPG. The RUIS was a later addition to the IFB, which was initially predominated by Turkish Marxist-Leninist organisations. In May 2017, the RUIS made a statement declaring it would spill blood "from Rojava to Athens", which caught the attention of the Greek authorities.

== Death of Haukur Hilmarsson ==
In early 2018, one of its fighters, the Icelandic anarchist Haukur Hilmarsson, was killed by the Turkish Armed Forces during the Turkish invasion of Afrin. In its announcement of his death, the RUIS declared that he had "become immortal" and that his example had inspired them to continue their "resistance against fascism and tyranny". In response, the RUIS called for attacks against assets of the Turkish state in Greece. The following year, far-left groups affiliated with the RUIS attacked the Turkish consulate in Thessaloniki and set fire to a Turkish diplomatic vehicle.

== See also ==
- Anarchism in Syria
- Rojava Revolution
- International Freedom Battalion
- International Revolutionary People's Guerrilla Forces

== Bibliography ==
- Hatahet, Sinan; Cengiz, Mehmet Emin; Rashid, Bedir Mulla (2019). The phenomenon of YPG transnational fighters in Syria (Report). Al Sharq Forum.
- Jayakumar, Shashi (2019). Transnational volunteers against ISIS (PDF) (Report). International Center for Study of Radicalization.
- Kompatsiaris, Panos (2019). "On the Heroisms of Today: Experience, Memory and Risk as Anti-fascist Politics in Contemporary Art". Third Text. 33 (3): 1–16. doi:10.1080/09528822.2019.1628447. ISSN 1475-5297.
- Koch, Ariel (2019). "The Non-Jihadi Foreign Fighters: Western Right-Wing and Left-Wing Extremists in Syria". Terrorism and Political Violence. 33 (4): 669–696. doi:10.1080/09546553.2019.1581614.
- Orton, Kyle (2017). The forgotten foreign fighters: The PKK in Syria (PDF) (Report). Henry Jackson Society. ISBN 978-1-909035-32-4.
- Orton, Kyle (2018). "The Secular Foreign Fighters of the West in Syria". Insight Turkey. 3 (20): 157–178. doi:10.25253/99.2018203.12. ISSN 1302-177X. JSTOR 26469849.
- Öz, Volkan (2023). "Fighting Fire with Fire? An Assesment of the Potential Threats of Westerners Fighting against ISIS in Syria and Iraq". Savunma Bilimleri Dergisi. 1 (43): 51–74. doi:10.17134/khosbd.1085135.
- Schmidinger, Thomas (2024). "Kurdish Armed Liberation Movement or Ground Forces of the Global Coalition against ISIS? The YPG/YPJ and the Syrian Democratic Forces (SDF)". In Lohlker, Rüdiger; Ivanyi, Katharina (eds.). Agents of Violence. Brill. pp. 173–203. doi:10.30965/9783657794478_007. ISBN 978-3-506-79447-5.
- Soner, Bayram Ali; Aslan, Ömer; Kıyıcı, Hakan (2017). PKK's regional franchise of terror (PDF) (Report). International Center for Terrorism and Security Studies. ISBN 978-605-4619-47-4.
- Yet, Dağhan (2023). "Quick-Impact Approach in Information Warfare: Turkish Experience". In Ateş, Barış (ed.). Military Innovation in Türkiye. Routledge. pp. 188–202. doi:10.4324/9781003327127-10. ISBN 9781003327127.
- "Greek Anarchists Are Helping Kurdish Forces Fight ISIS". Vice News. 2 June 2017.
