= Devrimci Karargâh =

Defunct Marxist-Leninist communist organization

Revolutionary Headquarters
- Devrimci Karargâh
- Leader: Serdar Kaya
- Founded: 2009
- Dates active: 2009 – February 2017
- Country: Turkey
- Active regions: Turkey
- Ideology: Communism; Marxism–Leninism
- Political position: Far-left

Devrimci Karargâh (English: Revolutionary Headquarters) was a nominally Marxist-Leninist organization in Turkey.

== History ==
DK first came to public attention in April 2009, when some of its members were involved in a six-hour gun battle with police in the Istanbul neighbourhood of Bostancı, leading to the death of a policeman, a bystander, and the organization's leader Orhan Yılmazkaya. 20 of its members were arrested in September 2009. DK is also held responsible for several bomb attacks in 2008/9.

Journalist Aylin Duruoglu was detained for over six months for knowing one of DK's alleged members. Former police chief Hanefi Avcı, an Islamist-leaning conservative, is also accused and was charged in the Odatv case of the Ergenekon trials.

DK may have been infiltrated by Turkey's National Intelligence Organization (MIT): MIT agent Murat Şahin was arrested in a raid on the DK in December 2011, and released a week later and his file separated from those of others arrested. In February 2017 Devrimci Karargâh announced it was dissolving and becoming part of the Revolutionary Communard Party, the main organisation composing the United Freedom Forces.
