= Tuzluçayır, Refahiye =

Village in Turkey

Tuzluçayır
- Village
- Location in Turkey
- Coordinates: 39°50′34″N 38°29′45″E
- Country: Turkey
- Province: Erzincan
- District: Refahiye
- Population (2022): 41
- Time zone: UTC+3 (TRT)

Tuzluçayır, formerly Çorak, is a village in the Refahiye District of Erzincan Province in Turkey. The village is populated by Kurds and had a population of 41 in 2022.
