= Marxist–Leninist Communist Party (Turkey) =

Marxist–Leninist Communist Party Marksist-Leninist Komünist Partisi
- Founded: 10 September 1994; 32 years ago
- Merger of: TKP/ML-Hareketi; TKİH; TKP/ML (YIÖ)
- Youth wing: Komünist Gençlik Örgütü
- Women's wing: Komünist Kadın Örgütü
- Armed wing: Fakirlerin ve Ezilenlerin Silahlı Kuvvetleri
- Ideology: Communism; Marxism–Leninism; Anti-revisionism; Hoxhaism
- Political position: Far-left
- National affiliation: HBDH
- International affiliation: ICOR; IFB

Party flag

Website
- www.mlkp-info.org

The Marxist–Leninist Communist Party (Turkish: Marksist-Leninist Komünist Partisi, abbreviated as MLKP) is an underground Hoxhaist communist party in Turkey. It was founded in 1994, and has been involved in the Rojava conflict since 2012.

== History ==
MLKP was formed in September 1994, through the unification of the Communist Party of Turkey/Marxist-Leninist - Hareketi (TKP/ML-Hareketi) and the Communist Workers Movement of Turkey (TKİH). TKP/ML-Hareketi was the larger of the two. Both groups came from the pro-Albanian camp. The unity process of negotiations between the groups had started in 1989. Initially MLKP called itself MLKP-Kuruluş (MLKP-Foundation).

In September 1995, at the first congress of MLKP-K, the Communist Party of Turkey/Marxist-Leninist (New Build-Up Organization) (TKP/ML (YİÖ)) merged into the party, and the name was changed to MLKP. Later the same year a split occurred, and the Communist Party - Build-up Organization (KP-İÖ) was formed.

MLKP is designated as an active terrorist organisation in Turkey by the Counter-Terrorism and Operations Department of the General Directorate of Security. During the Ergenekon investigation, it was claimed by prosecutors that Ergenekon planned to take over the MLKP, as well as the PKK, and that it was successful to a certain extent. In the same investigation, it was found that the hand grenades found in Lieutenant Colonel Mustafa Dönmez' had the same series number as those used by the MLKP.

== Organisation ==
The youth wing of MLKP is called the Communist Youth Organization (Turkish: Komünist Gençlik Örgütü, abbreviated as KGÖ).

MLKP maintains an armed wing named Armed Forces of the Poor and the Oppressed (Turkish: Fakirlerin ve Ezilenlerin Silahlı Kuvvetleri, abbreviated as FESK). The group had international exposure at the Hilton Istanbul Bosphorus bombing prior to 2004 Istanbul summit where four people were killed. In April 2015, it was announced that MLKP founded a permanent military training centre in PKK-controlled areas of the Iraqi Kurdistan. In July 2015, they attempted a bomb attack on Star Media Group.

The organisation has had three periodicals: Atılım (The Leap) (or Yeni Atılım, The New Leap), a daily news bulletin; Partinin Sesi (The Voice of the Party), an institutional publication; and Teoride Doğrultu (The Direction in Theory), a theoretical-political journal. The 26th and last issue of Teoride Doğrultu was published in 2006.

=== Human resources ===
A study carried out by the Counter-Terrorism and Operations Department of General Directorate of Security over a sample of files about people convicted of being a terrorist under Turkish laws including 826 militants from the organisation and the three other currently active left-wing organisations 65% of the members are aged 14 to 25, 16.8% 25 to 30 and 17.5% are older than 30. University graduates make up 20.4% of the members, high school graduates 33.5%, secondary school graduates 14%, primary school graduates 29.9% and illiterates 1.9% (while they have no sampled literate non-graduate members).

== Involvement in Syrian Civil War ==
MLKP has reportedly been sending volunteers to Syria to fight with the PYD's People's Protection Units (YPG) of Rojava (Syrian Kurdistan) since 2012. At least four of these fighters have been killed in battle as of February 2015—one during the Battle of Ras al-Ayn, and three during the Siege of Kobanî. MLKP has also declared its intention to form a leftist international brigade within the YPG, modeled after the famous International Brigades who fought on the side of the Second Spanish Republic in the Spanish Civil War. The party released a video in late January 2015 purporting to show several Spanish- and German-speaking communist volunteers from Europe among its ranks in Jazira Canton. In March 2015, Ivana Hoffmann, a MLKP member and German national and daughter of a German mother and a Togolese father, was reported to be killed in clashes with the Islamic State of Iraq and the Levant.

The MLKP has set up a political branch in PYD-governed territories as well, known as MLKP (Rojava).

MLKP fighters have also joined Kurdistan Workers' Party (PKK) formations fighting in northern Iraq in defence of the Yezidi minority of Sinjar.

== See also ==
- List of illegal political parties in Turkey
- Socialist Party of the Oppressed
- Marxist–Leninist Party (Communist Reconstruction)
- List of anti-revisionist groups
