= Operation Olive Branch order of battle =

Order of battle

This is the order of battle for the Operation Olive Branch, a joint Turkish Armed Forces/Syrian National Army attack on the People's Protection Units-held Afrin Canton.

== Turkey and allied forces ==
- Turkey
  - Turkish Armed Forces
    - Land Forces
      - Second Army
        - 4th Corps (Turkey)
          - 1st Commando Brigade
        - 7th Corps (Turkey)
          - 3rd Commando Brigade (Turkey)
    - Special forces
    - Air Force
    - Gendarmerie General Command
      - Gendarmerie Special Public Security Command
        - Gendarmerie Special Operations (JÖH)
        - Village guards
  - Turkish Naval Forces
    - SAS EOD (Explosive Ordnance Disposal)
    - SAT
  - General Directorate of Security
    - Police Special Operation Department (PÖH)
  - National Intelligence Organization (MİT)

Grey Wolves (claimed by SOHR)

- Syrian Interim Government
  - Syrian National Army
    - First Legion
      - (Syrian opposition) Northern Brigade
      - (Syrian opposition) Jaysh al-Ahfad
      - Samarkand Brigade
      - Muntasir Billah Brigade
      - (Syrian opposition) Ahrar al-Sharqiya
      - Sultan Mehmed the Conqueror Brigade
      - (Syrian opposition) Waqqas Brigade
      - Sham Legion (northern contingent)
      - Sultan Suleiman Shah Brigade
      - (Syrian opposition) 9th Division
      - Jaysh al-Nukhba (northern sector)
        - Elite Battalion (Azadî Battalion)
      - (Syrian opposition) Jaysh al-Sharqiya
      - (Syrian opposition) Northern Falcons Brigade
    - Second Legion
      - Sultan Murad Division
      - (Syrian opposition) Hamza Division
        - Kurdish Falcons Brigade
      - Al-Mu'tasim Brigade
        - Men of War Brigade
      - (Syrian opposition) Authenticity and Development Front
      - Elite Division
    - Third Legion
      - (Syrian opposition) Levant Front
        - Conquest Brigade
        - (Syrian opposition) Northern Storm Brigade
        - (Syrian opposition) Northern Army
      - (Syrian opposition) 51st Division
      - (Syrian opposition) Mustafa Brigade (ex-13th Division unit)
      - 1st Regiment
      - (Syrian opposition) Sultan Othman Brigade
      - (Syrian opposition) Island Revolutionaries
      - Fastaqim Union remnants
      - 23rd Division (northern branch)
      - (Syrian opposition) Glory Corps
    - Unincorporated SNA factions
      - (Syrian opposition) 1st Commando Regiment
      - Conqueror Lions Brigade
      - Resolute Storm Brigade
      - (Syrian opposition) Hasakah Shield Brigade
      - (Syrian opposition) 5th Regiment
      - Jaysh Ansar al-Allah
  - Saladin Brigade
  - Ahl al-Diyar
  - Martyr Mashaal Tammo Brigade
  - Qamishli Shield
  - Afrin Shield
  - Tajama a-Thuwar al-Kurd (coalition of Kurdish units in the TFSA)
  - Mare' Military Council
- Rebel reinforcements from Idlib
  - (Syrian opposition) Jaysh al-Nasr
  - (Syrian opposition) Jaysh al Thani
  - Nour al-Din al-Zenki Movement
  - Ahrar al-Sham
  - Turkistan Islamic Party in Syria

== Democratic Federation of Northern Syria and allied forces ==
Syrian Democratic Forces

- People's Protection Units (YPG)
  - YPG International Battalion
    - American, British and German fighters
- Women's Protection Units (YPJ)
  - Martyr Avesta Xabur Battalion (Kongreya Star volunteers)
- Anti-Terror Units (YAT)
- Syriac Military Council (MFS)
- Army of Revolutionaries
  - Kurdish Front
  - Revolutionary Shield Brigade
- Northern Democratic Brigade
  - Idlib Military Council

Afrin Region forces

- Self-Defence Forces (HXP)
- Civil Defence Forces (HPC)
- Asayish

Kurdistan Workers' Party (PKK)

- People's Defence Forces (HPG)

International Freedom Battalion and Peoples' United Revolutionary Movement

- MLKP
- TKP/ML TİKKO
- United Freedom Forces
  - THKP-C/MLSPB
  - DKP
- TKEP/L
- RUIS
- Martyr Michael Israel Brigade (Antifascist Forces in Afrin)
  - Anarchist Struggle

Sinjar Alliance

- Sinjar Resistance Units (YBŞ)
- Êzîdxan Women's Units (YJÊ)

Anti-Turkish insurgents in Afrin District (from June 2018)

- Afrin Falcons
- Wrath of Olives operations room
- Afrin Liberation Forces

(Syria) Pro-government forces ("Popular Forces")

- National Defence Forces
- Baqir Brigade
- Militias from Nubl and al-Zahraa
