= Revolutionary Communard Party =

Revolutionary Communard Party Devrimci Komünarlar Partisi (DKP)
- General Secretary: Ulaş Adalı
- Founded: February 4, 2016
- Ideology: Communism; Marxism–Leninism
- National affiliation: HBDH
- International affiliation: BÖG (part of IFB)

Website
- https://komunarlar.org/

The Revolutionary Communard Party (Turkish: Devrimci Komünarlar Partisi, DKP) is a left-wing political organisation founded on 4 February 2016, following the merger of the Liberation Movement and the Turkish Revolutionary Party.

The DKP is part of the United Freedom Forces and International Freedom Battalion (IFB), participating in the Rojava conflict in the de facto autonomous AANES territory. The DKP is banned in Turkey due to its alleged affiliation with the outlawed Kurdistan Workers' Party (PKK) group.

The DKP is allied with the SDF (Syrian Democratic Forces) and the Kurdish YPG militia, having fought alongside them during both the Raqqa campaign (2016–2017) against ISIL and Operation Olive Branch against Turkey and the TFSA.

On 4 September 2018, the party split into two factions, the DKP/Birlik and the DKP/BÖG, the Birlik faction criticizing the DKP for being "opportunist" and not breaking with the old traditions. Both factions are fighting as a part of the IFB against the 2019 Turkish offensive into north-eastern Syria.
