= Haukur Hilmarsson =

Icelandic activist (1986–2018)

- Born: Haukur Hilmarsson; 22 July 1986; Iceland
- Died: 24 February 2018 (aged 31); Afrin, Syria
- Cause of death: Turkish airstrike
- Other name: Sahin Hosseini
- Relatives: Mother: Eva Hauksdóttir
- Military career
- Allegiance: Autonomous Administration of North and East Syria
- Branch: International Freedom Battalion
- Service years: 2017–2018
- Unit: RUIS
- Known for: Political activism, fighting with YPG
- Conflicts: Syrian Civil War; Raqqa campaign (2016–2017); Operation Olive Branch †

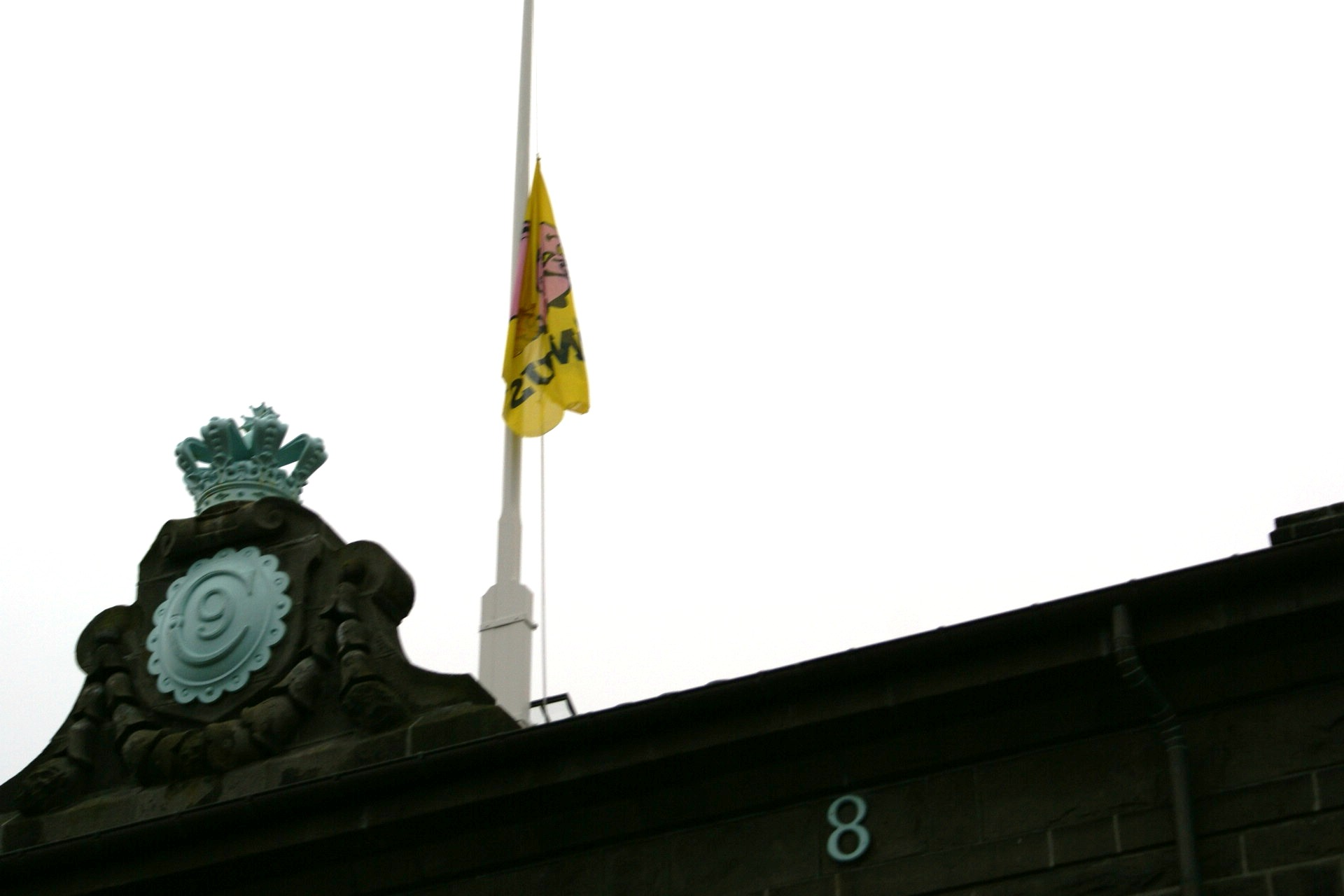
The Bónus flag, raised by Haukur, hanging over the Icelandic parliament building.

Haukur Hilmarsson (22 July 1986 – 24 February 2018) was an Icelandic political activist. He played a crucial role in initiating a movement for the rights of refugees in Iceland. He rose to prominence during the 2009 Icelandic financial crisis protests after climbing to the roof of the house of the Icelandic parliament, Alþingishúsið, and hoisting the flag of the Bónus supermarket chain on the building's flagpole. His arrest two weeks later resulted in an attempt by a crowd of protesters to storm the Icelandic Police headquarters in downtown Reykjavík where Haukur was held and from where he was subsequently released.

== Death ==
Haukur traveled to Syria in 2017 and joined an anarchist unit of the International Freedom Battalion called Revolutionary Union for Internationalist Solidarity (RUIS) alongside the YPG. He participated in the liberation of Raqqa that same year. On 6 March 2018 Turkish media reported that Haukur had been killed in a Turkish airstrike in Afrin on 24 February. As of February 2021, he is presumed dead and his remains have not been found.

== Personal life ==
Haukur was the son of Icelandic activist and writer Eva Hauksdóttir.
