= Anna Campbell =

British anarcha-feminist (1991–2018)

- Born: Anna Montgomery Campbell; 1991; Lewes, East Sussex, England
- Died: 15 March 2018 (aged 26); Afrin District, Syria
- Cause of death: Turkish airstrike
- Other name: Hêlîn Qereçox
- Education: University of Sheffield
- Relatives: Dirk Campbell (father); Katherine Emma "Adrienne Katie" Bridges (mother)
- Military career
- Allegiance: Democratic Federation of Northern Syria
- Branch: YPJ
- Known for: Fighting with the YPJ in the Rojava conflict
- Conflicts: Rojava conflict; Deir ez-Zor campaign; Operation Olive Branch †
- Other work: Plumber, anarchist, feminist, prison abolition activist

Anna Montgomery Campbell (1991 – 16 March 2018), also known by her Kurdish name Hêlîn Qereçox, (Note: Pronounced [heˈlin qæræˈt͡ʃox]. Hêlîn means nest in Kurdish. Qereçox is a name of a mountain near the Semalka Border Crossing.) was a British feminist, anarchist and prison abolition activist who fought with the Women's Protection Units (YPJ) in the Rojava conflict of the Syrian civil war. She was killed in Rojava by a Turkish Armed Forces missile strike.

== Family and early life ==
Campbell was born in Lewes, East Sussex, England, the daughter of progressive rock musician Dirk Campbell. Her mother was Katherine Emma "Adrienne Katie", born Bridges, her father's second wife.

She was educated at St Mary's Hall, Brighton, then went to study at University of Sheffield before moving to Bristol, where she worked as a plumber and in the local radical bookshop Hydra Bookshop. Campbell was involved with many political actions, including the 2010 United Kingdom student protests, the Hunt Saboteurs Association, and was involved in supporting the Irish Travellers at Dale Farm who were resisting their eviction in 2011. She was involved in various anarchist and abolitionist organisations and projects, including the Anarchist Black Cross and ZAD de Notre-Dame-des-Landes.

== Involvement in the Rojava conflict ==
During the Rojava conflict, Campbell fought with the YPJ in the Deir ez-Zor campaign, an attack on the Islamic State of Iraq and the Levant stronghold of Deir ez-Zor. She was also involved in the YPJ's activities in support of women's rights in Kurdistan. According to The New York Times, she was moved by the defence of "an autonomous, mostly Kurdish region in northern Syria, known as Rojava, whose leaders advocate a secular, democratic and egalitarian politics, with equal rights for women".

== Death ==
Campbell was killed on the 15th of March by a Turkish Armed Forces missile strike on her convoy during the Turkish military operation in the Afrin Canton, Operation Olive Branch, making her the first british woman to die fighting for the YPJ. A comrade of Campbell's in the YPJ stated that: “The day before she went to Afrin she said, ‘I’m not looking to die, but if it’s necessary to die in this struggle then I’m ready. I’m proud to die.’”

The YPJ announced:

Our British comrade Hêlîn Qereçox (Anna Campbell) has become the symbol of all women after resisting against fascism in Afrin to create a free world. We promise to fulfill Hêlîn’s struggle and honour her memory in our fight for freedom.

== Legacy ==
Following the announcement of Campbell's death, her father started a campaign to recover her body, which could not be located by aid organisations until a ceasefire was in place in the area. Dirk Campbell accused the British government of 'a total lack of proactivity' in helping to recover her body, In an interview published on 3 November 2024, Dirk Campbell said that although there would be nothing left of her body by now, he was still pursuing action against Turkey for its failure to return the remains as required by the Geneva Convention and the Universal Declaration of Human Rights. The case had been taken to the European Court of Human Rights, but the process was lengthy, and had been sent back to Turkish courts at Hatay. After six and a half years after Anna’s death, he was not much further forward.

In response to Campbell's death there were various protests around the world, protesters from the Bristol Kurdish Solidarity Network (BKSN) and friends of Campbell blocked the offices of BAE Systems in Bristol, the city Anna lived in previously. Activists accused the company of supplying weapons to Turkey which have been used against civilians in Rojava. Another protest in Bristol was held a year after Anna's death, with protestors blocking a large roundabout. Graffiti has also sprung up in the city showing solidarity, particularly in the Easton and St Pauls where many of the anarchist projects she was a part of are based.

A Turkish woman, Peri Pamir, was twice convicted in an Istanbul court for "creating propaganda for a terrorist organisation" after sharing a Guardian article about Campbell on Facebook in 2018.
