= Afrin Liberation Forces =

Kurdish insurgent group in Aleppo Governorate

- Hêzên Rizgariya Efrînê
- Emblem of the HRE
- Dates active: 2018–August 2026
- Split from: People's Protection Units (presumably)
- Country: Syria
- Active regions: Aleppo Governorate
- Size: Several thousand
- Wars: Syrian civil war; Afrin insurgency; 2019 Tell Rifaat clashes; Post-Assad Syrian Conflict; SDF–Syrian Transitional Government clashes (2025–present); Aleppo clashes (2025–2026)

The Afrin Liberation Forces (ALF) (Kurdish: Hêzên Rizgariya Efrînê, HRE), also known as Tahrir Afrin Forces, was a Kurdish insurgent group, which was founded in the aftermath of Operation Olive Branch and the subsequent fall of Afrin to the Syrian National Army (SNA) and Turkish Armed Forces (TAF). The group is mainly located in the Aleppo Governorate of Syria, where it imposes guerilla tactics such as infiltrations, roadside bombs, booby-traps, and assassinations on positions and members of the SNA, TAF and other groups affiliated with the Turkish occupation of northern Syria.

== History ==
=== Founding in 2018 ===
On September 18, 2018, the group carried out two operations in Afrin, which resulted in the death of a Turkish soldier. This was the group's first operation against the Turkish army, which, according to its official website, also marks the date of its founding.

On 21 December, the HRE released a press statement laying out the group's goals; the group stated that they would seek to end the "occupation of their areas" and that they would carry out operations as part of a "justified war" until the region is "liberated". The statement also claimed responsibility for two attacks: one on 18 December involving the detonation of an improvised explosive device (IED) against Turkish soldiers, claiming as many as six men had been injured and killed, and another detonation of an IED on the same date, on forces of the Hamza Division.

=== 2019 ===
On January 21, 2019, the group attacked heavy construction equipment that the Turkish military had used to dig tunnels in Mare'. On April 20, the group claimed to have carried out a series of operations against the Turkish occupation in the villages of Meryamin and Vilat al-Qadi, in addition to the village of Kimara, where more than 6 soldiers were killed.

The Syrian Observatory for Human Rights (SOHR) reported that by 21 March 2019, a total of 613 SNA fighters had been killed, including 447 by March 2018. This indicates that 166 SNA members were killed during this period of the Afrin insurgency, in which the HRE was a key belligerent.

On 4 August, the HRE claimed responsibility for two attacks in northern Aleppo. The first targeted the positions of Sunni Islamist militants of Ahrar al-Sham and Suqur al-Sham in the village of Abla near Mare', reportedly killing eight fighters and wounding four, with weapons and documents seized. The second operation, in Hizwan near Al-Bab, targeted Firqat al-Hamza, leaving three fighters dead and three others injured. On the same day, an IED killed a commander of Ahrar al-Sham, Hussein al-Amin.

=== 2020 ===
In April 2020, the HRE said in a statement, that it killed seven SNA gunmen and a Turkish soldier, and also claimed the destruction of two military vehicles.

In the period between 5 and 11 May, the group claimed to have killed at least six SNA militants and Turkish soldiers in addition to injuring multiple in various assaults, while also destroying a vehicle. A video of two of the attacks was released, in which the HRE utilised anti-tank guided missiles.

On 28 May, the group claimed to have killed nine SNA militants.

On 19 June, the HRE claimed to have killed 14 "Muslim Brotherhood militants" (in reference to SNA militias), while a number of others were wounded. The HRE also released a video in which they displayed weapons which they seized during the operation, including four AK-47s , one PKM with ammunition, one RPG-7, one Zbrojovka Brno rifle, and 1 thermal weapon sight.

=== 2021 ===
In May 2021, HRE forces claimed to have killed and wounded 11 Turkish soldiers and affiliated militants.

On 3 June, the HRE released a video, in which they displayed their attack on SNA militias in the village of Bosufan, Afrin. The attack was carried out using a 9M113 Konkurs anti-tank missile.

On 2 September, Hawar News Agency, affiliated with the Autonomous Administration of North and East Syria (AANES), reported that the HRE claimed responsibility for killing 11 SNA fighters in a series of coordinated day and night operations targeting military positions along the contact line.

On 12 September, the HRE released footage of a night raid on an SNA position, conducted using night-vision devices and other specialized equipment. The attack resulted in several SNA fighters being wounded at close range, while the assailants seized light weapons from the site before withdrawing.

=== 2022 ===
Between 12 and 17 May, the HRE conducted operations against Turkey-allied groups.

=== 2023 ===
On 18 September 2023, the SOHR reported that the HRE carried out a major operation on the outskirts of Al-Bab. With artillery support, the group infiltrated the area, killing at least 14 pro-Turkish fighters of Ahrar al-Sham, while wounding several others. The HRE confirmed the account of the SOHR but also claimed to have killed 15 instead of 14 militants.

=== 2024 ===
On 31 January 2024, the HRE attacked the Turkish controlled village of Basalhayya/Basile. The attack was conducted by multiple gunmen infiltrating the village. As a result of the attack 12 Turkish soldiers and 8 members of pro-Turkish forces were killed. 8 Turkish soldiers and 17 pro-Turkish fighters were wounded. 5 members of the HRE were killed too during the attack according to a statement released by them. The Afrin Liberation Forces also released a 2 minutes long video showing parts of the attack.

On 3 August 2024, at least five Turkish-backed militants were killed in an infiltration operation by HRE forces near the city of Afrin, according to the SOHR.

The group carried out operations between September 9 and October 9, allegedly resulting in the death of 24 SNA militants, including two Turkish soldiers, and the wounding of 13 others.

Turkey-based Bianet reported on 25 November, that heavy fighting erupted between the Sham Front and the Afrin Liberation Forces. Two Sham Front militants were killed, and two others injured.

On 27 November, the Sunni Islamist Hay’at Tahrir al-Sham (HTS) launched a major offensive on Aleppo, which ultimately led to the collapse of the Assad regime. At the same time, allied SNA and Turkish forces began Operation Dawn of Freedom, aimed at expelling the remaining encircled Kurdish forces, including the HRE, from Tell Rifaat and the wider Shahba region. The operation resulted in intense clashes between HRE and SNA units. With support of an SDF corridor along the Aleppo and Dayr Hafir axis, HRE and other Kurdish groups were able to withdraw to AANES territory and the Kurdish-held neighbourhood of Sheikh Maqsoud in Aleppo city.

=== 2025 ===
On 6 October, the group was allegedly involved in Aleppo clashes with the Syrian Transitional Government in the Sheikh Maqsoud neighbourhood of Aleppo.

== Relations to the SDF ==
While the HRE does not explicitly claim affiliation with the Kurdish People’s Protection Units (YPG) or the SDF, it operated for a long time from territories under SDF control in Shahba Canton. Given their level of training, professionalism, and sophisticated infiltration equipment, it is highly likely that many of its members are former YPG fighters. Voice of America says the HRE is "made up of the sons and daughters of Afrin."

Turkey regards the HRE as both an extension of the SDF and a terrorist organization.

== See also ==
- Wrath of Olives Operations Room
