= 2019 Tell Rifaat clashes =

Part of the Syrian Civil War

- Part of Turkish involvement in the Syrian Civil War, Operation Olive Branch and the Syrian Civil War
Date	4–5 May 2019 (1 day)
Location	Tell Rifaat Subdistrict, Aleppo Governorate, Syria
Result	SDF victory: Turkish/SNA forces capture three villages before withdrawing due to SDF shelling; Frontlines remains unchanged; TAF/SNA cancel the offensive

Belligerents
Turkey; (Syrian opposition) Syrian Interim Government	Autonomous Administration of North and East Syria Afrin Liberation Forces (HRE) (Syria) Syrian Arab Republic; Syrian Arab Armed Forces

Commanders and leaders
Unknown	Unknown

Units involved
Turkey; Turkish Armed Forces; Turkish Land Forces; Syrian National Army; Third Legion	Syrian Democratic Forces; People's Protection Units (YPG); Syrian Arab Armed Forces; Syrian Arab Army (SAA)

Strength
600–1,200	200–450

Casualties and losses
4 killed, 2 injured (per SOHR); 8 killed (per SOHR); 40 killed (per SDF)	23 killed (per Turkey)

The 2019 Tell Rifaat Clashes were a military confrontation between Turkey and allied Free Syrian Army groups against the Kurdish People's Protection Units (YPG) in early May 2019.

== Background ==
The clashes began after two Turkish soldiers were killed on May 4, 2019, in a confrontation with the YPG, and one soldier was injured. In retaliation, the Turkish Defense Ministry claimed to have killed a total of 23 YPG fighters. Following the incident, a Turkish official told Reuters that a larger operation would be launched "if necessary."

== Timeline ==
On 4 May 2019, the Syrian National Army (SNA) announced it had initiated an operation against the YPG in the villages near Tell Rifaat. The SNA initially managed to capture the three villages of Mar'anaz, Al-Malikiyah, and Shawarighat al Arz, facing little resistance. After taking the villages the SNA stated “Our aspiration is to reach Tel Rifaat and what is beyond it.” However, subsequently, due to heavy shelling by SDF as well as pro-government forces and a large number of landmines in the area, the SNA and the Turkish Armed Forces were forced to withdraw and the Kurdish-led forces recaptured all three villages.

The following day, it was reported that the offensive had been cancelled in favor of more negotiations between Turkey and Russia to set up a joint demilitarized zone in the area.

== Aftermath ==
On 18 May 2019, new fighting erupted in the Tell Rifaat area, with five rebels and one civilian being killed. On 9 June 2019, fighters of the Syrian Democratic Forces attacked Turkish troops, killing 2 soldier and wounding 7. In response, the Turkish Armed Forces responded days later with shelling.

== See also ==
- 2018 Syrian-Turkish border clashes
- 2020–2021 Ayn Issa clashes
- East Aleppo offensive (2024–2025)
- Operation Olive Branch
