= Operation Olive Branch =

Turkish offensive against the SDF in Afrin

- Part of the Rojava conflict, Turkish involvement in the Syrian Civil War, and the Kurdish–Turkish conflict (2015–present)
- Turkish-backed opposition control SDF control Syrian Army control For a more detailed, up-to-date, interactive map, see here.
Date	20 January^{[a]} – 24 March 2018 (2 months and 4 days)
Location	Afrin and Azaz districts, Aleppo Governorate, Syria
Result	Turkish-SNA victory
Territorial changes	Turkish Armed Forces and Syrian National Army capture the YPG-held Afrin District, including a total area of 2,000 square kilometres (770 sq mi) and 282 settlements including Afrin city

Belligerents
Turkey; Syrian Interim Government; Other rebel factions	Democratic Federation of Northern Syria; Syrian Arab Republic (20 Feb – 21 March); Sinjar Alliance; International Freedom Battalion (IFB); Supported by: Iran (alleged)

Commanders and leaders
(Turkey) Gen. Hulusi Akar (Minister of Defence, Army Chief until July 2018) (Turkey) Gen. İsmail Metin Temel (Operations chief commander, until December 2018); Lt. Col. Muhammad Hamadin (Third Legion and Levant Front commander) (Syrian opposition) Col. Ahmed Othman (Sultan Murad Division top commander) (Syrian opposition) Fahim Issa (Second Corps and Sultan Murad Division commander) (Syrian opposition) Sayf Bulad (Hamza Division top commander); Abu Muslim (Levant Front commander); Maj. Yasser Abdul Rahim (Sham Legion commander, until 7 February); Lt. Wael al-Mousa † (First Legion commander); Ahmad Fayyadh al-Khalaf † (Samarkand Brigade field commander)	Bahjt Abedo (Afrin Region defense minister); Mahmud Berxwedan (YPG and SDF Afrin commander) Qehreman Cudî † (YPG and SDF Afrin commander); Tokshin Botan † (YPJ commander); Zilan Judy † (YPJ commander); Haji Ahmed (Army of Revolutionaries commander); Abu Omar al-Idlibi (Northern Democratic Brigade commander); Viyan İsyan (MLKP commander) (Ba'athist Syria) Ibrahim Maktabi (NDF commander); Mohamed al Faraj (NDF commander); Muthanna Nasser † (NDF commander)

Units involved
See order of battle	See order of battle

Strength
(Turkey) 6,400 Equipment: Unknown number of F-4E 2020 Terminator; Tens of F-16 Fighting Falcon; Unknown number of Leopard 2 A4; Unknown number of M60T Sabra; Unknown number of T-155 Fırtına Howitzers; Unknown number of T-122 Sakarya Rocket Artillery; Unknown number of FNSS ACV-15; Unknown number of Kirpi APC; 2 T129 ATAK; 10,000–25,000	8,000–10,000 (late January); 20,000 (late February); 800+

Casualties and losses
Per SOHR: 616 killed (Turkey) 96 killed Per SDF: (Turkey) 2,772 killed Per Turkey: 318 killed (as of 27 March) 54 soldiers and 1 civilian worker killed, 236 soldiers wounded	Per SOHR: 1,586 killed (as of March 2019); 91 killed Per SDF: 600–876 killed 62 killed Per Turkey: 4,612 killed or captured
- 389–500 civilians killed in Syria (per SOHR & SDF)^{[b]} 7–9 civilians killed in Turkey (2 Syrians) 150,000–300,000 civilians internally displaced
- ^{a} The TAF announced the start of Operation Olive Branch on 20 January, while the Turkish Defence Minister stated it "de facto started with cross-border shelling" the day before when one additional SDF fighter was killed.

Operation Olive Branch (Turkish: Zeytin Dalı Harekâtı) was an invasion by the Turkish Armed Forces and Syrian National Army (SNA) in the Kurdish-majority Afrin District of northwest Syria, against the People's Protection Units (YPG) of the Syrian Democratic Forces (SDF). The air war and use of major artillery ended as the Arab and Turkmen militias of the SNA entered the city of Afrin on 18 March 2018.

Between 395 and 510 civilians were reported killed in the invasion. Other reported war crimes include the mutilation of a female corpse by SNA fighters, the killing of civilians due to indiscriminate shelling by Turkish forces, the alleged use of chemical gas by the Turkish Army, and the indiscriminate shooting of refugees fleeing from the conflict area into Turkey by the Gendarmerie General Command.

In Turkey, the government issued restrictions on press coverage, with Reporters Without Borders noting that the Turkish media was expected to be in "service of the government and its war goals". Hundreds of people were arrested for demonstrating against the invasion, and over 800 social media users and nearly 100 politicians and journalists were arrested for criticizing it. Turkish police also arrested numerous leaders and high-ranking members of pro-Kurdish and left-wing political parties. The use of the term 'olive branch' (a traditional symbol of peace) in the operation's name has been criticised as Orwellian and a "mockery".

The Syrian Observatory for Human Rights estimates that a total of 300,000 Kurdish people have been displaced. In the aftermath of the conflict, Turkish forces implemented a resettlement policy by moving refugees from Eastern Ghouta into the newly-empty homes. Many houses, farms, and other private property belonging to those that fled the conflict have been seized or looted by the SNA. In a study of 24 key informants from Afrin, all reported loss of housing, land or property following Operation Olive Branch. Although Turkish President Recep Tayyip Erdoğan said that the operation in Afrin would be followed by a push to the town of Manbij, which the US-backed SDF captured from the Islamic State of Iraq and the Levant (ISIL) in 2016, Turkish forces stopped a few kilometres short of the town.

== Background ==
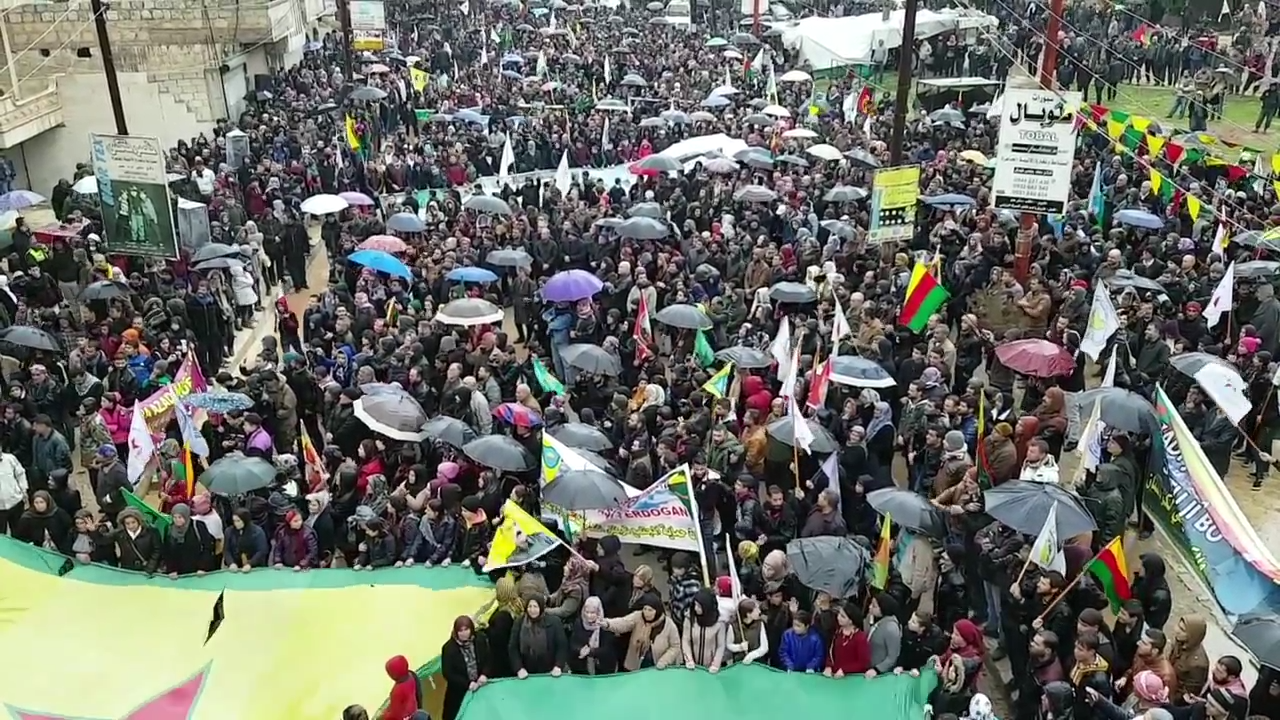
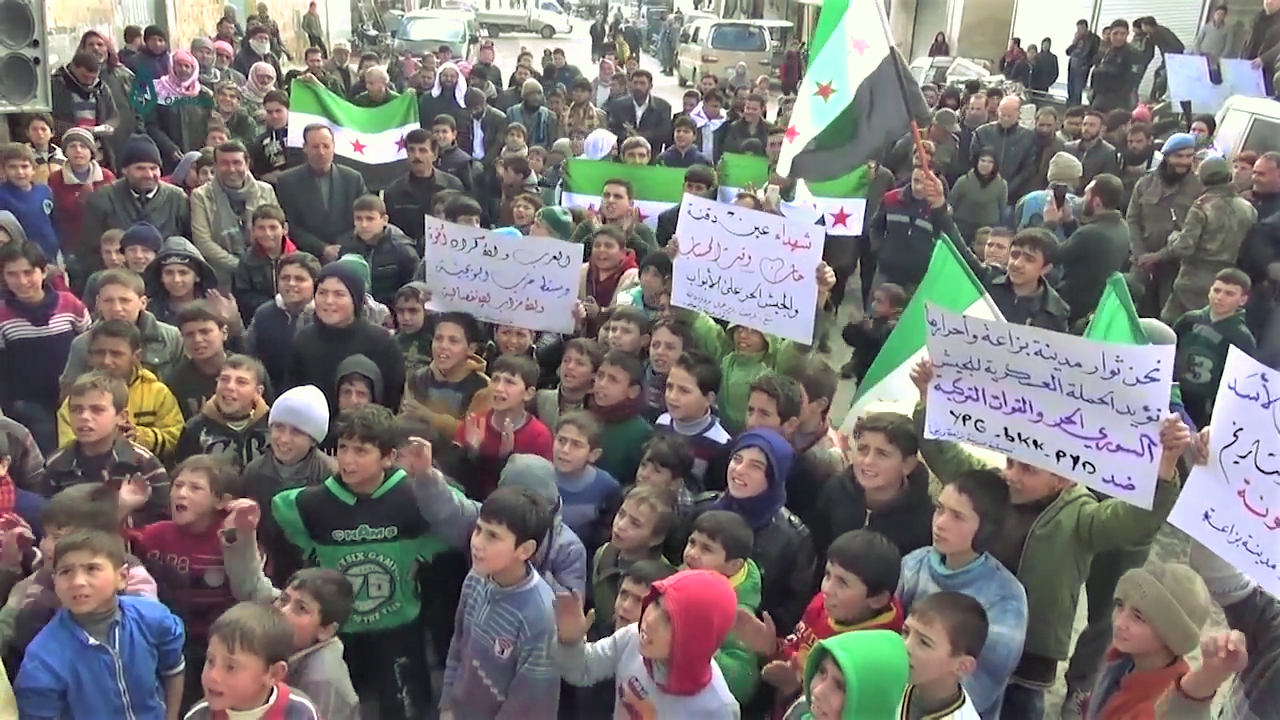
Demonstration in Afrin (top) to support the YPG and the YPJ against the Turkish military operation, and demonstration in Bizaah (bottom) to support the Turkish military operation in Afrin against the YPG and the YPJ, 19 January 2018.

After Syrian government forces pulled out of Afrin in 2012, Kurdish YPG forces took control of the territory. Afrin managed to maintain trust with both the Syrian government and its neighboring rebel groups. In February 2016, during the latter part of the Battle of Aleppo, Syrian government forces cut off the rebel supply route to Aleppo. Subsequently, the SDF moved eastward out of Afrin, and successfully attacked the rebels, capturing the Menagh Military Airbase and the town of Tell Rifaat. In response, Turkish forces shelled SDF positions across the border to protect the rebel-held city of Azaz. In 2017, Russian military troops stationed themselves in Afrin as part of an agreement to protect the YPG from further Turkish attacks.

Turkey had been fighting PKK and other groups in southeastern and eastern Turkey for several decades. The Kurdish–Turkish conflict is estimated to have cost 40,000 lives. The Turkish government has publicly stated that it does not recognize a difference between the Syrian YPG forces and PKK, and says both are terrorist organizations. While the PKK has been designated as a Foreign Terrorist Organization by the United States, the United States' position on the YPG is that it is not a terrorist organization, a stance that has generated much conflict between the two NATO allies. Despite this, the CIA named the PYD as the "Syrian wing" of the PKK in its World Factbook on 23 January 2018. On 14 February, the U.S. Director of National Intelligence described YPG as the Syrian wing of PKK in a report.

During the early stages of the operation, United States Secretary of Defense James Mattis noted that Turkey was the only NATO ally with an "active insurgency" within its borders. Mattis acknowledged that Turkey has "legitimate security concerns" regarding PKK, and said Turkey had consulted the United States prior to launching the offensive. The offensive came amid growing tension between the Turkish and American governments over the latter's support of the Syrian Democratic Forces, which are made up primarily of Kurdish fighters of the YPG, which Turkey considers to be a branch of the PKK. In particular, Turkey objected to announced plans by the US to train and equip a 30,000 strong SDF border force, which Turkey stated posed a direct threat to their security. "A country we call an ally is insisting on forming a terror army on our borders," Turkish President Recep Tayyip Erdoğan said in a speech in Ankara. "What can that terror army target but Turkey? Our mission is to strangle it before it's even born."

According to media reports with reference to sources in the Syrian Kurdish leadership, shortly before the Turkish incursion, as an alternative option, Russia proposed that the Kurdish authorities in Afrin recognise the Syrian government's control in the region; the proposal was rejected at the time.

The Afrin offensive has jeopardized the Astana Peace Process by placing the major parties—Russia, Iran, and Turkey—on opposing sides of the conflict. According to an Iranian official, Tehran has warned Ankara that "many parties might want to see Turkey stuck in a quagmire" and has advised that Turkey "try to contain this adventure". Tehran's position is that the Kurdish fighters are not acting independently, but rather are receiving support from multiple sides in the conflict.

In the days prior to the offensive, Turkey and the Turkish-backed Free Syrian Army exchanged artillery fire with YPG militants along the Turkish-Syrian border near Afrin. The YPG shelled the TFSA-held town of Azaz. The Turkish state-run Anadolu Agency reported that Russian military observers in the Afrin area began withdrawing on 19 January 2018 in anticipation of a Turkish offensive on YPG positions in Afrin.

On 12 February, Turkey's Interior Ministry added the former PYD co-leader Salih Muslim Muhammad to its "wanted terrorists" list along with several new names and offered money for information on his whereabouts. On 25 February, Salih Muslim was detained in Prague at Turkey's request. The Turkish Deputy PM Bekir Bozdağ said that Turkey is requesting Muslim's extradition. However a Czech court released Muslim. The Turkish Deputy PM said this was "a move in support of terror".

== Composition of forces ==
=== Turkey and allied Free Syrian Army ===
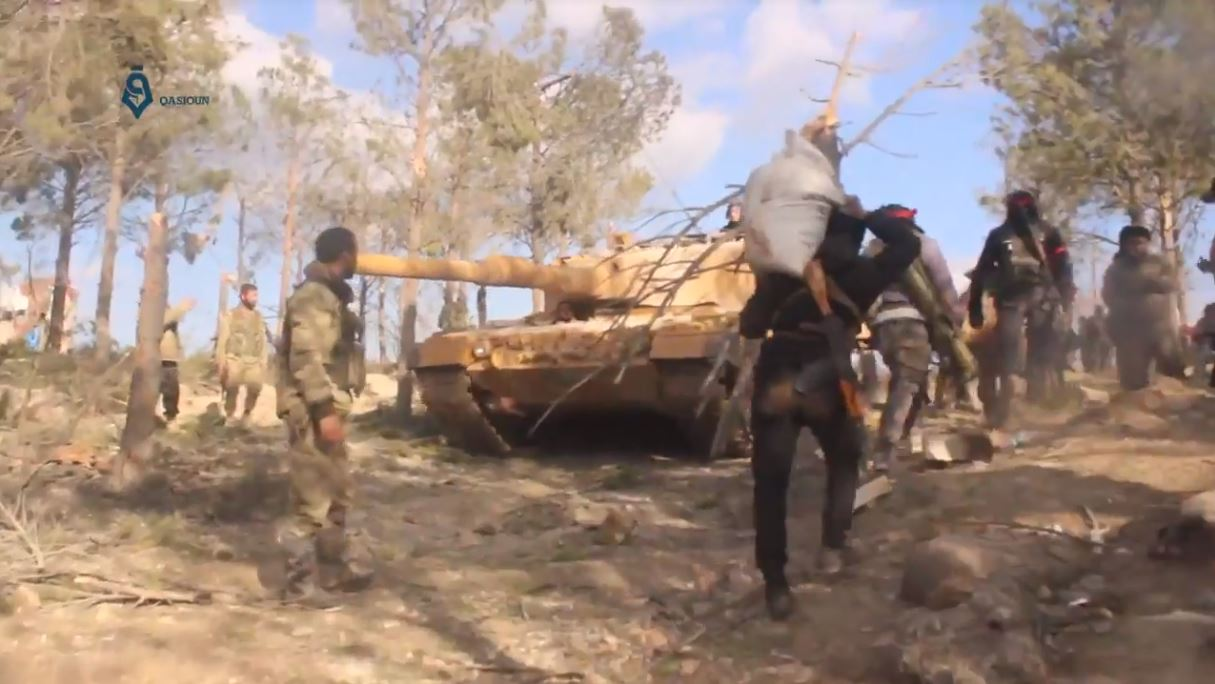
Free Syrian Army fighters and a Turkish tank on Mount Barsa ("Barṣāyā")

The largest group is between 10,000 and 25,000 Syrian Arab and Turkmen rebel fighters operating under the banner of the Syrian Interim Government and trained and supported by Turkey. The second largest group is 6,400 soldiers from the Turkish Armed Forces along with armored and air force support. Sunni Islamist rebels were also seen fighting alongside the Turkish-backed forces, including Ahrar al-Sham and Sham Legion.

In addition, The Independent reported that Turkey had a contingent of ex-ISIL fighters within the ranks of its allied military during the assault on Afrin. Several Jihadist fighters among the Turkish-backed forces released a video threatening to cut off the heads of Kurds whom they consider "infidels". A video clip surfaced on the Internet which showed several TFSA Jihadists singing praise of previous battles that they've fought including Tora Bora (former headquarters of Osama bin Laden), Grozny, and Dagestan and then concluding: "And now Afrin is calling to us". The Syrian Observatory for Human Rights also stated that members of the Grey Wolves, a Turkish fascist, ultranationialist extremist organisation, fought alongside the pro-Turkish forces in Afrin.

=== Democratic Federation of Northern Syria ===
The DFNS forces include the Syrian Democratic Forces with the Kurdish-led Democratic Union Party's armed wing, the People's Protection Units (YPG), Afrin Region regional defense and police forces. There have been reports that some of the YPG fighters in Afrin were child soldiers. The DFNS was also supported by foreign fighters, including Iraqi fighters of the Sinjar Alliance, troops of the International Freedom Battalion, and PKK fighters. In addition, Syrian pro-government forces entered the conflict on the side of the DFNS in February 2018. It is not clear how many government loyalists eventually fought in the operation; a YPG commander said that 4,000 militiamen were planned to enter Afrin, though only about 500 were confirmed to have fought alongside the SDF. According to Kurdish officials over 20,000 fighters rallied to defend Afrin.

Haaretz reported that US-backed Kurdish forces received aid from Syrian President Bashar al-Assad after Kurds requested that Damascus send reinforcements to protect Afrin's border. In response to the request, the Syrian government allowed Kurdish fighters, civilians and politicians to enter Afrin, including fighters from Kobani and Jazira. For much of the conflict the Syrian government and Kurdish forces have avoided one another; however, in the months leading up to the conflict Damascus began threatening to retake parts of North and Eastern Syria that had been captured by the US-backed SDF and even launched an attack against Deir al-Zor, which was met by coalition airstrikes.

In late January, there were multiple reports that Western foreign fighters, including Americans, British, and Germans among others, had moved into Afrin to aid its defense against Turkish-led forces. On 12 February, 2 foreign fighters, French citizen Olivier François Jean Le Clainche and Spanish citizen Samuel Prada Leon were killed in Afrin. On 24 February, Icelandic activist Haukur Hilmarsson, who was fighting on the behalf of YPG, was killed in a Turkish airstrike in Afrin. On 9 March 3 Turkish citizen foreign fighters belonging to MLKP were reportedly killed in Afrin. On 15 March, a Briton named Anna Campbell was reportedly killed in Afrin.

Following the end of open combat and the start of the insurgency, three new groups emerged which said to fight against the pro-Turkish forces in Afrin: The "Afrin Falcons", the "Afrin Liberation Forces", and the "Wrath of Olives" operations room; they disavowed any connection to the YPG. The groups openly declared to "liquidate all the traitors dealing with the Turkish occupation". A Middle East security analyst said that these were front organizations for the YPG, as the latter was "under pressure from the United States to disassociate itself from the most controversial assassinations in Afrin."

== Afrin offensive ==
=== Initial TFSA-Turkish advances ===
The Turkish government announced the start of the offensive on 19 January 2018, with Turkish Defence Minister Nurettin Canikli stating, "The operation has actually de facto started with cross-border shelling." He added no troops had crossed into Afrin. Turkey intensified its shelling later, while People's Protection Units (YPG) stated that 70 shells had been fired overnight. On 20 January, after days of shelling, Turkish fighter jets carried out air strikes on the border district targeting positions held by the PYD and YPG groups.

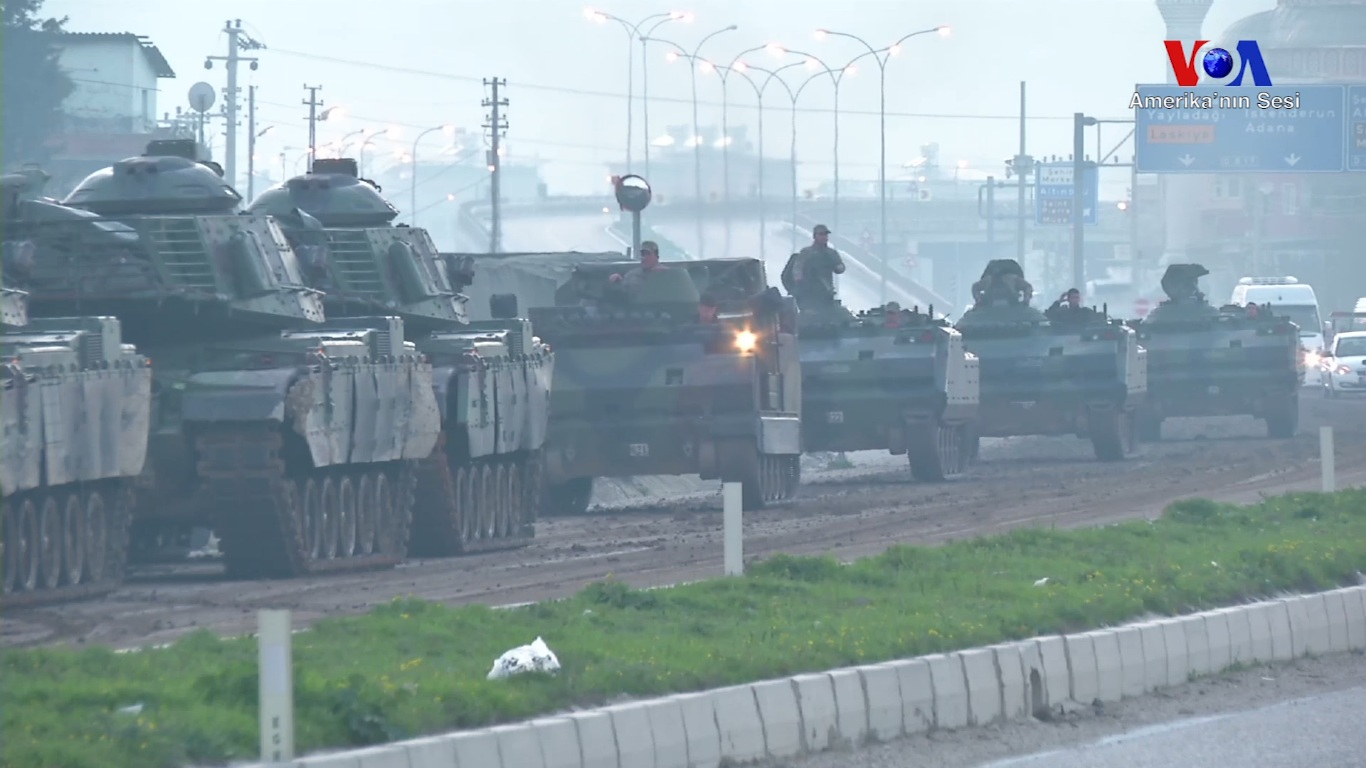
Armoured vehicles of the Turkish Army on the road to Afrin.

Turkish media reported that 20 buses carrying Turkish-backed Syrian opposition rebels had crossed into Syria through the Öncüpınar border crossing. An AFP photographer stated that 30 buses carrying Syrian fighters had also crossed through the Cilvegözü border crossing.

On 20 January, the pro-PYD Hawar News Agency reported that fighters of the Army of Revolutionaries in the Shahba Canton killed 4 Syrian National Army (SNA) fighters and wounded 5 others in a response to the recent mortar and artillery bombardments of civilian areas. YPG forces fired rockets on Turkish border towns Kilis and Reyhanli, where at least one civilian was reported killed and a number of others wounded. Turkey announced that its airstrikes had hit 150 targets in Afrin.

The Turkish General Staff made the announcement in a statement published on its website, saying the objective of the mission is to "establish security and stability on our borders and region, to eliminate terrorists of PKK/KCK/PYD-YPG and ISIL." On 21 January 2018, Turkish state media reported that Turkish ground forces had begun to move into Afrin. and had advanced up to 5 kilometres (3.1 mi) into the territory. SOHR reported that Turkish troops had clashed with Kurdish militias on the northern and western borders of Afrin and entered the towns of Shankil and Adah Manli to the west.

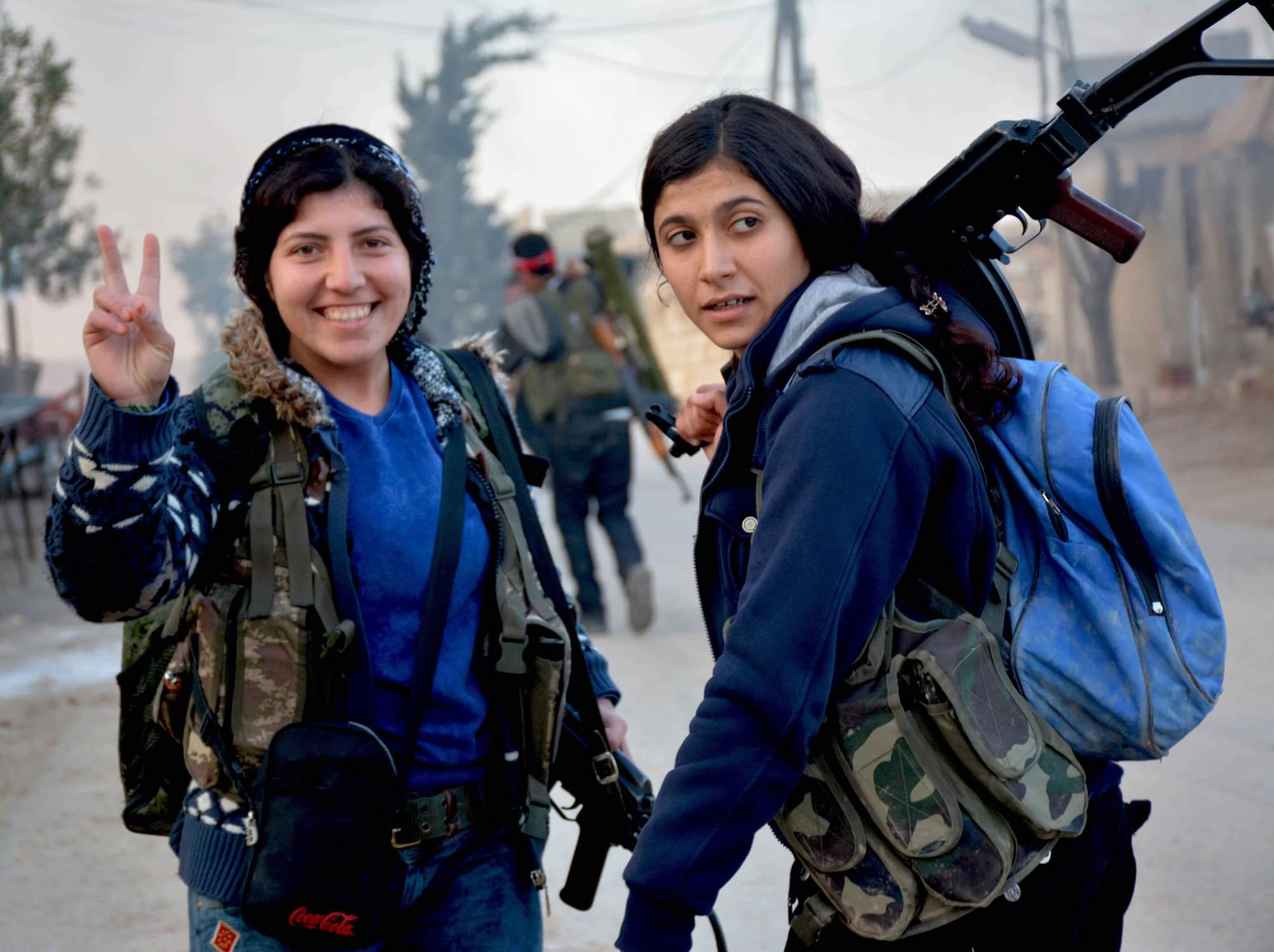
Women's Protection Units (YPJ) fighters in the Afrin Region during the operation.

By 22 January 2018, Turkish forces announced the capture of seven villages, although the YPG recaptured two. The same day, the first Turkish soldier was reported killed in the fighting. By 23 January, territorial gains of the pro-Turkish forces were still "limited". Both sides said to have inflicted numerous casualties on each other, including a high-ranking TFSA commander, amid the back-and-forth fighting for several strategic points at the border. Meanwhile, about 5,000 civilians had fled the Turkish advance in the contested areas, relocating into the central areas of Afrin Region.

On 27 January, in the first case of a Kurdish suicide attack against Turkish forces, female Kurdish YPJ fighter Zuluh Hemo (a.k.a. "Avesta Habur") reportedly threw a grenade down the turret of a Turkish tank, destroying the tank and killing two Turkish soldiers and herself. The reported attack took place during fighting in the village of al-Hammam. The Turkish military denied that any Turkish soldiers had been killed or injured in the incident, and also said that Hemo blew herself up with a grenade in her mouth.

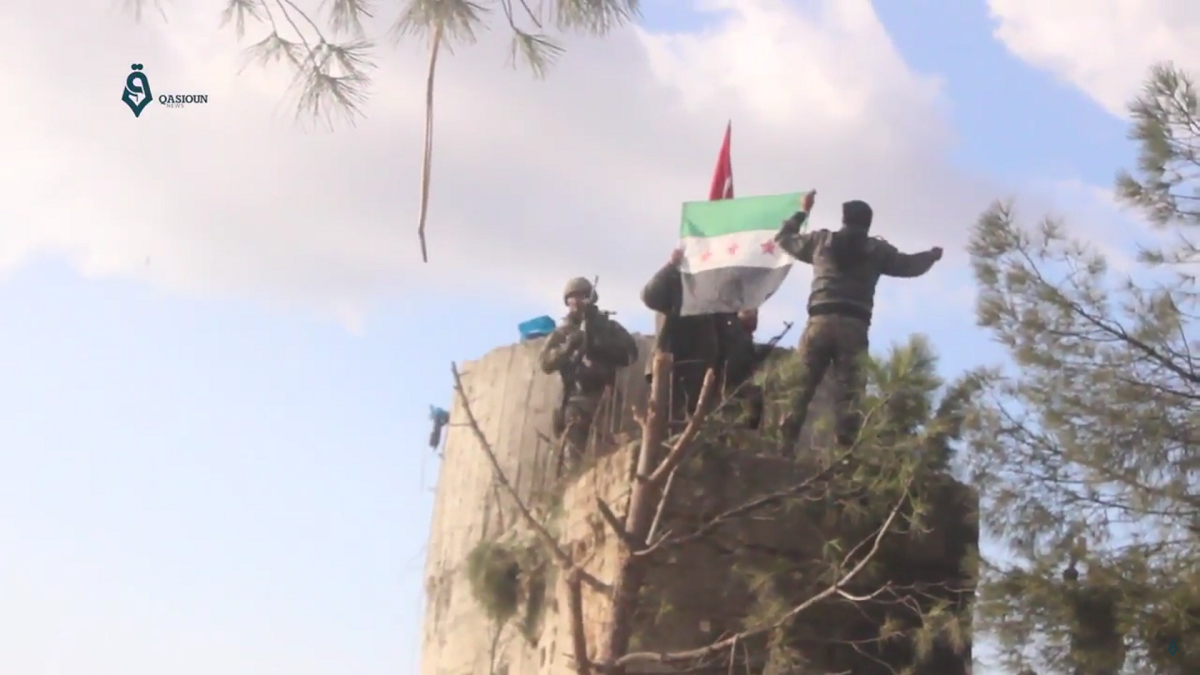
TFSA fighters hoist the Turkish flag and the Syrian independence flag on the top of Barsaya mountain.

On 28 January, pro-Turkish forces achieved their first major victory by capturing the strategic Barsaya mountain after several previous attacks on the mountain since 22 January failed due to Kurdish resistance. According to Kurdish reports, Kurdish fighters once again pushed back the Turkish-led forces from the mountain the following day, although Turkey disputed this, with Turkish commander Lt. Gen. İsmail Metin Temel, who was leading the operation, reportedly visiting Barsaya.

At the start of February, some rebel factions fighting on behalf of the Turkish army reportedly withdrew from Afrin in order to fight the Syrian army.

On 3 February, a Turkish Leopard 2 tank was destroyed by a YPJ Anti-tank guided missile (ATGM) team northeast of Afrin city. Five Turkish soldiers reportedly died in the attack.

On 6 February, a convoy from the eastern parts of SDF-controlled Northern Syria carrying YPG as well as Yazidi YBŞ and YJÊ fighters passed through government-held territory and arrived in the city of Afrin after an agreement for the transfer was approved by Damascus. Their number was unclear, but estimates ranged from 500 to 5,000. There had been reports that the agreement, as well as a recent halt in Turkish airstrikes on the Afrin region, was approved after the Turkish troop deployment in the Aleppo province and the downing of a Russian Su-25 by rebels in the Idlib province, located close to Turkish troops on 3 February. A commander among the pro-Syrian government forces also said that the army had deployed air defenses and anti-aircraft missiles to the front lines near Turkish positions, covering the airspace of northern Syria including Afrin. According to Turkish sources, Russia temporarily closed Syrian airspace to Turkey to establish an electronic defence mechanism against the shoulder-launched missiles since the night of 4 February. According to the report, Turkish armed drones can still operate in Afrin.

On 9 February, the Syrian airspace was reopened for Turkish jets. On 10 February, a Turkish T129 ATAK attack helicopter crashed with both crew members being killed. According to Turkish President Erdoğan, the SDF, and SOHR, the helicopter was shot down. The Turkish Prime Minister also confirmed that a helicopter had been downed, while the Turkish military did not give a cause for the crash but stated an investigation was being conducted. The SDF on 17 February claimed a cross-border attack on Turkish forces and its allies in Kırıkhan. Turkish media had reported two Turkish soldiers and five Syrian rebels being wounded when a police station was hit by mortar fire in Kırıkhan.

=== Entry of pro-Syrian government forces ===
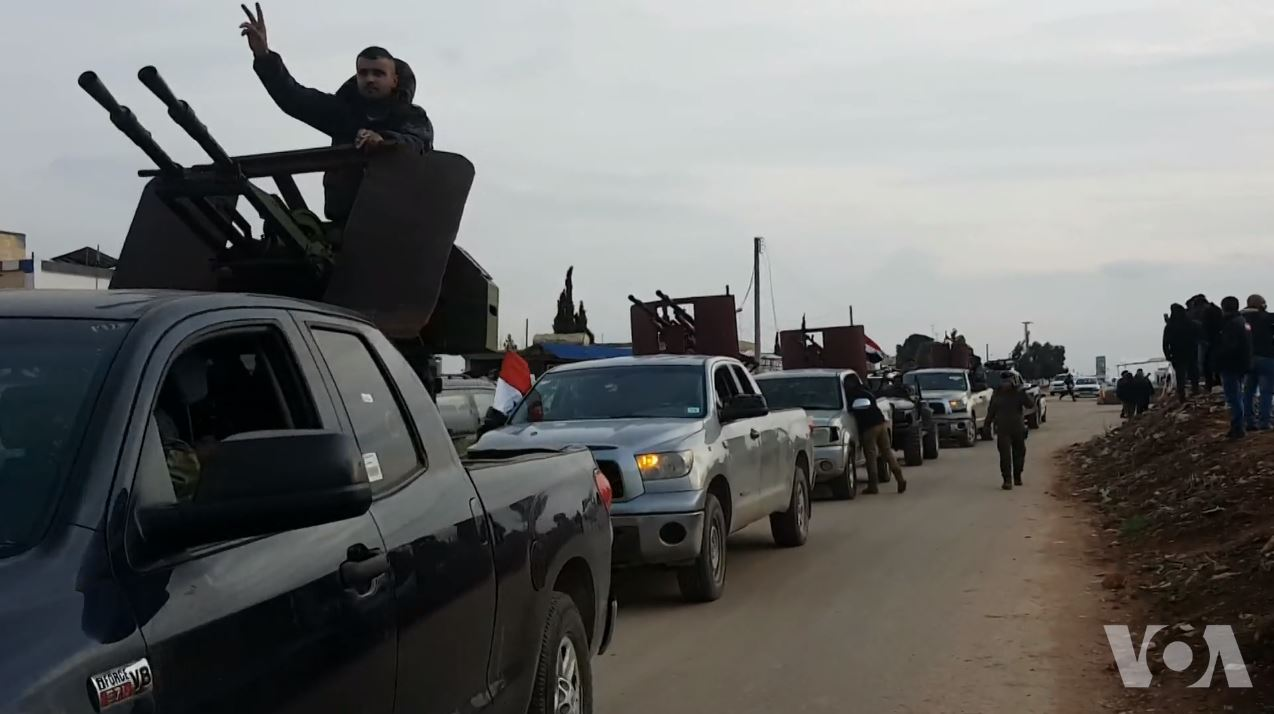
Syrian pro-government militias arrive in Afrin District

On 19 February, Syrian Arab News Agency (SANA) reported that the Syrian government had reached a deal with the YPG in Afrin. Turkish FM Mevlüt Çavuşoğlu responded that they welcomed Syrian forces if they wanted to fight the YPG, stating, "If so, there is no problem. However, if they are entering [Afrin] to protect YPG/PKK, nobody can stop the Turkish army". Nuri Mahmoud, a YPG spokesman, told Al-Jazeera that they had called upon pro-Syrian government forces "to preserve a united Syria" but added they hadn't arrived yet. However, a while later, Nuri denied they had reached an agreement with the Syrian government.

On 20 February, Turkish President Erdoğan stated that Turkey had thwarted the possible deployment of pro-Syrian government forces into the Afrin area after talks with Russian President Vladimir Putin. Meanwhile, Russian Foreign Minister Sergei Lavrov said that the situation in Afrin could be resolved through direct dialogue between Damascus and Ankara. On the same day, TFSA linked the Bulbul area with Azaz, after capturing the Deir al-Sawan village.

Later on 20 February, pro-Syrian government militias calling themselves the "Popular Forces" entered YPG-held Afrin. The Baqir Brigade, part of the Local Defence Forces (LDF) militia network, announced that it would be leading those forces. A convoy of pro-Syrian government troops entered the region to support the YPG, but was hit by Turkish forces, who fired "warning shots". Anadolu Agency stated that pro-Syrian government troops withdrew 10 kilometres (6.2 mi) from Afrin town because of the warning shots. SANA confirmed Turkish artillery involvement but didn't mention any retreat. President Erdoğan said that the militias were repelled by Turkish artillery, adding that the convoy consisted of "terrorists" who acted independently. He also stated, "Unfortunately, these kind of terror organizations take wrong steps with the decisions they take. It is not possible for us to allow this. They will pay a heavy price."

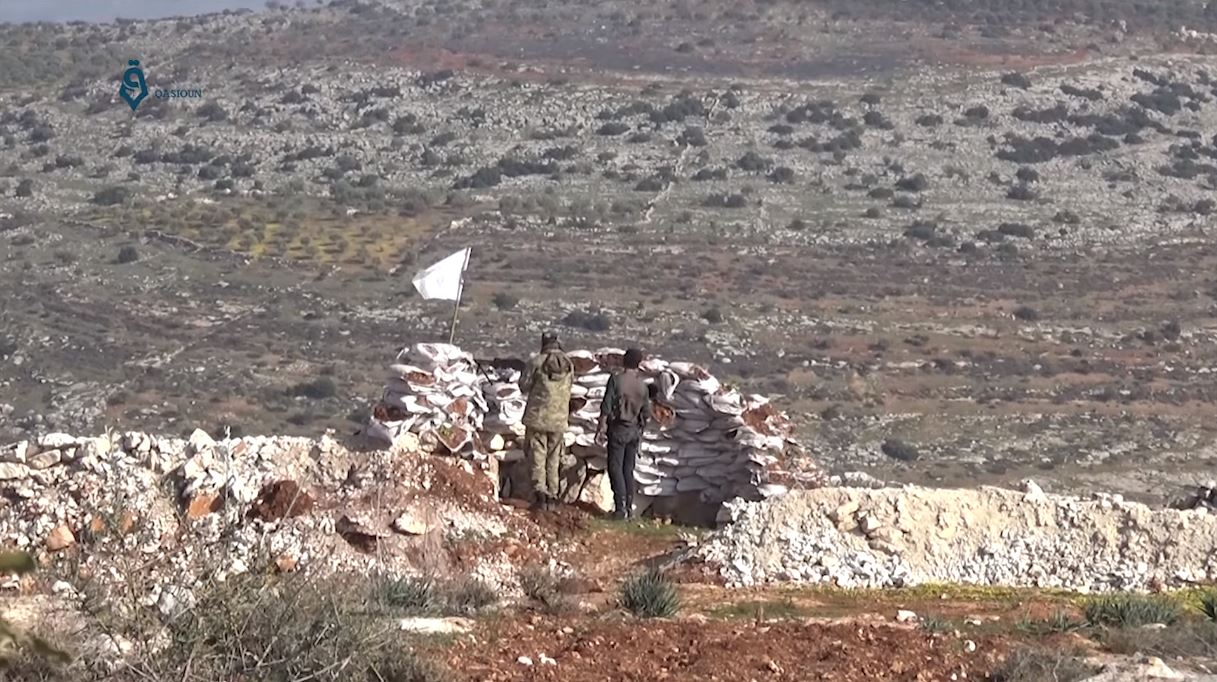
Fighters of the 23rd Division, a TFSA member group, man observation points near Afrin, February 2018

Ex-PYD co-chair Salih Muslim Muhammad meanwhile denied any political agreement with the Syrian government, stating the agreement about Afrin was purely military. The Syrian state media on 21 February announced the arrival of more pro-Syrian government forces. A commander of an alliance fighting for the Syrian government stated that pro-government militias in Afrin had retaliated after being attacked by Turkish-backed rebels during the preceding night.

By 26 February, the YPG had been pushed back from most of the border with Turkey. During the day, Deputy Prime Minister Bekir Bozdag announced the deployment of police special forces in Afrin for a new battle. The Turkish government stated on 28 February that the United Nations' recent Syrian ceasefire resolution didn't cover Afrin, and that Turkey wasn't a part of the Syrian conflict. On the next day, the SOHR reported that Turkish forces and its allies had taken complete control for the border, which was also confirmed by Turkish media. Meanwhile, Turkish forces were fighting to capture the towns of Jandairis and Rajo.

=== Encirclement of Afrin city ===
The TAF stated on 1 March that eight Turkish soldiers were killed, while 13 were wounded in clashes. SOHR reported that Turkish airstrikes in the village of Jamaa killed 17 pro-government fighters overnight. Doğan News Agency stated that a Turkish helicopter evacuating wounded had to return when it was hit. 36 militiamen belonging to the NDF were killed in Turkish airstrikes two days later on a camp in Kafr Jina, per SOHR.

A day-by-day map of the Turkish military operation in Afrin

On 3 March, the Turkish-led forces said they had captured Rajo, one of the major Kurdish strongholds in western Afrin. It was reported that Turkish-led forces quickly breached its defenses and captured it in an hour. However, SOHR reported that the town was still contested, although the TFSA had captured 70 percent of it. The TFSA/TSK also stated the capturing of six villages, including two on the Jinderes district axis, as well as the Bafilyun mountain west of Azaz, making quick gains in recent days. The next day, Rajo was still under heavy Turkish bombardment as the TFSA was attempting to take full control of the town. The SDF confirmed pro-Turkish forces had entered the town and that clashes were continuing during the morning. Later in the day, the SOHR reported large parts of Rajo were captured, while the TFSA had also entered Shaykh al-Hadid. On 5 March, Rajo was confirmed by the SOHR to have been captured by the TFSA. After the capture of Rajo the TFSA also captured the notorious "black prison" near Rajo, which was known to be used by the YPG to jail and torture Kurdish dissents as well as anti-Assad activists and rebels.

On 6 March, the SDF announced that it had shifted 1,700 personnel from their frontlines in the Middle Euphrates river valley in Deir ez-Zor to Afrin. Between 8 and 9 March, the Turkish Army, alongside the TFSA, captured Jandairis and the Afrin Dam, reaching the outskirts of Afrin on 10 March. On 12 March, Turkish Forces had severed the water supply to the city of Afrin, and also cut off the city's Internet access.

By 13 March, Turkish troops announced they had now surrounded the city later confirmed by the UK based human rights group, the Syrian Observatory for Human Rights (SOHR). On the next day, seven people were killed in Turkish shelling on Afrin. Between eight and ten pro-government fighters were killed in Turkish airstrikes to the south of Afrin.

By then, SDF troops had moved into Afrin from other areas, including retreating troops from the unsuccessful defence of Jinderes, and dozens of international volunteers, reinforcing the troop numbers there, and preparing defences. By Mid March, civilians started arriving in the city, organising themselves as human shields in anticipation of the attack while another 2,000 civilians fled the city, in advance of the Turkish troops.

=== Capture of Afrin city ===
On 15 March, Turkish artillery bombardment against the city increased, with 12 people killed and 60 injured. Food shortages were reported in the city, with long queues at bakeries. Turkey allowed people to exit the city through the one remaining road, with about 10,000 people exiting the city. Turkey started dropping flyers on the city on 15 March, urging the Kurdish and allied fighters to give up, and asking civilians to stay away from "terrorist" positions. Turkish artillery fire continued on the next day, killing another 16 people. Meanwhile, the YPG claimed a Turkish airstrike hit the main hospital in the city - the only functioning hospital - resulting in 16 civilians dead. The hospital had already been inundated with injured people from the region, fleeing Turkish advances. However, Turkish drone footage released the next day allegedly showed the hospital intact.

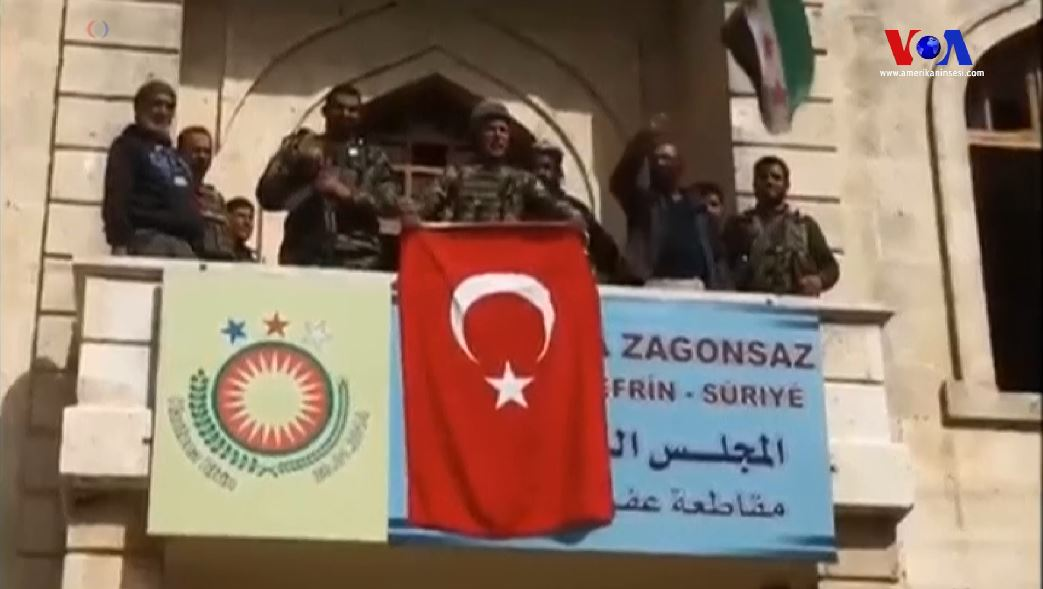
Turkish soldiers and TFSA fighters at the building in Afrin that had hosted the PYD-led government of the region, 18 March 2018

On 17 March, Turkish and TFSA forces started their ground attack on the city. They met light resistance and penetrated to the center of the city. Most of the population had left, and rather than engaging the Turkish forces, most of the SDF had retreated, leaving only a small resistance effort behind. On 18 March, TAF forces posted pictures from the center of the city, which appeared to be largely empty. Turkish troops initially shot at, and then removed with a bulldozer, a statue of Kawa, a legendary Kurdish figure, in the center of the town, and raised Turkish flags throughout the city. The city was captured with minimal losses by the TAF and minimal losses by the SDF in their withdrawal. SDF troops had withdrawn to government-held areas, or to SDF areas east of the Euphrates. SDF troops had been ordered to withdraw, though a few minor pockets refused orders and stayed to combat the Turkish forces. The UN High Commissioner for Human Rights Zeid Ra’ad Al Hussein said of the capture: "In the city of Afrin, which was captured by Turkish forces yesterday, scores of civilians have been killed and injured due to airstrikes, ground-based strikes, and explosive hazards, and thousands have been displaced."

After the capture of Afrin, which had been deserted by most of its residents, Turkish-backed fighters then began stealing vehicles and goods, looting the homes, businesses, and political and military sites. In response to these events, the Turkish military and allied TFSA units, including the Syrian Interim Government's Military Police, set up checkpoints in front of the city, and arrested several looters. Some battalions of the TFSA's 3rd Corps were disbanded due to their participation in the thefts. The Levant Front announced that they dismissed 52 of its members, due to assault on the properties of civilians.

== Aftermath and SDF insurgency ==
After the Turkish-led forces captured Afrin District in early 2018, they began to implement a resettlement policy by moving Arab refugees from southern Syria into the empty homes that belonged to displaced locals.

The border crossing between Afrin and Turkey reopened in November 2018.

On 18 November 2018, the Turkish Army and Turkish-backed rebel factions launched an operation against a group named al-Sharqiya Martyrs of about 200 fighters who were reported to disobey and commit abuses. A rebel commander named Mahmoud ‘Azazi was killed on 19 November and a mass rebel surrender took place on the same day. The clashes left 25 fighters dead.

=== Turkish stabilization efforts after the capture of Afrin city ===
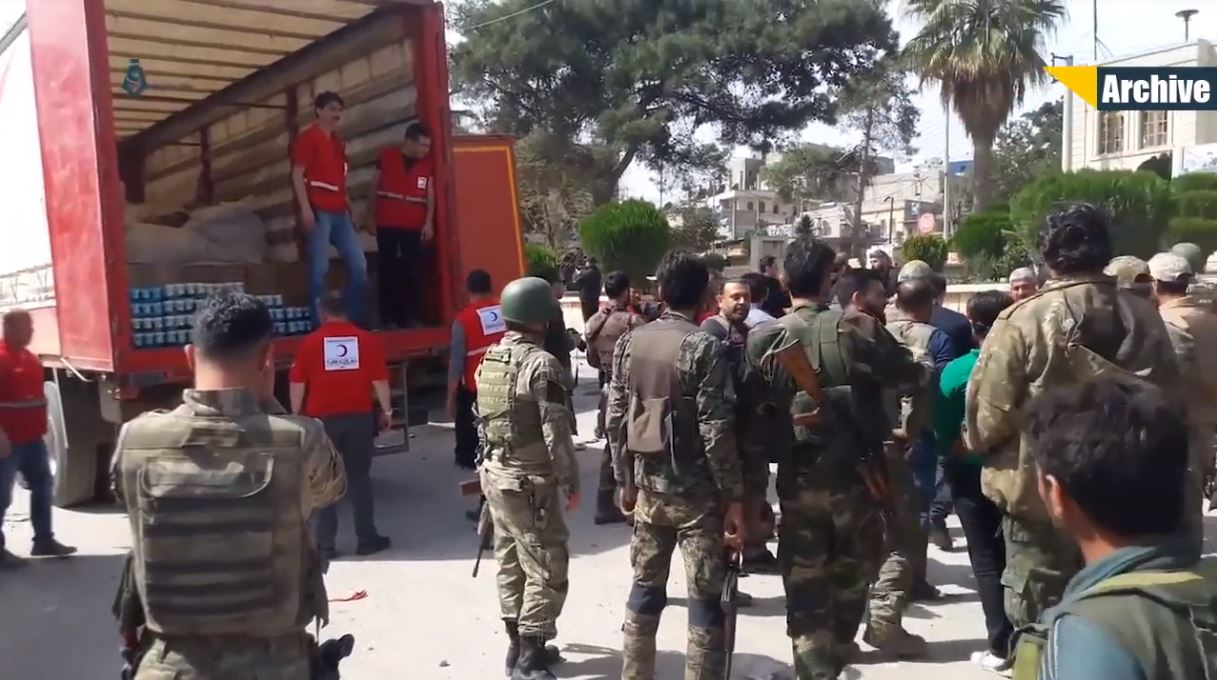
TFSA fighters and Turkish soldiers in Afrin city, while the Red Crescent distributes aid to the local civilians

Soon after Afrin city had been captured, Turkey began to consolidate its control over the entire district through a number of policies. The Turkish-backed forces pushed back the Syrian government loyalists: On 21 March, the Turkish Air Force launched airstrikes against pro-government forces located in towns of Kimar and Barad. By the evening, the TFSA had captured the two settlements, advancing within few kilometres from Nubl and Al-Zahraa. Furthermore, Turkish President Erdoğan announced that the operation would only achieve its goal by taking Tell Rifaat, and rebuked a Russian demand to return Afrin to Syrian government control, saying "When the time comes, we will give Afrin to the people of Afrin personally, but the timing of this is up to us, we will determine it, not Mr. Sergei Lavrov." These actions were in line with the Turkish policy to prevent the Syrian government from retaking the Turkish-occupied territories in Syria.

Furthermore, Turkey organized a number of local councils to serve as civilian government of Afrin District, with the one for Afrin city composed of Kurdish, Arab, and Turkmen civilian representatives. Though the Turkish government closely works with these councils, they generally operate as autonomous entities and are supposed to help restoring civil society, as Turkey followed a "hands-off approach to governance and policing". The councils helped to demine Afrin city, as the SDF had left a disputed number of mines behind while leaving the city. One YPG commander said that his troops had not placed any explosives "within cities or residential areas", while TFSA officials estimated that the YPG had left "tens of thousands" of hidden mines behind. The pro-Turkish Afrin Civil Council later stated that mines had killed about 250 civilians in Afrin city by May 2018, though this was not independently verifiable. These efforts meant that Afrin city had been stabilized to some degree by May, with displaced civilians returning and municipal services resuming. With the support of the Turkish government and the stabilization committee, the local council in Afrin was able to fix the engines of Meydanki Dam, and was able to pump water to the desalination plant in the town of Sharran, to provide drinkable water for residents of Afrin and the city of Azaz.

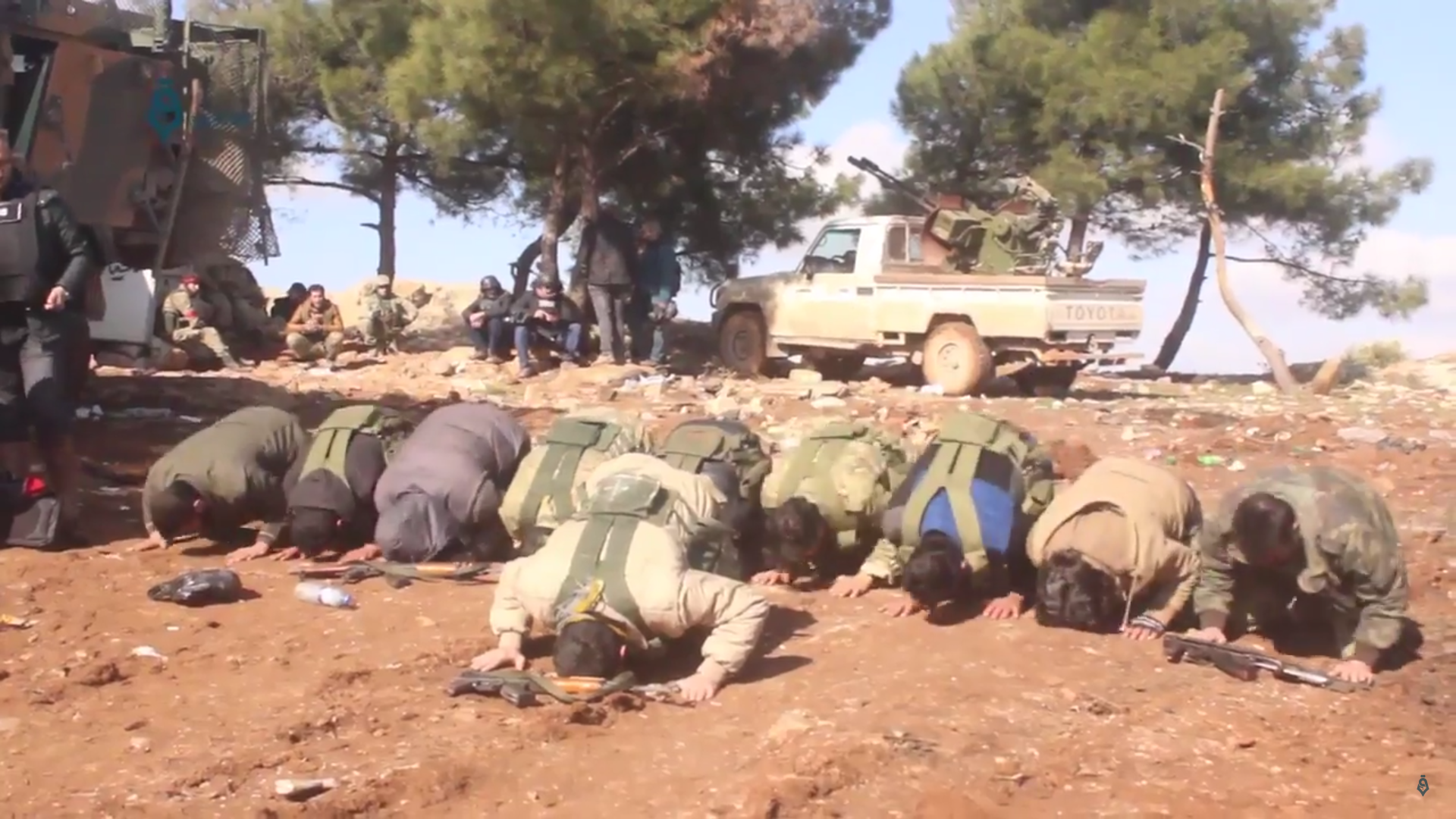
Free Syrian Army fighters praying after capturing Mount Barsa. The conservative values of the Turkish-backed FSA fighters caused tensions with many "leftist-minded" Kurdish civilians.

Turkey has also implemented more contentious policies, however, as it began to resettle TFSA fighters and refugees from southern Syria into the empty homes that belonged to displaced Kurdish and Yazidi locals. Though some Kurdish militias of the TFSA and the Turkish-backed civilian councils opposed these resettlement policies, most FSA units fully supported them. Many were also critical of the deeply conservative and religious policies of the TFSA units. There were other locals, however, who approved of the new government, considering it less harsh and ideologically charged than the previous PYD government.

=== YPG guerrilla campaign ===
A PYD spokesman had already announced shortly after the capture of Afrin city that the SDF would continue to fight the pro-Turkish forces using guerilla tactics. On 4 May, the YPG also declared that they would target the family members of rebel fighters active in Afrin region, as well as refugees that were settled in Afrin. The "Wrath of Olives" operation room was established in early summer, 2018. The YPG has denied being affiliated with this group, which has been active all over Turkish-held Syria.

Aftermath of the July 2018 VBIED attack on Jarabulus that wounded over 10 people. Various groups were accused of being the preparators, including the YPG, but also ISIL and Syrian government loyalists.

By May 2018, an insurgency had broken out in Afrin District, as YPG holdouts and allied militants, calling themselves the "Afrin Falcons", were carrying out bombings, ambushes and assassinations against the Turkish army, the TFSA, and civilian sympathizers. The insurgents were aided in their attempts to destabilize the Turkish-led rule over Afrin by the unrest that still dominated the area. Hostilities remained high between mostly Kurdish natives and largely Arab refugees who had settled in the region after the occupation, while several TFSA groups continued to cause security problems. Despite Turkish attempts to train and disciplined them, these militias sometimes violently clashed with each other and terrorized the local civilians. A TFSA vehicles was seen with portraits of Saddam Hussein, who had committed a genocide against Iraqi Kurds. Kurds in Afrin said this was an attempt to humiliate suspected PKK members.

By mid-2018, the insurgency was mostly focused on the rural areas and Afrin city's outskirts, where Turkish Air Force bombarded YPG holdouts in early May and early July. In early May, the YPG killed the former leader of the Free East Ghouta Police, Jamal al-Zaghloul, whose forces had been tasked with police duties in Afrin after the occupation. He was killed by a mine in al-Basouta, south of Afrin city. Following his death, the YPG stated that "anyone in cooperation with the invasion forces is our target". On 26 August, the YPG published a video of the assassination of an al-Rahman Legion commander, Abu Muhammad Al-Shmali, in Babili.

The insurgents also carried out a smaller number of urban bombings in the Turkish occupation zone. On 27 June, a twin bombing targeted Afrin's city center which killed nine people, injuring several others, with the Kurdish Afrin Falcons group claiming responsibility, stating that the group has no affiliation with any other Kurdish military or political groups and that its "struggle was independent". Other major bombings occurred in Jarablus on 7 July (seven wounded), al-Bab on 8 July (several killed), and again in Afrin's city center on 22 August (at least one killed). It is not always clear, however, who is responsible for the bombings, with ISIL remnants and Syrian government loyalists also being suspected of carrying out some attacks. By the end of August, 108 rebels and Turkish soldiers were reportedly killed in Kurdish guerrilla attacks. As of early September, attacks were taking place in the forests in the outskirts of Afrin city.

By January 2019, about 220 insurgent attacks had been documented since late March 2018 in the Afrin area, most of them carried out by official YPG forces, as well as the Wrath of Olives operations room and Afrin Liberation Forces. The latter had also acquired anti-tank guided missiles. One researcher noted that the rebels might be operating "with the acquiescence" of the Syrian government. On 18 February 2019, a Turkish soldier was killed during "ongoing operational activities" in the Afrin area. In response to the continued insurgency, Turkey and its allied militias launched a military operation against the Tell Rifaat Subdistrict which was jointly held by the SDF and Syrian government and considered a base for YPG guerrilla attacks. In course of the subsequent clashes on 4 May 2019, pro-Turkish troops initially captured a few villages, but were pushed back by SDF and Syrian government counter-attacks. The operation was then cancelled due to new Turkish-Russian negotiations about the fate of the Tell Rifaat Subdistrict. Frequent insurgent attacks against the TFSA and the Turkish military continued until early August 2019.

In October 2019, in retaliation for the Turkish offensive into north-eastern Syria, the YPG attacked a Turkish military outpost in Afrin, and two Turkish soldiers were killed in the mortar attack. Subsequently, starting in early December 2019, sporadic insurgent attacks restarted against Turkish forces in the Afrin region.

On 28 April 2020, a bombing in Afrin killed 40 people, including 11 children. No group claimed responsibility. Turkey blamed the YPG for the attack. According to the head of the British-based Observatory for human rights in Syria, at least six pro-Turkish Syrian fighters were among those killed in the blast with a possibility of increase in the death toll. At least 47 people were reported injured, according to Al Jazeera. The explosion was believed to have been caused by the rigging of a fuel tanker with hand grenades, the governor of Hatay province of the neighboring Turkish border stated. Many people, alongside those who got trapped in their cars were burnt to death as a result of the blast, Syrian activists disclosed.

== Casualties ==
Various casualty estimates were made during the operation. The Syrian Observatory for Human Rights documented 1,586 SDF (as of March 2019) and 616 TFSA fighters were killed, as well as 91 pro-Syrian government militiamen, and 389 civilians. It also reported 96 Turkish losses, though was imprecise as to whether these losses were dead or injured. The SCWM site reported the death of 798 SDF and 696 TFSA fighters, 61 Turkish soldiers, 51 pro-Syrian government militiamen and 564 civilians by 26 April 2018.

Turkey stated that 4,612 SDF fighters were killed or captured. Pro-Turkish sources also reported the deaths of 318 TFSA fighters, 54 Turkish soldiers, one civilian worker and 7–9 civilians in Turkey. According to the SDF, 2,772 TFSA fighters and Turkish soldiers were killed, while they themselves lost 600–876 fighters. The SDF also reported 500 civilians and 62 pro-Syrian government militiamen were killed. British national Anna Campbell was killed fighting for the Kurdish forces in Afrin.

According to a pro-Syrian government and pro-Shia based news, the Turkish operation displaced 167,000 people as of 23 March 2018, up from 5,000 people in January 2018. Between 50,000 and 70,000 civilians still remained in Afrin city.

== Human rights violations ==
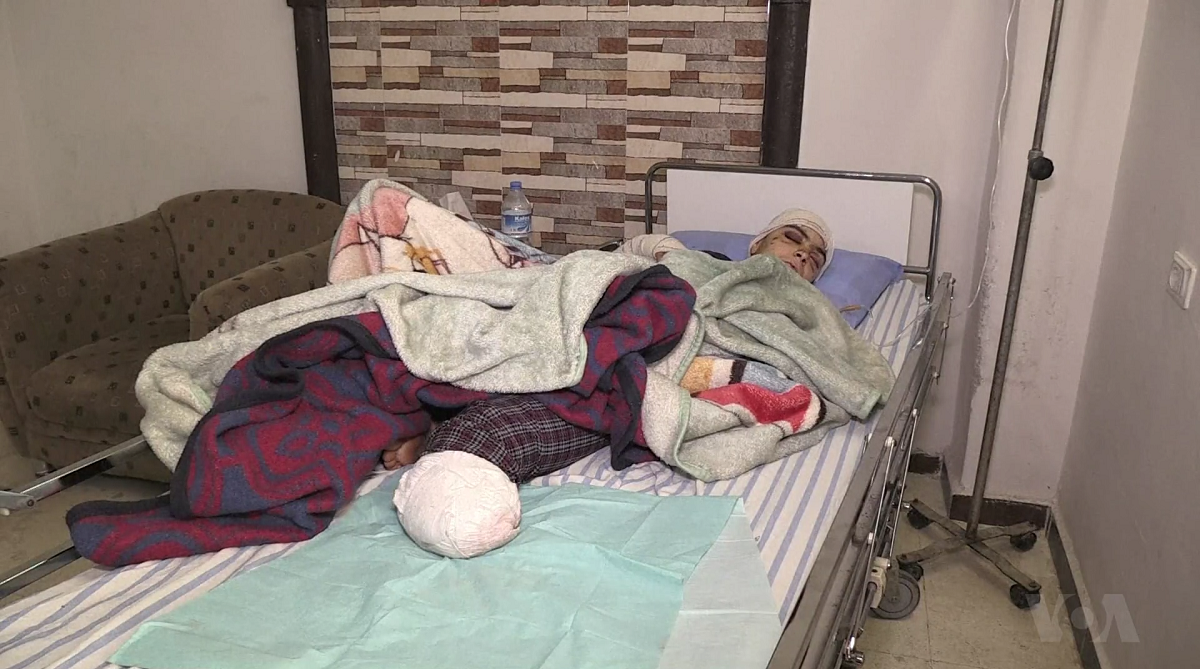
A civilian wounded by Turkish airstrikes on Afrin.

=== Turkey ===
Human Rights Watch (HRW) has criticized Turkey for having "failed to take necessary precautions to avoid civilian casualties" in several instances during the offensive. The report specifically cited three attacks which left 26 civilians dead of which 17 were children. Lama Fakih, the deputy Middle East director at HRW, stated: "It appears that vulnerable civilians are facing displacement and death because of the way Turkey's latest offensive is being conducted." The HRW noted that such attacks have been conducted near farms, homes, and civilian shelters. The HRW stated that such attacks are a violation of international law: "Turkey should thoroughly investigate these strikes, make the findings public, and provide adequate redress to civilian victims or their families. It should hold to account those responsible for violations of international humanitarian law arising from the attacks."

According to HRW, Turkish border guards have been indiscriminately shooting at refugees attempting to flee the conflict zone into Turkey. The deputy Middle East director at the HRW said: "Syrians fleeing to the Turkish border seeking safety and asylum are being forced back with bullets and abuse." Several witnesses who were asylum seekers affirmed that they were beaten, suffered abuses, and were denied medical care. The official statement from the HRW calls on Turkey to "respect the principle of nonrefoulement, which prohibits rejecting asylum seekers at borders when that would expose them to the threat of persecution, torture, and threats to life and freedom. Turkey must also respect the right to life and bodily integrity, including the absolute prohibition on subjecting anyone to inhuman and degrading treatment."

Videos emerged on social media which showed Turkish soldiers stepping on and kicking the corpse of a YPG fighter. More videos on social media then emerged, including one such video that showed Turkish soldiers beating a Kurdish civilian while questioning him.

Less than a week after the operation began, Redur Xelil, a senior SDF official, said that at least 66 civilians had been killed by aerial and artillery bombardment by Turkish forces, and accused Turkey of committing war crimes. Amnesty International reported that civilians were being killed by the Turkish Army due to indiscriminate shelling of civilian areas, an act that is in violation of international law. According to Amnesty, the situation "painted a grim picture" throughout numerous villages in Afrin, within which civilians were subjected to indiscriminate shelling that lasted for hours. Amnesty also reported the shelling by the YPG of Azaz, though these actions were to a lesser extent. Lynn Maalouf of Amnesty International stated: "The use of artillery and other imprecise explosive weapons in civilian areas is prohibited by international humanitarian law and all parties should cease such attacks immediately."

Syrian news media outlets and Kurdish fighters stated that Turkish forces were bombing schools. The SOHR also stated that Turkey had bombed the main water plant of the city of Afrin, which supplies water to more than 100,000 civilians. Sixteen civilians were reported dead when Turkish forces bombed the only hospital in Afrin city. Those killed included two pregnant women. Turkey denied the reports. Turkish drone footage released the next day showed the hospital intact.

On 16 February, YPG forces stated that Turkey was using chemical gas attacks that wounded several people in Afrin. The SOHR then confirmed the incident and added that there were several individuals who had difficulty breathing and had dilated pupils. Also, Syrian state news agency SANA, citing a doctor in an Afrin hospital, mentioned the incident. Turkey later denied usage of chemicals, calling the accusations "baseless".

On 22 February, Syrian government news outlets stated that Turkey was bombing humanitarian aid convoys that were on their way to Afrin. As a result, the Syrian Arab Red Crescent stated that they had suspended all aid convoys to Afrin because it was unsafe for them to head there. On the same day, a video surfaced that showed Turkish backed rebels executing a civilian driving a farm tractor. This was followed by another video by the same group that showed a summary execution of six civilians, including one woman near Jendires. In another bombing in the same area, Kurdish militia claimed that Turkish air strikes had killed 13 civilians, including several children.

=== TFSA ===
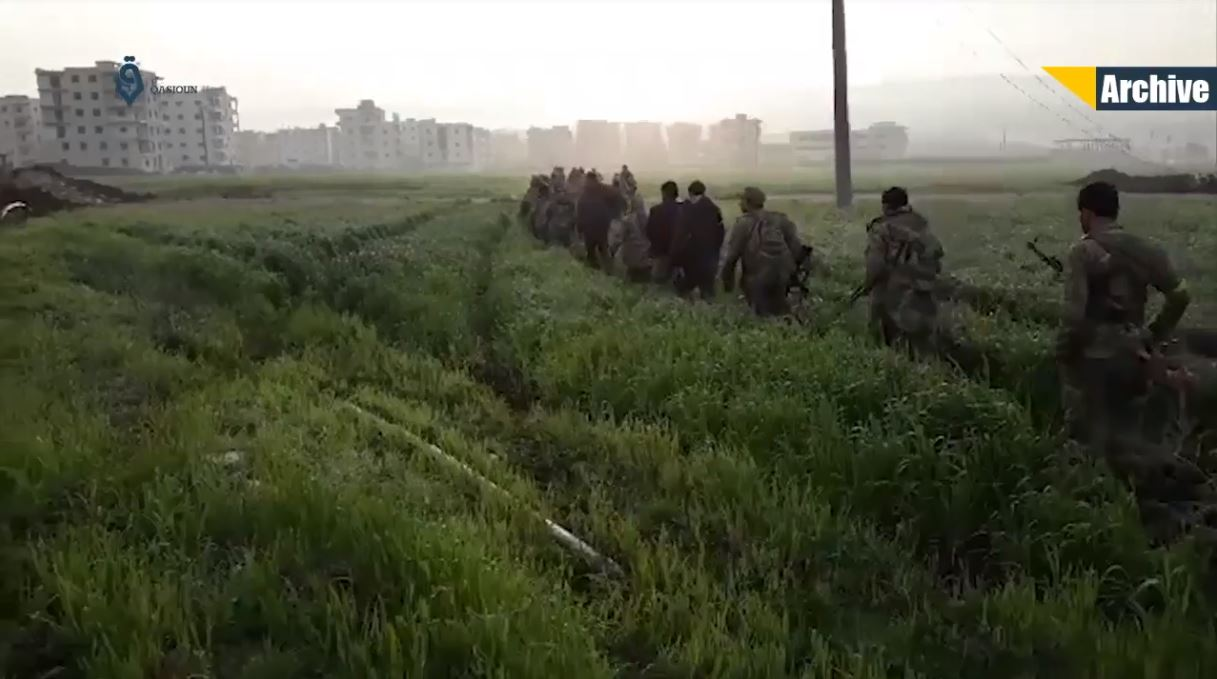
TFSA rebels advance towards a city during the Afrin offensive.

Several videos emerged showing Turkish-backed Syrian militants mutilating the bodies of YPG fighters. One such video showed the mutilated body of a dead female YPG fighter with her breasts cut off. Turkish-backed Free Syrian Army (TFSA) fighters who appear in the video call the female fighter a "female pig" and are heard saying "shame on them for sending women to fight". They are shown in the film stepping on the female YPG fighter's breasts. The TFSA said that it will investigate allegations that its fighters mutilated the corpse of a female member of the YPG.

The Independent stated that Turkish allied forces were forcibly converting Yazidis, a Kurdish-speaking religious minority, to Islam and destroying Yazidi places of worship after capturing their villages.

=== YPG ===
The human rights organization Geneva Call stated that the YPG has been recruiting child soldiers during Operation Olive Branch. Geneva Call also stated that it had received "a worrying number of allegations on the use of child soldiers" by the YPG, even though the latter had previously signed an agreement to protect children in conflict zones. While pro-Turkish media reiterated these statements, with Daily Sabah stating that the YPG/YPJ had kidnapped children to use them in the defense of Afrin, the YPG denied all statements. SDF officials have claimed that child soldiers are only 16-18 and do not serve on the frontlines, which is a similar arrangements to states like the UK who avoid the ban on under-18 military recruitment through a treaty reservation.

The United Nations reported that civilians were prevented from leaving the city of Afrin by the YPG/YPJ, and were at "high risk" of being "killed, injured, besieged, used as human shields or displaced as a result of the fighting."

== Damage to archaeological and cultural sites ==
On 24 January 2018, a rocket was fired from inside Syria, hitting the 17th century Çalık Mosque in Kilis, Turkey. The explosion killed two people who had been in the mosque for prayers and injured 11. The dome of the mosque was destroyed.

On 28 January 2018, Syria's antiquities department and the SOHR, said that Turkish shelling had seriously damaged the ancient temple of Ain Dara at Afrin. Syrian government called for international pressure on Turkey "to prevent the targeting of archaeological and cultural sites". Satellite imagery has shown that more than half of the temple is destroyed. Turkish Armed Forces denied the report.

On 18 March, Turkish-backed Free Syrian Army militants toppled a statue of Kawa, a Kurdish mythological figure, during the capture of Afrin city.

On 23 March 2018 reports stated that Turkish airstrikes destroyed many important archaeological buildings including the Julianus Church, which is one of the oldest Christian churches in the world, in the Barad ancient Christian heritage site near Afrin, which has been in UNESCO's world heritage list since 2011. On 24 March, the Turkish government denied the reports.

== Economic consequences ==
Turkish PM said that Turkey's economy would not be affected by the operation. However, on 7 March, Moody's Investors Service downgraded Turkey's debt, warning of an erosion of checks and balances under the leadership of President Recep Tayyip Erdoğan and saying that the Afrin offensive, having strained ties with Washington and drawn the country deeper into the Syrian civil war, had added an extra layer of geopolitical risk.

In January 2019 Kurds stated that Turkey was stealing olive crops from Afrin. Turkey has admitted taking the olives, explaining: "We do not want revenues to fall into PKK hands". One of the Kurdish-led groups that has attacked the Turkish forces in Afrin calls itself "Wrath of Olives".

== Reactions in Turkey ==
In Istanbul, the offices of Peoples' Democratic Party (HDP) was attacked when supporters of the operation vandalized the building and wrote sexist and racist writing on the walls.

Turkey's Directorate of Religious Affairs called all mosques on Turkey to read Quran’s chapter 48 on conquest (Al-Fath) and invited community to pray for Turkish soldiers.

Rising anti-American sentiment has also occurred since the start of the operation. A poll conducted in Turkey during the operation revealed that 90 percent of respondents believed that the United States is "behind" the PKK and YPG.

A poll by pro-Turkish government A&G company found that 90% of Turkish respondents expressed support for the operation. The poll also had 89% of respondents viewing the PYD as a threat.

=== Groups in Turkey ===
The Nationalist Movement Party (MHP), Good Party, Republican People's Party (CHP), Patriotic Party and Democrat Party all supported the intervention, while the Peoples' Democratic Party (HDP), Turkish Communist Party and the Labour Party opposed the intervention.

While the CHP supported the operation, both its leader Kemal Kılıçdaroğlu and deputy leader Öztürk Yılmaz expressed concern at the involvement of the Syrian National Army, with Yılmaz accusing the SNA of being al-Qaeda. In response, Erdoğan and other AKP officials defended the SNA and accused Yılmaz of supporting the YPG.

Less than a week after the operation began, İsmail Kahraman, the Speaker of the Grand National Assembly in Turkey and deputy of AKP, called for an open jihad in Afrin. He said: "Look, we are now in Afrin. We are a big state. Without jihad, there can be no progress, one cannot stand on their feet." When on 7 March a HDP deputy criticised the government for planning "ethnic cleansing" in Afrin, deputies of the governing AKP party physically attacked their HDP colleagues in parliament, leaving two HDP deputies injured.

On the website of the Armenian Patriarchate of Constantinople it is written that Turkish Armenians are praying for Turkish soldiers "who are fighting against terrorists". Yetvart Danzikian, the editor-in-chief of Turkish-Armenian Agos newspaper in Turkey, asserted that it is wrong to state that the Armenians support the Patriarch. He added that there are "strong nationalists winds" in Turkey and going against the operation would lead to arrest and imprisonment. In a letter, addressed to President Erdoğan and published by Turkey's Hürriyet daily, the Greek Orthodox Patriarch, Bartholomew I of Constantinople, has also lent his support to the Turkish military operation. Hürriyet's report is reproduced by Greek media, some of which stress, however, that the letter is not uploaded in the Ecumenical Patriarchate's official website.

The Turkish Medical Association stated that the war could end in large-scale human tragedy to which Erdoğan responded by calling the doctors of the association "filth", "agents of imperialism", and "terrorist lovers". The Turkish interior ministry then opened an investigation into the association. At least eleven doctors were then arrested. Erdoğan stated that the association will lose its "Turkish" tag in its official name and clarified that the organization "will not be able to use the notion of Turkishness, nor the name Turkey." He then added: "This institution has nothing to do with Turkishness and nothing about them is worthy of the notion of Turkishness."

On 19 March, a group of at least seven students at Boğaziçi University conducted an anti-war protest to which Erdoğan responded by saying that the students were "terrorists" and "communist, traitor youth". He then started an investigation into the students and threatened to expel them from the university. He added: "we won't give these terrorist youth the right to study at these universities." The president of Boğaziçi University claimed that the protesters had assaulted the participants of a commemoration event on the campus for fallen Turkish soldiers and said their action was "an attack on freedom of expression". Days later, an additional fifteen students were arrested following the incident.

The Turkish Football Federation (TFF) supported the military operation as well. A TFF delegation which included its chairman Yıldırım Demirören and two trainers of national teams visited the town of Kilis. The Football clubs Besiktas and Galatasaray, both from Istanbul have expressed their support for the military campaign.

=== Media reactions ===
Turkish mainstream newspapers featured front page titles such as "We said we would strike despite the US and Russia. We struck the traitors", "We hit them in their den", "Iron fist to terror, olive branch to civilians", and "Our jets hit Afrin. Turkey's heart beats as one" from the Sözcü, Sabah, Habertürk, and Hürriyet newspapers respectively. İbrahim Karagül, editor-in-chief of the pro-AKP Yeni Şafak, wrote that the US is the real enemy and that it has a plan to "divide and destroy Turkey" by allying itself to PKK and ISIS. He called for the Incirlik Air Base to be shut down as "since the Syria war started, terrorist organizations are being controlled from this base." He also remarked that if it is not closed down "there will come a time when thousands of people surround and siege the İncirlik Base."

The Turkish Radio and Television Corporation (TRT World) reported that Free Syrian Army "has captured a weapon from the YPG, which is thought to have been supplied to the SDF by the United States."

A newscaster who worked for Akit TV, a television channel that is a part of Yeni Akit, a conservative and Islamist Turkish news outlet that supports the AKP and has close ties with President Recep Tayyip Erdoğan, resigned after threatening to kill civilians that lived in Turkey's secular neighborhoods in response to accusations of the civilians being killed in Afrin by the Turkish army. Andrew Gardner, Amnesty International's senior adviser on Turkey, stated that there has been an "alarming" increase of similar rhetoric in Turkey. In an interview with Al Jazeera, Gardner added: "But inciting to violence is something different and it is on the rise in Turkey. This is harmful for human rights and harmful for the society."

=== Media restrictions in Turkey ===
Turkish government ministers ordered the Turkish press to follow a 15-point list of "expectations" for reporting on the conflict, which included not mentioning attacks on civilians or protests against the operation, relying on Turkish government statements and ignoring statements by "domestic arms of the PKK", which include the Peoples' Democratic Party (HDP), ignoring any protests against the Afrin operation, and keeping in mind "national interest" and "patriotic journalism". Journalists were admonished not to "report news that boosts the morale of the PKK/PYD". Reporters without Borders notes that the goal of these directives is to essentially "put the Turkish media at the service of the government and its war goals." On 21 January Erdoğan warned that anyone in Turkey protesting against the operation would pay a "heavy price." Erdoğan then added: "Know that wherever you go out on the streets our security forces are on your necks."

In a 1 March 2018 report titled "No one in Turkey dares report accurately on the war in Syria", The Economist assessed that "the climate of fear, the ongoing state of emergency and the nationalist zealotry unleashed by the coup have made objective coverage of the war in Afrin impossible" and pointed to arrest as "the weapon of last resort" as well as a "nuanced system of incentives and sanctions". As of 23 January 2018, at least 24 journalists writing columns against the operation had been arrested in Turkey. In addition to the arrest of journalists, hundreds of known arrests occurred of social media users who criticized the operation. The Anadolu Chief Public Prosecutor's Office said that the posts were violations of the following crimes proscribed by articles of the Turkish Penal Code, including Article 301, which prohibit insulting public officials or the president, degrading the Turkish nation, and spreading terrorist propaganda.

During a news segment on Turkish Radio and Television Corporation (TRT), a newscaster is now being investigated by TRT's news division after she stated on air that civilians died due to Turkish bombardment. The news division stated: "After this sad mistake, our speaker has immediately been withdrawn from the air, and a new friend was assigned to replace her. Also, an investigation has been launched against our speaker."

=== Restrictions of free expression and arrests in Turkey ===
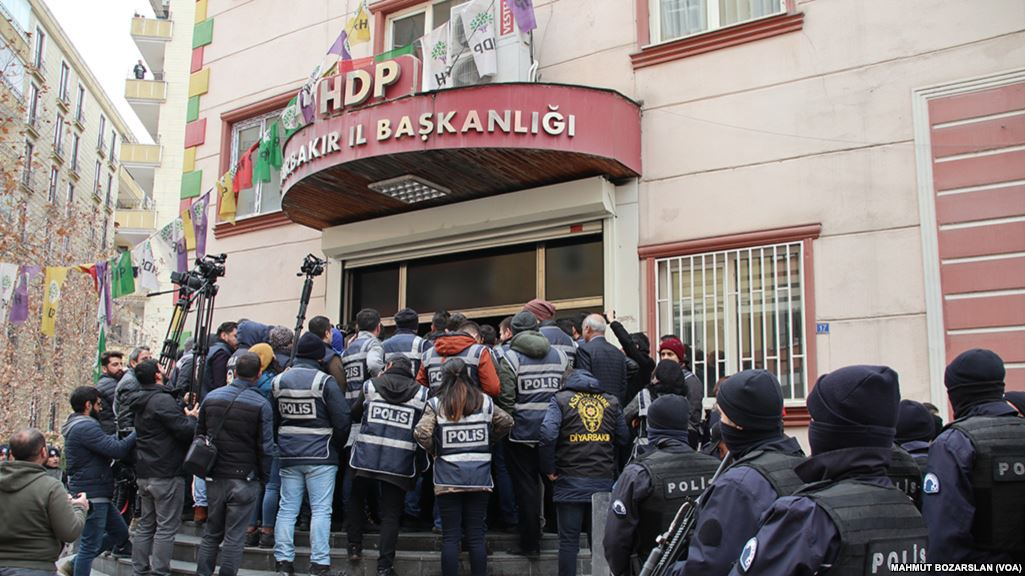
Police in Diyarbakır raided the local offices of the pro-Kurdish Peoples' Democratic Party (HDP), 21 January 2018

After the Turkish Medical Association stated that "every clash, every war, causes physical, psychological, social and environmental health problems and causes human tragedy", they were issued arrest warrants against 11 board members of the Turkish Medical Association for spreading terrorist propaganda.

Turkish authorities have arrested numerous leaders and high-ranking members of pro-Kurdish and left-wing political parties. On 6 February 2018, Mehmet Arslan, co-leader of the Democratic Regions Party, has been arrested for criticizing the operation. Days later, more have been arrested which include Onur Hamzaoğlu, a spokesman for the Peoples' Democratic Congress (HDK), Musa Piroğlu, chairman of the Revolutionary Party, Naci Sönmez and Eylem Tunceli, Co-Chairs of the Green Left Party (YSGP), Fadime Çelebi, Deputy Chair of the Socialist Party of the Oppressed, Kezban Konukçu, spokeswoman for the Socialist Solidarity Party, and Ahmet Kaya, co-chair of the Socialist Refoundation Party (SYKP). More arrests occurred on 19 February when dozens of politicians and journalists were arrested overnight including provincial heads of several Turkish cities that belong to the HDP. Among those arrested also included members of the Human Rights Association (IHD) and leaders of the Democratic Society Congress, a pro-Kurdish NGO.

Turkey has detained over 800 people for social media posts and protesters who opposed the offensive. Mevlüt Çavuşoğlu, the Foreign Minister of Turkey, called those who criticize the operation as being nothing but "Marxists, communists, and atheists" who are no different from the YPG. Prime Minister Binali Yildirim stated that those social users who make posts that criticize the operation or depict the military incursion as an attack on Kurds would be considered the "biggest villainy". In May 2019, eleven members of Turkey's leading medical association were imprisoned for criticising the invasion.

On 19 February 2018, Turkish authorities announced that all protests, meetings, rallies, and concerts held in Turkey's capital Ankara will be prohibited for the duration of the operation.

In regards to the arrests, Hugh Williamson, the Europe and Central Asia director at Human Rights Watch, said: "Detaining and prosecuting people for tweets calling for peace is a new low for Turkey's government." He then added, "Turkish authorities should respect people's right to peacefully criticize any aspect of government policy, including military operations, and drop these absurd cases."

== Reactions in Syria ==
=== Syrian government ===
The Syrian Foreign Ministry on 20 January condemned "the Turkish aggression against the town of Afrin", calling it "an inseparable part of Syria". President of Syria Bashar al-Assad denounced the Turkish invasion as terrorism, saying "Turkey's aggression in the Syrian city of Afrin cannot be separated from the policy pursued by the Turkish regime since the outbreak of the Syrian crisis and built on support for terrorism and various terrorist groups".

On 19 March, after the capture of the city of Afrin by the Turkish forces, Syria's foreign ministry demanded that Turkey immediately withdraw from Afrin, saying in two letters sent to the UN Secretary-General and the President of the UNSC that Turkey's occupation of the city was "illegal and contradicts the principles and purposes of UN Charter and international law." Among other things, the Syrian foreign ministry said: ″As part of the crimes committed by the Turkish army forces, including the ethnic cleansing policy, the properties of the citizens have been looted, their homes destroyed and many of them were detained.″

On 6 April, at the Non-Aligned Movement mid-term ministerial conference in Azerbaijan, Syria's permanent representative to the United Nations Ambassador Bashar Jaafari said that "Turkey has to withdraw its troops from Afrin. I am hoping that there will be pressure on Turkey to this end", adding that Syria expects Turkish troops to withdraw from Syrian soil as part of the trilateral mechanism created among Russia, Turkey and Iran: "Turkey's Afrin operation is a military aggression which violates the UN Security Council resolutions concerning Syria as well as the principles of the Non-Aligned Movement."

=== Other regional actors ===
- (Syrian opposition) Syrian National Coalition supported the joint operation of the Syrian National Army and the Turkish Armed Forces, considering it as continuation of the struggle against "the tyrannical regime and its allied Iranian terrorist organizations." The Coalition called Kurdistan Workers' Party, People's Protection Units, and Democratic Union Party "terrorist organizations," and urged to remove "their danger from Syria." The Syrian Coalition emphasized that "elected local councils will take on the administration of the freed towns and villages away from the authority of terrorist groups and the status quo they sought to establish."
  - Syrian Turkmen Assembly: Emin Bozoğlan, ex-council head of the assembly stated: "We were informed that the terror group PYD/PKK will transfer its arms to Raqqa, where they used to work with regime forces for years." He also said Turkey should "definitely" take necessary measures in this regard.
  - Kurdish National Council: KNC condemned the Turkish military operation in Afrin. In a statement on 22 January, the KNC "categorically rejected" the SNC statement supporting the operation, stating that the SNC statement was released without consultation with the KNC. The KNC also demanded a halt to Turkish bombing and military operations in Afrin. YPG also stated that Russia is a "partner of bloodshed" with Turkey in Afrin.
- The YPG stated that "they will respond to the Turkish provocation since civilians have been attacked". General Command of YPG in Afrin stated: "We know that, without the permission of global forces and mainly Russia, whose troops located in Afrin, Turkey cannot attack civilians using Afrin airspace. Therefore we hold Russia as responsible as Turkey and stress that Russia is the crime partner of Turkey in massacring the civilians in the region."
- Syrian population in Idlib Governorate: the local population denounced the move of rebel troops to serve Turkey in its focus on Afrin while the Syrian government led an active and successful offensive against rebel groups in the region.

== International reactions ==
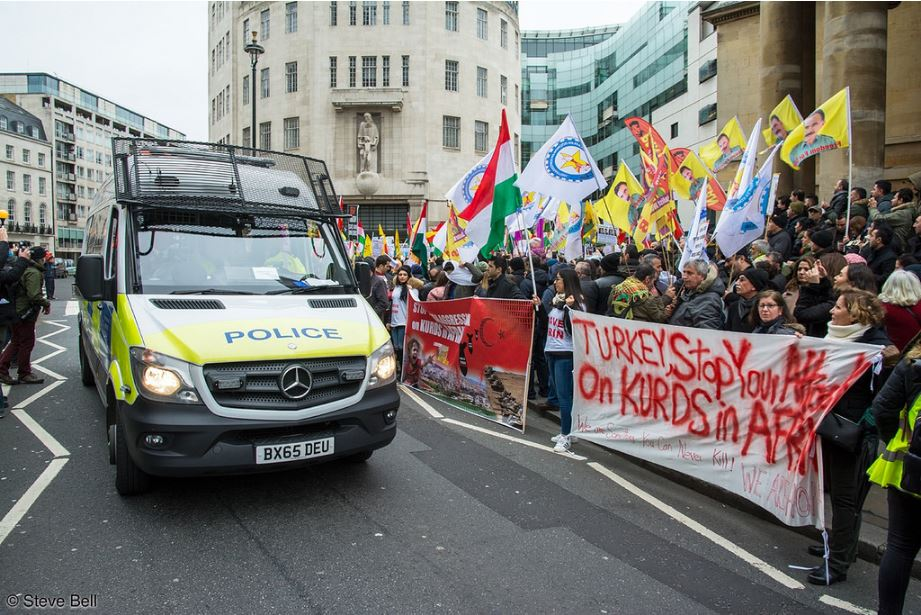
Protest in London against Operation Olive Branch, 31 March 2018

=== UN-member states ===
- Azerbaijan: Spokesman of Ministry of Foreign Affairs Hikmət Hacıyev said that Azerbaijan fully understands Turkey's security concerns against the "terror threat". Hacıyev also said: "Azerbaijan, which suffered from terrorism, condemns all forms and manifestations of terrorism and supports the efforts of the international community in the fight against this menace."
- Bulgaria: The President of Bulgaria Rumen Radev condemned the operation and insisted that the European Union should intervene to stop it.
- Cyprus: The Republic of Cyprus condemned the Turkish invasion in Afrin as "illegal" and stressed that the Syrian crisis cannot be resolved by military means.
- Egypt: On 21 January, Egypt condemned Turkey's military operation in the Afrin region and stated it was a serious threat to Syria's sovereignty. On 19 March, the foreign ministry of Egypt condemned Turkey's capture of Afrin from the YPG, affirming its rejection of any "infringement on Syrian sovereignty", denouncing the large-scale displacement of Syrian civilians as well as the grave humanitarian threats posed by Turkey's seizure of the city: "Egypt considers the ongoing breach of Syrian sovereignty unacceptable."
- France: Since Ankara launched its operation against Afrin, Paris has been an unrelenting critic of the Turkish stance. Minister of Foreign Affairs Jean-Yves Le Drian called for an emergency United Nations Security Council meeting hours after the Turkish incursion into Afrin. On Twitter, he indicated that the meeting would also cover the situation in Ghouta and Idlib. President Emmanuel Macron stated on 31 January 2018, that if the Operation Olive Branch intends something different from securing Turkish borders against terrorists and evolves into an attempted invasion, that it becomes a real problem for France. Macron also stated that Turkey must respect Syria's sovereignty. On 7 February France's foreign minister Jean-Yves Le Drian said that Ankara should not worsen the Syrian conflict: "Ensuring the security of its borders does not mean killing civilians and that should be condemned. In a dangerous situation in Syria, (Turkey) should not add war to war." On 13 March, France's foreign minister Jean-Yves Le Drian told lawmakers in parliament that Turkey's operation against the YPG in the Afrin region was not justified, the strongest language yet from Paris regarding its NATO ally's intervention in Syria. On 29 March 2018, French President Emmanuel Macron vowed to send troops to Syria's Manbij in a bid to assist local SDF militias in preventing Turkish forces from advancing on the town. On 30 March it was reported that France offered to mediate between Turkey and the SDF, an offer immediately rejected by Turkey.
- Germany: The assistant spokesman from the Minister for Foreign Affairs said that "Turkey has legitimate security interests along its border with Syria. We hope and expect that Turkey will continue to exert political and military restraint". Breul also added that Germany believes that the focus of military activities in northern Syria should be on ISIL and its successor terrorist organizations in the region. Due to the ongoing Operation Olive Branch, Germany halted the upgrading of the Leopard 2 tanks. According to Sigmar Gabriel, the German government decided it was better not to deliver arms to conflict zones. In the German parliament on 1 February, all parties criticised the Turkish assault on Afrin. As Turkey has been reportedly used Leopard 2A4 tanks (which are German-made) in the operation, the oppositional parties Die Linke and Die Grüne demanded a halt to all military cooperation with Turkey. After meeting with Turkish officials in Munich, the leader of the Green party, Cem Özdemir, who is a critic of the operation, received special police protection after being called a "terrorist" and receiving various other threats from the Turkish delegation. On 21 February, the chairman of the Bundestag foreign affairs committee. CDU's Norbert Röttgen said that Turkey should entirely withdraw from Syria and return to a political path in its conflict with Kurds. On 21 March, German chancellor Angela Merkel criticized Turkey's military offensive in Afrin: "Despite all justified security interests of Turkey, it's unacceptable what's happening in Afrin, where thousands and thousands of civilians are being pursued, are dying or have to flee."
- Iran: A spokesman for the Ministry of Foreign Affairs on 21 January said: "Iran hopes that this operation will be ended immediately to prevent a deepening of the crisis in the border regions of Turkey and Syria. A continued crisis in Afrin may boost (..) terrorist groups in northern Syria." On 5 February, Hassan Rouhani, the President of Iran, demanded Turkey to immediately halt its operation.
- Iraq: The Iraqi government condemned the operation. Iraqi foreign minister Ibrahim al-Jaafari on 4 February stated: "We reject any foreign nation from intervening in the affairs of another country."
- Luxembourg: In a 19 March media interview, Luxembourg's foreign minister Jean Asselborn said about Turkey's conduct that "this has nothing to do with self-defence any more", adding that Turkey would have to cease and desist from attacking the YPG and explain its conduct in Afrin to the NATO council.
- Netherlands: The Dutch Minister of Foreign Affairs, Halbe Zijlstra, on 22 January said that Turkey had the right to defend itself and its border, but at the same time pleaded with Turkey to show restraint. He also mentioned in his letter to the Dutch parliament that the Turkish offensive in Afrin would impact the joint fight against ISIL. He believes this to be the case, because the Kurdish YPG fights alongside the international coalition against ISIL, and are now being attacked by Turkey. Furthermore, he hopes to get more information from Turkish authorities concerning the operation, however, if this is not the case, then he will ask for more clarity at the next NATO meeting.
- Qatar: Spokeswoman of Ministry of Foreign Affairs, Lulwah Rashif Al-Khater said that: "The launching of the Turkish military operation last Saturday was motivated by legitimate concerns related to its national security and the security of its borders, in addition to protecting Syria's territorial integrity from the danger of secession. Turkey, a NATO member, has always been a stabilizing factor in the region." She also added that Turkey's counterterrorist operation in Syria's Afrin region was motivated by legitimate security concerns.
- Russia: Chairman of the Defense Committee of the State Duma Vladimir Shamanov said: "Not to recognize the Turkish interests in Afrin is impossible." Assistant to the Secretary of the Security Council of Russia Alexander Venediktov said: "The Kurds are being boosted with advanced weaponry. The deliveries of modern weapons and encouragement of separatist sentiments among the Kurds have in fact provoked Turkey into carrying out the military operation in Syria's northern Afrin region." On 9 April, Russian Foreign Minister Sergey Lavrov said that Russia expects Turkey to bring Afrin under the control of the Syrian government. On 26 October 2021, Elbrus Kutrashev, the Russian ambassador to Iraq said “there is a process of demographic change. It is done against [the] Kurdish presence there. This is what I call a disaster [against] the local population.”
- Sweden: The Foreign Minister and Deputy Prime Minister of Sweden Margot Wallström on 7 February cancelled her visit to Turkey that was due in two weeks, to protest the Afrin invasion.
- United Kingdom: Boris Johnson, Secretary of State for Foreign and Commonwealth Affairs said: "Watching developments in Afrin closely. Turkey is right to want to keep its borders secure. We share the goal of reducing violence and keeping the focus on the most important task: a political process in Syria that leads to the end of the Assad regime." On 26 January, PM Theresa May called Turkish President Recep Tayyip Erdoğan, both have agreed that civilians must be protected in his country's offensive against a Kurdish militia in Syria. Downing Street spokesman said: "The leaders discussed the ongoing Turkish operation in Afrin in Syria, with the Prime Minister recognising the right of Turkey to secure its border."
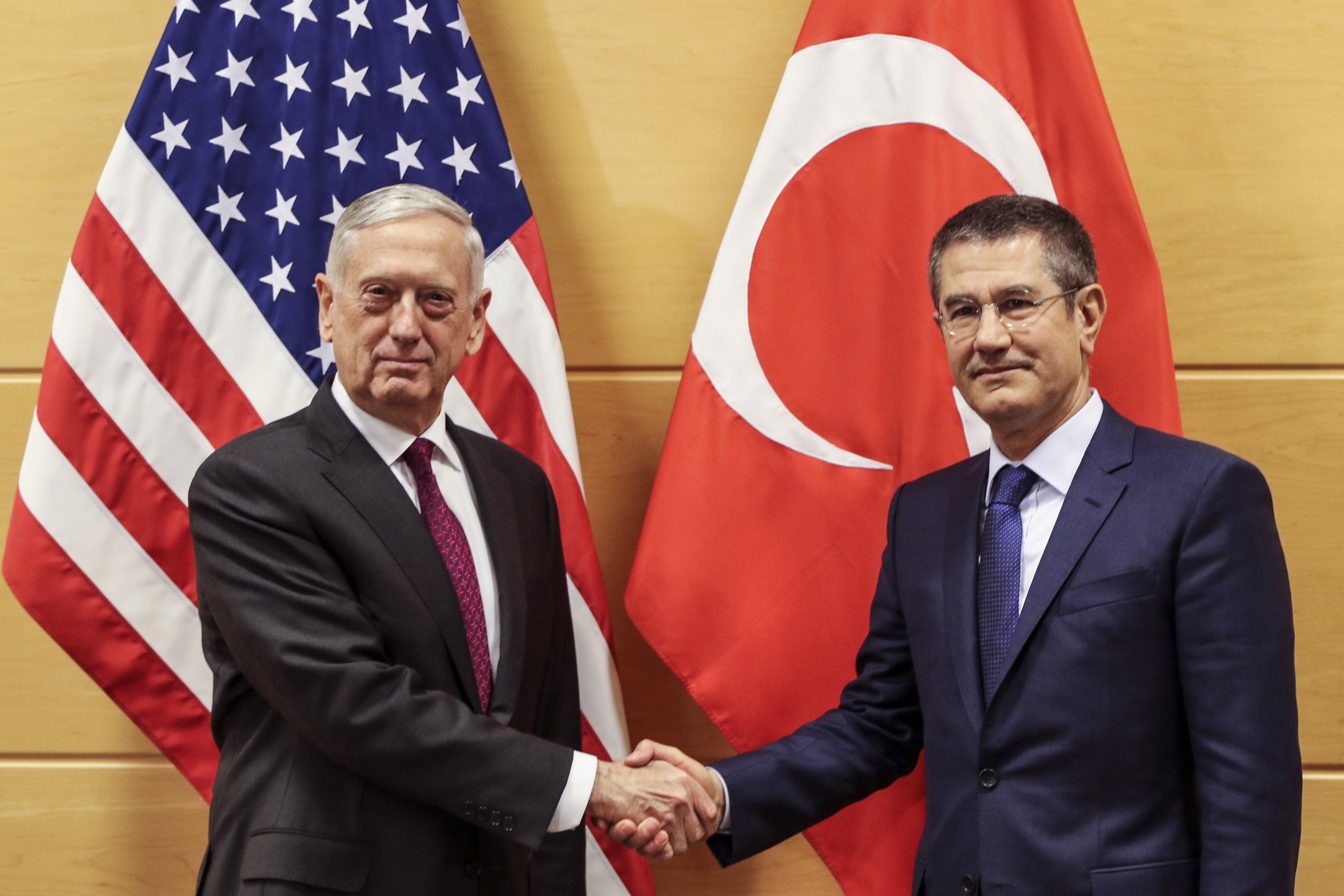
  US Secretary of Defense James Mattis and Turkish Defense Minister Nurettin Canikli at NATO headquarters in Brussels, February 2018
- United States: A spokesman for the Pentagon stated: "We encourage all parties to avoid escalation and to focus on the most important task of defeating ISIS." The spokesman then added that the United States understands Turkey's concerns about the PKK, but would like to see a deescalation of violence and instead focus on fighting ISIS. US Secretary of State Rex Tillerson said that US is "very concerned" and that the operation should remain limited in scope and should show restraint. In a phone call on 24 January 2018, President Donald Trump urged Erdoğan to "deescalate, limit its military actions, and avoid civilian casualties and increases to displaced persons and refugees." Turkish Deputy Prime Minister Bekir Bozdag urged the United States to halt its support for Kurdish YPG fighters, saying: "Those who support the terrorist organization will become a target in this battle." After Turkey has urged the US to remove its troops from Manbij, saying that otherwise they might come under attack from Turkish troops; however, US General Votel confirmed an American commitment to keeping troops in Manbij. In an interview Defense Secretary James Mattis stated that Turkey is the only NATO state which has an insurgency inside its borders, and has "legitimate security concerns". He also said that Turkey warned the US, before they launched the operation against the SDF. On 12 February, the United States Department of Defense released a budget blueprint for 2019 which with respect to the Democratic Federation of Northern Syria (DFNS) included $300 million for the Syrian Democratic Forces (SDF) and $250 million for border security.

=== Supranational organizations ===
- Arab League: On 19 February, Arab League Secretary General Ahmed Aboul-Gheit appealed to Turkey for restraint in "intervening in an Arab country south of your borders." On 15 April, the Arab League passed a resolution calling on Turkish forces to withdraw from Afrin.
- European Union: The High Representative of the Union for Foreign Affairs and Security Policy Federica Mogherini said she was "extremely worried" and would seek talks with Turkish officials. She expressed her concerns for two reasons: "One side is the humanitarian one – we need to make sure that humanitarian access is guaranteed and that civilian population and people are not suffering from military activities on the ground." The second issue was the offensive "can undermine seriously the resumption of talks in Geneva, which is what we believe could really bring sustainable peace and security for Syria". On 8 February, the European Parliament condemned the mass arrest of critics in Turkey of the Afrin operation, and criticized the military intervention as raising serious humanitarian concerns. "[MEPs] are seriously concerned about the humanitarian consequences of the Turkish assault and warn against continuing with these disproportionate actions," the parliament's statement said. On 19 March, Federica Mogherini criticized Turkey, saying that international efforts in Syria are supposed to be "aiming at de-escalating the military activities and not escalating them."
- NATO: Secretary General Jens Stoltenberg said during a press conference in Madrid that Turkey is "the NATO Ally which has suffered most from terrorist attacks over many years and Turkey, as all of the countries, have the right to self defence, but it is important that this is done in a proportionate and measured way."
- Organization for Security and Co-operation in Europe: OSCE has criticized the Turkish government over the detention of social media users for criticizing the operation.
- The United Nations High Commissioner of Human Rights Michelle Bachelet demanded an independent investigation on the reports of human rights violations occurring in Afrin.

=== Other political entities ===
- Iraqi Turkmen Front: Aydin Maruf, lawmaker of ITF said: "We are well aware that this operation targets terrorist organizations in Afrin and not local residents or our Kurdish brothers. The armed groups currently based there, in Afrin, pose a serious threat to Turkey and the wider region. Iraq's Turkmen, as always, stand with the Turkish Republic. We believe this operation will serve to restore peace, prosperity and brotherhood to the area. The PYD/PKK terrorist group's presence in the Iraqi district of Sinjar disturbs all of the region's ethnic groups. We believe therefore that it is important to launch another such operation in Sinjar."
- Kurdistan Regional Government: Kurdish Parliament condemned the Turkish military operation in Afrin, calling on the United Nations and the international community to stop the attacks.
- Kurdistan Workers' Party: PKK's women wing YJA member Ulkem Guneş, who uses Ciwal Simal as her nom de guerre, said: "Afrin resistance will open the northern revolution of Kurdistan and Turkey." She also called for uprising inside Turkey. Her speech ended with "Long Live Afrin Resistance" and "Leader Apo" slogans.
- Kosovo: Kosovan Police prohibited a pro-Kurdish "Freedom to Kurdistan" event from taking place. Official reasons by the police given were there was the organizers lacked permits and that "unnamed individuals might try to cause an incident during the event that could result in consequences". Turkish media praised that ban, claiming that the event would spread pro-terrorist propaganda. Minister of Public Administration Mahir Yağcılar condemned the planned event, calling it a "provocation" and urged people to avoid activities that would damage Kosovo's image and the country's relations with Turkey.
- Northern Cyprus: Turkish Cypriot Prime Minister Hüseyin Özgürgün said his greatest wish is the successful outcome of the Afrin operation. Foreign Minister Kudret Özersay said: "We fully stand by and are a supporter of Turkey in its fight against terrorism and in its steps that have been taken to ensure its territorial integrity."
  - The office of the Turkish Cypriot newspaper, Afrika, was attacked after Erdoğan pointed out in a public speech that the newspaper wrote an article entitled "Yet Another Invasion by Turkey", referring to what they perceived to be the operation's similarities with the Turkish invasion of Cyprus. Erdoğan called it a "dirty headline" and suggested that "his compatriots in Northern Cyprus" should "give the necessary response to this", which provoked a crowd of 500 protesters to surround the newspaper's offices and hurl eggs, stones, and water bottles while some carrying flags of Erdoğan. The attacks damaged furniture, windows, and equipment. The police, who were at the scene, watched the incident and did not intervene. Mustafa Akıncı, President of Northern Cyprus, condemned the attack and went to the site during the rally to request extra security for the newspaper, only to be attacked by the crowd himself. A March for Peace and Democracy was organised by civil society in response to the attack.
