= Wrath of Olives Operations Room =

Wrath of Olives
- Official logo of the operations room.
- Founded: 2018
- Active regions: Afrin District (former Afrin Canton), Syria
- Status: Active

The Wrath of Olives (Kurdish: Xezeba Zeytûnê, Arabic: غضب الزيتون, romanized: Ghadab al-Zaytun) operations room is an insurgent group that is active in Turkish-controlled areas of northern Syria.

== History ==
The group claims to have been founded following the Turkish invasion of Afrin, backed by an assortment of rebel groups. The group has been active since mid-summer 2018 and has carried out dozens of assassinations and bombings against Turkish-backed rebel forces. As the group has vowed to kill not just Turkish soldiers and allied Syrian militants, but all who cooperate with the pro-Turkish forces, it and another anti-Turkish insurgent faction (the "Afrin Falcons") have been described as "death squads". Middle East security analyst Nicholas A. Heras has argued that the Wrath of Olives operations room and the Afrin Falcons were formed as front organizations of the YPG, as the latter "is under pressure from the United States to disassociate itself from the most controversial assassinations in Afrin." Similarly, the pro-Syrian government al-Masdar News described the group as "YPG sleeper cell".

T. Schmidinger told Al-Monitor that the label Wrath of Olives has been interpreted as a reference to claims that Turkey appropriated Afrin’s formerly lucrative olive harvest. During Afrin's occupation, Turkish-aligned groups destroyed large numbers of olive trees, pressured farmers to sell their produce at very low prices, and removed or confiscated local olive-oil presses.

The Wrath of Olives operations room is among the most active insurgent groups in Afrin, along with the YPG and the Afrin Liberation Forces.

== Tactics ==
The group primarily wages a guerrilla campaign against the Turkish-backed forces in the countryside, using ambushes and bombings, often striking in the night. Unlike the YPG forces in Afrin, the Wrath of Olives operations room also carries out kidnappings, executions, and assassinations against Turkish-backed militants and civilians who collaborate with Turkish forces. For example, the group reportedly attempted several times to kill Hasan Şindi, a member of the Turkish-backed Afrin Council until he fled for Europe in August 2018.
