= Leila al-Shami =

British-Syrian activist and writer

- Born: October 1978 (age 47)
- Other name: Leila al-Shami
- Occupations: Human rights defender, activist, blogger
- Years active: 2000–
- Employers: United Nations; Centre on Housing Rights and Evictions; Oxfam
- Website: https://leilashami.wordpress.com/

Leila al-Shami (Arabic: ليلى الشامي) is a British-Syrian human rights defender, anarchist political activist, blogger and writer. She was a member of Haitham al-Maleh's Human Rights Association in Syria (HRAS) during the Damascus Spring in 2001, co-founded the Tahrir International Collective Network during the Arab Spring in 2012, and co-authored Burning Country: Syrians in Revolution and War with Robin Yassin-Kassab in 2016.

== Biography ==
=== Early life and activism in Syria ===
Daughter of a communist and former political prisoner exiled from Ba'athist Syria, al-Shami grew up in the United Kingdom. Shortly after graduating with a master's degree in human rights from a British university, in the autumn of 2000 she moved to Syria to stay with her family in the Tiliani neighbourhood of Damascus, and met Syrian Communist Party (Political Bureau)'s secretary general Riad al-Turk through her father, al-Turk's "close friend and former comrade". She accepted al-Turk's encouragement to dedicate her work to Syria and participated in political activities and the launching of civil society initiatives during the Damascus Spring of 2000–2001. She joined the Human Rights Association in Syria (HRAS) in Baramkeh (Damascus), founded in May 2001 by Haitham al-Maleh and Razan Zaitouneh. Working closely with Zaitouneh, the only other female member of HRAS, she did advocacy work for political prisoners, including al-Turk.

=== Human rights career ===
Al-Shami left Syria for the UK due to safety concerns not long after Bashar al-Assad's crackdown on opposition and civil society of August 2001. She soon returned to the Middle East and worked as a human rights defender with local and global non-governmental organizations and United Nations agencies, primarily in Palestine and Yemen, for a total of 15 years.

At the time of the outbreak of the Arab Spring in January 2011, she continued to be based in Palestine.

=== Activism during the Syrian civil war ===
Under her pseudonym Leila al-Shami, joined the anti-authoritarian movement as part of the Syrian revolution and worked with a number of the eventual leaders of the uprising, again including Razan Zaitouneh, who now co-founded the Local Coordination Committees of Syria. In 2012, al-Shami was among the six founders of the collective-run weblog Tahrir International Collective Network, where she also published individual pieces. The English- and Arabic-language blog, particularly active in its first two years, popularised the thought of the Syrian anarchist Omar Aziz and served as the first online archive of anarchist texts, while the group facilitated connections between anarchist groups in the Middle East and North Africa. According to al-Shami, its purpose was to "make anarchist and anti-authoritarian struggles visible". Al-Shami's 2013 obituary of Omar Aziz was translated into Greek, Italian, Catalan and French, and in the same year she travelled on behalf of TICN to Greece, Italy, Spain and Poland to discuss the Syrian revolution in anarchist spaces. She was by far the most prolific author of texts commemorating the local councils of the initial stage of the Syrian revolution, ahead of Robin Yassin-Kassab. In October 2013, she started to blog as Leila al-Shami "on popular struggles, human rights and social justice from an anti-authoritarian perspective".

In 2016, al-Shami returned permanently from the Middle East to the United Kingdom, settling down in Scotland.

In January 2016, she published Burning Country: Syrians in Revolution and War with Robin Yassin-Kassab. The book, which she dedicated to Razan Zaitouneh, was praised as "telling the Syrian story" by the Syrian opposition intellectual Yassin al-Haj Saleh, as an "important, honest and insightful" work by the Elliott School of International Affairs political scientist Marc Lynch, and as "the definitive book" on Syria and "a must-read" by Chatham House fellow Hassan Hassan. Al-Shami and her co-author toured the United States extensively to promote the book, speaking at the Tahrir Institute for Middle East Policy and the Middle East Institute in Washington, DC. In 2017, they also toured Spain where, according to Yassin Kassab, an online protest campaign was mounted against al-Shami that accused her of being an "imperialist" and a "Salafi rat".

From 2016 onwards, al-Shami contributed op-eds to The New York Times, Open Democracy, The New Arab, and Al-Jumhuriya, an online news platform co-founded by Yassin al-Haj Saleh, Her writing was also featured on the Google-sponsored citizen journalism website Global Voices between 2016 and 2018, while Elia Ayoub was its regional editor for the Middle East and North Africa, and in the In These Times magazine.

In 2021, she was involved in the "100 Faces of the Syrian Revolution" campaign.

Al-Shami is a member of The Peoples Want, an activist network centred on mutual aid and "cultural offensive" that grew out of festivals organised by the Paris-based Syrian Canteen between 2019 and 2023 against the background of a new "transnational" series of protests in 2019 (in Algeria, Hong Kong, Iran, Lebanon), and "opened up for membership" in March 2025. The Peoples Want aims to "relaunch a genuine revolutionary internationalism" based on "the emerging popular powers born of the wave of revolutionary uprisings that began in 2011", and in al-Shami's words welcomes "people who are trying to build material and political autonomy". It sent a delegation to the 2025 meeting held by the Zapatista Army of National Liberation in Altamirano, Chiapas. The network's manifesto puts shared experience and practice of resistance above "visions of change or ideological convictions".

=== After the Syrian civil war ===
Together with Elia Ayoub and Ayman Makarem, al-Shami co-founded the media collective From the Periphery, registered as a limited company in the United Kingdom in February 2025. The group produces podcasts (including Syria: The Inconvenient Revolution hosted by al-Shami) and YouTube content. Describing itself as "explicitly anti-authoritarian", it proposes to "center the voices of those traditionally marginalized in global reporting" and to "foster storytelling that is driven by lived experience", in opposition to "media and knowledge colonialism" and "exploitative hierarchies in media productions".

In a February 2025 interview, al-Shami said it had not been safe for her until the fall of the Assad regime two months earlier to return to Syria. She visited Damascus in April 2025.

In July 2025, al-Shami held the Q&A alongside Robin Yassin-Kassab at the Palestine Solidarity Campaign's screening of the 2024 film Where Olive Trees Weep (featuring Gabor Maté and Ahed Tamimi) in Dumfries, Scotland.

== Books ==
- Burning Country: Syrians in Revolution and War (as Leila al-Shami; with Robin Yassin-Kassab), London: Pluto Press, 2016, ISBN 9780745336220
  - Spanish translation by Begoña Valle as País en llamas. Los sirios en la revolución y en la guerra, Madrid: Capitán Swing, 2017, ISBN 9788494645372
  - French collective translation as Burning country : au coeur de la révolution syrienne, Paris: L'Échappée, 2019, ISBN 9782373090529

== Bibliography ==
- Streiff, Fritz; Khagdo, Kristina; Katt, Mais, eds. (2023), The Syria Trials: Putting the Pieces Together: A Podcast to Read (PDF), Stichting 75 Podcasts
- Woller, Almut (2023), Remembering anarchism in the Arab Spring in digital media: Omar Aziz and the Syrian local councils (PDF), PhD thesis: Free University of Berlin
- Yassin-Kassab, Robin; al-Shami, Leila (2018), Burning Country: Syrians in Revolution and War (2nd ed.), London: Pluto Press, ISBN 9780745337845
