= Robin Yassin-Kassab =

British writer

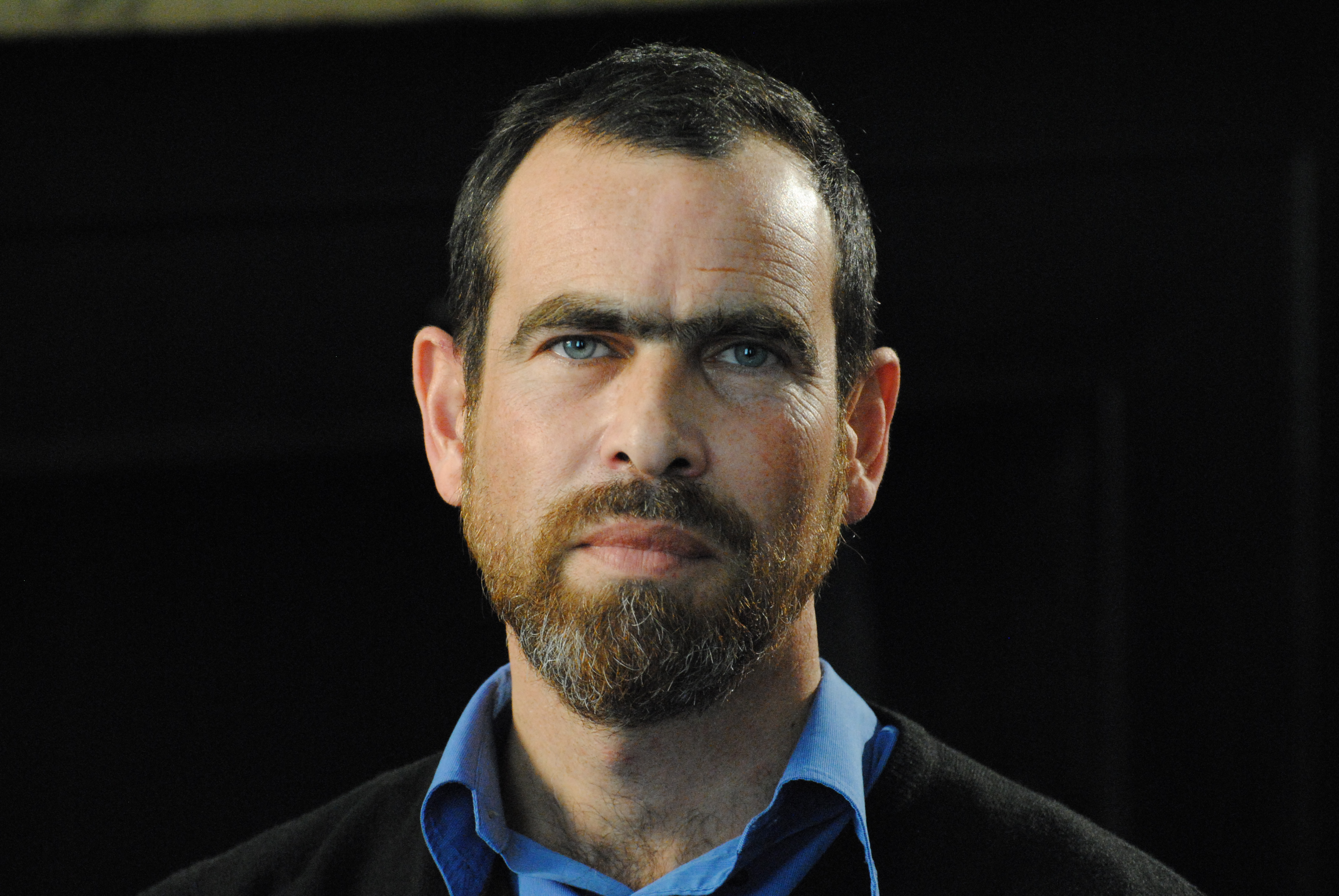
- Yassin-Kassab at Chatham House in 2016
- Born: 1969 (age 56–57); London
- Education: University of Oxford
- Occupations: Writer, analyst, journalist
- Employer: Prisons Museum
- Title: English-language editor-in-chief
- Term: 2024–
- Website: https://qunfuz.com

Robin Yassin-Kassab (born 1969) is a Scottish-Syrian political commentator, analyst and writer. He specialises in Syria and the Middle East. He is the author of the novel The Road from Damascus (2008) and of the non-fiction book Burning Country: Syrians in Revolution and War (2016) with Leila al-Shami, and serves as the chief English editor of the digital Prisons Museum.

== Biography ==
Yassin-Kassab was born in 1969 in west London to a Syrian father and an English mother. He grew up between Merseyside and Scotland, with six months in Beirut and a year in London. He attended Kirkcudbright Academy and graduated with a degree in English literature from the University of Oxford, followed by a diploma in teaching English and an MA in creative writing from the Manchester Metropolitan University.

He worked as a journalist for The News International in Pakistan and taught English abroad for the British Council in Saudi Arabia, Morocco, Turkey and Syria, travelling across the Arab countries and briefly returning to west London in 1994–1995. He lived in Muscat in Oman with his wife and two children from 2003 to 2008, teaching English at a university, then settled in the Galloway. He made his debut as a novelist with The Road from Damascus, described as a depiction of "postcolonial London" and recognised as "a Muslim book", in 2008. In 2006, he started blogging at Qunfuz.com.

In 2011, Yassin-Kassab became a media commentator on the Syrian revolution and civil war. In June 2011, after the outbreak of the Syrian revolution, he was interviewed on Syria by BBC Radio 4 and KCRW. He contributed regularly to The Guardian between 2011 and 2020. His political essays and book reviews were published in Foreign Policy, Al Jazeera, The Daily Beast, The Independent, The Observer, Prospect, Sunday Herald, The National in Abu Dhabi, The Electronic Intifada and the Palestine Chronicle. He spoke at the Palestine Festival of Literature in 2009, Inizjamed's Arab Spring-themed Malta Mediterranean Literature Festival and the British Council-organised Iraqi International Literature Festival in Erbil in 2011, at the Karachi Literature Festival and a panel chaired by the Telegraph's Benedict Brogan at the international edition of the Hay Festival in Beirut in 2012, and a Chatham House event on Syria in 2016.

By 2011, he started the weblog or web-based magazine Pulse jointly with the founding editor of New Lines Magazine Idrees Ahmad and Open Democracy's senior editor Danny Postel; Pulse received praise from Le Monde diplomatique and its contributors included Yassin al-Haj Saleh, Ilan Pappé, Ken Loach, and John Mearsheimer. He became a co-editor of the quarterly Critical Muslim together with its founder Ziauddin Sardar in the same year.

In 2013, he made two short visits to the Olive Tree Camp for refugees in Atme in Syria's Idlib Governorate. He also visited Raed Fares's media center in Kafranbel. The book was launched at the London office of Amnesty International and with a tour across the United States, was reviewed in the Middle East Eye, The Herald, The New Statesman and Political Studies Review, and received praise from Yassin al-Haj Saleh and the political scientist Marc Lynch. Yassin-Kassab wrote a foreword to Yassin al-Haj Saleh's 2017 book The Impossible Revolution: Making Sense of the Syrian Tragedy.

By 2024, he became the English-language editor-in-chief of the web-based virtual Prisons Museum. The initiative, started as a project by journalist Amer Matar in 2017, includes the ISIS Prisons Museum (registered and launched in Berlin in 2024) and the Syria Prisons Museum (launched in Damascus in September 2025). In 2024, he also joined the advisory board of the Ruta Association for Central, South-Eastern, Eastern European, Baltic, Caucasus, Central and Northern Asian Studies in Global Conversation, newly founded "in response to Russia's full-scale invasion of Ukraine".

== Work ==
=== The Road from Damascus (2008) ===
The novel was said to "humanize Arabs and Muslims … after 9/11" through its "Hamlet-like" protagonist, who struggles "with the specter of the father of … oppressive secularist pan-Arab nationalism", and to "voice debates on national and religious identity, on the domination of the Arab-Islamic world by the West, and on the existential choices migrants and exiles make". Described as "a reversal of St Paul's conversion to Christianity on the road to Damascus", "where the protagonist's journey, seeking belonging in his cultural roots, starts in secularism and ends in finding meaning and connection in a 'moderate' version of Islam, practised outside the Muslims' motherland, in the UK", it was read as "satirising a kind of secular fundamentalism that can, it suggests, be as blinding as dogma". One of the book's characters partly parodies the proposal of Salman Rushdie to replace religion with literature.

=== Burning Country (2016) ===
The book was described as a "work of political journalism from below", "a chorus of voices" containing "a wealth of stories and anecdotes", and "an authoritative … volume of reportage and analysis" with "no policy recommendations". It made a case for the persistence of a popular revolution amid the violence and rejected the narrative of a civil war with the distribution of responsibility that it implied. It argued that with "serious" foreign military support the Free Syrian Army might have defeated the regime before the emergence of the armed jihadist outfits.

Fellow ex-British Council employee Peter Clark wrote that Burning Country refused to consider the possibility of negotiations with the regime despite the ubiquitous presence of Ba'athist institutions in Syrian society. Historical geographer Seth J. Frantzman accepted the book's argument that the Assad regime helped Salafists overwhelm the rebellion, but remained unpersuaded by the claim that the initial months of the rebellion had been nonviolent and highlighted the insufficient explanation for the relative successes of the Democratic Union Party (PYD). The book's interpretation of the rebel capture of Aleppo by rural jihadist militants of the Qatari-backed Al-Tawhid Brigade in 2012 as the city's liberation and of their expulsion in 2016 as ethnic cleansing was criticised by the Yemeni-English researcher Nu'man Abd al-Wahid, who dismissed the claim of a revolution in Aleppo and accused Yassin-Kassab of being "one of Britain's leading regime-change propagandists".

The book was welcomed by the German chapter of the pro-Syrian Adopt a Revolution initiative as "a game changer for the discussion about Syria among radical leftists", due to the German left's long-standing support for the Democratic Federation of Rojava – Northern Syria. The book was also praised by Danish historian and Middle East scholar, Dietrich Jung, for giving voice to the non-violent protest movement in Syria and for its compelling analysis of "the dynamics of violence that transformed popular resistance into wicked warfare". The book was shortlisted for the 2017 Rathbones Folio prize.

== Views ==
In discussing the Palestinian cause, Yassin-Kassab has voiced support for "bringing culture into the equation", which, he said, went "against the grain for the traditional left".

In June 2011, Yassin-Kassab suggested that the influx of Syrian refugees into Turkey may prompt a "limited occupation of Syrian territory" by Recep Tayyip Erdoğan's government that "could … offer Syria its Benghazi, a base for organised resistance".

Along with Leila al-Shami, Yassin-Kassab defended the Syrian opposition from criticisms voiced among "western leftists", insisting on the importance of what he described as grassroots movements against the "traditional Marxist or anti-colonial narrative of liberation struggles". He took issue with the journalist Patrick Cockburn's wholly negative portrayal of the Syrian opposition and with Robert Fisk's reporting embedded with the Syrian Arab Army. Yassin-Kassab reproached Cockburn for having "conducted no interviews with Isis fighters"; he later explained his reasoning for excluding pro-regime voices from Burning Country.

During the closing months of the battle of Aleppo (2012–2016), he argued that Syrians in the city, which he described as "the liberated zone" and "Syria's most important centre of civil activism", "had no choice but to work with Nusra" which "came to the people's rescue", and accused the Kurdish-led Democratic Union Party (PYD) of having "helped prepare the siege by invading Arab-majority towns to the north". In interviews, Yassin-Kassab also emphasised that the pro-regime forces besieging Aleppo consisted mostly of "Shia jihadists from Lebanon, Iraq, Afghanistan and Pakistan, funded and trained by Iran" and declared that "victory for Assad is also a victory for ISIL".

Speaking to the Socialist Worker in March 2016, Yassin-Kassab called the recent proclamation of the Democratic Federation of Rojava – Northern Syria a "disaster". While stating his support for Kurdish local self-determination and cultural rights, and calling for "solidarity between the Kurdish councils and the councils in Arab majority areas", he accused the PYD of pursuing a separatist state project by linking up the non-contiguous Kurdish-majority cantons. He contrasted the PYD's democratic governance through councils, which he thought mirrored developments in rebel-held northern Aleppo, with what he described as an additional "layer of one-party state rule". He stated that the PYD, while "probably better than most political parties operating in the region", was "not really a revolutionary force" due to failing to break with the regime and "the imperial powers", but argued that "desperate people on the ground have the right to seek and receive aid, weapons and money from wherever they can get it". In another 2016 interview, he denounced the "romanticization or fetishization" of the PYD as "the one true progressive force in Syria", attributed the perceived distinction between "the Kurds [as] feminists and progressive and the Arabs [as] backward and religious" to the war situation in the respective areas and to racist stereotypes, and stated that although "federalism could be a very good idea in Syria" the PYD was "giving it a bad name" by "invading other people's lands" as part of the war against the Islamic State. Writing at the time of Turkey's Operation Olive Branch against the Syrian Democratic Forces in January 2018, he advanced the idea of local self-determination based on ethnic majorities and alleged that the PYD had been carrying out a "non-Syrian project" of "unsustainable" expansion on behalf of the "authoritarian-anarchist" Kurdistan Workers' Party (PKK).

Prior to the Syrian civil war, Yassin-Kassab "deplored the spread of Wahhabi ideology" through the efforts of the Saudi government. He named Hezbollah as one of the Islamist organisations he admired, and expressed a wish that "Islamist discourse [would] show greater awareness of the class dimension". However, his assessment of the group changed radically following their decision to support the Assad regime. Following the October 2023 attacks, he argued that the lack of Arab "representative governments" was the main obstacle to Arab liberation and peace in the Middle East.

Yassin-Kassab welcomed the fall of the Assad regime in December 2024 as "history resuming" for Syria. He praised the Syrian caretaker government's head Mohammed al-Bashir's prior record with the Syrian Salvation Government in Idlib, as well as Hay'at Tahrir al-Sham leader Ahmed al-Sharaa's "non-dictatorial", "pragmatic and accommodating" approach, while noting the continued militia-style distribution of government responsibilities on the basis of personal loyalty ties. He credited domestic pressures for Sharaa's clean break with the Islamic State, approved of the Syrian president's US-guided negotiations with Israel, and expressed confidence in his promises favouring the Kurdish opposition to PYD ahead of the March 2025 agreement with the Syrian Democratic Forces.

Yassin-Kassab cited Saul Bellow as a "great influence" on his writing, despite finding him "politically disgusting". He also stated that Salman Rushdie had been important to him in his university days.

== Publications ==
- The Road from Damascus, London: Hamish Hamilton, 2008, ISBN 9780241144091
  - Italian translation by Andrea Buzzi as Il traditore, Milano: Il Saggiatore, 2008, ISBN 9788842815303
- Burning Country: Syrians in Revolution and War (with Leila al-Shami), London: Pluto Press, 2016, ISBN 9780745336220; 2nd edn. 2018, ISBN 9780745337821
  - Spanish translation by Begoña Valle as País en llamas. Los sirios en la revolución y en la guerra, Madrid: Capitán Swing, 2017, ISBN 9788494645372
  - French collective translation as Burning country : au coeur de la révolution syrienne, Paris: L'Échappée, 2019, ISBN 9782373090529

== Personal life ==
Yassin-Kassab married Rana Zaitoon, a Syrian, in 1997. They have two children, Ibrahim and Ayaat. He is a resident of Dumfries and Galloway.

He has acknowledged the deceased Syrian novelist Khaled Khalifa and the Iraqi-Finnish film director Hassan Blasim as his friends.

== Bibliography ==
- Chambers, Claire (2011), British Muslim Fictions: Interviews with Contemporary Writers, Basingstoke: Palgrave Macmillan, pp. 191–206, doi:10.1057/9780230343085_10, ISBN 978-0-230-30878-7
