= Political prisoners in Ba'athist Syria =

From 1964 until 2011, the State of Emergency Law in Syria allowed for arbitrary detention of political suspects at will for an unlimited duration of time. During this time, tens of thousands have been arrested, tortured, and held in isolation for months to years without charge or trial. Although the state of emergency was officially lifted in 2011 at the outbreak of the Syrian Civil War, arrests continued. Civil society activists, media workers (including citizen journalists), and medical and humanitarian workers have been targeted by the Assad regime, its militias, and by non-state armed groups.

== Recent history ==
In May 2011, Bashar al-Assad officially decreed a general amnesty to all political prisoners, and on June 21, 2012 declared amnesty for all crimes committed before June 20 according to State Television. However, in January 2014, an extensive report was released containing evidence smuggled out of the country showing the systematic killing and torture of about 11,000 detainees.

According to the Center for Documentation of Violations in Syria, a monitoring group composed of a network of Syrian opposition activists that documents human rights violations committed through the course of the Syrian uprising, there were 37,245 prisoners in Syria as of March 2014.

=== Detentions by government forces ===
In March 2011, several hundred protests gathered at the Ministry of the Interior in Damascus. Security forces arrested more than 38 people at the protest including Syrian author Tayeb Tizini, human rights activist Soheir Atasi, and seven relatives of opposition figure Kamal Labwani.

In 2014, an anonymous defector from the Syrian military police claims to have smuggled 55,000 digital photographs of 11,000 dead detainees in Syrian prisons. These photographs, alongside testament to their authenticity, were released in a report authored by British lawyers and commissioned by the government of Qatar, which was shown to the United Nations Security Council in April 2014 in efforts by French delegates to have the International Criminal Court investigate the case as crimes against humanity. According to Samantha Power, United States ambassador to the UN, "the gruesome images of corpses bearing marks of starvation, strangulation and beatings... indicate that the Assad regime has carried out systematic, widespread and industrial killing." Assad claimed that these are allegations lacked evidence, saying: "It’s funded by Qatar, and they say it’s an anonymous source. So nothing is clear or proven. The pictures are not clear which person they show. They’re just pictures of a head, for example, with some skulls. Who said this is done by the government, not by the rebels? Who said this is a Syrian victim, not someone else?" The Assad regime was not a member of the International Criminal Court and therefore could only be prosecuted in it through a referral by the UN Security Council. Which was unlikely, given the veto power of Russia, a strong ally of Assad, in the Security Council.

The Britain-based Syrian Observatory for Human Rights reported in 2015 that an estimated 200,000 Syrians have been arrested by regime forces since the uprising began in 2011, and that nearly 13,000 Syrians, including 108 children, had been tortured to death in the prisons. Rami Abdel-Rahman, head of the Observatory, states that security officials are known to starve detainees to death, deny medicine to those who are ill, and subject them to psychological torture. According to Abdel-Rahman, some of the families of those who were killed under torture have been forced to sign statements that their loved ones were killed by rebel groups.

=== Abductions by opposition factions ===
It is alleged that groups in opposition to the regime in the Syrian Civil War abducted and detained individuals arbitrarily. According to a brief released by Amnesty International in December 2013, the Islamic State of Iraq and al-Sham (ISIS), an opposition group that controlled significant territory in northern Syria at the time, was responsible for abductions and arbitrary detentions of citizens. AI states that those targeted by ISIS for abduction have included a "wide range of individuals, including people suspected of committing ordinary crimes, such as theft or murder, and others accused of committing religiously prohibited acts, such as zina (sex out of wedlock) and alcohol consumption. As well, ISIS forces have targeted local people suspected of organizing protests and opposition to their rule, including community activists and members of local councils set up to provide services to residents following the withdrawal of Syrian government forces, other civil society and media activists, and commanders and members of rival armed groups, including those operating as part of the Free Syrian Army. ISIS was also alleged to have abducted foreign nationals, including journalists, staff of international organizations and religious figures."

In December 2013, prominent human rights defender Razan Zeitouneh and three of her colleagues Wael Hamada, Samira Khalil, and Nazem Hammadi were abducted by an unknown armed group, believed to be associated with the Army of Islam, from their office at the Center for Documentation of Violations in Syria in Douma, a city outside of Damascus under the control of a number of armed groups.

According to eyewitnesses, in December 2014 in the town of Al Bab near the Turkish border, 50 Syrian civilians who were being held in a makeshift prison by ISIS forces for violation of Sharia law, were killed by airstrikes by United States forces who were targeting ISIS headquarters. Although the United States Central Command confirmed the airstrike, they claim that a review has shown no evidence of civilian casualties. However, civil defense volunteers claim to have removed 50 civilians bodies from the rubble of the building, as well as the bodies of 13 ISIS guards.

== Release of prisoners ==
In June 2014, 320 prisoners were released from Aleppo Central Prison, according to Syrian state news and confirmed by the Syrian Observatory for Human Rights. Activists state that most of the prisoners released from Aleppo prison had tuberculosis. The release is claimed to come as part of an amnesty granted by President Bashar al-Assad as a celebratory gesture following his re-election on 3 June 2014.

== See also ==
- Bassel Khartabil
