= Supreme Council of the Syrian Revolution =

Syrian opposition group

- Abbreviation: SCSR
- Formation: 2011
- Purpose: Opposition to President Bashar al-Assad
- Region served: Syria
- Official language: Arabic
- Parent organization: Syrian opposition

Supreme Council of the Syrian Revolution (SCSR) (Arabic: المجلس الأعلى للثورة السورية) is a Syrian opposition group supporting the overthrow of the Bashar al-Assad government in Syria during the Syrian civil war. It grants local opposition groups representation in its national organisation.

One of three national opposition groups — the other two being the Local Coordination Committees (LCCs) and Syrian Revolution General Commission (SRGC) — the SCSR has been described as catering to young protesters and being different from the other two groups in its political position. It sets "outlines for a political solution while also recognising the importance of armed struggle". Unlike the SRGC it has sent representatives to Syrian National Council (SNC) exile group meetings, and unlike the LCCs it is not formally a member of the Syrian National Council.

The group was classed as amongst the "most active" by think tank Mediterranean Affairs in 2019.

== See also ==
- Civil uprising phase of the Syrian Civil War
- National Coalition of Syrian Revolutionary and Opposition Forces
- Syrian National Council
- Syrian Revolution Network
- Syrian Revolution Coordinators Union
- Syrian Revolution General Commission
