= Sarah Hunaidi =

Syrian writer (born 1995)

Sarah Hunaidi, or Sara Hunaidi, (born 1995) is a Syrian writer and human rights activist. She is a member of the Syrian Women Political Movement.

== Biography ==
Hunaidi was born in 1995 in Suwaida Governorate, Syria, to a Syrian father and a Lebanese mother. She was in the 11th grade at the start of the Syrian revolution in 2011. Her cousin, Sate’ Ihsan Hunaidi, who was killed by the Syrian army at a checkpoint in April 2011, was commemorated as the first martyr of the revolution in Suwaida. At a young age, she became involved in the uprising by writing anti-regime posts on Facebook, attending flash protests in her city, and helping other activists. In 2014, at the age of 19, Hunaidi was forced into exile from Syria due to threats to her life for her opposition to the Syrian regime. She has since lived in Lebanon, Turkey, and the United States, where she currently resides. She studied International Relations at DePaul University in Chicago, and holds a master's degree in Near and Middle Eastern Studies from Harvard University.

Hunaidi is a contributor to publications such as Foreign Policy, the Independent, BuzzFeed, the BBC, Al Jazeera English, and NPR. She is working on a biography of Samira Khalil, a Syrian activist who went missing in 2013. Hunaidi is noted for translating her diaries written during the siege of Douma.
