= Syrian Revolution Coordinators Union =

Syrian Opposition Organization

Syrian Revolution Coordinators Union (اتحاد تنسيقيات الثورة السورية)
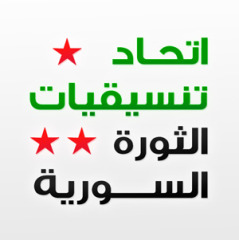
- Founded: March 2011
- Type: Organization/Network
- Purpose: "Toppling Criminal Assad Regime & Building a democratic Syria"
- Location: Syria
- Coordinates: 33.5185°N 36.3016°E
- Method: civil disobedience, protests, strikes
- Members: 200–300 (May 2011)
- Key people: Amer Al-Sadeq, Ibrahem Koki
- Website: syrcu.org

The Syrian Revolution Coordinators Union or (SYRCU) (Arabic: اتحاد تنسيقيات الثورة السورية) is an organization with members from different protest coordination groups from all around Syria. Its members represent their areas and cities for the activities of the Syrian uprising that began in 2011 against the Syrian government. The Syrian Revolution Coordinators Union has been active since the beginning of the revolution in peaceful resistance

The Union includes more than 216 coordination group, local council and group of activists of the protests in Syria. It aims to "end to the ruling of the 40-years-old al-Assad family ruling Syria, particularly after that government started using lethal force against peaceful protest asking for reform and freedom in May 2011 in the southern Syrian city of Daraa". The SRCU aims to "build Syria as country of democracy and rule of law; where civil and human rights are obeyed by citizens and authorities".

== Supporting Social Journalism ==
The Union has helped a number of individual activists and social journalists to relay the news about their areas by providing basic equipment and training.

== Projects ==
- Syrian FM opposition radio station.
- The ROP Project (Will be launched soon)

== Humanitarian & Medical Work ==
The Syrian Revolution Coordinators Union has conducted, through its local humanitarian and medical member groups, many humanitarian activities and field hospitals equipment. Particularly since the government's activities has practically disabled the work of any Syrian or foreign NGOs to help injured people and refugees. The SRCU has provided through donors inside and out Syria a number of food boxes, shift clinic equipment and medical supplies to different areas in distress.

Since the beginning of the Syrian uprising against the government, any civilian or protester injured by the regime forces, army or Shabiha militias will have to be treated by volunteer medics or doctors in improvised sites, houses or dedicated shift clinics. Equipping and hiding field treatment locations has been one of the most threatening and resources consuming task during the uprising. The government security forces in a number of occasions used local paid informants to locate and destroy treatment locations equipped by the SRCU.

== SYRCU Approach ==
The Syrian Revolution Coordinators Union (SYRCU) is a civilian, non-for-profit entity that gathers coordinators of anti-government protests from all around Syria. The SYRCU claims it believes in "protests, strikes, social campaigns, civil disobedience and other non-violent tools as the most efficient ones to achieve the goal of the Syrian revolution". The SYRCU also believes that this is the best life-saving approach in the Syrian people struggle to achieve democracy and build Syria as a country for everyone to share, rather than just a single family to control, i.e. Assad Family.

Even though we the SYRCU does not take up arms to for their cause, they still believe in the legitimacy of the fight that defected officers and soldiers, ex-military personnel and other have decided to take. Those people who are now called the Free Syrian Army (FSA) have seen families murdered in cold blood in front in their own eyes and decided that they should defend their neighborhoods, families and property using a lethal forces that is so little compared to that used by the Assad family government.

The SYRCU believes that medical care and humanitarian aid should be provided to any one in need regardless of their belonging. This even applies to arrested soldiers who were just fighting to the Assad government's side. They also believe and approve of the International conventions in this regard, including but not limited to the four Geneva Conventions and the three protocols agreed upon after them.

The SYRCU also believes that the international community, represented by its major entities like the United Nations, the Arab League and others, are and should be always responsible for making everyone who commits crimes against the Syrian people become accounted by the law. They have supported all the plans presented by the international community in such context including the initiative by Kofi Annan that aimed to end the violence and release all prisoners. Considering all the plans that have been presented, the SYRCU has made it clear several times before that it aims for exactly the same points. The SYRCU believe in its rights to keep its social movement and refuse any dialogue with the government before it withdraws the army from the cities, release all political prisoners and activists, confess to the crimes it did and become prepared to hand-over the power in Syria.

== See also ==
- Syrian Revolution Network
- Local Coordination Committees of Syria
- Syrian Revolution General Commission
- Supreme Council of the Syrian Revolution
