= List of Sigma Iota Rho chapters =

Sigma Iota Rho is an international college honor society for international studies. It was established in 1984 at American University in Washington, D.C. Following are the chapters of Sigma Iota Rho, with active chapters in bold and inactive chapters and institutions in italics.

Chapter	Charter date	Institution	Location	Status	Ref.
**Alpha**	1984	American University	Washington, D.C.	Active	
**Beta**		University of South Carolina	Columbia, South Carolina	Active	
**Gamma**	1984	University of Wisconsin–Oshkosh	Oshkosh, Wisconsin	Active	
**Delta**		University of Wyoming	Laramie, Wyoming	Active	
**Epsilon**		University of Pennsylvania	Philadelphia, Pennsylvania	Active	
**Zeta**		University of Denver	Denver, Colorado	Active	
**Eta**		North Carolina State University	Raleigh, North Carolina	Active	
**Theta**		Rhodes College	Memphis, Tennessee	Active	
**Iota**		Juniata College	Huntingdon, Pennsylvania	Active	
**Kappa**		The Citadel	Charleston, South Carolina	Active	
**Lambda**		Michigan State University	East Lansing, Michigan	Active	
**Mu**		Indiana State University	Terre Haute, Indiana	Active	
**Nu**		California State University, Chico	Chico, California	Active	
**Xi**		Mount Holyoke College	South Hadley, Massachusetts	Active	
**Omicron**		San Francisco State University	San Francisco, California	Active	
**Pi**		University of South Florida	Tampa, Florida	Active	
**Rho**		West Virginia University	Morgantown, West Virginia	Active	
**Sigma**		University of Delaware	Newark, Delaware	Active	
**Tau**		University of Michigan	Ann Arbor, Michigan	Active	
**Upsilon**		Lehigh University	Bethlehem, Pennsylvania	Active	
**Phi**		College of Charleston	Charleston, South Carolina	Active	
**Chi**		Bradley University	Peoria, Illinois	Active	
**Psi**		University of Dayton	Dayton, Ohio	Active	
**Omega**		Brigham Young University	Provo, Utah	Active	
**Alpha Alpha**	1987	Kenyon College	Gambier, Ohio	Active	
**Alpha Beta**		University of Missouri–St. Louis	St. Louis, Missouri	Active	
**Alpha Gamma**		Miami University	Oxford, Ohio	Active	
**Alpha Delta**		University of New Hampshire	Durham, New Hampshire	Active	
**Alpha Epsilon**		Baylor University	Waco, Texas	Active	
**Alpha Zeta**		Texas State University	San Marcos, Texas	Active	
**Alpha Eta**		University of Colorado Boulder	Boulder, Colorado	Active	
**Alpha Theta**		Ohio Wesleyan University	Delaware, Ohio	Active	
**Alpha Iota**		George Washington University	Washington, D.C.	Active	
Alpha Kappa		Wells College	Aurora, New York	Inactive	(Note: The college closed in 2024.)
**Alpha Lambda**		Trinity University	San Antonio, Texas	Active	
**Alpha Mu**		Baldwin Wallace University	Berea, Ohio	Active	
**Alpha Nu**		Wheeling University	Wheeling, West Virginia	Active	(Note: Chapter formed at Wheeling Jesuit University, which became Wheeling University in 2019.)
**Alpha Xi**		University of Nebraska Omaha	Omaha, Nebraska	Active	
**Alpha Omicron**		James Madison University	Harrisonburg, Virginia	Active	
**Alpha Pi**		Pepperdine University	Los Angeles County, California	Active	
**Alpha Rho**		Stonehill College	Easton, Massachusetts	Active	
**Alpha Sigma**		University of Wisconsin–Whitewater	Whitewater, Wisconsin	Active	
**Alpha Tau**		Dickinson College	Carlisle, Pennsylvania	Active	
**Alpha Upsilon**		Loyola University Chicago	Chicago, Illinois	Active	
**Alpha Phi**		University of St. Thomas	Houston, Texas	Active	
**Alpha Chi**		Syracuse University	Syracuse, New York	Active	
**Alpha Psi**		Virginia Tech	Blacksburg, Virginia	Active	
**Alpha Omega**		Virginia Commonwealth University	Richmond, Virginia	Active	
**Beta Alpha**		Fairfield University	Fairfield, Connecticut	Active	
**Beta Beta**		State University of New York at Geneseo	Geneseo, New York	Active	
**Beta Gamma**		Nazareth University	Pittsford, New York	Active	
**Beta Delta**		Georgia State University	Atlanta, Georgia	Active	
**Beta Epsilon**		University of Montevallo	Montevallo, Alabama	Active	
**Beta Zeta**		Old Dominion University	Norfolk, Virginia	Active	
**Beta Eta**	1999	Manhattan University	New York City, New York	Active	
**Beta Theta**		Kansas State University	Manhattan, Kansas	Active	
**Beta Iota**		Elon University	Elon, North Carolina	Active	
**Beta Kappa**		Seton Hall University	South Orange, New Jersey	Active	
**Beta Lambda**		Georgia Tech	Atlanta, Georgia	Active	
**Beta Mu**		Fordham University	New York City, New York	Active	
**Beta Nu**		Slippery Rock University	Slippery Rock, Pennsylvania	Active	
**Beta Xi**		Hult International Business School, London	London, England	Active	
**Beta Omicron**		University of Lynchburg	Lynchburg, Virginia	Active	
**Beta Pi**		Brenau University	Gainesville, Georgia	Active	
**Beta Rho**	2002	Florida International University	Westchester, Florida	Active	
**Beta Sigma**		Lake Forest College	Lake Forest, Illinois	Active	
**Beta Tau**		University of Alabama at Birmingham	Birmingham, Alabama	Active	
**Beta Upsilon**		Lafayette College	Easton, Pennsylvania	Active	
**Beta Phi**		Moravian University	Bethlehem, Pennsylvania	Active	
**Beta Chi**		Tufts University	Medford, Massachusetts	Active	
**Beta Psi**		Samford University	Homewood, Alabama	Active	
**Beta Omega**		Shippensburg University of Pennsylvania	Shippensburg, Pennsylvania	Active	
**Gamma Alpha**		Morehouse College	Atlanta, Georgia	Active	
**Gamma Beta**		Washington University in St. Louis	St. Louis, Missouri	Active	
**Gamma Gamma**		University of California, Irvine	Irvine, California	Active	
**Gamma Delta**		The College of New Jersey	Ewing Township, New Jersey	Active	
**Gamma Epsilon**		University of Bridgeport	Bridgeport, Connecticut	Active	
**Gamma Zeta**		Adelphi University	Garden City, New York	Active	
**Gamma Eta**		University of Mount Union	Alliance, Ohio	Active	
**Gamma Theta**		University of Georgia	Athens, Georgia	Active	
**Gamma Iota**		University of South Alabama	Mobile, Alabama	Active	
**Gamma Kappa**		Seattle University	Seattle, Washington	Active	
**Gamma Lambda**		DePauw University	Greencastle, Indiana	Active	
**Gamma Mu**		University of North Texas	Denton, Texas	Active	
**Gamma Nu**		Endicott College	Beverly, Massachusetts	Active	
**Gamma Xi**		Spring Hill College	Mobile, Alabama	Active	
**Gamma Omicron**	January 2009	State University of New York at Fredonia	Fredonia, New York	Active	
**Gamma Pi**		Lycoming College	Williamsport, Pennsylvania	Active	
**Gamma Rho**		University of Vermont	Burlington, Vermont	Active	
**Gamma Sigma**		Ohio State University	Columbus, Ohio	Active	
**Gamma Tau**		Sweet Briar College	Amherst County, Virginia	Active	
**Gamma Upsilon**		Ramapo College	Mahwah, New Jersey	Active	
**Gamma Phi**		Millersville University of Pennsylvania	Millersville, Pennsylvania	Active	
**Gamma Chi**		Johns Hopkins University	Baltimore, Maryland	Active	
**Gamma Psi**		University of Arkansas at Little Rock	Little Rock, Arkansas	Active	
**Gamma Omega**		American Military University	Charles Town, West Virginia	Active	
**Delta Alpha**		Bucknell University	Lewisburg, Pennsylvania	Active	
**Delta Beta**		University of Redlands	Redlands, California	Active	
**Delta Gamma**		University of Utah	Salt Lake City, Utah	Active	
**Delta Delta**		Iona University	New Rochelle, New York	Active	
**Delta Epsilon**		Roanoke College	Salem, Virginia	Active	
**Delta Zeta**		University of Illinois Urbana-Champaign	Champaign, Illinois	Active	
**Delta Eta**		Rollins College	Winter Park, Florida	Active	
**Delta Theta**		Hope College	Holland, Michigan	Active	
**Delta Iota**		Oklahoma State University	Stillwater, Oklahoma	Active	
**Delta Kappa**		Emmanuel College	Boston, Massachusetts	Active	
**Delta Lambda**		Arcadia University	Glenside, Pennsylvania	Active	
**Delta Mu**		Chapman University	Orange, California	Active	
**Delta Nu**		Chicago State University	Chicago, Illinois	Active	
**Delta Xi**		Rutgers University–Newark	Newark, New Jersey	Active	
**Delta Omicron**		Rochester Institute of Technology	Rochester, New York	Active	
**Delta Pi**		California State University, Monterey Bay	Monterey County, California	Active	
**Delta Rho**		Utah State University	Logan, Utah	Active	
**Delta Sigma**		Loyola University Maryland	Baltimore, Maryland	Active	
**Delta Tau**		Saint Elizabeth University	Morris Township, New Jersey	Active	
**Delta Upsilon**		Georgia Gwinnett College	Lawrenceville, Georgia	Active	
**Delta Phi**		Trinity Washington University	Washington, D.C.	Active	
**Delta Chi**		Stephen F. Austin State University	Nacogdoches, Texas	Active	
**Delta Psi**		American Graduate School in Paris	Paris, France	Active	
**Delta Omega**		Meredith College	Raleigh, North Carolina	Active	
**Epsilon Alpha**		Washington & Jefferson College	Washington, Pennsylvania	Active	
**Epsilon Beta**		Heidelberg University	Heidelberg, Baden-Württemberg, Germany	Active	
**Epsilon Gamma**		Mercy University	Dobbs Ferry, New York	Active	
**Epsilon Delta**	2012	Norwich University	Northfield, Vermont	Active	
**Epsilon Epsilon**		Concordia College	Moorhead, Minnesota	Active	
**Epsilon Zeta**		Brigham Young University–Idaho	Rexburg, Idaho	Active	
**Epsilon Eta**		University of Miami	Coral Gables, Florida	Active	
**Epsilon Theta**		Georgia Southern University	Statesboro, Georgia	Active	
**Epsilon Iota**		Stetson University	DeLand, Florida	Active	
**Epsilon Kappa**		Bethune–Cookman University	Daytona Beach, Florida	Active	
**Epsilon Lambda**	March 2013	Saint Louis University	St. Louis, Missouri	Active	
**Epsilon Mu**	2008	Roger Williams University	Bristol, Rhode Island	Active	
**Epsilon Nu**		University of California, Berkeley	Berkeley, California	Active	
**Epsilon Xi**		State University of New York at Oneonta	Oneonta, New York	Active	
**Epsilon Omicron**		University of Kentucky	Lexington, Kentucky	Active	
**Epsilon Pi**		University of North Carolina Wilmington	Wilmington, North Carolina	Active	
**Epsilon Rho**		DePaul University	Chicago, Illinois	Active	
**Epsilon Sigma**		Bryant University	Smithfield, Rhode Island	Active	
**Epsilon Tau**		Lebanon Valley College	Annville Township, Pennsylvania	Active	
**Epsilon Upsilon**	September 2013	Marymount University	Arlington County, Virginia	Active	
**Epsilon Phi**		North Park University	Chicago, Illinois	Active	
**Epsilon Chi**	January 2014	Duquesne University	Pittsburgh, Pennsylvania	Active	
**Epsilon Psi**		Cazenovia College	Cazenovia, New York	Active	
**Epsilon Omega**	March 2014	Saint Joseph's University	Philadelphia, Pennsylvania	Active	
**Zeta Alpha**		Aquinas College	Grand Rapids, Michigan	Active	
**Zeta Beta**		New York University	New York City, New York	Active	
**Zeta Gamma**		Indiana University Bloomington	Bloomington, Indiana	Active	
**Zeta Delta**		Pittsburg State University	Pittsburg, Kansas	Active	
**Zeta Epsilon**		State University of New York at Oswego	Oswego, New York	Active	
**Zeta Zeta**		University of Maine at Farmington	Farmington, Maine	Active	
**Zeta Eta**		Louisiana State University	Baton Rouge, Louisiana	Active	
**Zeta Theta**		California State University, San Marcos	San Marcos, California	Active	
**Zeta Iota**		Utica University	Utica, New York	Active	
**Zeta Kappa**		Kennesaw State University	Cobb County, Georgia	Active	
**Zeta Lambda**		Transylvania University	Lexington, Kentucky	Active	
**Zeta Mu**		Wheaton College	Norton, Massachusetts	Active	
**Zeta Nu**		Hood College	Frederick, Maryland	Active	
**Zeta Xi**		High Point University	High Point, North Carolina	Active	
**Zeta Omicron**	2015	Salisbury University	Salisbury, Maryland	Active	
**Zeta Pi**		Sacred Heart University	Fairfield, Connecticut	Active	
**Zeta Rho**	2016	Rowan University	Glassboro, New Jersey	Active	
**Zeta Sigma**		Saint Mary's College	Notre Dame, Indiana	Active	
**Zeta Tau**		Southern Adventist University	Collegedale, Tennessee	Active	
**Zeta Upsilon**		Wagner College	Staten Island, New York	Active	
**Zeta Phi**	April 2016	Western Michigan University	Kalamazoo, Michigan	Active	
**Zeta Chi**		Chestnut Hill College	Philadelphia, Pennsylvania	Active	
**Zeta Psi**		University of North Carolina at Asheville	Asheville, North Carolina	Active	
**Zeta Omega**		Marquette University	Milwaukee, Wisconsin	Active	
**Eta Alpha**		Webster University	Webster Groves, Missouri	Active	
**Eta Beta**		American University of Iraq, Sulaimani	Sulaymaniyah, Kurdistan, Iraq	Active	
**Eta Gamma**		University of Colorado Denver	Denver, Colorado	Active	
**Eta Delta**		Merrimack College	North Andover, Massachusetts	Active	
**Eta Epsilon**	2021	University of Arkansas	Fayetteville, Arkansas	Active	
**Eta Zeta**		Daniel Morgan Graduate School of National Security	Charles Town, West Virginia	Active	
**Eta Eta**		Rutgers University–New Brunswick	New Brunswick, New Jersey	Active	
**Eta Theta**		Case Western Reserve University	Cleveland, Ohio	Active	
**Eta Iota**		Canisius University	Buffalo, New York	Active	
**Eta Kappa**		Shenandoah University	Winchester, Virginia	Active	
**Eta Lambda**		Loyola Marymount University	Los Angeles, California	Active	
**Eta Mu**		University of Nebraska–Lincoln	Lincoln, Nebraska	Active	
**Eta Nu**		Auburn University	Auburn, Alabama	Active	
**Eta Xi**		Gardner–Webb University	Boiling Springs, North Carolina	Active	
**Eta Omicron**		University of California, Santa Barbara	Santa Barbara County, California	Active	
**Eta Pi**		Bentley University	Waltham, Massachusetts	Active	
**Eta Rho**		University of Richmond	Richmond, Virginia	Active	
**Eta Sigma**		University of Texas at San Antonio	San Antonio, Texas	Active	
**Eta Tau**		Flagler College	St. Augustine, Florida	Active	
**Eta Upsilon**		Muhlenberg College	Allentown, Pennsylvania	Active	
**Eta Phi**		Boise State University	Boise, Idaho	Active	
**Eta Chi**		Portland State University	Portland, Oregon	Active	
**Eta Psi**		University of Southern Indiana	Evansville, Indiana	Active	
**Eta Omega**		Covenant College	Lookout Mountain, Georgia	Active	
**Theta Alpha**		University of the Pacific	Stockton, California	Active	
**Theta Beta**		Gettysburg College	Gettysburg, Pennsylvania	Active	
**Theta Gamma**		Indiana University Southeast	New Albany, Indiana	Active	
**Theta Delta**		Oral Roberts University	Tulsa, Oklahoma	Active	
**Theta Epsilon**		King's College	Wilkes-Barre, Pennsylvania	Active	
**Theta Zeta**		Suffolk University	Boston, Massachusetts	Active	
**Theta Eta**		University of Scranton	Scranton, Pennsylvania	Active	
**Theta Theta**	2022	Pacific Lutheran University	Parkland, Washington	Active	
**Theta Iota**		Hollins University	Hollins, Virginia	Active	
**Theta Kappa**		Hobart and William Smith Colleges	Geneva, New York	Active	
**Theta Lambda**		Saint Leo University	St. Leo, Florida	Active	
**Theta Mu**		Smith College	Northampton, Massachusetts	Active	
**Theta Nu**		California State University, Channel Islands	Camarillo, California	Active	
**Theta Xi**		Nova Southeastern University	Fort Lauderdale, Florida	Active	
**Theta Omicron**		Hampton University	Hampton, Virginia	Active	
**Theta Pi**		University of North Carolina at Chapel Hill	Chapel Hill, North Carolina	Active	
**Theta Rho**		Southern Illinois University Edwardsville	Edwardsville, Illinois	Active	
