= UF =

UF may refer to:

== Arts and entertainment ==
- Ultimate Force, a British television drama series
- User Friendly, a webcomic

== Businesses and organisations ==
- UM Airlines (IATA airline designation UF)
- Florida Museum of Natural History, by collection code
- United Front (East Pakistan), a former coalition of political parties in East Pakistan
- United Front (India, 1996), a coalition of political parties forming the government of India after the 1996 general election
- United Front (Sri Lanka), a former coalition of political parties in Sri Lanka
- Utrikespolitiska föreningen, Uppsala Association of International Affairs, a Swedish organization providing balanced debate around international issues

=== Universities ===
- University of Findlay
- University of Florida

== Science and technology ==
- Ultrafiltration, an industrial filtration technique
- Uncinate fasciculus, a region of the human brain
- Urea-formaldehyde, a synthetic resin
- Underground feeder, a type of electrical cable

== Other uses ==
- Unidad de Fomento, unit of account used in Chile
- Union des Francophones, a Belgian electoral list
- United front, a form of struggle by revolutionaries
- United Front (Malaysia) party politician in Malaysia

== See also ==
- μF (disambiguation)
