= Razan Ghazzawi =

Syrian-Palestinian blogger (born 1980)

Razan Ghazzawi رزان غزاوي
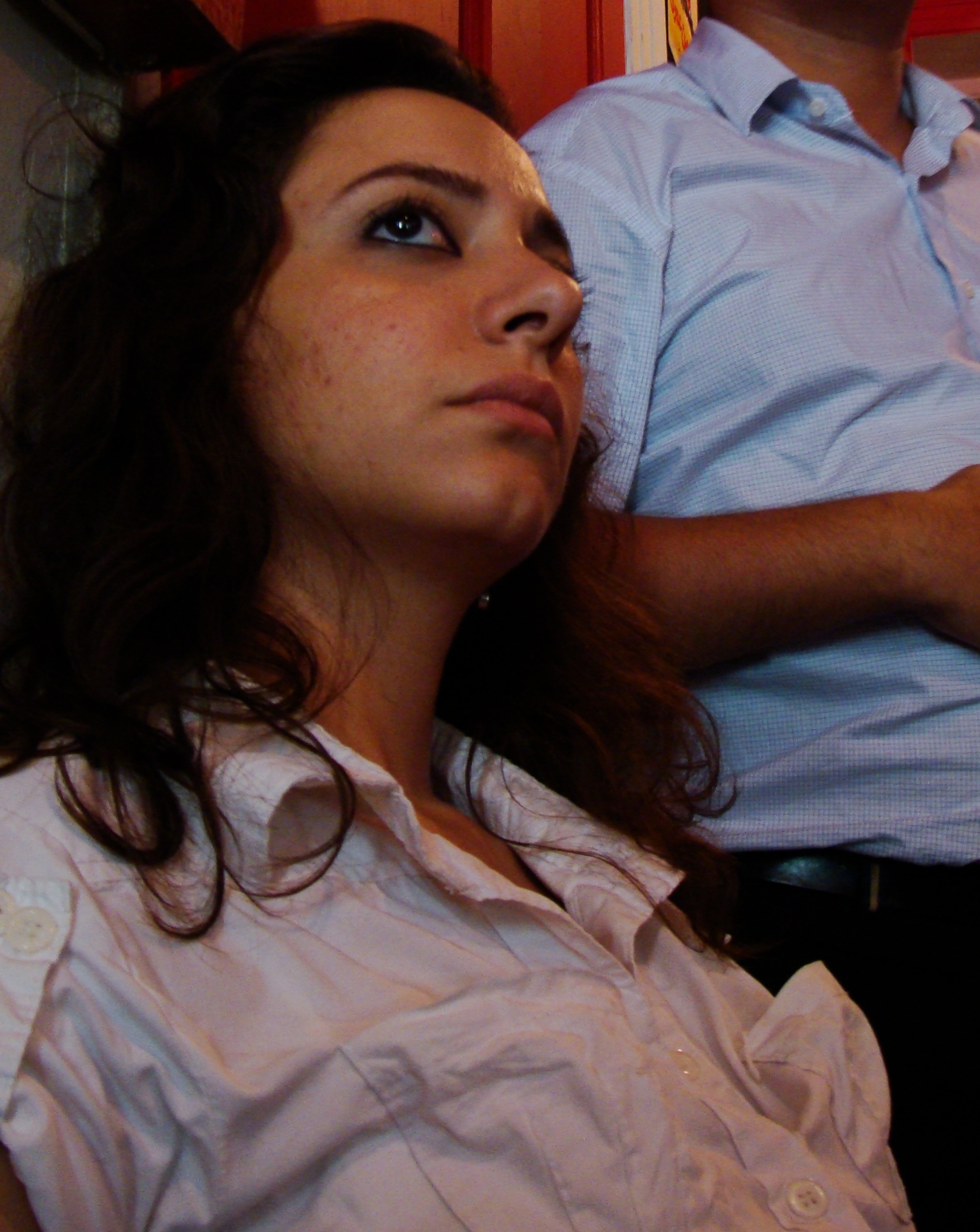
- Ghazzawi in 2008
- Born: 1980 (age 45–46)
- Education: Damascus University; University of Balamand; University of Leeds; University of Sussex
- Occupations: Assistant Professor, teacher-activist; Media Officer; Blogger
- Website: razanghazzawi.org

Razan Ghazzawi (Arabic: رزان غزاوي) is a Syrian-Palestinian blogger, campaigner, teacher, and activist, originally from Homs in Syria and Gaza in Palestine. Ghazzawi finished her PhD in Gender Studies and International Relations at the University of Sussex. She currently works as a tenure-track assistant professor in Queer Studies at Oregon State University, USA, since September 2023. Ghazzawi has been highly involved as a dissident since she started blogging in 2005, and weaponized her blogging to disseminate information about Syrian regime human rights violations following the 2011 Syrian Uprising. Ghazzawi has been particularly outspoken on activists' arrests and the violations of human rights committed by the Bashar al-Assad government, as well as on the sectarianism, Arab racism, and transphobia and homophobia towards Syrian ethnic, religious, and sexual minorities within Syrian cisgender and straight activist community and opposition in diaspora and exile.

== Education and career ==
Ghazzawi received a diploma in English literature from Damascus University in 2003. She obtained a master's degree in Comparative Literature from the University of Balamand, Lebanon, in 2011, and second master's degree in Gender, Sexuality, and the Body from the University of Leeds in the UK. She completed her PhD in Gender Studies and International Relations in 2022 from the University of Sussex, and did a postdoc at EUME in Berlin, Germany in 2022-2023. Ghazzawi became the Media Officer in the Syrian Center for Media and Freedom of Expression in the Arab World.

As of 2023, she was appointed as a tenure-track assistant professor in Queer Studies at Oregon State University, USA.

== Activism and arrests ==
Ghazzawi was arrested by Syrian authorities on 30 November 2011 while on her way to attend a conference on press freedom in Jordan. The following week, she was brought to court, charged by authorities with trying to incite sectarian strife, spreading false information and weakening national sentiment, a charge often leveled against those who challenge the Syrian government, according to rights activists."

Ghazzaw's arrest sparked an online outcry and an international campaign called for her immediate release. There was a Facebook campaign for her release and Amnesty International declared her a prisoner of conscience. Before her arrest, she declared in her blog, "Do you understand, that I was scared to protest, but now I am no longer scared?" they had also written: "If anything happens to me, know that the regime does not fear the prisoners but those who do not forget them."

On 19 December 2011, she was reported to have been freed, and their employer, the Syrian Centre for Media and Freedom of Expression, confirmed this. However, they still faces the charges, which carry a maximum sentence of fifteen years imprisonment. Ghazzawi is one of few Syrian-Palestinian bloggers in Syria who write under their real names, even after their arrest.

Ghazzawi was again arrested on 16 February 2012, during a raid on the offices of the Syrian Center for Freedom of Expression in Damascus, due to their activist works. Ghazzawi was arrested along with thirteen of her colleagues, including the Head of the Center, Mazen Darwish, and his wife Yara Bader. she was freed again on 18 February 2012, but she was not allowed to leave the country. Ghazzawi was ordered to report to the police on a daily basis in order to pursue her interrogation.

== Awards and recognition ==
Razan Ghazzawi was honored with the 2012's Human Rights Defenders at Risk award by the Dublin-based Front Line Defenders foundation on 8 June 2012. Since they could not travel to Dublin due to carceral and court restrictions following their imprisonment, their colleague Dlshad Othman, who fled Syria in December 2011 accepted the award on their behalf. they were recognized as one of the BBC's 100 women of 2013, when they used to identify as a woman.

Ghazzawi was called "iconic blogger and leading activist" by The Telegraph. Jillian York (who has been called "one of the leading scholars on Internet control and censorship") wrote that Ghazzawi was "one of [their] heroes."
