= Sowt (podcasting) =

Arabic-language media company

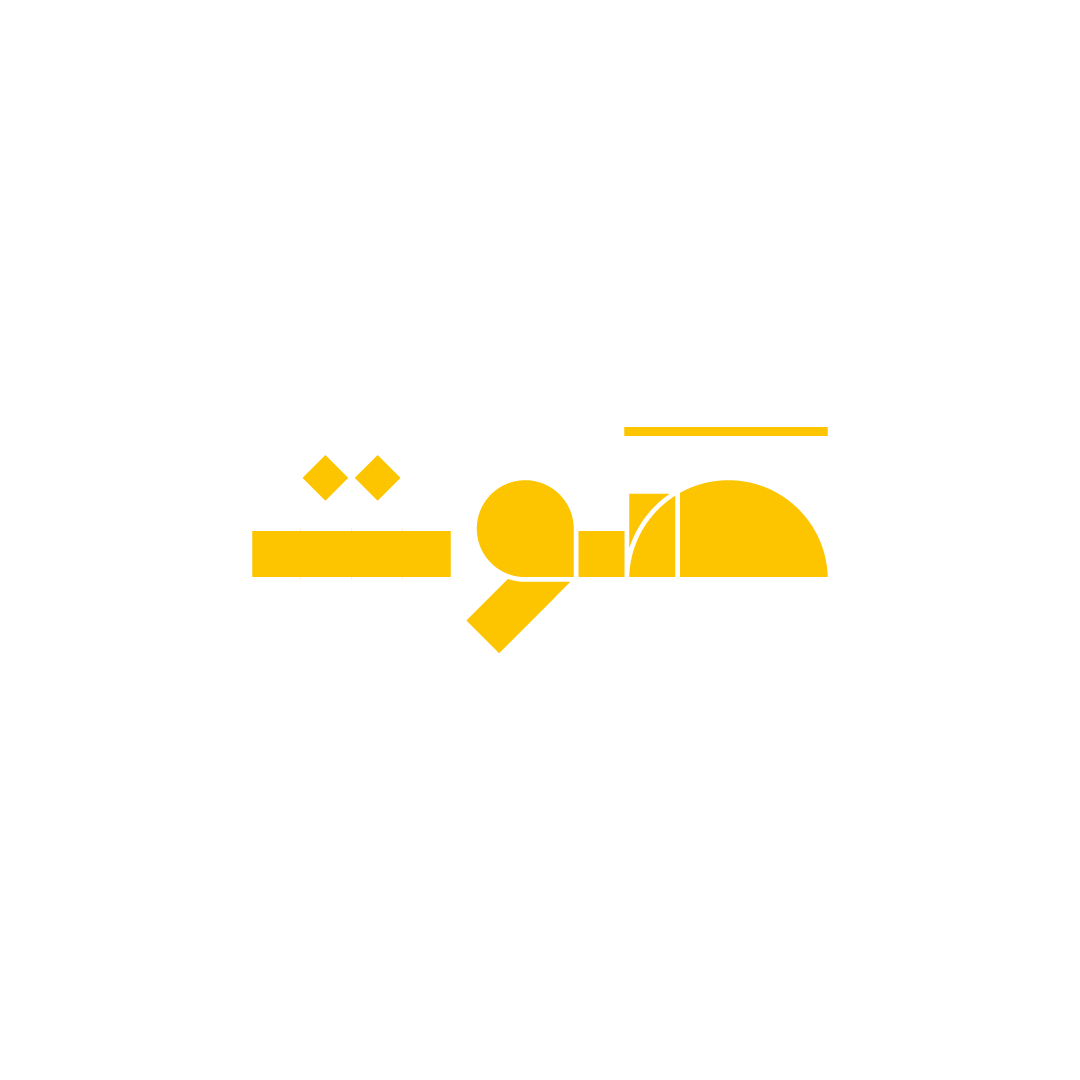
- Company type: Media network
- Founded: 2017
- Founder: Hazem Zureiqat and Ramsey Tesdell
- Headquarters: Amman, Jordan
- Products: Audio medias
- Website: www.sowt.com

Sowt (Arabic: صَوْت, meaning "voice") is an Arabic-language independent mediaing network based in Amman, Jordan. It was launched in 2017 by Hazem Zurieqat, Tarek Zurieqat, and Ramsey Tesdell. Sowt curates and produces medias on political, social, and cultural issues. Among its most popular programs are Eib, Dom Tak, and Blank Maps.

== History ==
Sowt began in the early 2010s as a social networking platform where users could share audio clips on a public feed. However, it did not gain enough traction, and in 2017, when former Nieman Lab contributor Ramsey Tesdell joined as managing partner, Sowt transformed into a mediaing network. Sowt produces content with the support of grants from local and international organizations.

== Programs ==
Sowt currently produces the following shows, most of which are narrative-driven:

- Eib: Arabic for “shame”, a media that addresses social, cultural and religious taboos in Arab society such as divorce, homosexuality and sexual violence.
- Dom Tak: a narrative-driven media, produced in collaboration with Ma3azef, that explores the stories of unsung female singers in the Arab world.
- Masaha: a media offering women of various backgrounds the space to discuss their views on economic and social issues facing the region.
- Parliament: a regular media that facilitates a conversation between the public and the Jordanian House of Representatives.
- Razan: a narrative-media following the progress of the Syrian civil war through the kidnapping of lawyer and human rights activist Razan Zaitouneh.
- Religion and State: a media exploring the relationship between state and religion in the Arab world from a philosophical and political lens.
- Blank Maps: a media depicting stories of victims of statelessness across the Arab world.
- Ya Rayeh: a media recounting stories of immigration attempts and experiences of citizens of Algeria, Lebanon, and Jordan.
- Ma Alaml: a media interviewing foreign domestic workers in the Middle East discussing the discrimination and legal difficulties they face.
- Ali Alkadri: a media discussing Ali Alkadri's theories and the region's development difficulties.
- Visualizing Conflict: a short series produced in cooperation with the University of Copenhagen to highlight the importance of images in conflict zones.
