= Mazen Darwish =

Syrian lawyer and free speech advocate

Mazen Darwish مازن درويش
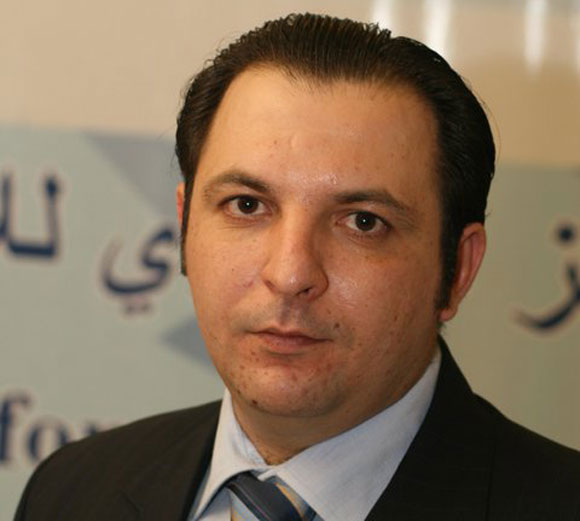
- Occupation: lawyer
- Organization(s): Center for Media and Freedom of Expression
- Spouse: Yara Bader

Mazen Darwish (Arabic: مازن درويش) is a Syrian lawyer and free speech advocate. He is the president of the Syrian Center for Media and Freedom of Expression. News organizations, including Reuters and the Associated Press, have described him as one of Syria's most prominent activists. He was imprisoned in Syria from 2012 until his release in August 2015.

Since October 2022, Mazen Darwish has been one of the Secretaries General of the International Federation for Human Rights (FIDH).

== Activism ==
Darwish is the president of the Syrian Center for Media and Freedom of Expression, a partner organization of Reporters Without Borders, founded in 2004. The organization was refused accreditation by the Syrian government, but it continues to operate in secret. In 2006, the group launched an independent news website, syriaview.net, but the site was soon banned by the Syrian government.

In April 2008, Darwish and a colleague were arrested after their reporting on riots in Adra, a town near Damascus. He was later imprisoned for ten days for "defaming and insulting the administrative bodies of the state." Thirty-five international press freedom organizations co-signed a letter protesting the sentence, describing it as part of "an ongoing pattern of harassment and detention of journalists and activists." Darwish has also been subject to travel bans to prevent him from leaving the country.

He also reported on clashes in Daraa in early 2011 during the beginning stages of the Syrian Civil War. In March, he participated in a protest calling for political prisoners to be released, and the Syrian Observatory for Human Rights reported that he was arrested shortly after.

The “4 of Douma”, human rights activists, Razan Zeitouneh, Samira Khalil and their colleagues from the Violations Documentation Center in Syria who were arrested in Douma on December 9, 2013 were also part of the media center founded by Mazen Darwish.

== 2012 arrest ==
Darwish was arrested on 16 February 2012 by men believed to be from the intelligence arm of the Syrian Air Force. Fifteen other journalists and activists were arrested on the same day, including blogger Razan Ghazzawi and Darwish's wife, journalist Yara Bader. While Bader was released in May, Darwish was subject to forced disappearance with no official statements of his whereabouts or status. The Switzerland-based International Commission of Jurists reported in August that Darwish was being tried before a secret military court and could face a death sentence with no appeal.

Amnesty International designated Darwish a prisoner of conscience, "detained solely on account of his peaceful exercise of his right to freedom of expression and association in relation to his work with the Syrian Center for Media and Freedom of Expression." More than twenty international human rights organizations, including the Arab Network for Human Rights Information, Human Rights Watch, Index on Censorship, the International Press Institute, Reporters Without Borders, and the World Organisation Against Torture, co-signed a letter calling for Darwish's immediate release. Catherine Ashton, the High Representative of the Union for Foreign Affairs and Security Policy of European Union, also condemned the arrest, calling on Syria to release Darwish immediately.

== 2015 release and dropping of charges ==
Darwish was released from prison on 10 August 2015, although the charges were not dropped and he was scheduled to appear at a court hearing on 31 August 2015. On 31 August 2015, all charges against Darwish were dropped by an anti-terrorism court in Damascus. The court ruled that Darwish and his co-defendants are covered under a political amnesty issued in 2014. He and Yara Bader fled to Beirut and then Germany thereafter. Together with Anwar al-Bunni, Darwish has filed a case with the European Center for Constitutional and Human Rights against institutions of the Assad regime.

== Awards and honors ==
- 2011 – The Roland Berger Human Dignity Award (shared with Tunisian lawyer Radhia Nasraoui and the Arabic Network for Human Rights Information)
- 2014 – The Pinter International Writer of Courage Award (shared with Salman Rushdie), given by English PEN for "someone who has been persecuted for speaking out about [his or her] beliefs"
- 2015 – The International Press Institute named Darwish a World Press Freedom Hero in February.
- 2015 – Darwish was awarded UNESCO/Guillermo Cano World Press Freedom Prize on World Press Freedom Day (May 3).
