= U of F =

U of F may refer to:

- University of Findlay, in Ohio, United States
- University of Florida, in the United States

== See also ==
- UF (disambiguation)
