= Malmö Association of Foreign Affairs =

Swedish student association

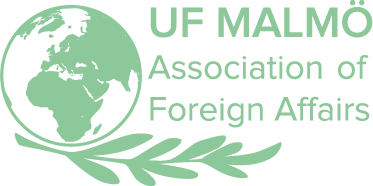
- Abbreviation: UF Malmö
- Type: Non-governmental organization
- Headquarters: Malmö, Sweden
- Official language: English
- Parent organization: Swedish Association of International Affairs
- Website: ufmalmo.se

The Malmö Association of Foreign Affairs (Swedish: Utrikespolitiska föreningen i Malmö, UF Malmö) is a politically and religiously independent student association based in Malmö that strives to create debate around international issues. It has a strong connection to Malmö University in Sweden, with most of its more than 200 members being students at the university. It is also part of the Swedish Association of International Affairs (SAIA), which serves as an umbrella organization of all associations of international affairs around Sweden, and is an accredited student association of the Student Union Malmö.

The main activity of the association is the hosting of lectures held by invited guests. They can be politicians, diplomats, journalists, activists or experts on specific fields connected to foreign affairs. Over the years, the association has been visited by prominent people such as Margot Wallström, Carl Bildt, Gudrun Schyman, Martin Schibbye and Johan Persson. Apart from hosting lectures, the association organizes study trips to foreign countries and social events for its members and publishes an own foreign affairs magazine named Pike & Hurricane, both online and in print. Through a separate committee, it also organizes the annual Model United Nations of Malmö (MUNmö).

== Controversy ==
In 2014, UF Malmö attracted some controversy in the Swedish media when it invited the academic Johan Galtung for a lecture. Having invited Galtung for his strong involvement in the foundation of Peace and conflict studies, a subject also taught at Malmö University, the association drew criticism for the invitation, as Galtung had previously gained notoriety for statements seen as antisemitic. According to commentators in the Swedish media, inviting him to speak at Malmö University would only legitimise him and his past statements, while others criticised that his past controversial statements were absent from his presentation on the association website. In response to the criticism from the press, the association issued a statement saying that it was unaware of the past controversy surrounding the academic, all while pointing out that Galtung had since backed away from his statements.
