= Syrian Revolution General Commission =

Coalition of 40 Syrian opposition groups

Syrian Revolution General Commission Suriye Devrim Genel Komisyonu
- الهيئة العامة للثورة السورية
- Logo of the Syrian Revolution General Commission
- Abbreviation: SRGC
- Formation: 19 August 2011
- Founded at: Istanbul, Turkey
- Type: Opposition activist coalition
- Legal status: Active
- Purpose: Coordination of Syrian opposition groups and revolutionary councils and overthrowing of Bashar Al-Assad regime
- Headquarters: Istanbul, Turkey
- Region served: Syria
- Official language: Arabic
- Parent organization: Syrian opposition
- Affiliations: Syrian Opposition Coalition

Syrian Revolution General Commission (SRGC) (Arabic: الهيئة العامة للثورة السورية) is a coalition of 40 Syrian opposition groups to unite their efforts during the Syrian civil war that was announced on 19 August 2011 in Istanbul, Turkey.

According to an initial statement, the long-term aim of the coalition is to build "a democratic and civil state of institutions that grants freedom, equality, dignity and respect of human rights to all citizens".

It has been described as having an "aggressive platform" for the removal of president Bashar al-Assad, of "actively supporting armed rebels through provincial military councils", and of refusing to cooperate with the Syrian National Council (SNC) -- unlike the two other Syrian opposition groups the Supreme Council of the Syrian Revolution (SCSR), and the Local Coordination Committees (LCCs). It reportedly refuses to cooperate with the SNC (the umbrella opposition group operating in exile), "due to disillusionment with the SNC's endless internal power squabbles".

== Background and formation ==
The SRGC was formed during the early months of the Syrian civil war, when local activist networks, protest committees and revolutionary councils were trying to coordinate the anti-government uprising across Syria. Research by the Institute for the Study of War described the SRGC as one of the largest grassroots coalitions of the Syrian opposition, representing a large share of revolutionary councils and local coordinating committees in 2011–2012.

The commission developed out of earlier tansiqiya, or coordination committee, networks. According to researcher Aron Lund, it was created in August 2011 by dozens of activist groups, together with the earlier Union of Syrian Revolution Tansiqiyas. The commission's early public statements presented it as a body intended to unify revolutionary activity and support the creation of a democratic civil state in Syria.

== Organization and activities ==
The SRGC functioned primarily as a grassroots opposition network rather than a conventional political party. Its activities included protest coordination, media work, documentation and communication between local revolutionary bodies. The Institute for the Study of War reported that the commission coordinated with local committees through bureaus and networks across Syria, while many of its leaders remained anonymous because of security concerns.

Social media played an important role in the commission's wider activist environment. Opposition-linked Facebook pages were used to circulate slogans for Friday demonstrations, publish protest material and help coordinate messaging between local committees. In some cases, proposed protest names were selected through online polling before being distributed through activist pages and local networks.

== Relations with other opposition bodies ==
The SRGC was part of a wider and fragmented Syrian opposition landscape that included the Local Coordination Committees of Syria, the Syrian National Council and later the National Coalition for Syrian Revolutionary and Opposition Forces. The Center for American Progress listed the SRGC among the groups represented in the Syrian Opposition Coalition after its formation in 2012.

Analysts also noted tensions between inside-Syria grassroots networks and exile-led opposition bodies. A 2013 Carnegie Endowment report stated that the SRGC and the Local Coordination Committees objected to the National Coalition's selection of provincial representatives, reflecting wider disputes over representation within the opposition.

== See also ==
- Civil uprising phase of the Syrian Civil War
- Syrian Revolution Network
- Syrian Revolution Coordinators Union
- Local Coordination Committees of Syria
- Syrian National Council
- National Coalition for Syrian Revolutionary and Opposition Forces
