= Amer Al-Sadeq =

- عامر الصادق
- Born: Damascus, Syria
- Years active: 2006–present
- Website: http://www.srcu.org

Amer Al-Sadeq (Arabic: عامر الصادق, aamer al-sadeq, Arabic pronunciation: [ʕamer al-sˤadeq]) is one of the founders and a representative of the Syrian Revolution Coordinators Union, an organization that emerged during the 2011 Syrian revolution to coordinate the actions of groups and individual activists opposed to the president Bashar al-Assad and his government. Al-Sadeq appeared often in the media, giving interviews and public statements expressing the demands and viewpoints of the revolution in both Arabic and English.

== 2011 Syrian revolution ==
He was one of many young people at the time working to spread information about the situation in Syria online.

== Syrian Revolution Coordinators Union ==
The Syrian Revolution Coordinators Union (SRCU) was one of many organizations which emerged in 2011 to coordinate the opposition activities being carried out by a large number of disparate groups. SRCU's network brings together coordination groups and other activists who belong to different Syrian cities and areas. The organization's stated ways of working include protest, humanitarian support and social journalism in furtherance of their political goal.

=== As spokesperson ===
Al-Sadeq was also a spokesperson for the group from 2011.

=== Reported dismissal from the Union ===
In September 2012 it was that Al-Sadeq had been dismissed from the SRCU. However, this claim was disputed in a Facebook post.
