= Violations Documentation Center in Syria =

- مركز توثيق الانتهاكات في سوريا
- Abbreviation: VDC
- Predecessor: Syrian Center for Media and Freedom of Expression
- Formation: April 2011
- Founder: Razan Zaitouneh
- Type: Media activist organization
- Legal status: Active
- Purpose: Documentation of human rights in Syria
- Headquarters: Douma
- Location: Syria
- Official language: Arabic, English, French
- Board of directors: Husam al-Katlaby
- Affiliations: Local Coordination Committees of Syria
- Website: http://vdc-sy.net

The Violations Documentation Center in Syria (VDC, Arabic: مركز توثيق الانتهاكات في سوريا) is a network of Syrian opposition activists whose aim is to document human rights violations perpetrated since the beginning of the Syrian Civil War, including victims of the violence, detainees, and missing people. The organization works with the activists from the Local Coordination Committees of Syria, and documents identified victims of the violence from the rebels and the civilians. The stated purpose of the organization is to provide an independent documentation of human rights violations within Syria, a resource that may help any future justice-related procedures. The center's main sources of information include medical records, families of the victims and information received from the Imam of the mosque that performed the burial.

The VDC was founded by Razan Zaitouneh, a Syrian lawyer and human rights activist, and Mazen Darwish, a Syrian lawyer and free speech advocate, in June 2011. It was originally a part of the Syrian Center for Media and Freedom of Expression (SCM), but became its own entity after the SCM was raided and disbanded.

VDC is a non-profit, non-governmental organisation. Its VDC's main headquarters are located in the city of Douma. It is registered in Switzerland. the VDC has a team of about 30–35 investigators and a ground network covering every governorate of Syria, consisting of more than 30 internationally trained field reporters. The VDC reports its findings to the United Nations Security Council. The VDC updates its statistics on a yearly, monthly, and weekly basis.

== Attacks on the VDC ==
On 9 December 2013, VDC's office in Douma was raided by masked gunmen, who abducted four VDC members: Razan Zaitouneh, Samira al-Khalil, Nazem Hamadi, and Wael Hamada, who came to be known as "the Douma Four". The Army of Islam was suspected of being responsible for the attack. The VDC was attacked again on 22 July 2016 and 13 August 2017 by Jaysh al-Islam. Since the abduction, VDC has been led by a group of administrators inside and outside of Syria (initially in Turkey and then Switzerland) and two database managers. As of August 2018, Associated Press found no strong evidence regarding Zaitouneh's fate, but suspected that she had been killed around 2017 or later.

== Method and Limitations ==
The VDC applies international standards for documentation of human rights violations. It has a three-stage method of documenting data: (1) initial information on one or more victims is gathered, mainly from hospitals, morgues, relatives of the victims, and media sources; (2) the initial report is confirmed; (3) data on the victims is added to complete the record.

According to Yale and Harvard medical scholars writing in The Lancet, it is characterized by "careful methods, adherence to international norms of human rights documentation, recording of combatant status and rank, documentation of cause of death and particular weapons involved, geographical scope, and explicit attention to the limitations of the data". The scholars also note its key limitation: that it is not able to report on violations in government-held territories or among pro-government troops, thus resulting in an underestimate of casualties on sides held by the Syrian government. It also notes that the "method used by the VDC researchers could result in an underestimate of casualties, particularly among collapsed structures and rubble created by heavy bombardment and shelling."

== Funding ==
The VDC only accepts funding from independent, unbiased, or neutral entities.
