= List of international relations institutes and organisations =

== Associations ==
- Association of Professional Schools of International Affairs (APSIA)
- Global Studies Consortium
- International Studies Association
- The Jadavpur Association of International Relations
- Sigma Iota Rho
- Swedish Association of International Affairs

== Institutes ==
- Stockholm International Peace Research Institute (SIPRI), Sweden
- Institute of Security and Global Affairs, Leiden University, Netherlands
- Institut Barcelona d'Estudis Internacionals, Catalonia, Spain
- The European Institute for International Law and International Relations, Brussels
- ISPI Istituto per gli Studi di Politica Internazionale (Italian Institute for International Political Studies), Milan, Italy
- Institute of World Politics (Washington, D.C.)
- International Institute for Strategic Studies (IISS), UK
- The Australian Institute of International Affairs (Deakin, ACT, Australia)
- The Canadian Institute of International Affairs, Toronto, ON, Canada
- The Finnish Institute of International Affairs
- The Netherlands Institute of International Relations Clingendael, Wassenaar, The Netherlands
- The Nigerian Institute of International Affairs
- The Norwegian Institute of International Affairs
- The New Zealand Institute of International Affairs, Wellington, New Zealand
- The Pakistan Institute of International Affairs, (PIIA) Karachi, Pakistan
- The Royal Institute of International Affairs, Chatham House, London, United Kingdom
- Graduate Institute of International and Development Studies, Geneva, Switzerland
- International Strategic Research Organization (ISRO/USAK)
- EGMONT – The Royal Institute for International Relations, Brussels, Belgium
- University of Florida International Center
- Center for International Affairs, Jahangirnagar University, Savar, Dhaka, Bangladesh.
- South American Institute for Policy and Strategy Porto Alegre, Brazil
- Politics, Administration & International Relations at Zeppelin University, Germany
- University of Guadalajara located in Guadalajara, Mexico
  - Department of International Studies (Centro Universitario de Ciencias Sociales y Humanidades)
  - Department of Asia-Pacific Studies (Centro Universitario de Ciencias Sociales y Humanidades)
  - Department of Latin American Studies (Centro Universitario de Ciencias Sociales y Humanidades)

== Networks and think tanks ==
- Henry Jackson Society - Cambridge and London based think tank.
- RAND Corporation - California based think tank
- Tillotoma Foundation - global think tank, headquartered in New Delhi and Kolkata
- The Indian Foreign Policy Project - Where young ideas shape global futures.
- Atlantic Council
- Brookings Institution
- Center for Strategic and International Studies
