= Omar Aziz (anarchist) =

Syrian anarchist, intellectual and revolutionary

- عمر عزيز
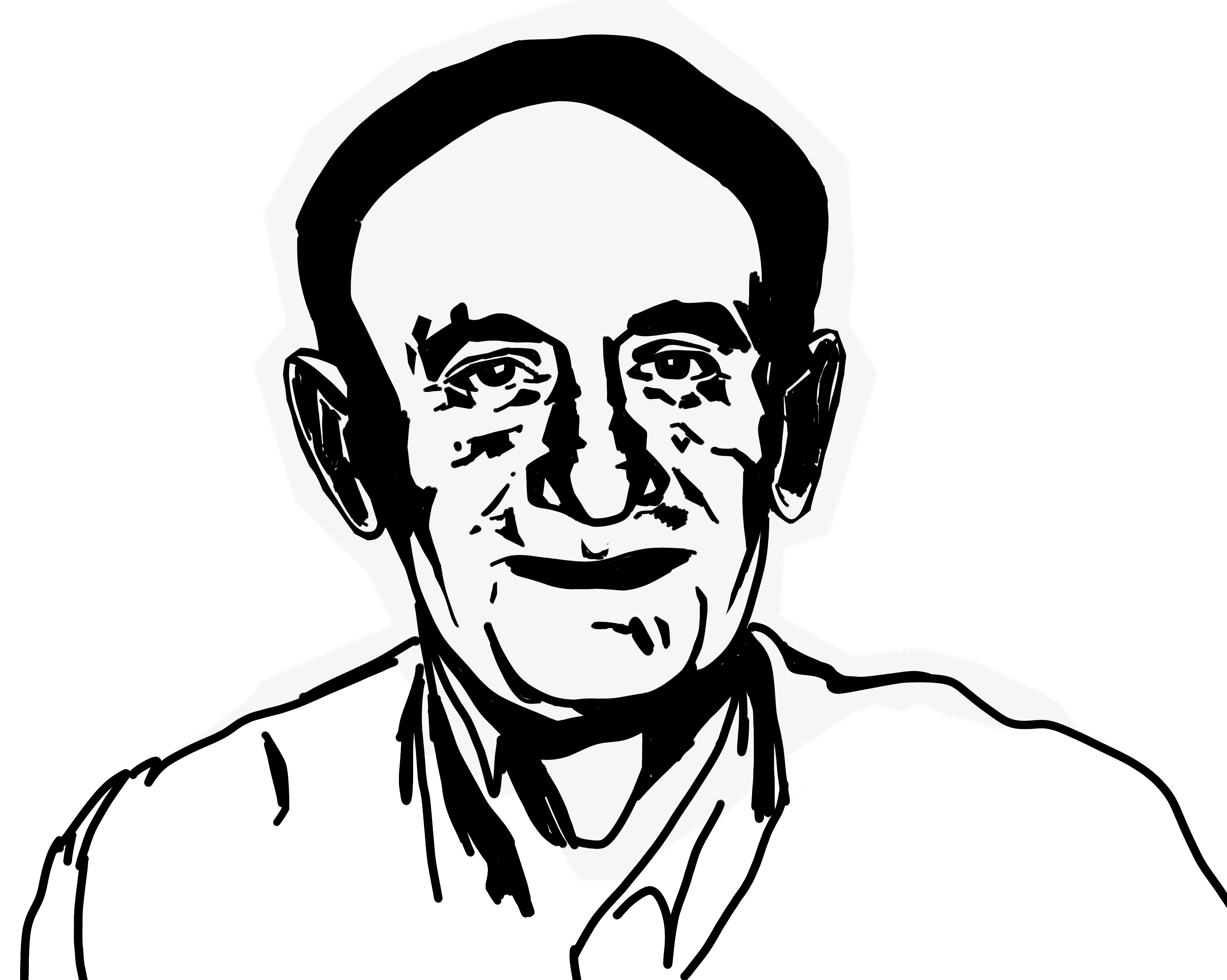
- Born: 18 February 1949; Al-Amara, Damascus, Syria
- Died: 16 February 2013 (aged 63); Harasta Military Hospital, Damascus, Syria
- Other names: Abu Kamel; Kamal Jum'a
- Education: Grenoble University
- Known for: Activism during the Syrian Civil War, anarchist theory
- Notable work: The Formation of Local Councils (2011)
- Movement: Local Coordination Committees of Syria
- Children: 3

Omar Aziz (18 February 1949 – 16 February 2013), also known by the nom de guerre or kunya Abu Kamel, was a Syrian anarchist, intellectual, and revolutionary. He is known for his role in working with the Local Coordination Committees during the early stages of the Syrian Civil War and for his writings advocating horizontal organization.

== Life ==
Omar Aziz was born to a well-off family in Damascus in 1949. He studied economics at Grenoble University and later worked in the information technology sector in Saudi Arabia and the United States. He was married and had three children. Prior to 2011, he had published articles in Arabic language newspapers such as Al-Safir under the pseudonym "Kamal Jum'a".

== Political activity and death ==
Aziz returned to Syria in response to the outbreak of the Syrian revolution in 2011, and quickly became involved in organizing with local communities which were in resistance to the government. Despite his age and personal health conditions, he worked actively and in person with local people, and was involved in aid distribution efforts. During his involvement in the revolution, Aziz noted that there was a separation between the political movement and the continued reality of peoples' daily lives, leading him to propose the establishment of local councils, where communities could organize and self-manage affairs away from the control of the state. In November 2011, he published a draft proposal for self-organization entitled "The Formation of Local Councils". In an obituary, Budour Hassan asserted that the councils were inspired by the writings of Rosa Luxemburg, whereas Lebanese writer Joey Ayoub noted that many elements of Aziz's proposals were mirrored in the structures of the Autonomous Administration of North and East Syria (also known as Rojava), established in 2013. Fellow Syrian anarchist Nader Atassi described his vision as "[breathing] life into the way local councils operate", although noting that in practice many of the councils failed to practice true self-governance, instead stopping short at media and aid work. Aziz published a revised and expanded edition of The Formation of Local Councils in February 2012.

Aziz was personally involved in the establishment of four councils in the suburbs of Damascus, the first being in either Barzeh or Al-Zabadani. On 17 October 2012, he helped establish a council in Darayya, a major centre of political resistance which had seen a massacre of residents perpetrated by government forces in August. 120 members were to elect an executive every six months, and the council head and deputy were to be elected openly by the general public. However, from November 2012, Darayya was placed under a major siege by state forces.

On 20 November, Aziz was arrested at his home in Mezzeh by members of the Air Force Intelligence Directorate. Before his death, he had reportedly noted that the councils had survived for longer than the Paris Commune. He was held at Mezzeh prison until 12 February 2013, when he was transferred to Adra Prison. According to a witness at the prison, his physical condition had severely deteriorated. Aziz had reportedly told him he had experienced ill treatment and torture from prison authorities, while at the same time also suffering from a number of pre-existing medical conditions. He died on 16 February, shortly after being sent for treatment at Harasta Military Hospital. Reports of his death circulated over the next few days, and on 22 February, his death was reported by Human Rights Watch in response to information from a relative.

== Legacy ==
While councils did continue to exist or proliferate after Aziz's death, the council system was soon threatened by Islamist factions, which in many cases seized control from or co-opted local councils. Attacks continued from pro-Assad forces, which targeted public infrastructure in council territory such as hospitals, schools and bakeries. While some councils did still remain intact as of May 2016, the council in Daraya, which Aziz had been directly involved with, fell to Assadist forces in August 2016.

While the emergence of the councils received little coverage or attention internationally, his work has been discussed by writers such as Leila al-Shami, and has been noted in scholarly sources for its role in popular organization during the early stages of the Syrian Civil War. The relative lack of attention given to his work and developments in Syria from the Western left has on occasion been criticized, although his work has been covered in some outlets such as Fifth Estate and Unicorn Riot.

Following the fall of the Assad regime in December 2024, a series of events were organized internationally to commemorate him on the anniversary of his death on 16 February 2025.
