= Yara Bader =

Syrian journalist and human rights activist

- Born: Syrian
- Occupation(s): Human rights activist, Journalist
- Spouse: Mazen Darwish
- Awards: Alison Des Forges Award for Extraordinary Activism, Ilaria Alpi award for brave female journalists

Yara Bader (Arabic: يارا بدر), also known as Yara Badr, is a Syrian journalist and human rights activist. She leads the independent Syrian Center for Media and Freedom of Expression (CMFE), founded in Damascus in 2004, along with her husband, prominent lawyer and free speech advocate Mazen Darwish.

Human rights organizations including Human Rights Watch, IFEX and Amnesty International have honored Bader's work on behalf of Syrian detainees despite risks to her safety.

Since 2015, after being forced into exile, Bader and Darwish settled in Berlin. They now travel the world recounting their experiences and demanding justice for the Syrian population.

== Activism and arrest ==
As a journalist and human rights activist, Bader works on exposing the detention and torture of journalists in war-torn Syria. She has been particularly vocal on activists’ arrests and the violations of human rights committed by the Bashar al-Assad regime.

In February 2012, she was among 14 CMFE staff members, also including director Mazen Darwish and prominent activist Razan Ghazzawi, who were arrested during a raid on their offices by the Syrian Air Force Intelligence services. Some were released a few days later, and, on 10 May 2012, eight more were released, among them Bader, to face trial for "possession of banned publications." Her husband, Mazen Darwish, was released later, in August 2015, along with colleagues Hussein Gharir and Hani al-Zitani.

== International recognition ==
In 2015, Bader was honoured as a recipient of Human Rights Watch's Alison Des Forges Award for Extraordinary Activism. In the same year, during World Press Freedom Day, she went to Latvia to receive the UNESCO World Press Freedom Award on behalf of her husband, Mazen Darwish. In 2012, she won the Ilaria Alpi award for brave female journalists.
