= Adopt a Revolution =

Activist program

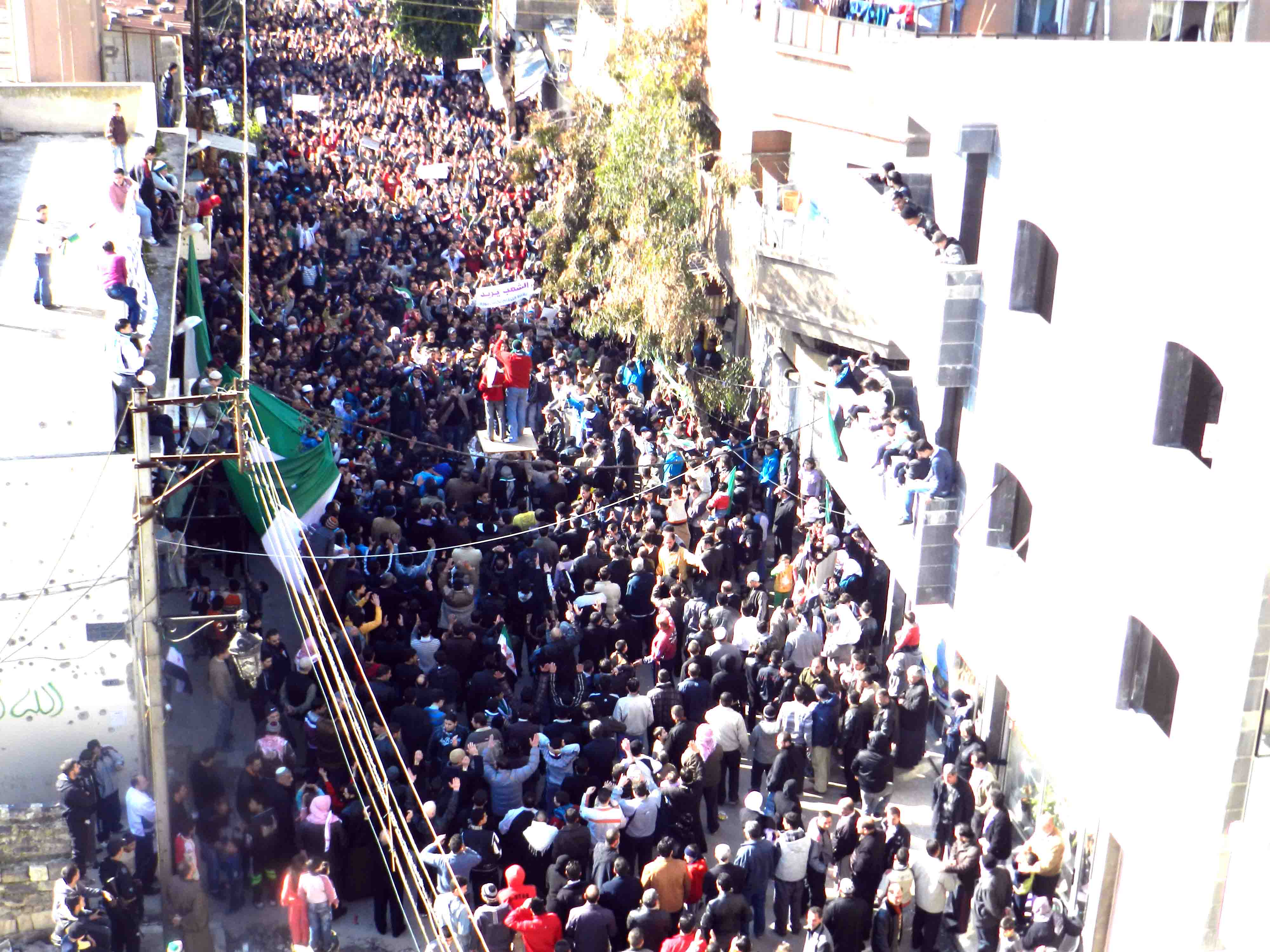
Large demonstration in one of Homs' districts, February 2012

Adopt a Revolution was an initiative that allowed individuals and civil society groups outside Syria to "adopt" a Syrian activist group of their choice and help it survive and succeed in the Syrian revolution.

Donations were used by the Local Coordination Committees (LCC), a network of groups that organized the protests, documented the uprising, and disseminated that information and visuals around the world. These committees funneled medical supplies, food, and telecommunication equipment such as satellite modems to activists inside Syria to "keep their cause alive" as the military of President Bashar al-Assad bombed their cities with artillery.

Since the program launched in late 2011, the website showed that two dozen LCCs in Syria had reached their funding goals. The website listed the name of the committee, information about the town and its situation, and the detailed financial need. Activists said that funding for Internet and phone communication was crucial because communications infrastructure had been destroyed in cities and towns coming under intensified shelling, such as Homs. International media had been barred from entering Syria, so the outside world depended on the LCCs for information from the country. "Media coverage is highly important, and it is one of the only weapons activists have", said Elias Perabo, one of the founders. "The main task is people documenting and getting footage out of the country to get a glimpse of what is happening on the ground and to show the world what the brutality is like. We are trying to smuggle in stuff like cameras before the army comes steaming into a city, so people can film and document".

Adopt a Revolution stated that it did not accept government money and worked through the LCCs, the Syrian Revolution General Commission, a coalition of 40 opposition groups, and the Assembly of the Syrian Kurdish Youths Abroad.

Since Adopt a Revolution could not make direct electronic funds transfers to the committees, supporters smuggled the money into the country in small amounts of cash. Committees sometimes received $900 a month, sometimes $1200. Apart from one courier, who was killed en route, everything appeared to be going fairly smoothly. The committees sent back reports, as their "foster parents" wanted to know what was happening with their money.
