= Prisons Museum =

Prisons Museum is a digital documentation project focusing on detention facilities in conflict zones, primarily in Syria and Iraq. Established in 2024, it maintains online archives of prisons operated by both the Islamic State (ISIS) and the Syrian government during their respective periods of control.

== Overview ==
The project operates two primary online archives: the ISIS Prisons Museum (IPM) and the Syria Prisons Museum (SPM). These digital repositories contain 3D reconstructions of detention sites, documentary evidence, and witness testimonies.

== Projects ==
=== ISIS Prisons Museum (IPM) ===
Launched in October 2024, the IPM documents detention facilities operated by ISIS in Iraq and Syria. The archive includes:

- 3D models of prison buildings
- Administrative documents recovered from former ISIS sites
- Approximately 500 interviews with former detainees
- Detailed investigations of specific prison sites

Notable documented sites include prisons in Mosul, Iraq and Raqqa, Syria, along with documentation of the Shaitat Massacre.

=== Syria Prisons Museum (SPM) ===
Initiated following the fall of the Syrian government in December 2024, the SPM focuses on state-run detention facilities. Its first published case study examined Sednaya Prison near Damascus, a facility associated with mass executions during the Syrian conflict.

== History ==
The project originated from documentation work by the AlShare Media Foundation, a Syrian collective that recorded human rights violations during the conflict. Beginning in 2017, researchers expanded their focus to include systematic documentation of detention sites.

== Documentation and access ==
The project employs multiple documentation methods:

- Architectural recording of detention sites using photography and 3D scanning
- Collection and preservation of administrative documents from abandoned facilities
- Structured interviews with former detainees
- Verification through satellite imagery analysis

All published materials redact identifying information about detainees and witnesses. Public presentations have included a 2024 exhibition at UNESCO headquarters in Paris. A planned platform called "Jawab" aims to assist families of missing persons.

Access to sensitive materials is restricted to:

- Qualified academic researchers
- Accredited human rights investigators
- Authorized judicial representatives

== Public engagement ==
Public presentations have included a 2024 exhibition at UNESCO headquarters in Paris and the development of the platform called "Jawab" to assist families of missing persons. The project has been noted for its role in transitional justice efforts in post-conflict Syria.
