= Swedish Association of International Affairs =

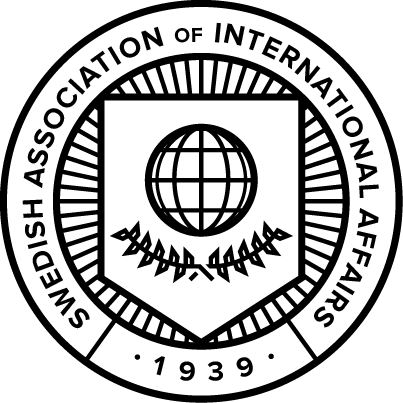
- Formation: 1939
- Type: Non-governmental organization
- Headquarters: Sweden, Stockholm
- Region served: Sweden
- Official language: Swedish, English
- President: Carl Åkerström
- Vice President: Dennis Fonseca Karlsson
- Website: ufsverige.org

Swedish Association of International Affairs (SAIA) (Swedish: Utrikespolitiska Förbundet Sverige, UFS) is an umbrella organization for the associations of international affairs that can be found in most of the major university cities in Sweden. It has a total of 9 member organizations, which have about 3,000 members in between themselves and organize about 350 events per year. The main focus of its member organizations is the furthering of debate of international issues at the respective universities through lectures with politicians, diplomats, academics, activists, and others.

== History ==
The first member organization of UFS, the Uppsala Student Association for the League of Nations, was founded in 1925. Together with the other three original member associations at University of Gothenburg, Lund University, and Stockholm University, it founded Sweden's Academic Association for the League of Nations, which in turn was part of the International University Federation of the League of Nations (IUFLN). However, in 1935, the Swedish branch left IUFLN and with its renaming into the Swedish Academic Association for Foreign Affairs (SAFU) in 1939, the break-off was completed. With the outbreak of World War II, both the local and the umbrella organizations were dissolved. After the war, they were founded anew, this time under an umbrella organization of the United Nations (UN). However, this organization was vacated in the mid-1980s. In 1997, a new umbrella organization was created by five associations under the name of Sweden's Foreign-Policy Associations and in 2007, it was renamed into the Swedish Association of International Affairs.

== Activities ==
As a mother organization, SAIA supports its member organizations both financially and by encouraging cooperation and the exchange of information between the various organizations. Members of the associations organized in SAIA can also attend lectures at any of the other associations. Each organization has a delegate on SAIA's board. Further, SAIA arranges meetings between the member associations' organizing committees, as well as the Annual Conference on Foreign Affairs (Swedish: Utrikespolitiskt Konvent), which is open to all members of the associations and consists of workshops and lectures. SAIA also maintains a presence at Almedalen every year.

SAIA is a member of both the National Council of Swedish Youth Organisations (LSU) and the Swedish NGO Society and Defence. The association also cooperates closely with the Swedish Institute for International Affairs (UI).

== Member organizations ==
- Gothenburg Society of International Affairs
- Karlstad Association of Foreign Affairs
- Linköping Student Association of Foreign Affairs
- Lund Association of Foreign Affairs
- Malmö Association of Foreign Affairs
- Stockholm Association of International Affairs
- Umeå Association of International Affairs
- Uppsala Association of International Affairs
- Växjö Association of International Affairs

== Chairpersons ==
- 2020/2021 Johan Bergman
- 2019/2020 Sakke Teerikoski
- 2018/2019 Hanna Waerland
- 2017/2018 Oscar Theblin
- 2016/2017 Rosaline Marbinah
- 2015/2016 Axel Nordenstam
- 2014/2015 Anna Welsapar
- 2013/2014 Aria Nakhaei
- 2012/2013 Joakim Bong Henriksson
- 2011/2012 Johan Tinnerholm
- 2010/2011 Frida Vernersdotter
- 2009/2010 Tamuz Hidir
- 2008/2009 Abrak Saati
- 2007/2008 Eric Hale
