= ΜF =

μF may refer to:

- Microfarad, a unit of electrical capacitance equal to 1 × 10^{−6} farads
- Microformat, a set of HTML classes for metadata

The dictionary definition of μF at Wiktionary
