= Uppsala Association of International Affairs =

Swedish-based think tank

Uppsala Association of Foreign Affairs

The Uppsala Association of Foreign Affairs (Swedish: Utrikespolitiska föreningen i Uppsala, UF Uppsala) is a politically and religiously independent association that strives to create debate around international issues. It has a strong connection to Uppsala University in Sweden, with most of its members being students at the university. It is also part of the Swedish Association of International Affairs (SAIA), which serves as an umbrella organization.

The main activity of the association is lectures held by invited guests. They can be politicians, diplomats, journalists or experts on specific fields connected to foreign affairs. Over the years the association has been visited by prominent people such as Gunnar Myrdal, Olof Palme, Günther Wallraff, Boutros Boutros-Ghali, Hans Blix, Fredrik Reinfeldt and Ban Ki-moon. Further, the association organizes study trips to foreign countries, publishes a foreign affairs magazine named Uttryck, and hosts a weekly radio broadcast.

== History ==
The precursor organization of the Uppsala Association of Foreign Affairs, the Uppsala Student Association for the League of Nations, was founded in 1925. Together with the other three original member associations of what should become SAIA, namely the organizations at University of Gothenburg, Lund University, and Stockholm University, it founded Sweden's Academic Association for the League of Nations, which in turn was part of the International University Federation of the League of Nations (IUFLN). However, in 1935, the Swedish branch left IUFLN and with its renaming into the Swedish Academic Association for Foreign Affairs (SAFU) in 1939, the break-off was completed.

With the outbreak of World War II, both the umbrella organization and local associations were dissolved. In 1948, the Uppsala Association of Foreign Affairs was founded as Sweden's first official UN association for students. In 1985, however, it left the UN umbrella organization that it was part of. In 1997, the Uppsala Association of Foreign Affairs joined other associations throughout the country in creating a new umbrella organization named Sweden's Foreign-Policy Associations, which was then renamed into the Swedish Association of International Affairs in 2007.
