= Dlshad Othman =

Information technology specialist

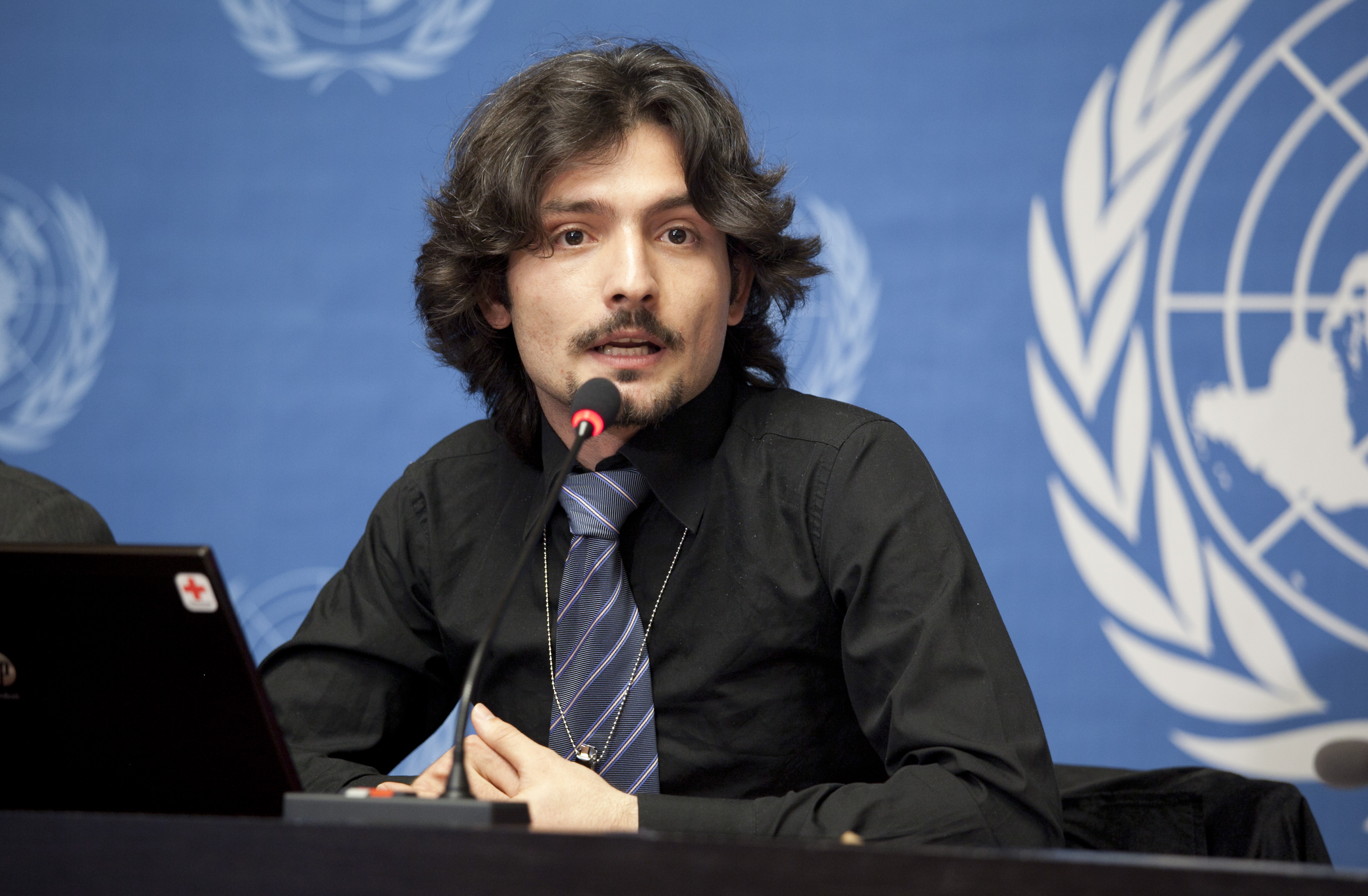
- Othman at the Internet Freedom Fellows Press Conference at the United Nations in 2012
- Born: Syria
- Occupations: Information technology engineer, activist
- Years active: 2011–present
- Employer: Institute for War and Peace Reporting
- Organization: Center for Documentation of Violations in Syria
- Known for: Cybersecurity for Syrian activists; Internet Freedom Fellows (2012)
- Awards: Internet Freedom Fellows (2012)

Dlshad Othman is a Kurdish Syrian activist and information technology engineer who provides Syrians with digital security resources and assistance so that they can utilize online communications and advocacy freely and securely in spite of increased online government repression in the form of censorship, sophisticated cyber attacks, and intense surveillance.

He started supporting local coordination committees in Syria as an IT consultant from the beginning of the Syrian revolution but was obliged to flee Syria at the end of 2011 when his name became known to Syrian intelligence following the arrest of British documentary filmmaker Sean Mcallister. Dlshad designed and is still working on the data protection systems of the Center for Documentation of Violations in Syria, which is used by the media and NGOs worldwide. He started working with the Institute for War and Peace Reporting as a cyber-security trainer in December 2011. He has given many data security training courses for Syrian activists in Lebanon and in Jordan. He has succeeded in detecting malwares developed by the Syrian regime to monitor Syrian activists and has been able to guide international organizations active in helping opponents of the Syrian regime.

In 2012, Dlshad was chosen to be an Internet Freedom Fellow, a program funded by the United States Department of State. He has tried to focus on companies who supported the Syrian government with information technology solutions to monitor the internet.
