= Sigma Iota Rho =

Collegiate honour society for international studies

- ΣΙΡ
- Founded: May 9, 1984; 42 years ago American University
- Type: Honor
- Affiliation: Independent
- Status: Active
- Emphasis: International Relations
- Scope: International
- Motto: Prudence, Ideals, Power
- Member badge
- Colors: Black, Blue, and Red
- Publication: Journal of International Relations
- Chapters: 140
- Headquarters: c/o International Relations Program; 255 South 36th Street; 635 Williams Hall; Philadelphia, Pennsylvania 19104-6305; United States
- Website: www.sigmaiotarho.org

Sigma Iota Rho (ΣΙΡ) is an international collegiate honor society for international studies. It was established in 1984 at American University in Washington, D.C. It has established more than 190 chapters in the United States, the United Kingdom, and France.

== History ==
Sigma Iota Rho, an honor society for international studies, originated in 1983 at American University in Washington, D.C. It was an initiative of scholars and practitioners who sought a national platform to recognize excellence in the field. William C. Olson, then-dean of the School of International Service at American University, was one of its founders and its first president. The first class of twelve members was initiated on May 9, 1984. American University recognized the new organization on August 22, 1984.

During the 1985 International Studies Association meeting in Washington, D.C., a group met to discuss expanding Sigma Iota Rho to other campuses. Sigma Iota Rho was organized as a national society with 26 petitioning institutions at a formal meeting on April 16, 1987. Its purpose is "to promote and reward scholarship and service among students, faculty and practitioners of global relations and international studies". Roger Coate, professor at the University of South Carolina and advisor to the Beta chapter, was elected president.

Sigma Iota Rho was incorporated in the District of Columbia on April 8, 1989. The society's headquarters has been in Philadelphia, Pennsylvania since 2002.

== Symbols ==
Greek letters Sigma Iota Rho were selected for the Greek words Synesis (prudence), Ideodoi (ideals), and Rhomi (power). This also comprises the society's motto: "Prudence, Ideals, Power".

Sigma Iota Rho's symbols are a spider, falcon, and lightning representing prudence, ideals, and power. Its colors are black, blue, and red. Black represents knowledge and discretion, blue represents loyalty, and red represents ferocity and magnanimity. Its honor cord is yellow.

== Activities ==
Sigma Iota Rho hosts an annual Student Research Conference in International Relations. The national society awards scholarships and research grants to members. It also published the undergraduate peer-reviewed Journal of International Relations. At the local level, chapters host speakers, networking events, and fundraising drives for global issues or causes.

== Membership ==
Membership categories include undergraduates, graduate students, faculty, adjuncts, and honorary. Membership is open to juniors and seniors who have completed eighteen hours in international relations, global affairs, and other majors with a GPA of 3.3 or higher. Graduate students must have completed one semester with a 3.3 GPA.

== Chapters ==
Sigma Iota Rho more than 190 chapters in the United States, the United Kingdom, Iraq, and France.

== See also ==
- Association of Professional Schools of International Affairs
- List of international relations institutes and organisations
- Professional fraternities and sororities
