= Marc Lynch =

American political scientist

Marc Lynch is a Professor of Political Science and International Affairs at George Washington University, where he is also director of both the Institute for Middle East Studies and the Middle East Studies Program.

Lynch is also a non-resident senior fellow at the Center for a New American Security, and is on the editorial board of PS Political Science & Politics. Marc Lynch also writes a blog for Foreign Policy. Lynch received his B.A. degree from Duke University and his M.A. and Ph.D. degrees from Cornell University.

He is best known for coining the term Arab Spring in an article for the US political journal Foreign Policy.

== Publications ==
- 1999: State Interest and Public Spheres: the International Politics of Jordan's Identity, a study of Jordanian society and politics (New York: Columbia University Press).
- September/October 2007: "Brothers in Arms: Memo to the Muslim Brotherhood on How to Talk to America". Foreign Policy.
- 2007: Voices of the New Arab Public: Iraq, al-Jazeera, and Middle East Politics Today (Columbia Univ. Pr.).
- July/August 2010: "Veiled Truths: The Rise of Political Islam in the West", Foreign Affairs 89, no.4, pp.138-147.
- 2011: "After Egypt: The Limits and Promise of the Online Challenges to the Authoritarian Arab State". Perspectives on Politics 9, no.2, pp.301-310.
- 2011: Revolution in the Arab World: Tunisia, Egypt, And the Unmaking of an Era (Foreign Policy). eBook.
- March 2012: The Arab Uprising: The Unfinished Revolutions of the New Middle East, a book about the so-called Arab Spring (PublicAffairs).
- 2014: The Tourniquet: A Strategy for Defeating the Islamic State and Saving Syria and Iraq (Center for a New American Security)
- 2014: The Arab Uprisings Explained: New Contentious Politics in the Middle East (Columbia University Press)
- April 2016: The New Arab Wars: Uprisings and Anarchy in the Middle East (PublicAffairs, United States).
- 2023: The One State Reality: What Is Israel/Palestine?, ed. with Michael Barnett, Nathan J. Brown and Shibley Telhami (Cornell University Press)
- 2025: America's Middle East: The Ruination of a Region (Oxford University Press)
