= Local Coordination Committees of Syria =

Local groups that organise and report on protests

Local Coordination Committees of Syria لجان التنسيق المحلية في سوريا
- Abbreviation: LCC
- Formation: March 2011
- Purpose: Opposition to Ba'athist Syria
- Region served: Syria
- Members: 100–200 (June 2011)
- Official language: Arabic
- Key person: Razan Zaitouneh
- Key person: Awad ALOYEED
- Parent organization: Syrian opposition
- Website: lccsyria.org
- Remarks: Promotes civil disobedience, media campaigns

The Local Coordination Committees of Syria (Arabic: لجان التنسيق المحلية في سوريا, romanized: Lijān al-Tansīq al-Maḥallīyah fī Sūriyā; LCCSyria or LCCs) were a network of local groups that organise and report on protests as part of the Syrian uprising. In June 2011, the network was described by The New York Times as beginning to "emerge as a pivotal force" in Syria. As of August 2011, the network supported civil disobedience and opposed local armed resistance and international military intervention as methods of opposing the Syrian government.

== Creation ==
The Local Coordination Committees of Syria started in March 2011 from local groups that published reports about protests during the Syrian uprising and developed into a national network involved in journalism about protests and the protests themselves. The groups had developed from informal networks of friends and colleagues involved in dissidence that had existed for many years. Prior to the uprising, Syrian activists had brought in mobile telephones, satellite modems and computers in anticipation of Arab Spring protests developing in Syria. In June 2011, The New York Times described the network as beginning to "emerge as a pivotal force" in Syrian politics, "earning the respect of more recognized, but long divided dissidents." The formation and structure of the councils were influenced by the proposals of the anarchist Omar Aziz, known for his November 2011 paper, The Formation of Local Councils.

== Structure ==
The LCCSyria network consists of "overwhelmingly young" demonstrators of multiple religious and class backgrounds. The network is decentralized and works in secret. The first of the committees was created in the Daraya suburb of Damascus. As of June 2011, the most active committee was in Homs. As of June 2011, the network had 35 individual leaders, who tried to communicate daily. As of February 2012, the network had 14 local committees, one each in Daraa, Homs, Baniyas, Saraqeb, Idlib, al-Hasakah, Qamishli, Deir ez-Zor, the Syrian coast, Hama, Raqqa, as-Suwayda', Damascus and the Damascus suburbs.

== Finances ==
LCCSyria was financed by donations from individual supporters. This was further facilitated by the "Adopt a Revolution" initiative. Furthermore, the Office for Syrian Opposition Support, which itself was founded by the United States Department of State and Foreign and Commonwealth Office and is funded by the Friends of Syria Group, provides "material support" and "training assistance" to the LCCs.

== Human rights journalism ==
Rami Nakhle, who helps LCCSyria from exile in Lebanon, said that media activities documenting protests were the network's first main activity. The Syrian human rights lawyer Razan Zaitouneh, winner of the 2011 Sakharov Prize and the 2011 Anna Politkovskaya Award, has documented human rights in Syria for the network. The network's text and photographic reports of injuries and deaths of protestors have been used by CNN, Al Jazeera English, The Guardian and The Washington Post. The network publishes reports on its own website and on Facebook.

On 1 February 2012, LCCSyria criticised the international and Arab community as having been "unable to take any decision that contributes to stopping the cycle of violence in Syria". It estimated the number of deaths in the civil war is more than 100,000.

== Protest methods ==
Amnesty International describes the network's methods as peaceful protests. Civil disobedience methods used by the network include nightly protests in Hama and refusal to pay water, electricity and telephone bills in the Duma suburb of Damascus. The network called for a two-day general strike on 5–6 February 2012. They also called with other non-violence groups to the Dignity Strike in Syria "Karamah Strike".

=== Non-violence ===
In August 2011, LCCSyria declared that it understands the calls for internal armed opposition to the Syrian government and international military intervention, but opposes both. It said that militarisation would reduce popular support for the opposition, reduce the opposition's moral superiority, and put "the Revolution in an arena where the regime has a distinct advantage". The network said that peaceful demonstrations would make it easier to develop democracy following a revolution, while militarisation would make it "virtually impossible to establish a legitimate foundation for a proud future Syria." LCC Syria was one of the groups that formed what's called "Freedom Days" as an umbrella for non-violence groups in Syria.

== See also ==
- Democratic confederalism
- Syrian Revolution Network
- Syrian Revolution Coordinators Union
- Supreme Council of the Syrian Revolution
- Sudanese resistance committees
