= Yassin al-Haj Saleh =

Syrian writer and political dissident (born 1961)

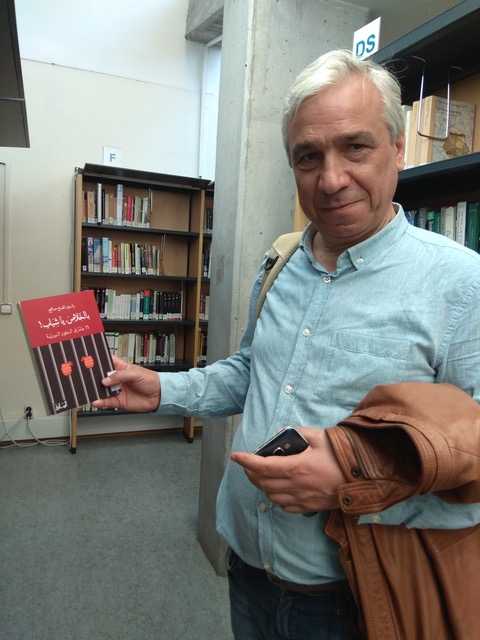
- Yassin al-Haj Saleh
- Born: 1961 (age 64–65); Raqqa, Syria
- Education: University of Aleppo
- Occupations: writer, political dissident
- Spouse: Samira Khalil
- Website: www.yassinhs.com

Yassin al-Haj Saleh (Arabic: ياسين الحاج صالح; born 1961) is a Syrian writer and leftist political dissident. He writes on political, social and cultural subjects relating to Syria and the Arab world.

== Life and career ==
From 1980 to 1996, he spent time in prison in Syria for his membership in the left-wing opposition group Syrian Communist Party (Political Bureau), which he calls a "communist pro-democracy group". However, he has also stated that his time in prison allowed him to break out of the "internal prisons [of] narrow political affiliation [and] rigid ideology" and has called the Syrian revolution an "open-ended and multi-leveled struggle", while remaining supportive of aspects of Marxism. He was arrested while he was studying medicine in Aleppo and spent sixteen years in prison, the last in Tadmur Prison. He took his final examination as a general medical practitioner in 2000, but never practiced.

In addition to being known for his own published books and articles, he also helped launch the bilingual publication AlJumhuriya.net (est. 2012), lauded by journalist Kim Ghattas as "an online Arabic news platform that is one of the best sources of information and analysis in the region."

He was one of the speakers in a two-day anti-capitalist forum, which was held in Ankara, Turkey, on November 23-24, 2013. Additionally, he was speaking at the event 'Reporting Change - Stories from the Arab region' in Amsterdam on 15 June 2014, an event jointly organized by Human Rights Watch and World Press Photo.

Al-Haj Saleh is married to Samira Khalil, a communist dissident, former political detainee and revolutionary activist who was abducted in Douma in December 2013. After 21 months of hiding in Damascus and the rest of Syria for being wanted by both the government and radical Islamist militants, he fled to Turkey and lived in Istanbul until 2017. Al-Haj Saleh is now a fellow at Berlin Institute for Advanced Study (Wissenschaftskolleg zu Berlin).

== Accolades ==
He has been granted a Prince Claus Award for 2012 as "actually a tribute to the Syrian people and the Syrian revolution. He was unable to collect the award as he was then hiding among the Syrian underground. He was awarded the Swedish Tucholsky Prize in 2017.

== Works ==
One of the most influential Arab writers and dissidents as well as a prominent intellectual voice of the Syrian revolution, Yassin Al-Haj Saleh writes on political, social and cultural subjects relating to Syria and the rest of the Arab world for several Arab newspapers and journals outside of Syria, and regularly contributes to the London-based Al-Hayat, the Egyptian leftist magazine Al-Bosla and the Syrian online periodical The Republic.

Among his books (the majority in Arabic):

- Syria in the Shadow: Glimpses Inside the Black Box (2009, Dar Jidar);
- Walking on One Foot (2011, Dar al-Adab, Beirut), a collection of 52 essays about Syrian affairs, written between 2006 and 2010;
- Salvation O Boys: 16 Years in Syrian Prisons (2012, Dar al-Saqi, Beirut);
- The Myths of the Latters: A Critique of Contemporary Islam and a Critique of its Critique (2012, Dar al-Saqi, Beirut);
- Deliverance or Destruction? Syria at a Crossroads (2014, Cairo Institute for Human Rights Studies);
- The Impossible Revolution: Making Sense of the Syrian Tragedy (2017, Hurst Publishers, London) [In English].
