= Razan Zaitouneh =

Syrian human rights lawyer and activist

- رزان زيتونة
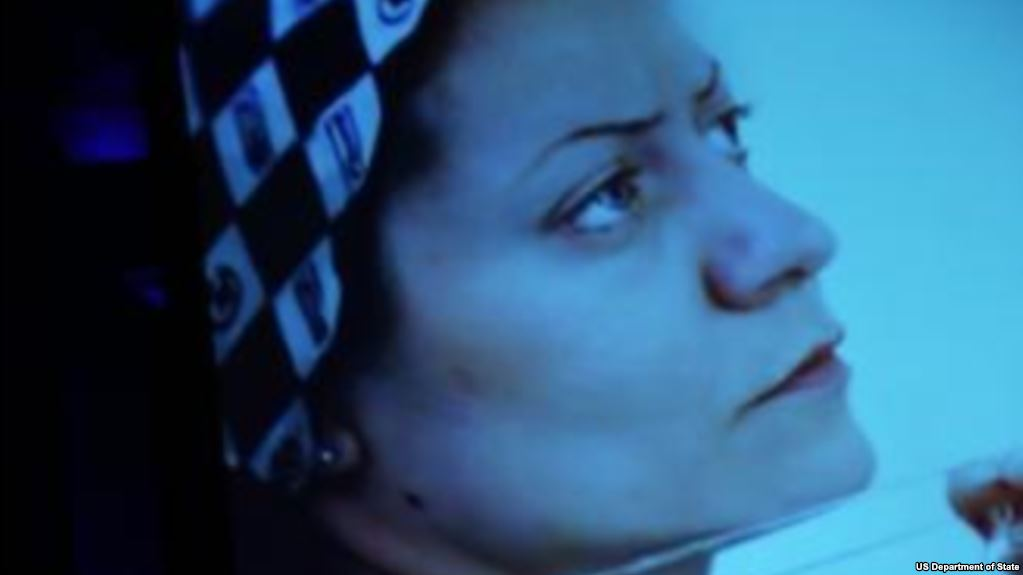
- Undated picture of Razan Zaitouneh
- Born: 29 April 1977; Syria
- Disappeared: 9 December 2013 (aged 36); Douma, Syria
- Status: Missing for 12 years, 10 months and 14 days
- Education: Law degree
- Occupation: Human rights lawyer
- Organization(s): Local Coordination Committees of Syria, Violations Documentation Center in Syria
- Known for: human rights activism during the civil uprising and early insurgency phases of the Syrian Civil War

Razan Zaitouneh (sometimes spelled Zeitunah; Arabic: رزان زيتونة; born 29 April 1977) is a Syrian human rights lawyer and civil society activist. Actively involved in the Syrian uprising, she went into hiding after being accused by the government of being a foreign agent and her husband was arrested. Zaitouneh has documented human rights in Syria for the Local Coordination Committees of Syria. Zaitouneh was kidnapped on 9 December 2013, most likely by Jaysh al-Islam. Her fate remains unknown, though after being missing for over a decade without any conclusive signs of life it is strongly suspected that she has been killed following her abduction.

== Education ==
Zaitouneh graduated from law school at Damascus University in Damascus in 1999.

== Legal and human rights activism ==
She has been a member of the team of lawyers for defense of political prisoners since 2001. In the same year, Razan was one of the founders of the Human Rights Association in Syria (HRAS). In 2005, Razan Zaitouneh established SHRIL (the Syrian Human Rights Information Link), through which she continues to report about human rights violations in Syria. From 2005 through to her 2013 disappearance, Razan Zaitouneh was an active member of the Committee to Support Families of Political Prisoners in Syria.

Syrian State television aired announcement that Razan Zaitouneh was a foreign agent on 23 March 2011, after which she went into hiding while continuing her legal and human rights work, in order to avoid being arrested.

Zaitouneh founded the Violations Documentation Center in Syria in April 2011 to document human rights violations and abuses in the country by all sides. She also contributed to human rights violations reports circulated by the Local Coordination Committees of Syria, of which she was one of the founders.

Her husband, Wael Hamadeh (or Wael Hamada, or Wa'el Hammada) was arrested on 12 May 2011. His brother 'Abd al-Rahman Hammada was also arrested. Wael was released on bail on 1 August 2011.

On 27 October 2011, Zaitouneh was awarded the 2011 Sakharov Prize for Freedom of thought, jointly with four other Arabs. She was previously awarded the Anna Politkovskaya Award by Reach All Women in War. In 2013, Zaitouneh was granted the International Women of Courage Award.

She had received death threats for her work, and because she didn’t wear a headscarf or align with conservative traditions.

== 2013 disappearance ==
Pro-opposition websites reported that on 9 December 2013 Zaitouneh had been kidnapped along with her husband, Wael Hamadeh, and two colleagues, Samira Khalil and Nazem Hammadi, in the opposition-held town of Douma to the north of Damascus. Their whereabouts were still unknown and the identity of the kidnappers uncertain, although it was suspected that the Islamist Salafi rebel group Jaysh al-Islam was responsible. They were believed to have previously sent Zaitouneh a letter threatening to kill her.

As of August 2018, the Associated Press (AP) was unaware of significant evidence for Zaitouneh's fate. AP stated clues suggesting that Jaysh al-Islam had detained Zaitouneh and held her in Tawbeh Prison. Jaysh al-Islam denied the claim. One clue was a graffito seen by several witnesses on a prison cell wall stating, "I miss my mother – Razan Zaitouneh, 2016." Another clue was the use of one of the Violations Documentation Center computers, taken together with Zaitouneh in the December 2013 kidnapping, from a Jaysh al-Islam IP address at Tawbeh Prison. Another opposition activist, Mazen Darwish, stated that Zaitouneh was held by Jaysh al-Islam until early 2017. AP judged it likely that Zaitouneh had been killed.

On 17 February 2020, one of the Syrian intelligence agencies declared that it had discovered a mass grave in al-Ub around the eastern Ghouta district, containing around 70 bodies. Russian sources speculated that of them appeared to be that of Razan Zaitouneh.

In 2020, French authorities arrested Majdi Mustapha Nameh (Islam Alloush) in relation to Zaitouneh's disappearance.

In March 2021, a criminal complaint was filed in France by the International Federation for Human Rights (FIDH) and the Syrian Center for Media and Freedom of Expression, holding Jaysh al-Islam responsible for her abduction.

In July 2022, a clue reported by Deutsche Welle was that two months after the abduction, a member of Jaysh al-Islam had used Zaitouneh's computer to log on to her social media accounts. The computer had been given to Zaitouneh through a project funded by the United States Department of State, enabling geolocation and identification of the user. The Deutsche Welle investigation suggested that the abduction had been masterminded by two local Jaysh al-Islam leaders, Abu Qusai al-Dirani and Samir Kaakeh. When the leader of Jaysh al-Islam at the time, Zahran Alloush, learnt about the abduction, he tried to negotiate an agreement to free her and three other abductees. However, Zahran Alloush was killed in a Russian airstrike. His successor and cousin, Mohammed Alloush, refused to continue the proposals for a deal.

Zaitouneh and the three people she was abducted with, her husband Wael Hammada, Nazem Hammadi, and Samira al-Khalil are still missing as of June 2026.

== See also ==
- Mazen Darwish
- Samira Khalil
- Human rights in Syria
- List of kidnappings
- List of people who disappeared mysteriously: post-1970

== Awards ==
- Sakharov Prize for Freedom of Thought 2011
- The 2011 Anna Politkovskaya Award
- The Ibn Rushd Prize for Freedom of Thought for the year 2012 in Berlin
