= Samira Khalil =

Syrian activist

Samira Khalil (Arabic: سميرة الخليل) is a Syrian dissident, former political detainee and a revolutionary activist from the Homs region of Syria. Khalil is currently missing after being abducted in Douma on December 9, 2013, along with fellow activists Razan Zaitouneh, Wael Hamada, and Nazem Hammadi. She was previously arrested and detained for four years from 1987–1991 for her opposition to the Al-Assad government in Syria.

== Activism and missing person status ==
After her imprisonment in the eighties, Khalil operated a publishing house before shifting her efforts to working with the families of detainees and writing about detention in Syria. Before her abduction in 2013, she was working to help women in Douma support themselves by initiating small income generating projects, and had stayed in Douma to establish two women's centres.

Khalil and her husband Yassin al-Haj Saleh were the subject of the documentary Baladna Alraheeb (English: Our Terrible Country), which documented the period in their lives prior to Khalil going missing.

It seems possible if not probable that Jaysh al-Islam is responsible for Khalil's disappearance given their control of the area in which she and the other activists went missing.

Khalil was awarded the Petra Kelly Prize by the Heinrich Böll Foundation in 2014 for her work at the Center for Documentation of Violations in Syria.

== See also ==
- Razan Zaitouneh
- Yassin al-Haj Saleh
