= Fida al-Sayed =

Syrian-Swedish imam

Fidaaldin Al-Sayed Issa (Arabic: فداء الدين السيد عيسى), born January 15, 1985, is a Syrian political activist who lives in Eskilstuna, Sweden.

Fida is the chairman of the Youth Coalition of March 15 and former spokesperson for the Facebook page "The Syrian Revolution". Fida is together with his father and siblings, one of the founders of the Office of the Damascus Declaration in Sweden back in 2008. He has been called an infidel on Syrian TV many times. It has also been alleged that his Syrian citizenship has been withdrawn.

According to Syrian press, Fida leads Sweden’s chapter of the Muslim Brotherhood. (not confirmed). While Fida has not directly dismissed these rumors, he has at least once explicitly stated during a television interview that he does not belong to the Muslim Brotherhood. He even refers to the brotherhood in a conversation with Barada TV in February. Several photos have also circulated on the Internet different pictures of Fida with senior members of the Muslim Brotherhood in Egypt.

Fida is a Swedish citizen and known as the imam of the Eskilstuna Mosque. Fida is currently studying Sharia combined with studies for a PhD in Innovation and Product Design at Mälardalen University and is active in the NGO Sweden’s Young Muslims.

== Background ==
Fida was born in an unspecified Arab country. He is the eldest child and has two brothers and a sister. His father Tarif was imprisoned by al-Assad's security forces in Syria. Fida said in an interview that about 16 children at ages 12–13, who wrote "Go away al-Assad" on a toilet wall in his school in Syria and then was arrested by security police. "When they returned, they were raped and had no fingernails left, they had been torn away." The family moved to Sweden in 2001. Fida went to High School at Rudbecksskolan in Stockholm together with his sister Lina. After the 2010 Stockholm bombings, he appeared in various local media in which he renounced terrorism and said that what happened in Stockholm was an evil act and evil acts can never be justified.

== Syrian Revolution Network ==
Fida has together with his two younger brothers Mustafa and Yasir created the page "The Syrian Revolution" on Facebook that has been identified as the most influential social networking tool in the mobilization of protesters during the Syrian Revolution.

In an interview on Nyhetsmorgon at TV4, Fida explained that when he started the page before the "revolution," were initially skeptical of the idea of an uprising in Syria, while others supported the initiative. Fida has stresses several times that the Syrian opposition is a peaceful movement for freedom and democracy. According to Fida no marketing is required for the page, as the situation in Syria was marketing itself. He said he no longer administrates the page alone, and he now has the help of hundreds of young people and pro-democracy activists in Syria.

BBC Arabic showed in a special report how Fida run the page from his apartment in Eskilstuna. Fida explained that 75% of the administrators who run the site today are from within Syria. Fida also told that it is a difficult process before a video is approved and posted on the site: the event must have been filmed and sent by various independent sources, even sometimes needed to be confirmed by filming the date on a local newspaper, or that some of the protesters show big signs where you can clearly see the week's campaign name.

He called Sweden in interview with SVT to expel the Syrian ambassador, explaining that some of his friends had been murdered because of an image or a video that they have sent to the page. 65% of the website's readers are coming from Syria.

== Personal Views ==
Fida has been characterized as a supporter of the Syrian opposition, likening the situation to that of the French Revolution. On the question of military intervention in Syria, he replied "the people of Syria do not want military action. They want political and economic penalties on al-Assad's government, as well as tougher statement from the UN, EU and the larger organizations. They want the EU countries to expel Syrian ambassadors and recall their ambassadors from Damascus".

Fida has reported being sent threatening letters in Swedish and Arabic. In response to the question of how long he intended to continue, Fida answered "until I die".

== See also ==
- Syrian Revolution
- Syrian Revolution General Commission
- Arab Spring
