= San Donnino a Villamagna =

Church building in Villamagna, Italy

San Donnino is a Romanesque-style, Roman Catholic pieve church located in the frazione of Villamagna, in the territory of the commune of Bagno a Ripoli in the metropolitan city of Florence, region of Tuscany, Italy. The church was founded in the 8th century and rebuilt prior to the 14th century.

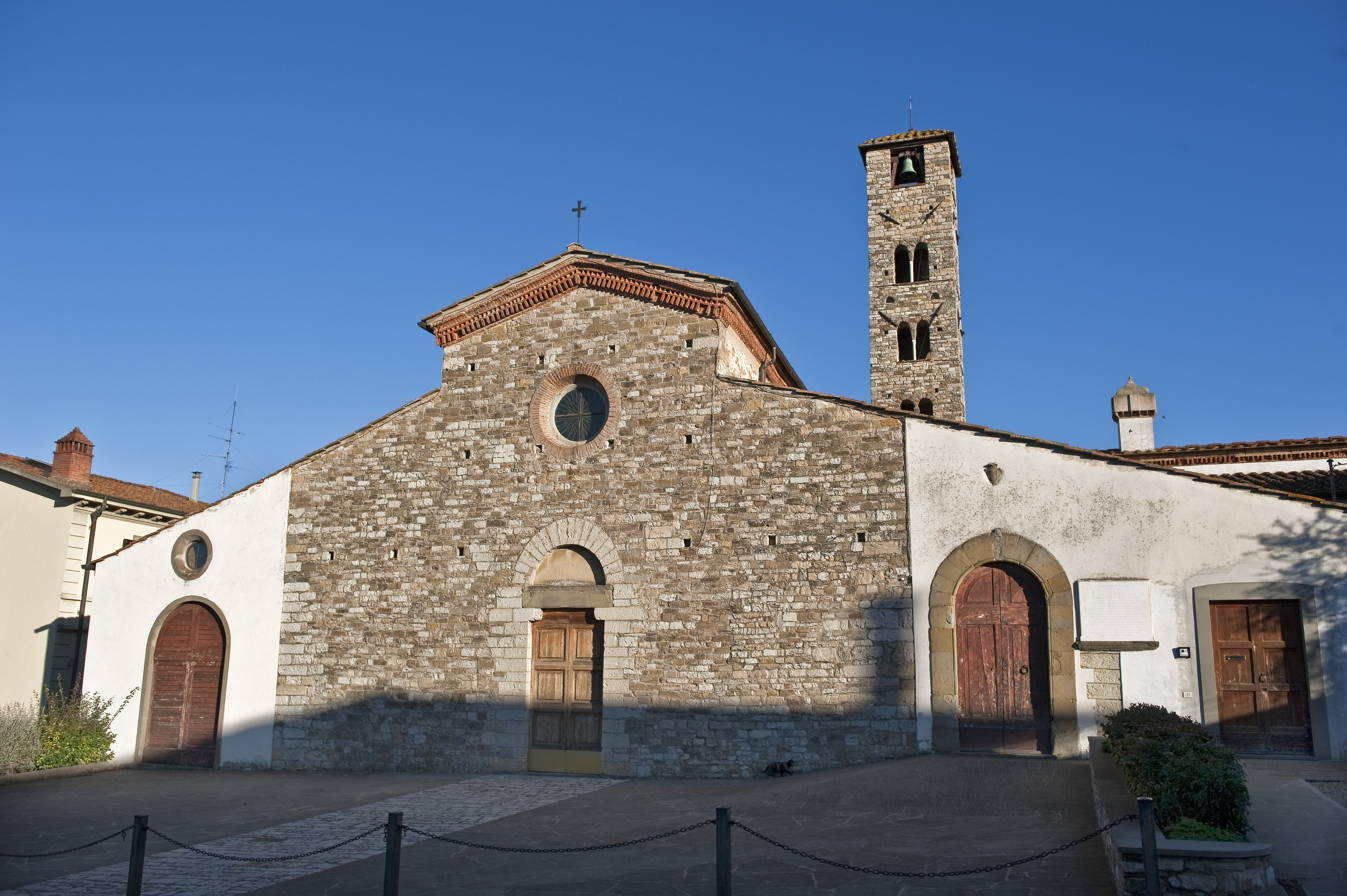
Facade and Bell-tower.

== History ==
Over the centuries various refurbishments were performed but in 1930, it was restored to its Romanesque origins under the guidance of Attilio Rampoldi. The tall Romanesque bell-tower has mullioned windows.

The interiors still house a triptych (1394) by Mariotto di Nardo. Additionally, the church contains a 14th-century altarpiece depicting Enthroned Madonna and Child with Two Saints. It also has a canvas depicting St Dominic and St Catharine in Adoration with a bas-relief depicting the Madonna and Child by Lazzaro Cavalcanti. The Frescoes on the right of the nave are attributed to the Maestro di Signa. Below the main altar are the relics of the blessed Gherardo da Villamagna. On the left nave is a canvas depicting the Madonna and Child and San Donnino by Francesco Granacci. The church has an altarpiece depicting the Enthroned Madonna and Child with Saints John the Baptist, Nicola, Donnino and Sebastian, by David Ghirlandaio. This altar has frescoes depicting the Nativity, the Pietà and God the Father with Evangelists by Maestro Signa. Above the Baptismal font is a St John the Baptist, St Anthony Abbot and St Francis of Assisi attributed to Jacopo di Cione. It was also the original home of Rosso Fiorentino's 1522 Villamagna Altarpiece.
