= Bruno Catarzi =

Italian sculptor

Bruno Catarzi (5 January 1903 in Signa – 21 January 1996 in Florence) was an Italian sculptor and engraver.

== Biography ==
He began his studies at the Academy of Fine Arts of Florence under Domenico Trentacoste. He was a prolific designer of medals. In the 1930s, he taught at the Scuola d’Arte of Pistoia (among his pupils were Agenore Fabbri and Jorio Vivarelli), and from 1963 to 1973, he taught at the Istituto d’Arte of Arezzo.

== Sources ==
- Francesco Sapori, Medaglie e Medaglisti, Home Faber, Anno XIII, N. 123–124, Rome, 1962
- Francesco Giannone, La medaglia italiana alla Zecca di Parigi, Home Faber, Anno XVI, N. 161, Rome, 1966
- Giuliana Signorini, Firenze e il paiolo nella storia dell’arte, Giorgi & Cambi, Firenze, 1992
- Gigi Salvagnini, Cimitero delle Porte Sante, Opus Libri, Firenze, 2001
- Ilaria Taddei, A decorare architetture, Giunti Editore, Firenze, 2003
- Marco Moretti, Bruno Catarzi Scultore 1903–1996, Masso delle Fate Edizioni, Signa, 2005, ISBN 88-6039-006-0
- Giampiero Fossi, Oltre il novecento – Arte contemporanea nelle Signe, Masso delle Fate Edizioni, Signa, 2003, ISBN 88-87305-42-0
