= Alimondo Ciampi =

Italian sculptor

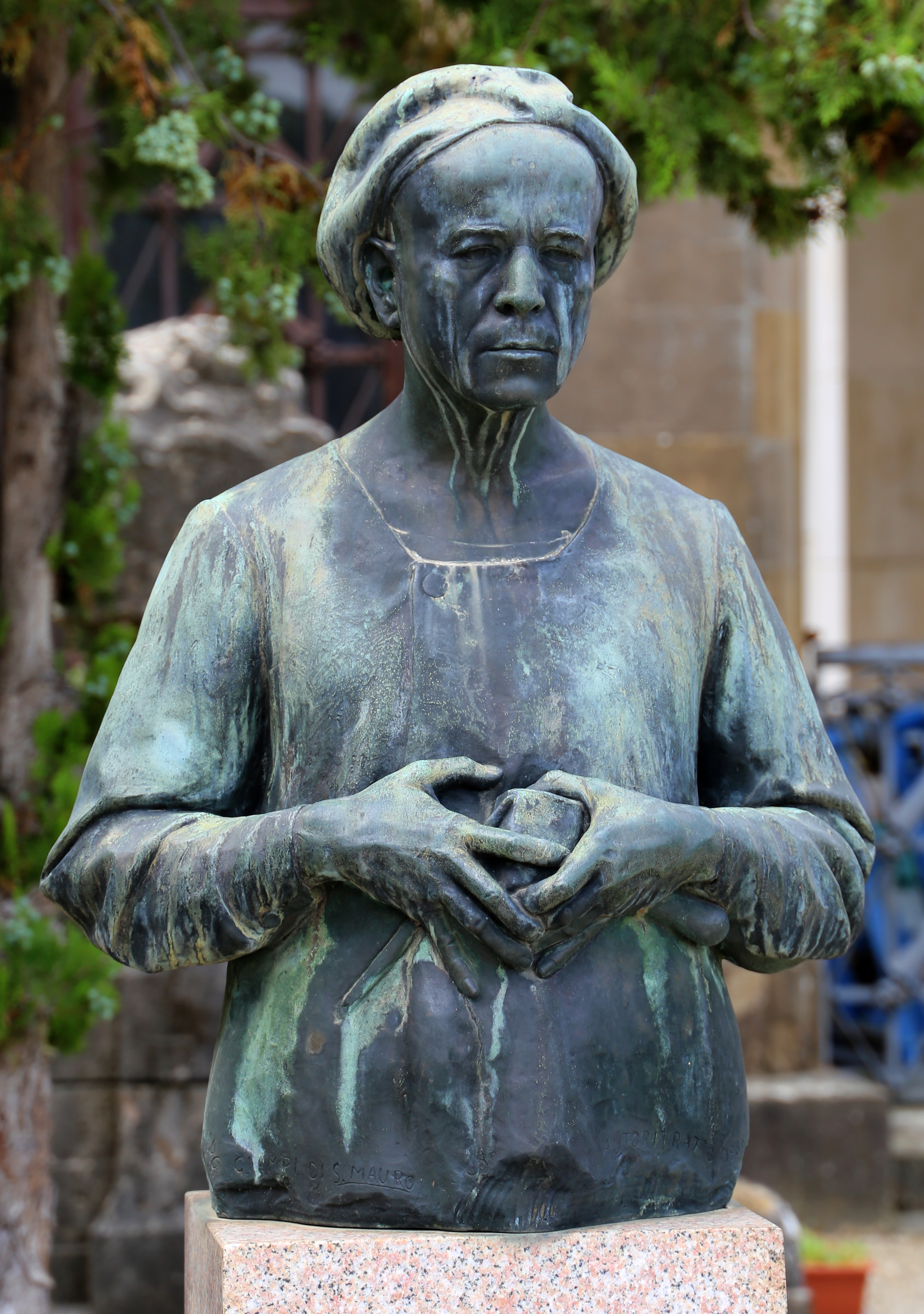
Alimondo Ciampi, funerary monument for himself and his family, 1939–40; Self-Portrait, 1938.

Arimondo Silvio, called Alimondo Ciampi (18 December 1876 in San Mauro a Signa – 8 December 1939 in Florence) was an Italian sculptor.

== Biography ==
Employed in Florence as an apprentice in a marble and alabaster workshop, Ciampi quickly learned the craft and later refined his artistic training in the studio of the sculptor Antonio Bortone.

Although he began as an alabaster craftsman, Ciampi's artistic development was strongly influenced by Domenico Trentacoste, then a professor at the Academy of Fine Arts in Florence. Under his guidance, Ciampi reached the milestone of exhibiting at the Venice Biennale, where he first showed his work in 1909.

He began establishing himself nationally in his mid-twenties. His works were exhibited in five editions of the Venice Biennale between 1909 and 1924, as well as in numerous other exhibitions throughout Italy.

In Scandicci, he sculpted the War Memorial in Piazza Umberto I (now Piazza Matteotti), erected in 1926.

In 1998, a retrospective exhibition of around fifty works was held in the former Church of San Lorenzo in Signa. The exhibition included sculptures in plaster, terracotta, bronze and marble from the Gallery of Modern Art of Florence and Montecatini, as well as private collections, and offered a comprehensive overview of the artist's four decades of work, from the beginning of the twentieth century until 1939, the year of his death.

More recently, the municipal administration of Signa established a permanent exhibition of eight bronze sculptures in the public gardens of Piazza della Repubblica, made possible through the support of Ciampi's son, Giotto Ciampi, who financed the project. Explaining his decision, Giotto Ciampi stated that, to honor his father's artistic legacy, neither a temporary exhibition nor a book would have been sufficient; a "living museum," with sculptures placed in natural outdoor spaces dedicated to children, would not only preserve and promote his father's work but also help foster an appreciation of beauty and art in younger generations.

He is buried at the Cimitero delle Porte Sante in Florence.

== See also ==
- Alimondo Ciampi Foundation, fondazionealimondociampi.org
- Catalogo Generale dei Beni Culturali , by Ministry of Culture (Italy)
