= Alvaro Cartei =

Italian painter (1911–1995)

Alvaro Cartei (28 September 1911 in Signa – 8 October 1995 in Signa) was an Italian painter and ceramist.
