= Lorenzo Orsetti =

Italian anarchist international volunteer of the YPG

- Lorenzo Orsetti, a YPG, TKP-ML, and TA volunteer who died in the battle of Baghouz.
- Born: 13 February 1986; Florence, Italy
- Died: 18 March 2019 (aged 33); Al-Baghuz Fawqani, Syria
- Cause of death: Gunshot wounds
- Burial place: Porte Sante cemetery
- Other names: Orso Dellatullo, Tekoşer Piling
- Military career
- Allegiance: SDF
- Branch: YPG
- Service years: 2017–2019
- Nickname: Orso
- Units: TKP/ML TIKKO; Tekoşîna Anarşîst
- Known for: Internationalist volunteer fighter, killed in the Battle of Baghuz Fawqani
- Conflicts: Syrian Civil War; Battle of Afrin; Battle of Baghuz Fawqani (DOW)
- Memorials: Library in Berceto; Parco Nomentano Lorenzo Orsetti; Casa del Popolo Lorenzo Orsetti

Lorenzo Orsetti (13 February 1986 – 18 March 2019), also known as Orso (Bear in Italian) and Tekoşer Piling, was an Italian anarcho-communist and antifascist from Florence who fought with the Syrian Democratic Forces in the Rojava conflict.

== Biography ==
Orsetti was a chef and sommelier by trade and worked in different restaurants in Florence. He became interested in the Rojava conflict, the struggle of the Kurdish people against the Islamic State, and the Rojava Revolution. He met Paolo Andolina, an Italian activist and anarchist who had fought against the Islamic State with YPG International whilst still in Italy.

=== Syria ===
In September 2017 Orsetti travelled to Syria, where he joined the People's Protection Units (YPG). Once in Syria, he struck up friendships with several Italian antifascist volunteers who were fighting there alongside the Kurds.

Upon finishing his military training, Orsetti joined a military formation organised by the Communist Party of Turkey/Marxist–Leninist and then fought during the Battle of Afrin against the Turkish Army and Turkish-backed Free Syrian Army's jihadists with other internationalists as part of TİKKO and AFFA (Anti-Fascist Forces in Afrin). During this time he deployed several times to the front in Deir ez-Zur. He fought initially outside of Hajin with a mixed unit during which IS attempted to break out of the besieged city. The battle lasted for 3 days and resulted in significant casualties. Following this he continued to participate in the campaign until the final defeat of IS in Al-Baghuz. It was during this battle that Lorenzo Orsetti was killed.

== Death ==
Orsetti was killed in action on the morning of Monday 18 March 2019 in the village of Baghouz, Syria. He was in that locality fighting in the Battle of Baghuz Fawqani against the last bastion of the Islamic State in Syria. He was attached to an Arab unit Syrian Democratic Forces when he and his comrades were killed by the jihadists in an ambush. His death was announced by Islamic State media and confirmed by the YPG, Tekoşina Anarşist and by TKP/ML TİKKO, the latter of whom published Orsetti's letter to be read in the event of his death. The letter states: "I don’t have regrets, I died doing what I thought was the right thing, defending the weakest, and being loyal to my ideals of justice, equality, and freedom. So, despite of my premature departure, my life is still successful, and I am almost sure that I went with a smile on my lips. I could not have asked for better."

When announcing his death, his comrades shared Orsetti's last will and testament in which he explained why he had decided to travel to Syria and his ideological motives.

Orsetti's body was recovered as part of a military action by the YPG, before being returned to Florence in June 2019, and was interred in the Porte Sante cemetery, despite his wish to be buried in Syria.

== Honours ==
A library in the train station of Berceto, near Parma, has been named in his honour.

In June 2019 the third district council of Rome renamed Parco Nomentano, a public park, in his honor as Parco Nomentano Lorenzo Orsetti.

In September 2019, the municipality of Florence approved plans to name a street in his honour. The motion was proposed by left-wing municipal councillors and opposed by the right-wing Lega Nord with the abstention of nationalist party Brothers of Italy, who disagreed with calling him a partisan and with the depiction of him as a hero.

In November 2019, a bar and social space in Prato, Tuscany, joined the Arci network and renamed the bar in dedication of Orsetti, becoming the Casa del Popolo Lorenzo Orsetti. The inauguration was held on Saturday 9 November 2019 in the presence of Orsetti's family and friends.

== See also ==
- Foreign fighters in the Syrian and Iraqi Civil Wars
- Anna Campbell
- Haukur Hilmarsson
