= Raffaello Fossi =

Italian painter

Raffaello Fossi, styled RAFO (21 April 1928 in Signa – 8 January 1962 in Signa) was an Italian painter.
