= Mariotto di Nardo =

Italian painter

Mariotto di Nardo di Cione
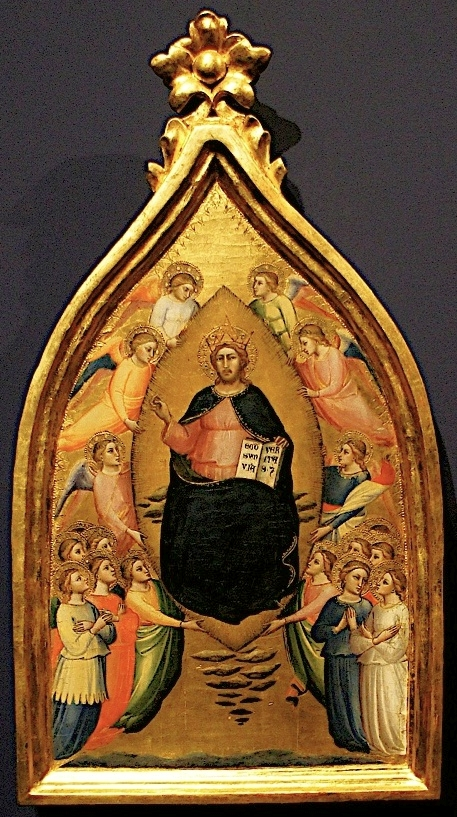
- Christ in Majesty (c. 1395), Czartoryski Museum, Kraków
- Born: before 1365; Florence, Italy
- Died: between 1424 and 1427

Mariotto di Nardo di Cione (fl. 1388–1424) was a Florentine painter in the Florentine Gothic style. He worked at the Duomo of Florence, the church of Santa Maria Maggiore, and the Orsanmichele. He created both frescoes and panel paintings, and was also active as a manuscript illuminator.

== Personal life ==
Mariotto flourished from 1394 to 1424. He was the grandson of Andrea di Cione di Arcangelo and the son of, and apprentice to, Nardo di Cione. Nardo had worked in Siena in 1380 and Volterra in 1381 as a stonecutter. With the lack of personal information on Mariotto, there is essentially no information on Mariotto's direct family, or if he had one at all.

== Influences ==
Mariotto's style belongs to the Florentine Gothic and shows the influence of Spinello Aretino and Niccolo di Pietro Gerini. His later style was influenced slightly by Lorenzo Monaco.

== Career ==
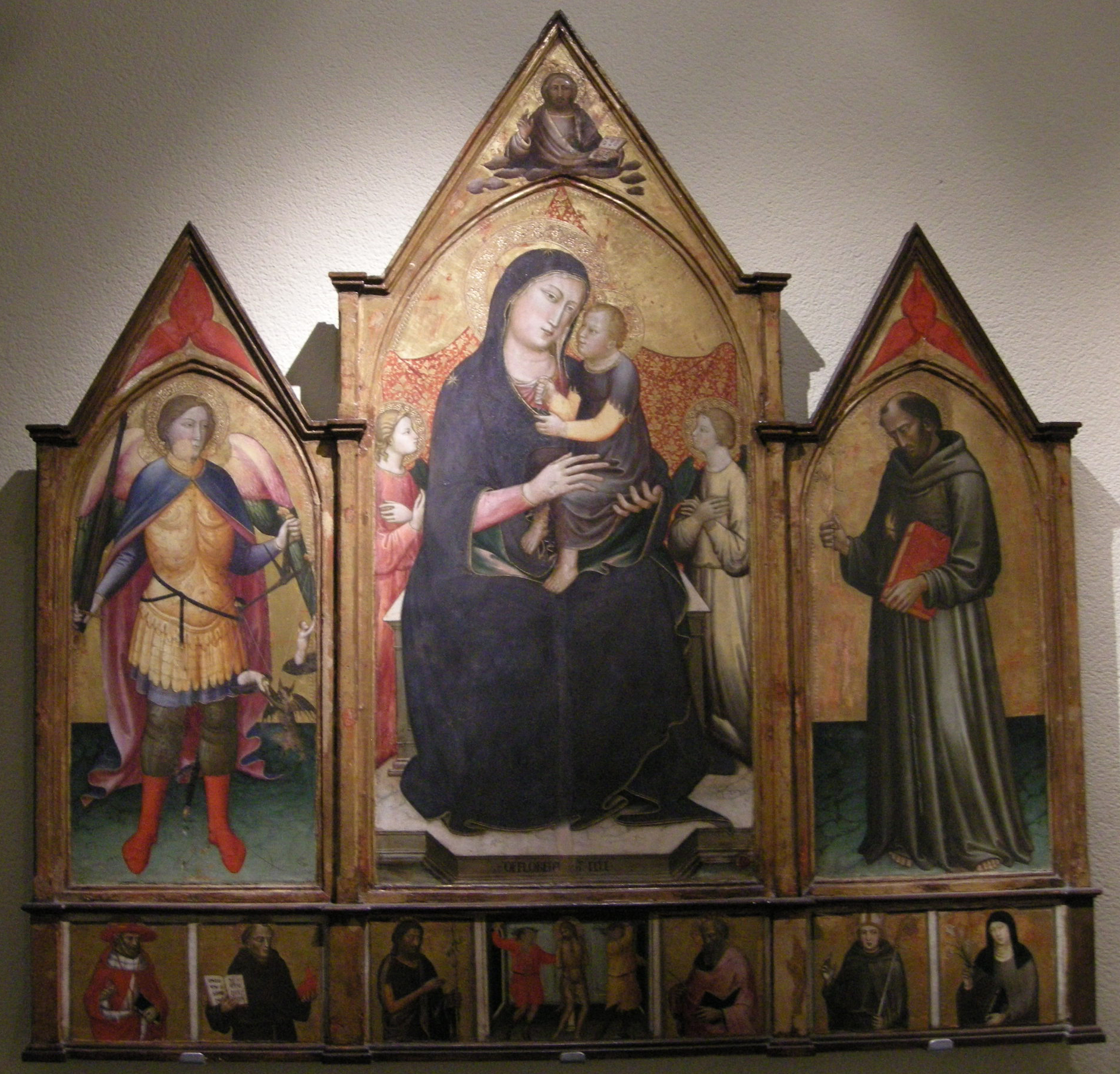
Madonna tra i santi michele e francesco

Mariotto was a member of the Physicians and Apothecaries Guild sometime between 1386 and 1408, and was also a member of the Company of Saint Luke in 1408. Many extant documents show that he was a popular and much sought-after painter in both public and private affairs in Florence. Mariotto is thought to have been principally responsible for the artwork in the cathedral, although most of these paintings have since been tarnished. Mariotto was an avid altarpiece painter, and in 1398, he painted an altarpiece for the chapel of the Madonna della Neve in Florence, commissioned by the Board of Works. He began working on this piece in 1397 and was compensated with 15 florins in partial payment for the creation of the panel for the "opera" of Saint Reparata for the altar of the new chapel of the Virgin Mary. He also painted an altar piece for the Florence Cathedral around 1402–4. Mariotto's uncle, Jacopo di Cione, acted as a guarantor on behalf of Mariotto for the cathedral workshop on 2 May 1398.

In 1400 he worked with Lorenzo Ghiberti in Pesaro. His triptych of the Virgin and Child with Saint Michael and Francis is in the Civic Museum there.

Mariotto was commissioned to create frescos for two of the most important Catholic churches in Florence: the Santa Maria Maggiore and the Orsanmichele (around 1400). Mariotto also executed frescoes for the officials of the Orsanmichele to be placed in their residence. At this stage of his career, he was also commissioned to create illuminated manuscripts for Santa Maria degli Angeli, Florence. This gave him access to the manuscript workshop that would later influence his style; examples of this include two fragments of St Lawrence (Cambridge, Fitzwilliam) and St Mary Magdalene. The last known commission given to Mariotto was a painting for the altar of the Captains of the Company of Sta. Oratory, on 2 March 1415/16.

As Mariotto's career progressed, his paintings became more and more repetitive, showing a personal trademark of distinguishable traits. Although his works were often considered to have been slightly above artisan quality, his success in his time period has baffled later critics. His production introduced to Florence new Gothic techniques such as oblique perspective, nervous tension of the figures and deserted, rocky landscapes.

== Stylistic elements ==
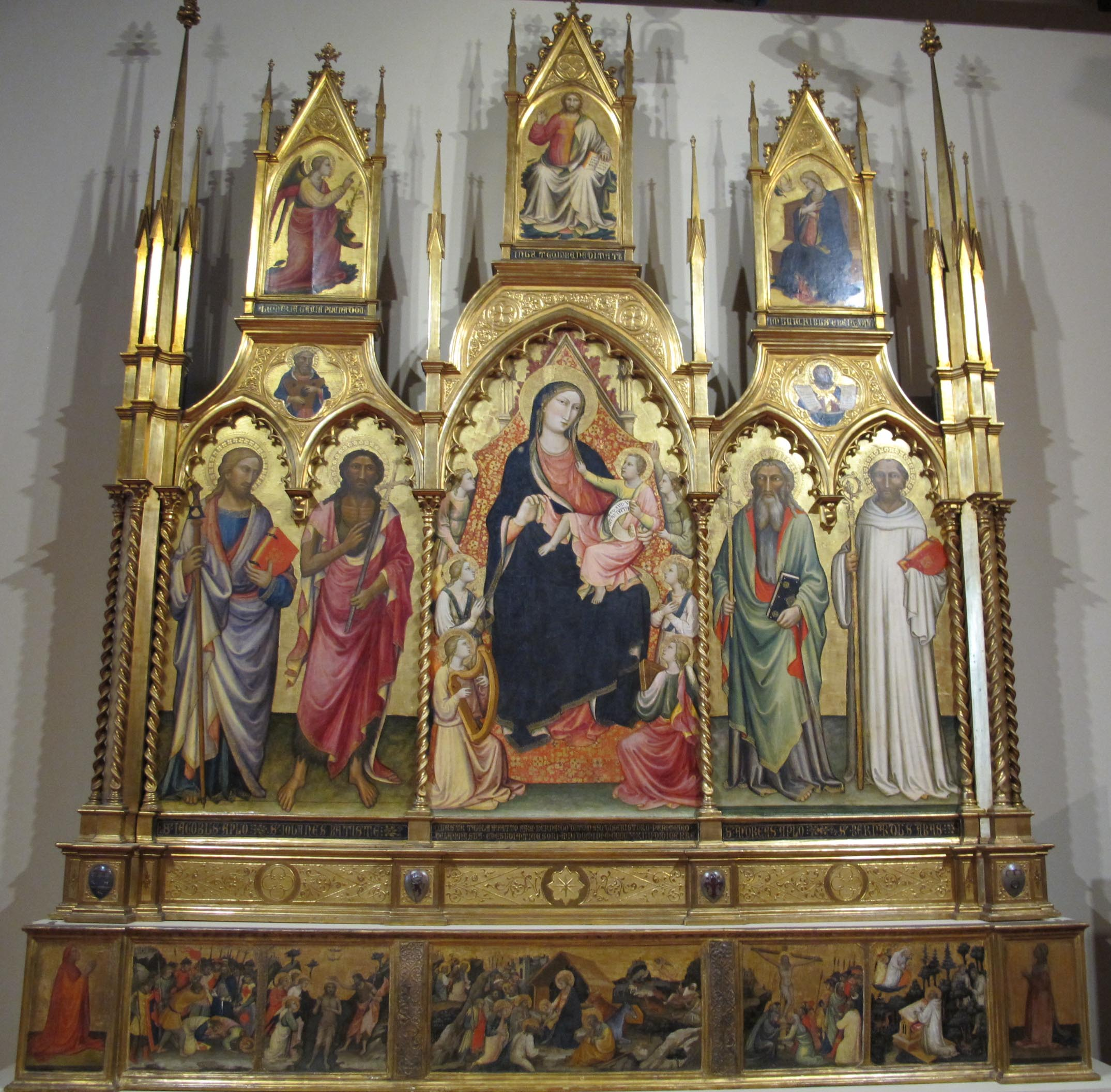
Polittico Serristori, 1424

Through Mariotto's flourishing years, stylistic change is noticed in his works. From his early works, such as the large polyptych in the church of S. Donnino at Villamagna in 1394–1395 (his first known artistic commitment), to his large polyptych in the Serristori house in Florence (shown to the right), his stylistic elements noticeably shifted. Mariotto had originally preferred to arrange bold, powerful figures who move their heavy burdens with grace. In the first decade of the 14th century, he advanced his style by lightening the weight of his figures and using more subtle and less dramatic line weight to give a more elegant and delicate persona to his figures. These new elements were heavily influenced by, and seen as parallel to, Lorenzo Monaco.

== Surviving works ==
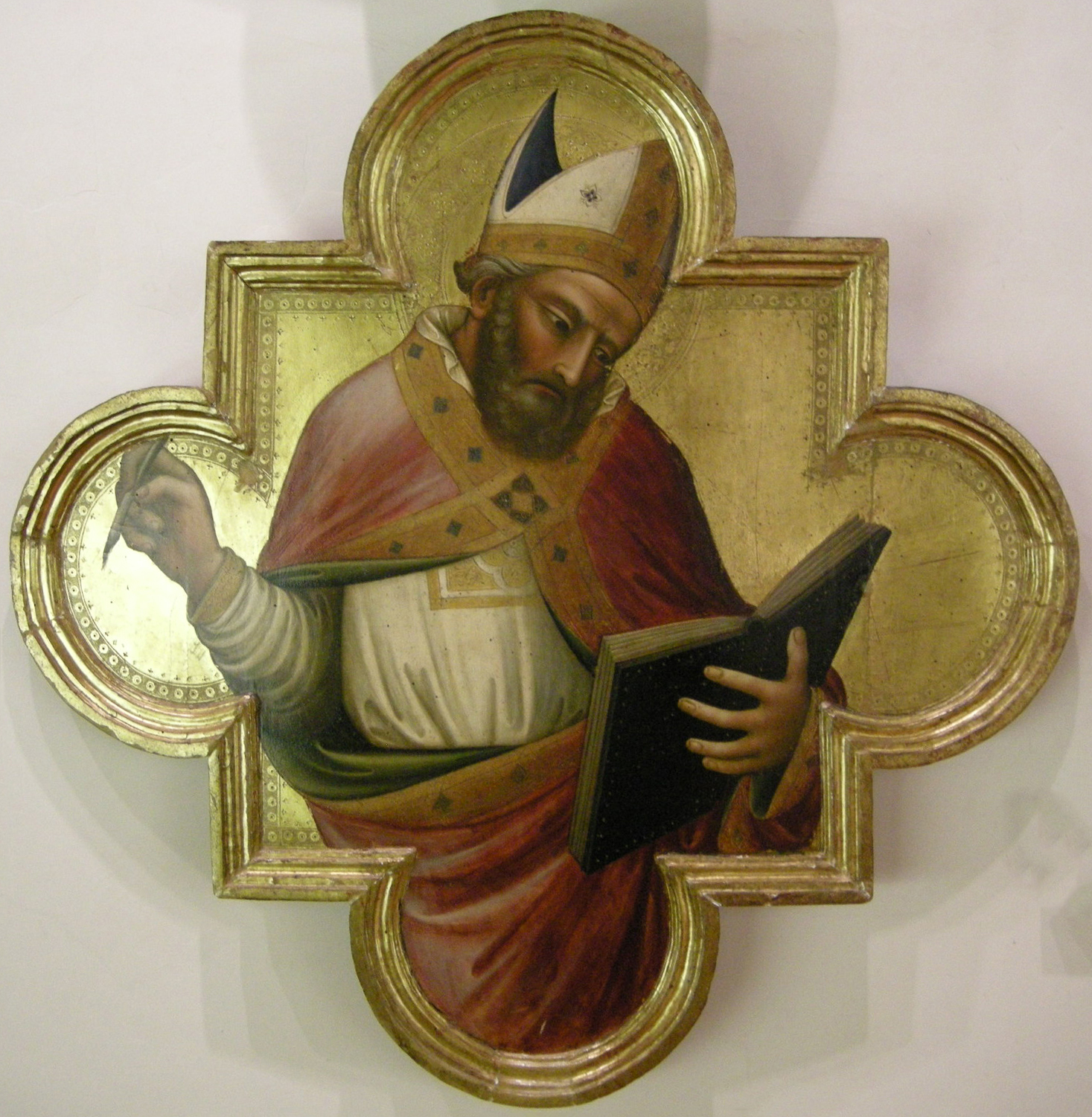
Dottore della chiesa

A relatively large number of securely attributed works by Mariotto survive. These include an altarpiece of the Virgin and Child with Saints for the church of S Donnino at Villamagna, Bagno a Ripoli (in situ); a triptych of the Assumption of the Virgin with St Jerome and St John the Evangelist (1398; Fiesole, Fontelucente Church); a polyptych of the Virgin and Child with Saints and a predella with scenes from the Life of the Virgin (Florence, Accad.) from the convent of S Gaggio, Florence; the Coronation of the Virgin (Florence, Certosa del Galluzzo, Pin.); the Trinity (Impruneta, S Maria); and an altarpiece of the Virgin and Child Enthroned with Saints for S Leolino at Panzano in Chianti (in situ).

== List of works ==
- Frescoes in the pharmacy of Santa Maria Novella in Florence
- Triptych (1394–1395) in the church of San Donnino at Villamagna
- Altarpiece for Cappella Serristori in Chiesa di San Francesco in Figline Valdarno, collection of Fondazione Cariprato
- Il Giardino d'Amore, now in Liechtenstein
- Virgin in Glory with the Apostles
- Madonna with Child and Two Benefactors (1404) and Ascension of Christ (1405–1410), Treasure Museum of the Basilica of Saint Francis in Assisi (F. M. Perkins collection)
- Virgin with Child, Four Saints and Three Angel Musicians
- Pentecost
- Saint John the Baptist and Saint John the Evangelist (1408), Getty Museum
- Saint Lawrence and Saint Stephen (1408), Getty Museum
- Saint Francis Receives the Stigmata, Metropolitan Museum of Art, New York
- Doctors of the Church (1404), Museo dell'Opera del Duomo, Florence
- The Legend of Saint Stephen (1408), National Museum of Western Art, Tokyo
- Annunciation (1400–1410), Hermitage, Saint Petersburg
- Arcita und Palemone erblicken Emilia (Szenen aus der Teseida des Giovanni Boccaccio) (ca. 1430), Staatsgalerie Stuttgart, Stuttgart
- Madonna and Christ Child with Angels and Saints Mary Magdalene, Francis, Dorothy, and Anthony Abbot (1394–1424), Birmingham Museum of Art, Birmingham, Alabama
- Saint Bartholemew and Saint Anthony (1408), Minneapolis Institute of Arts, Minneapolis
- Scenes from the Life of Jesus Christ:

- Noli me tangere
- Ascensione
- Risurrezione
- Crocifissione

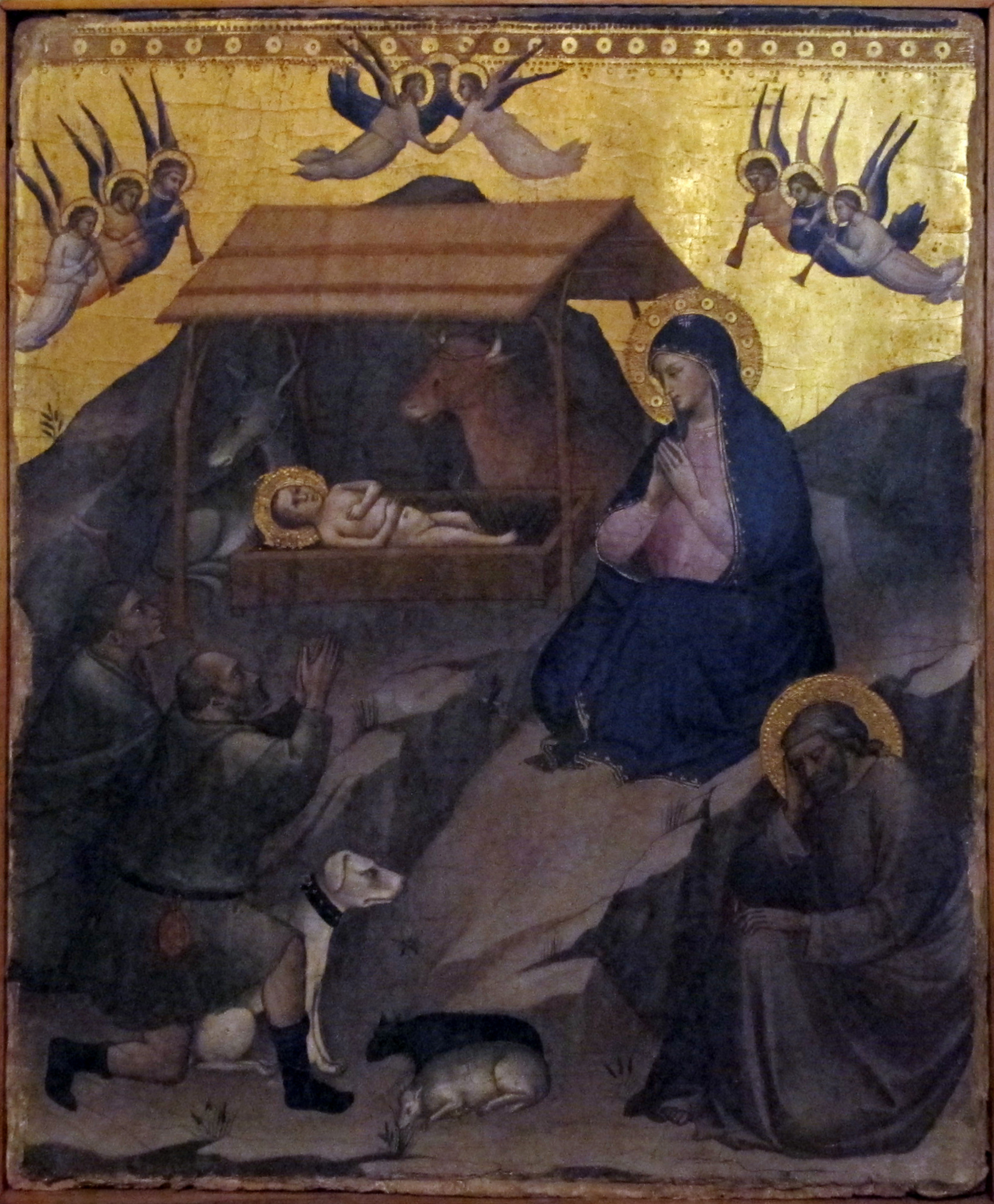
Natività, ca. 1385

- Natività, ca. 1385, now in the Vatican Museums
- Natività, Vatican Museums
- Pietà
- Flagellazione
- Deposizione
- Ultima cena

- The Passion, a series of small panels, in museums in Nantes, Princeton and New Brunswick; the Fondazione Roberto Longhi in Florence and various private collections.
