= Giuseppe Santelli =

Italian painter

Giuseppe Santelli (Signa, January 20, 1880 – Signa, March 9, 1956) was an Italian painter.
