= Giovanna da Signa =

Italian recluse and Blessed

Blessed Giovanna da Signa
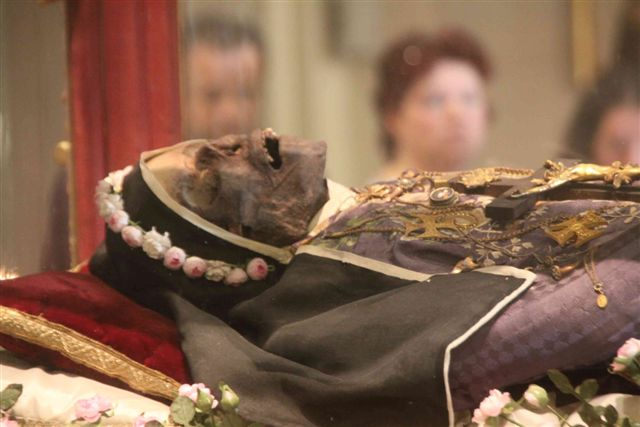
- Relics of Blessed Giovanna da Signa

Virgin
- Born: ca. 1245; Signa, Florence, Republic of Florence
- Died: 9 November 1307; Signa, Florence, Republic of Florence
- Venerated in: Roman Catholic Church
- Beatified: 21 September 1798, Florence, Grand Duchy of Tuscany by Pope Pius VI
- Feast: 9 November, 17 November (in the Order of Friars Minor)

Giovanna da Signa (1245 – 9 November 1307) was an Italian Roman Catholic from Florence and a recluse with a reputation for being a miracle worker. Her life was spent in silent solitude dedicated to God and she remained a virgin throughout her life as part of her consecration to God.

Her beatification was celebrated in Florence under Pope Pius VI in 1798 and was the last beatification of this pope's reign.

== Life ==
Giovanna was born in Signa in a castle along the Arno River in Florence.

In 1268 she became a recluse in a small cave in Signa and decided to consecrate her life – and indeed her entire period of solitude – to God while deciding to remain chaste in further service to him. She garnered a formidable reputation for working miracles in her life though at least six have been recorded during her life.

=== Beatification ===
Giovanna died on 9 November 1307, and her remains were housed in the church of San Giovanni Battista. Her local "cultus" (or popular devotion) gained considerable impetus in 1348 after the cessation of an epidemic that was credited to her intercession. The Vallombrosans and the Franciscans have claimed her as a member as have the Carmelites and Augustinians but this is proven to be falsified information. 21 miracles were credited to her for an undetermined period after her death.

Pope Pius VI beatified her on 21 September 1798 during his exile in Florence. Her beatification was the last to be celebrated in that pope's reign.

Celebrations were held from 16 November 2006 until 16 November 2007 to mark seven centuries since her death; Pope Benedict XVI issued a special indulgence for those who participated in special events for those commemorations.
