= Domenico Trentacoste =

Italian sculptor (1859–1933)

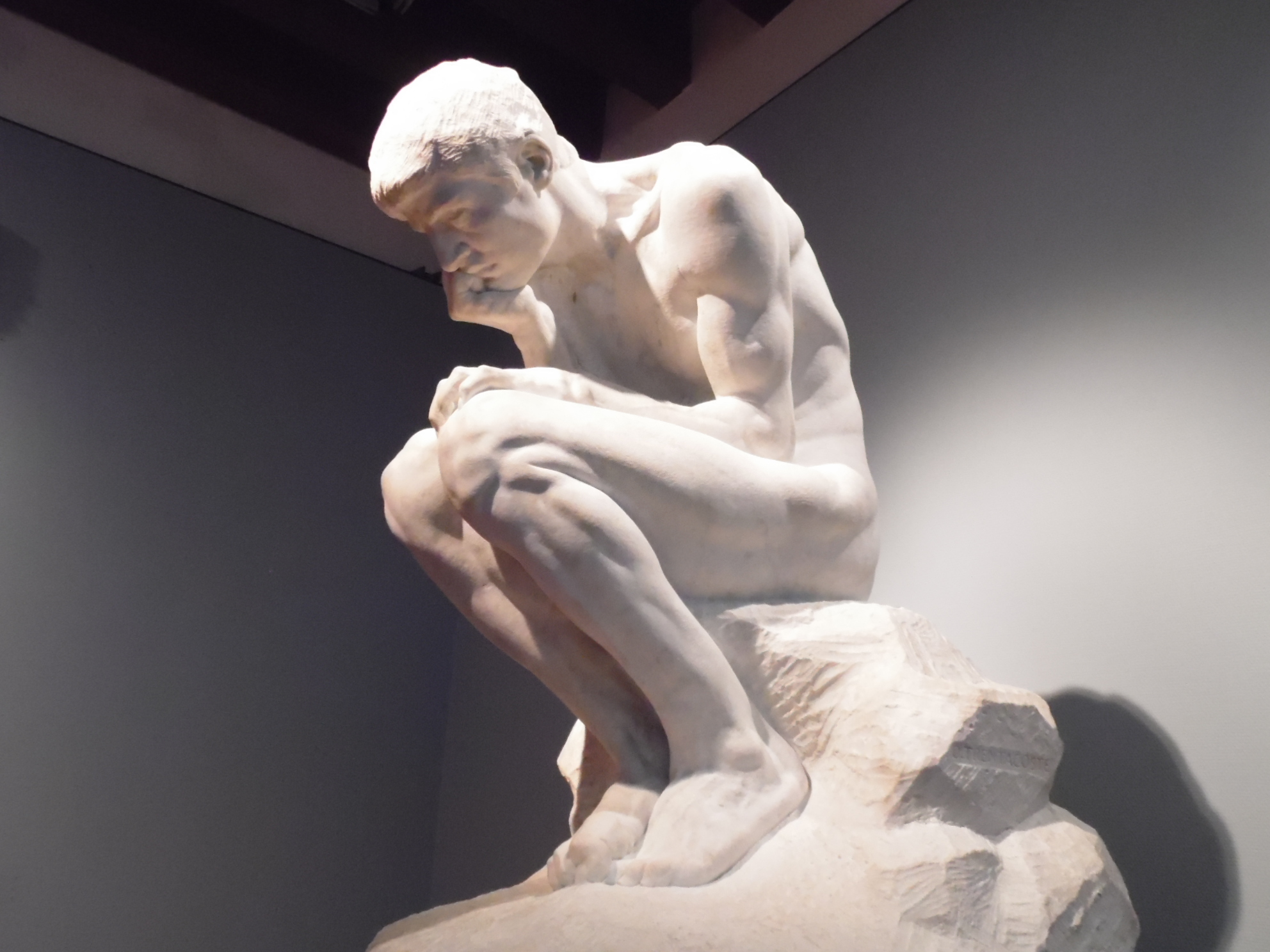
Domenico Trentacoste: Caino (post 1903). Galleria d’Arte Moderna (Palermo)

Domenico Trentacoste (20 September 1859 – 18 March 1933) was an Italian sculptor.

== Biography ==
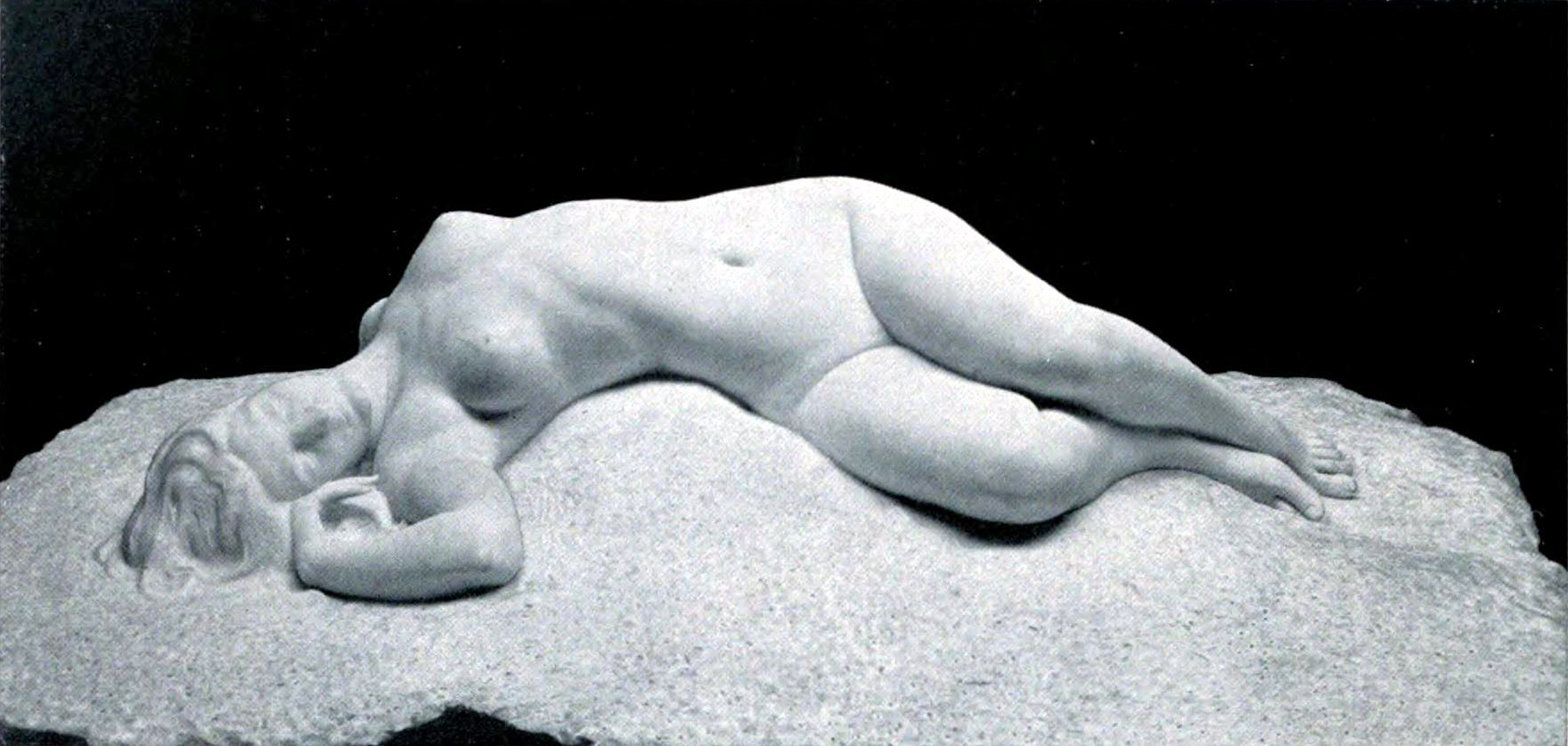
Reclining Nude Woman.

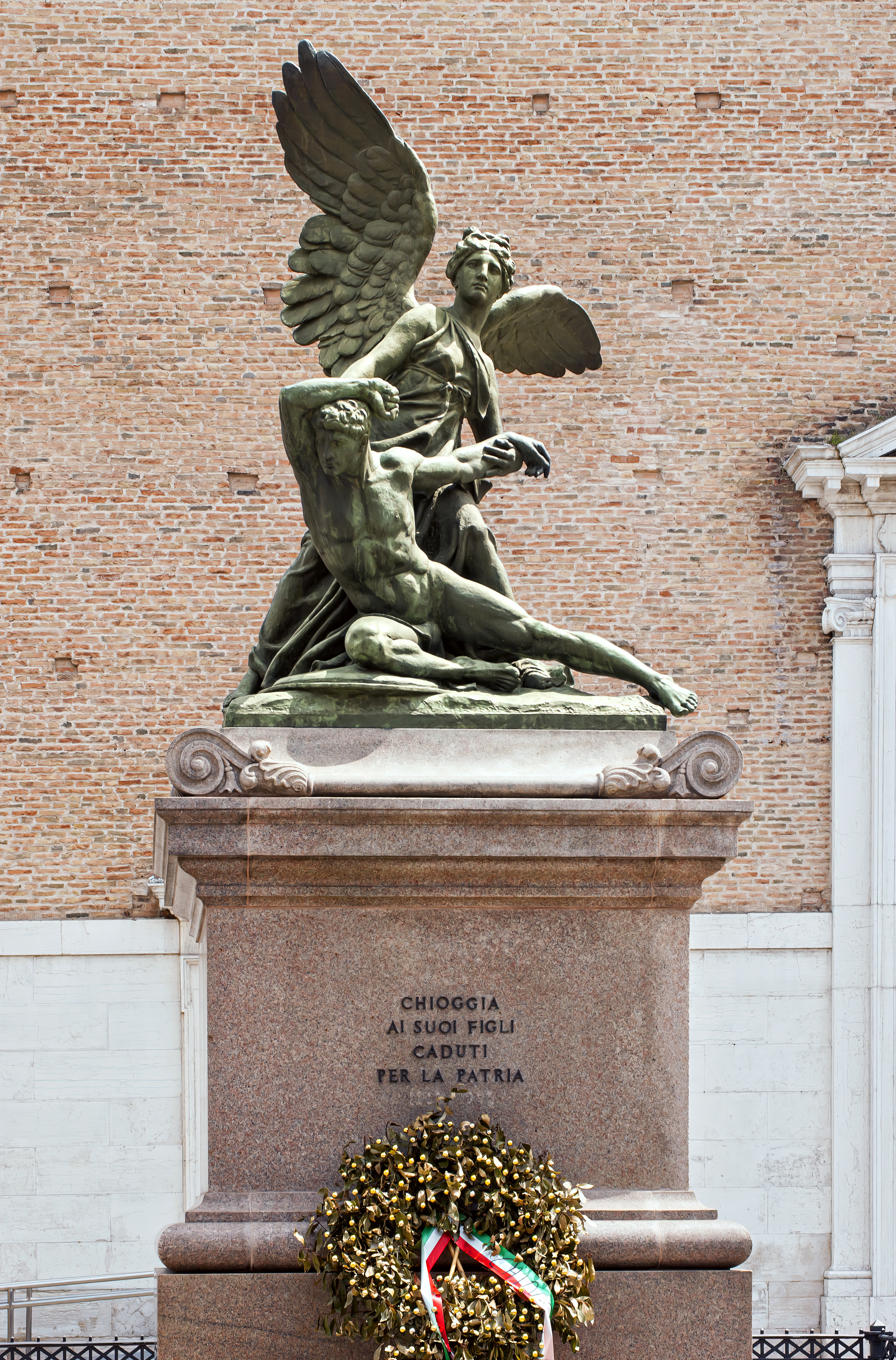
War memorial in Chioggia (Venice)

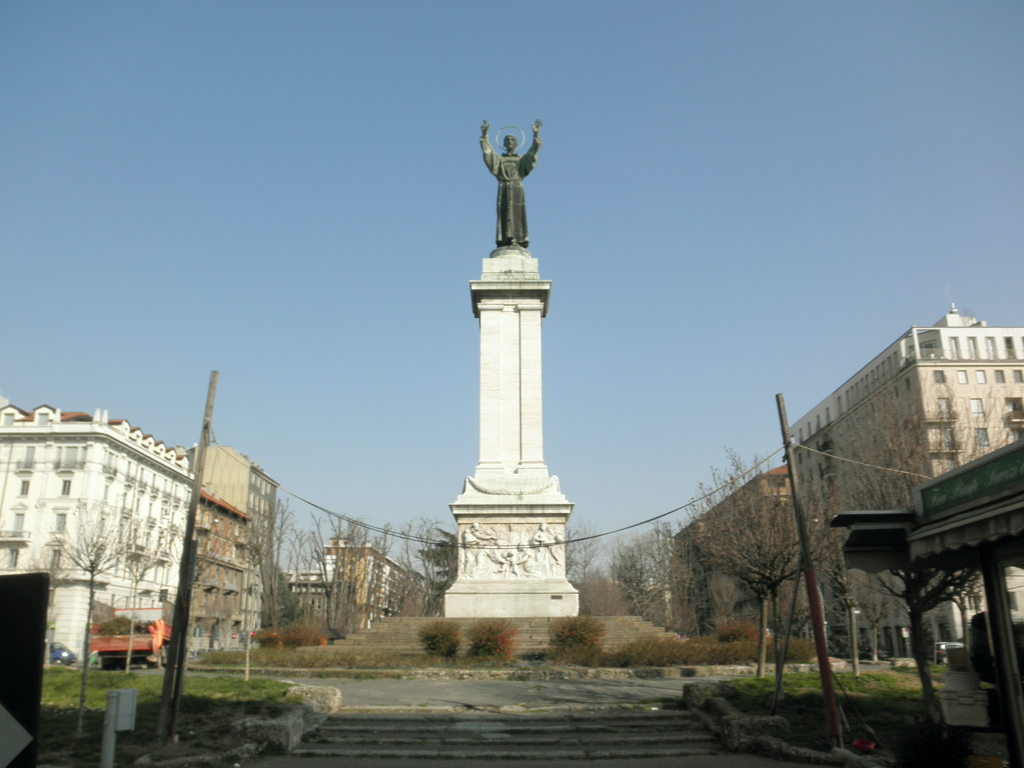
St Francis of Assisi in Piazza di Risorgimento, Milan.

Born in Palermo, Kingdom of the Two Sicilies; at the age of 12 years, Trentacoste began apprenticing with the sculptor Domenico Costantino. As a young man he travelled through Italy, including Naples, and spent some years in Florence starting in 1878. The commission of a triumphal arch made for the visit of King Umberto I garnered Trentacoste enough money to move to Paris in 1880, where he met with the sculptor Antonio Giovanni Lanzirotti.

Trentacoste worked in both marble and bronze and was commonly exhibited at the annual Salon of Paris, where he exhibited bust portraits Lanzirotti and the sculptor De Gravillon; the busts of the French deputies Jolibos and Lalou; Coronel Herbillon and his wife. The Signore Faure of Paris, had four family portraits by the artist. Two marble Ponsona, and un group of Diana were found in the palace of the Count De Rancy in Paris. Trentacoste sculpted the marble funeral monument of Il raccoglimento, dedicated to his sister, Maria Antonietta Trentacoste, and found in the cemetery di Santo Spirito, in Palermo. His work Return from the Grape Harvest was cast into bronze. Other works include Ophelia; Beatrice and I'edera. His Pia de' Tolomei was bought by the English painter Edwin Long, who had introduced him to buyers in London.

For many years, Trentacoste taught at the Academy of Fine Arts in Tuscany. Among his pupils were Torello Santini, Bruno Catarzi, Mario Moschi, Marino Marini, Paolo Abbate, and Giuseppe De Angelis.
