= Paolo Abbate =

- Born: Paolo Salvatore Abbate; April 9, 1884; Villarosa, Sicily, Italy
- Died: April 1, 1973 (aged 88); Torrington, Connecticut, United States
- Known for: Sculptor; Curator

Paolo (Paul) Salvatore Abbate (April 9, 1884 – April 1, 1973) was an Italian-born sculptor and minister who lived and worked in Connecticut.

== Personal life and education ==
Paolo Abbate was born in Villarosa on the Italian island of Sicily. He studied under Domenico Trentacoste, director of the Accademia di Belle Arti Firenze. In 1902, he moved to the United States. Abbate was a missionary for seven years for the American Missionary Association in Pittsfield, Massachusetts before moving to Torrington, Connecticut in 1928 where he established the Sul Monte Art Association, which sponsored exhibitions of the work of local artists. His studio became a gathering place for artists and art enthusiasts. He went on to found the Torrington Artists Association and to co-found the Torrington Unico National organization.

== Career ==
Abbate was a Realist sculptor who worked with bronze and marble. He served as the president of the International Fine Arts League and was a member of numerous professional organizations such as the National Sculpture Society, Kent Art Association and the Connecticut Artists & Writers Society.

== Notable collections ==
- Brown University, Providence, Rhode Island
- City of Newburgh, Newburgh, New York
- Mattatuck Museum Arts and History Center, Waterbury, Connecticut
- National Arts Club, New York City
- Torrington Historical Society, Torrington, Connecticut

== Selected works ==
- Bust of Dante Alighieri, Brown University (bronze, granite base, c. 1900)
- Bust of Dante Alighieri, Newburgh Free Library courtyard (1921)
- Imagination, Mattatuck Museum, Waterbury (bronze)
- Seated female nude, Mattatuck Museum, Waterburg (bronze)
