= Cimitero delle Porte Sante =

Monumental cemetery in Florence, Italy

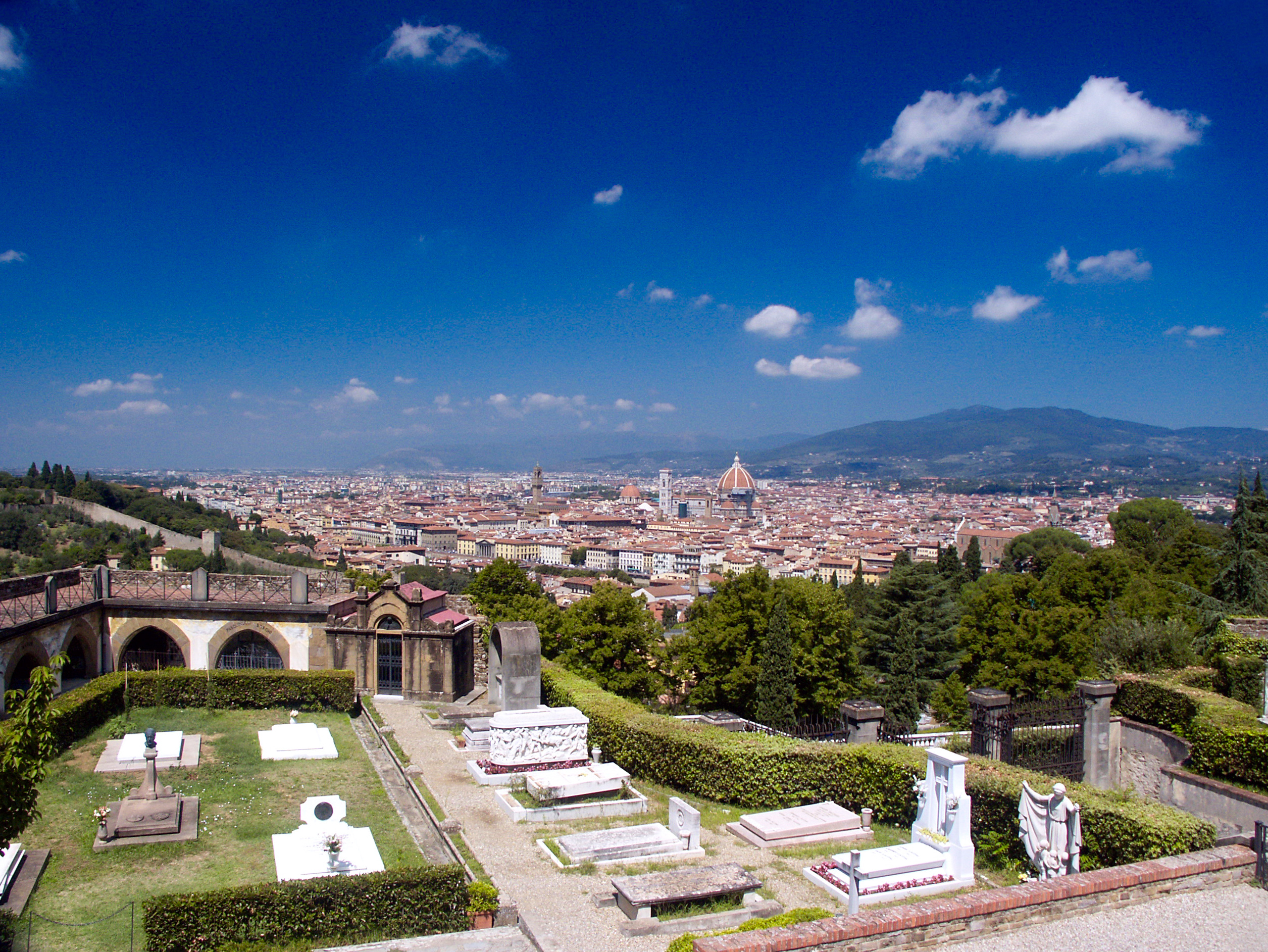
- Interactive map of Cimitero delle Porte Sante

Details
- Established: 1837
- Country: Italy
- Coordinates: 43°45′32″N 11°15′51″E

Cimitero delle Porte Sante (The Sacred Doors Cemetery) is a monumental cemetery in Florence located within the fortified bastion of the Basilica of San Miniato al Monte.

== History ==
The idea of establishing a burial place near San Miniato dates back to around 1837, although the cemetery was inaugurated eleven years later, in 1848.

The project was designed by the architect Niccolò Matas, who also designed the façade of the Basilica of Santa Croce. In 1864, the cemetery was enlarged by Mariano Falcini, using the area occupied by the sixteenth-century fortress that once extended around the church.

A decisive role was played by Count Piero Masetti de' Dainelli da Bagnano, appointed in 1838 as a deputy of the Opera of Spiritual Exercises, and even more so by the widow of his nephew, Pier Pompeo Masetti: Virginia Middleton, who, following her husband's death, relinquished her claims, and wished for ownership and management of the Porte Sante Cemetery to pass to the Municipality of Florence.

Against a background of financial difficulties in maintaining the basilica, Piero Masetti proposed, in 1841, the construction of a cemetery adjacent to the complex. The project responded both to the need to raise funds through burial fees and to the need to improve the hygienic conditions of burials within the city. The initiative obtained the approval of Grand Duke Leopold II and led, in 1844, to the official decision to build the monumental cemetery, entrusting its management to the Opera.

The implementation of the project was personally overseen by Count Masetti, with the involvement of the architect Niccolò Matas in the design and, subsequently, of other technicians in the completion of the work. The administration of the cemetery remained for a long time in the hands of the Masetti family, first with Piero and then with his nephew Pier Pompeo, and was based on a precise organisation of economic activities, including the sale of chapels and burial plots, the management of the different burial classes, and the recording of income and expenditure, some of which was also allocated to the restoration of the basilica.

Private management guaranteed the development and maintenance of the complex until the beginning of the twentieth century. Following the death of Pier Pompeo Masetti, ownership and administration of the cemetery passed to the Municipality of Florence, with the involvement of his widow, Virginia Middleton, marking the definitive transition to public management.

== Bibliografia ==
- Foresto Niccolai, ed. (1997). L'urne de' forti, monumenti e iscrizioni sepolcrali. Firenze: Coppini Tipografi. ISBN 8887287023.
- Gigi Salvagnini, ed. (2011). Porte Sante - Il cimitero di San Miniato a Firenze. Firenze: Opuslibri.
- Fausta Valentina Antonelli; Jessica Consalvi; Manuela Masenello, eds. (2018). Al di là delle Porte Sante - Studi di conservazione e restauro dei monumenti sepolcrali di San Miniato al Monte. Roma: Universitalia. ISBN 978-8832931242.
- Marion Castelbarco Albani, San Miniato al Monte. Il cimitero monumentale. Documenti inediti e vicende storiche, con la collaborazione di Sara Piccolo, Firenze, Giampiero Pagnini Editore, 2019, ISBN 978-88-8251-503-4

== Notable tombs ==
In addition to many neo-Gothic architectural features, the cemetery holds the burial sites of many illustrious figures, including:

- Giuseppe Abbati
- Libero Andreotti
- Pietro Annigoni
- Pellegrino Artusi
- Orazio Bacci
- Lazar Berman
- Luigi Bertelli (Vamba)
- Alessandro Bonsanti
- Mario Cecchi Gori (with his wife Valeria)
- Anna Maria Chiavacci Leonardi
- Alimondo Ciampi
- Bruno Cicognani
- Carlo Collodi
- Enrico Coveri
- Felice Le Monnier
- Claudio Leonardi
- Guido Manacorda
- Ferruccio Masini
- Lorenzo Orsetti
- Giovanni Papini
- Marietta Piccolomini
- Ermenegildo Pistelli
- Paolo Poli
- Vasco Pratolini
- Rodolfo Marma
- Renzo Ricci
- Brass Roses
- Bruno Rossi
- Gaetano Salvemini
- Tommaso Salvini
- Giorgio Saviane
- Odoardo Spadaro
- Giovanni Spadolini
- Angelo Torchi
- Luigi Ugolini
- Pasquale Villari
- Franco Zeffirelli

== Notes ==
- Foresto Niccolai (ed.), The urns of the strong, monuments and burial inscriptions, Coppini Tipografi, Florence, September 1997.
- Valeria Paniccia, Walking in the meadows of eternity, Mursia Editore, 2013
- Aldi there of the Holy Doors – Studies of conservation and restoration of the burial monuments, Florence, Palazzo Spinelli, 2016
