= Master of Signa =

Italian painter

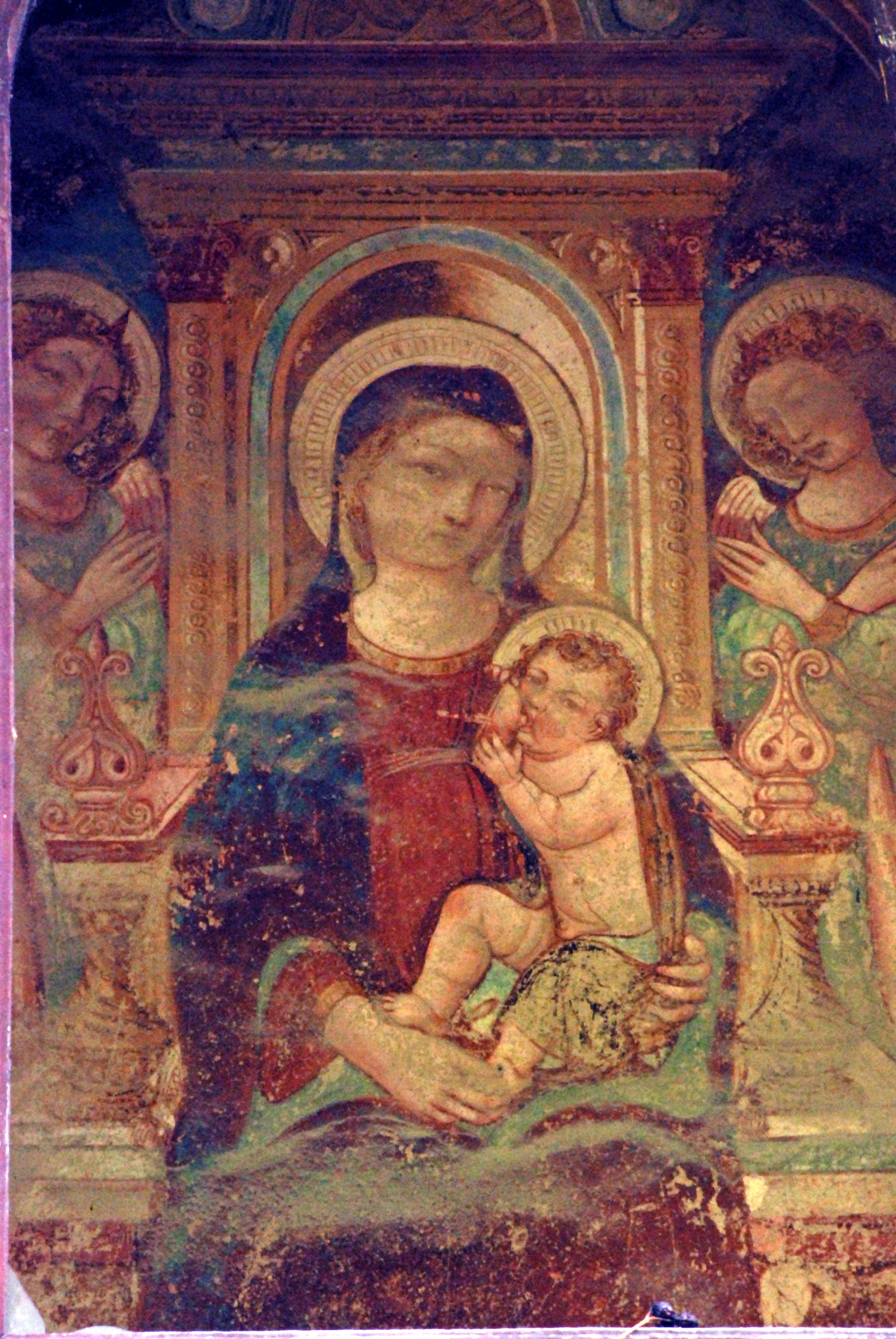
Tabernacle di Castelbonsi

The Master of Signa (Italian: Maestro di Signa) refers to an anonymous 15th-century Italian painter active in the area of Signa, region of Tuscany, Italy.
