= Antonio Giovanni Lanzirotti =

Italian sculptor (1839–1921)

Antonio Giovanni Lanzirotti (7 May 1830 – 28 February 1911) was an Italian sculptor.

== Biography ==
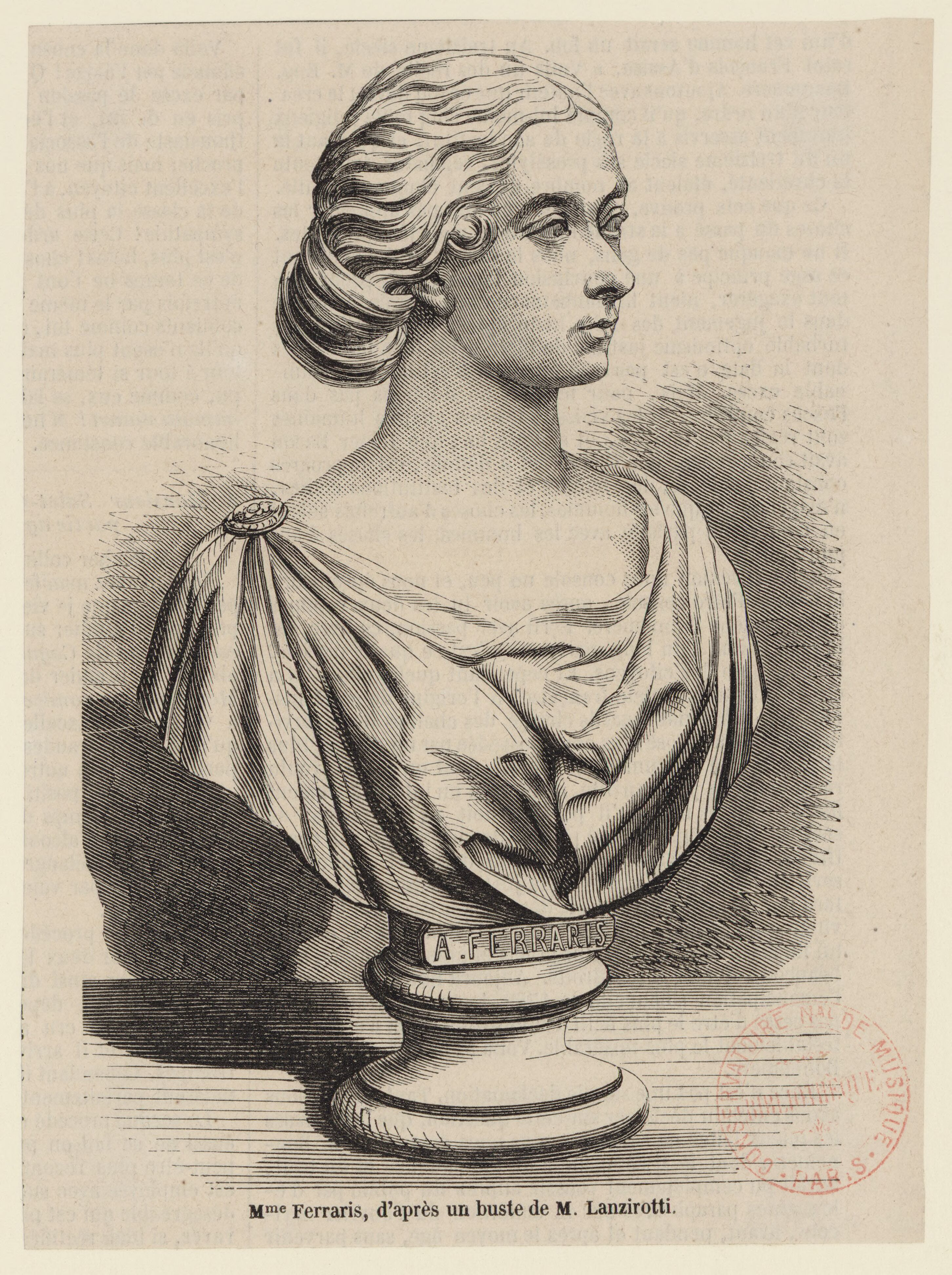
Amalia Ferraris, 1857

He was born in Palermo, where he completes his studies. He then travels to Paris, to work under Joseph Michel Ange Pollet. He was a fierce proponent of Sicilian Independence, and militated under General Ignazio Ribotti in the first grenadiers of Piedmont. His first work was The Education of Bacchus, exhibited at the 1855 World Exposition at Paris. In 1863 he went to Turin, where King Vittorio Emanuele II commissioned statues of the Conte Verde and Duke Vittorio Amedeo I. He sends to Paris, a statue La pensieroso, another La schiava, the first found in London, and the second sold to the museum of Nice.

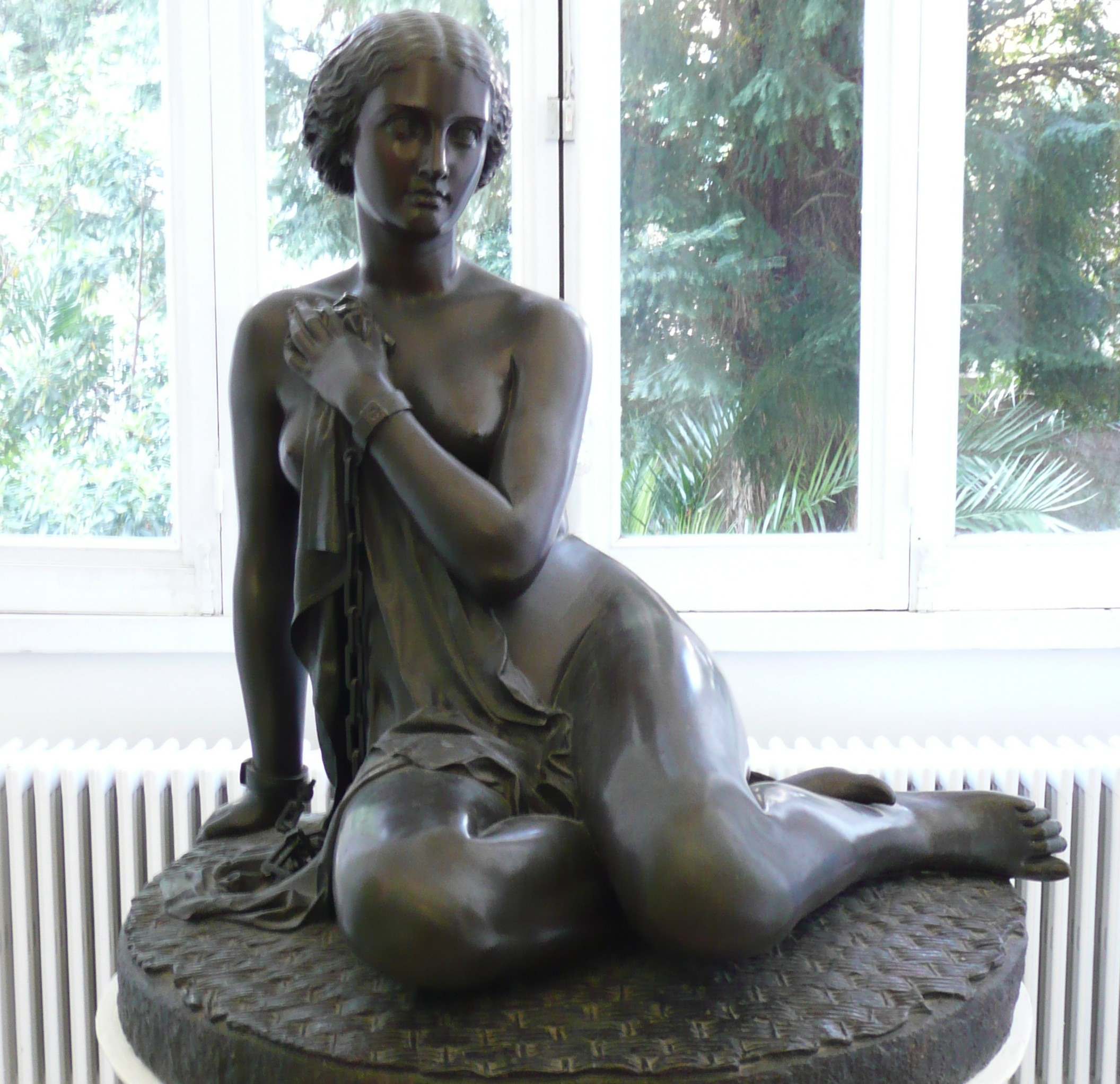
Greek slave, 1858

In 1860 he joined the movement of Garibaldi, and was made prisoner at Capo Corso, he was imprisoned for two months at Gaeta, then returned to Paris. There he completed: Amore punito; La Danza; the Mausoleum of Count Tyzhieviez, and a bather which he exhibited at the Salon. Scolpi also sculpted Il Piacere; and La Follia. He also completed many busts and portraits, including those of Cassagnac, of M. Girardin, of Doctor Armand Trousseau, of the writer Pierre Beaumarchais, of the King Umberto I. Lanzirotti was named to many Academies, and was awarded the Cross of Knights of Saints Maurizio and Lazzaro, inducted into the Order of the Crown of Italy, and awarded the Order of Isabel the Catholic.
