= Democratic Autonomous Administration of North and East Syria =

De facto region in Syria (2012–2026)

Democratic Autonomous Administration of North and East Syria Native names: الإدارة الذاتية الديمقراطية لإقليم شمال وشرق سوريا (Arabic); Rêveberiya Xweseriya Demokratîk a Herêma Bakur û Rojhilatê Sûriyê (Kurdish); ܡܕܒܪܢܘܬ݂ܳܐ ܝܬ݂ܝܬܳܐ ܕܝܡܩܪܐܛܝܬܳܐ ܠܩܠܝܡܳܐ ܕܓܪܒܝܳܐ ܘ ܡܕܢܚܳܐ ܕܣܘܪܝܰܐ (Classical Syriac); Kuzey ve Doğu Suriye Demokratik Özerk Yönetimi Bölgesi (Turkish)
- 2012–2026
- Flag (Note: The DAANES recognized and flew the revolution flag from 12 December 2024 until 20 August 2026.) (2018–2026) Emblem (Note: A variety of symbols and flags are used. See Symbols of North and East Syria.) (2018–2026)

- Status: Quasi-state
- Capital and largest city: Al-Hasakah (Note: Ayn Issa (2012–2026) De facto: Qamishli (2015–2019)); 36°29′55″N 40°44′45″E
- Official languages: Arabic; Kurdish (Kurmanji); Syriac
- Government: Autonomous diarchic presidential government
- Co-Presidents
  - 2016–2018 (first): Hediya Yousef and Mansur Selum
  - 2018–2026 (last): Îlham Ehmed and Mansur Selum
- Co-Chairs
  - 2015–2016 (first): Haytham Manna and Amina Omar
  - 2016–2026 (last): Riad Darar and Amina Omar
- Legislature: People's Democratic Council (2015–2026)
- Historical era: Rojava conflict; Syrian civil war; Aftermath of the Syrian civil war
  - Established as the Kurdish Supreme Committee: 12 July 2012
  - Transitional administration declared: 2013
  - Cantons declare autonomy: January 2014
  - Cantons declare federation: 17 March 2016
  - New administration declared: 6 September 2018
  - North-Eastern Syria offensive: 13–30 January 2026
  - Integration into the Syrian state: 20 August 2026

Area
  - Total: 3,800 sq mi (9,800 km^{2})(2019)

Population
  - 2024 estimate: 4,600,000
- Currency: Syrian pound (SYP)
- Time zone: UTC+3 (Arabia Standard Time)
- Website daanes.org/en/homepage/
Preceded by	Succeeded by
Ba'athist Syria; Islamic State	Syrian Arab Republic

The Democratic Autonomous Administration of North and East Syria (DAANES), also known as Rojava, (Note: The name "Rojava" ("Western Kurdistan") was initially used by the region's PYD-led government, before its usage was officially dropped in 2016. Locals and international observers continued to use the term Rojava.) was a de facto autonomous region in northeastern Syria from 2012 until its integration into the Syrian state in 2026. At various points during its existence, it consisted of the self-governing sub-regions of Afrin, Jazira, Euphrates, Raqqa, Tabqa, Manbij, and Deir ez-Zor. The region conducted some foreign relations, but was not officially recognized as autonomous by the Syrian government or any other state, although the Parliament of Catalonia recognized it.

The region gained its de facto autonomy in 2012 amid the Rojava conflict and the wider Syrian civil war, with its official military force, the Syrian Democratic Forces (SDF), participating in the conflict. Northeastern Syria was polyethnic and was home to sizeable ethnic Arab, Kurdish, and Assyrian populations, with smaller communities of ethnic Turkmen, Armenians, Circassians, and Yazidis. Independent organizations that provided healthcare in the region included the Kurdish Red Crescent, the Syrian American Medical Society, the Free Burma Rangers, and Doctors Without Borders.

From 2016 until 2026, Turkish and Turkish-backed Syrian rebel forces occupied parts of northern Syria through a series of military operations against the SDF. In January 2026, the Syrian transitional government took full control of the territory previously controlled by Turkish and Turkish-backed Syrian rebel forces.

Following the January 2026 northeastern Syria offensive by government forces, up to 80% of the DAANES's territory was captured and subsequently ceded to the Syrian government as part of an integration agreement, culminating in the DAANES's full integration into the Syrian state on 20 August 2026.

== Names ==
Parts of northern Syria are known as Western Kurdistan, (Note: Kurdish: Rojavayê Kurdistanê) or simply Rojava (Note: /ˌroʊʒəˈvɑː/ ROH-zhə-VAH; Kurdish: [roʒɑˈvɑ] "the West") among Kurds, one of the four parts of Greater Kurdistan. The name "Rojava" was thus associated with a Kurdish identity of the administration. As the region expanded and increasingly included areas dominated by non-Kurdish groups, mostly Arabs, "Rojava" was used less and less by the administration in hopes of deethnicising its appearance and making it more acceptable to other ethnicities. Regardless, the polity continued to be called "Rojava" by locals and international observers, with journalist Metin Gurcan noting that "the concept of Rojava [had become] a brand gaining global recognition" by 2019.

The territory around Jazira province of northeastern Syria is called Gozarto, (Note: Classical Syriac: ܓܙܪܬܐ, romanized: Gozarto) part of the historical Assyrian homeland, by Syriac-Assyrians. The first name of the local government for the Kurdish-dominated areas in Afrin District, Ayn al-Arab District (Kobanî), and northern al-Hasakah Governorate was "Interim Transitional Administration", adopted in 2013. After the three autonomous cantons were proclaimed in 2014 together with a written Social Contract, territories governed by the Democratic Union Party (PYD) were also nicknamed "the Autonomous Regions" or "Democratic Autonomous Administration". On 17 March 2016, the establishment of a federal system of government known as the Democratic Federation of Rojava – Northern Syria; (Note: Kurdish: Federaliya Demokratîk a Rojava – Bakurê Sûriyê Arabic: الفدرالية الديمقراطية لروج آفا – شمال سوريا, romanized: al-Fidirāliyya al-Dīmuqrāṭiyya li-Rūj ʾĀvā – Šamāl Suriyā Classical Syriac: ܦܕܪܐܠܝܘܬ݂ܐ ܕܝܡܩܪܐܛܝܬܐ ܠܓܙܪܬܐ ܒܓܪܒܝܐ ܕܣܘܪܝܐ, romanized: Federaloyotho Demoqraṭoyto l'Gozarto b'Garbyo d'Suriya) sometimes abbreviated as NSR, was declared.

The updated December 2016 constitution of the polity used the name Democratic Federation of Northern Syria (DFNS). (Note: Kurdish: Federaliya Demokratîk a Bakûrê Sûriyê Arabic: الفدرالية الديمقراطية لشمال سوريا, romanized: al-Fidirāliyya al-Dīmuqrāṭiyya li-Šamāl Suriyā Classical Syriac: ܦܕܪܐܠܝܘܬ݂ܐ ܕܝܡܩܪܐܛܝܬܐ ܕܓܪܒܝ ܣܘܪܝܐ, romanized: Federaloyotho Demoqraṭoyto d'Garbay Suriya) On 6 September 2018, the Syrian Democratic Council adopted a new name for the region, naming it the Autonomous Administration of North and East Syria (NES or AANES) (Note: Kurdish: Rêveberiya Xweser a Bakur û Rojhilatê Sûriyeyê Arabic: الإدارة الذاتية لشمال وشرق سوريا Classical Syriac: ܡܕܰܒܪܳܢܘܬ݂ܳܐ ܝܳܬ݂ܰܝܬܳܐ ܠܓܰܪܒܝܳܐ ܘܡܰܕܢܚܳܐ ܕܣܘܪܝܰܐ, romanized: Mdabronuṯo Yoṯayto l-Garbyo w-Madnḥyo d-Suriya Turkish: Kuzey ve Doğu Suriye Özerk Yönetimi) also sometimes translated into English as the Self-Administration of North and East Syria (SANES), encompassing the Euphrates and Jazira regions as well as the local civil councils in the regions of Raqqa, Tabqa, and Deir ez-Zor. In December 2023, the region adopted a new constitution, with a new name for the region, the Democratic Autonomous Administration of North and East Syria (DAANES). (Note: Kurdish: Rêveberiya Xweseriya Demokratîk a Herêma Bakur û Rojhilatê Sûriyê Arabic: الإدارة الذاتية الديمقراطية لإقليم شمال وشرق سوريا Classical Syriac: ܡܕܒܪܢܘܬ݂ܳܐ ܝܬ݂ܝܬܳܐ ܕܝܡܩܪܐܛܝܬܳܐ ܠܩܠܝܡܳܐ ܕܓܪܒܝܳܐ ܘ ܡܕܢܚܳܐ ܕܣܘܪܝܰܐ, romanized: Mdabronuṯo Yoṯayto Demoqraṭoyto l-Qlimo d-Garbyo w-Madnḥyo d-Suriya Turkish: Kuzey ve Doğu Suriye Demokratik Özerk Yönetimi Bölgesi) The YPG/PYD at times used the names Federal Northern Syria and the Democratic Confederalist Autonomous Areas of Northern Syria.

== History ==
=== Background ===
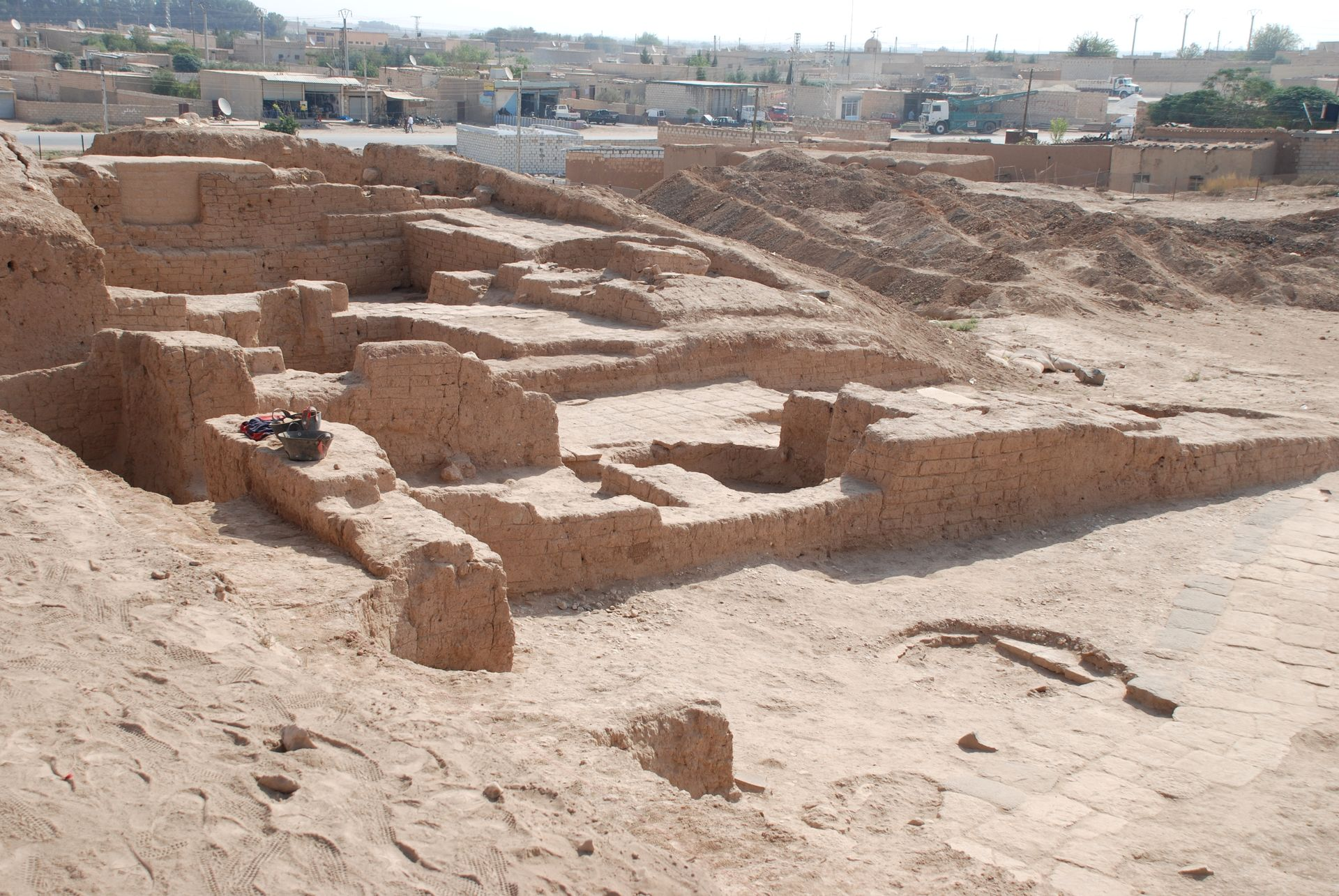
Having been part of the Fertile Crescent, Northern Syria has several Neolithic sites such as Tell Halaf.

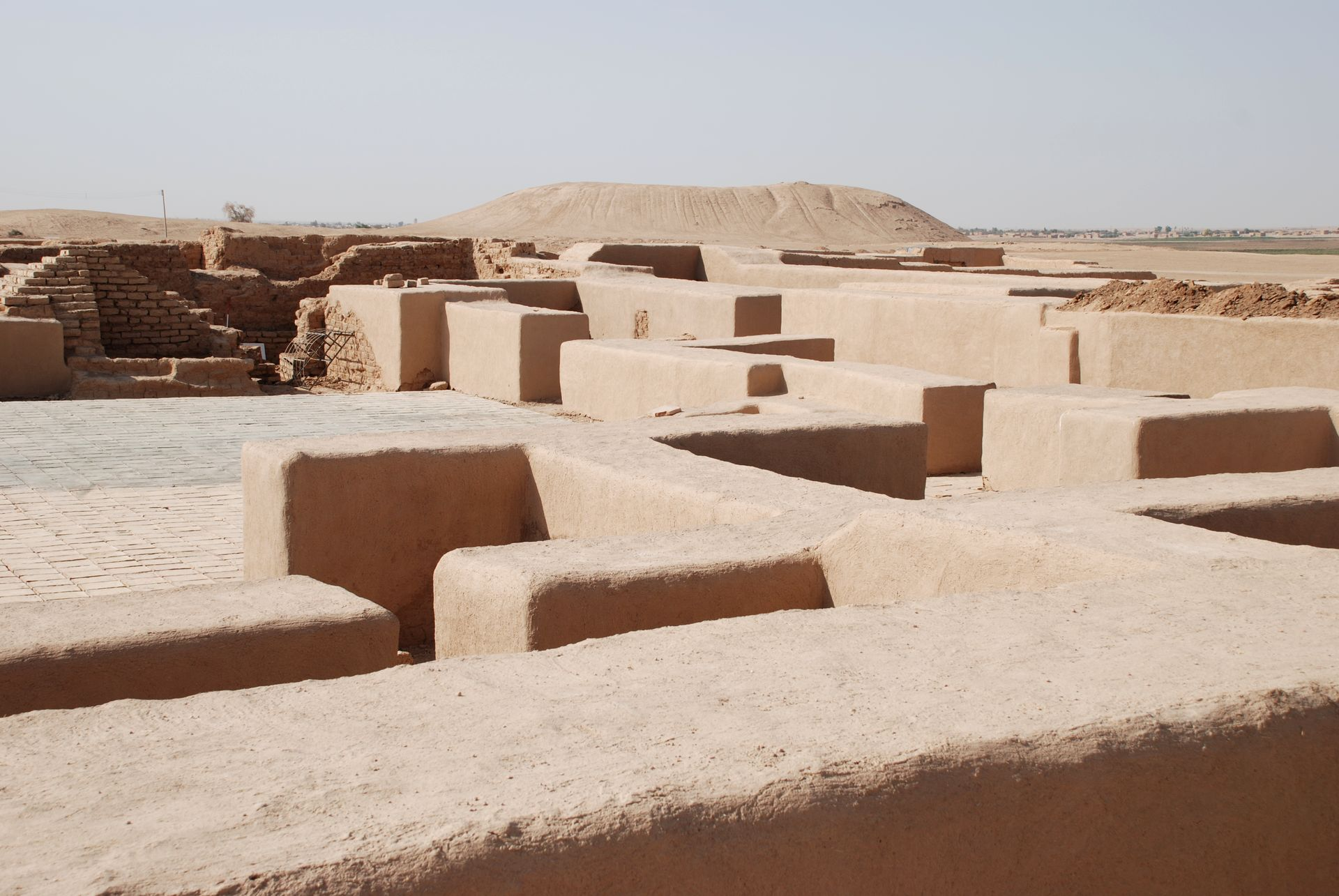
Ruins of the "Red House" of the Assyrian site Dur-Katlimmu exposed by excavations (6th century AD)

Northern Syria is part of the Fertile Crescent, and includes archaeological sites dating to the Neolithic, such as Tell Halaf. In antiquity, the area was part of the Mitanni kingdom, its centre being the Khabur river valley in modern-day Jazira Region. It was then part of Assyria, with the last surviving Assyrian imperial records, from between 604 BC and 599 BC, being found in and around the Assyrian city of Dūr-Katlimmu. Later, it was ruled by different dynasties and empires – the Achaemenids of Iran, the Hellenistic empires that succeeded Alexander the Great, the Artaxiads of Armenia, Rome, the Iranian Parthians and Sasanians, then by the Byzantines and successive Arab Islamic caliphates. In the course of these regimes, different groups settled in northern Syria, often contributing to population shifts. Arab tribes have been present in the area for millennia. Under the Hellenistic Seleucid Empire (312–63 BC), different tribal groups and mercenaries were settled in northern Syria as military colonists; these included Arabs and possibly Kurds. (Note: It was difficult to properly define early Kurds, as "Kurdish" was often used as a catch-all word for nomadic tribal groups west of Iran during antiquity and medieval times.) Jan Retso argued that Abai, an Arab settlement where the Seleucid king Antiochus VI Dionysus was raised, was located in northern Syria. By the 3rd century, the Arab tribe of the Fahmids lived in northern Syria.

By the 9th century, northern Syria was inhabited by a mixed population of Arabs, Assyrians, Kurds, Turkic groups, and others. Kurdish tribes in the area often operated as soldiers for hire, and were still placed in specific military settlements in the northern Syrian mountains. There existed a Kurdish elite of which Saladin, the founder of the Ayyubid dynasty and the Emir of Masyaf in the 12th century were part of. Under Saladin's rule, northern Syria experienced a mass immigration of Turkic groups who came into conflict with Kurdish tribes, resulting in clashes that wiped out several Kurdish communities.

During the Ottoman Empire (1516–1922), large Kurdish-speaking tribal groups both settled in and were deported to areas of northern Syria from Anatolia. By the 18th century, five Kurdish tribes existed in northeastern Syria. The demographics of this area underwent a huge shift in the early part of the 20th century. Some Circassian, Kurdish and Chechen tribes cooperated with the Ottoman (Turkish) authorities in the massacres of Armenian and Assyrian Christians in Upper Mesopotamia, between 1914 and 1920, with further attacks on unarmed fleeing civilians conducted by local Arab militias. Many Assyrians fled to Syria during the genocide and settled mainly in the Jazira area. Starting in 1926, the region saw another immigration of Kurds following the failure of the Sheikh Said rebellion against the Turkish authorities. While many of the Kurds in Syria have been there for centuries, waves of Kurds fled their homes in Turkey and settled in Syrian Al-Jazira Province, where they were granted citizenship by the French Mandate authorities. The number of Turkish Kurds settled in al-Jazira province during the 1920s was estimated at 20,000 people, out of 100,000 inhabitants, with the remainder of the population being Christians (Syriac, Armenian, Assyrian) and Arabs.

=== Syria's independence and rule of the Ba'ath Party ===
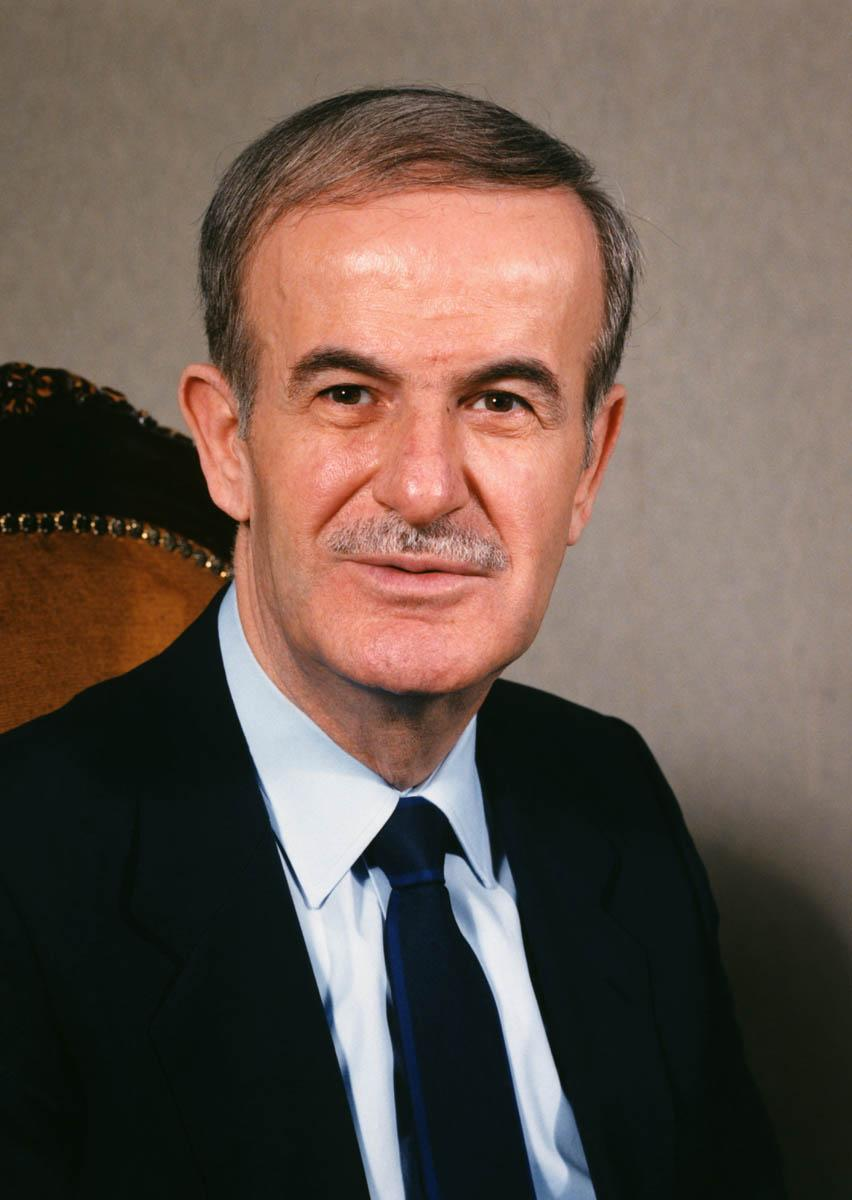
The Ba'athist government of Syria under Hafez al-Assad (pictured c. 1987) implemented Arabization policies in northern Syria.

Following Syria's independence, policies of Arab nationalism and attempts at forced Arabization became widespread in the country's north, to a large part directed against the Kurdish population. The region received little investment or development from the central government, and laws discriminated against Kurds owning property, driving cars, working in certain professions, and forming political parties. Property was routinely confiscated by government loansharks. After the Ba'ath Party seized power in the 1963 Syrian coup d'état, non-Arab languages were forbidden in Syrian public schools. This compromised the education of students belonging to minorities such as Kurds, Turkmen, and Assyrians. Some groups such as Armenians, Circassians, and Assyrians were able to compensate by establishing private schools, but Kurdish private schools were also banned. Northern Syrian hospitals lacked equipment for advanced treatment, and patients instead had to be transferred outside the region. Numerous place names were Arabized in the 1960s and 1970s. In his report for the 12th session of the UN Human Rights Council titled Persecution and Discrimination against Kurdish Citizens in Syria, the United Nations High Commissioner for Human Rights held that "Successive Syrian governments continued to adopt a policy of ethnic discrimination and national persecution against Kurds, completely depriving them of their national, democratic and human rights – an integral part of human existence. The government imposed ethnically-based programs, regulations and exclusionary measures on various aspects of Kurds' lives – political, economic, social and cultural." Kurdish cultural festivals such as Newroz were effectively banned.

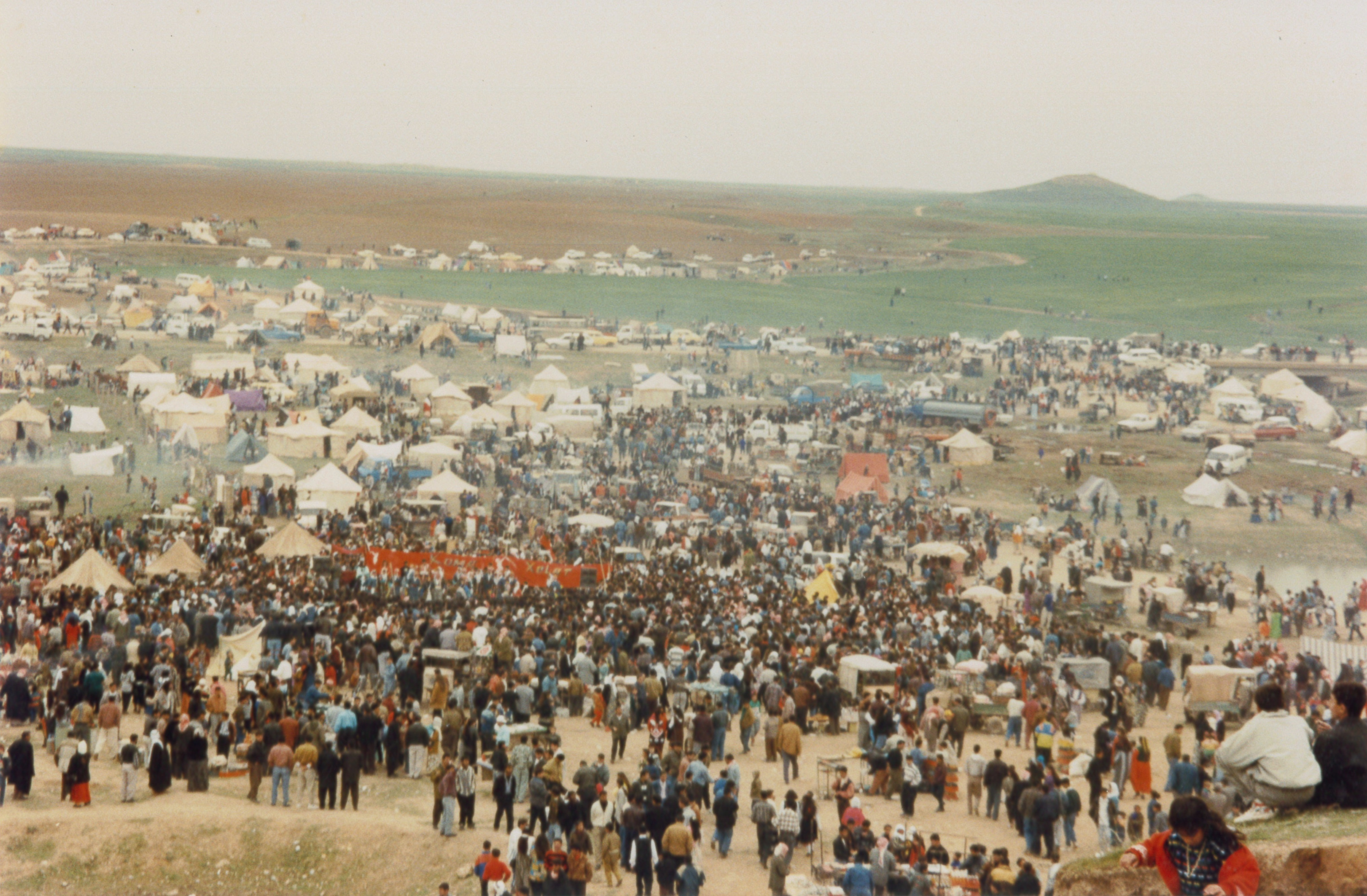
Kurds celebrating Newroz in Girê Tertebê, near Qamishli, in 1997

In many instances, the Syrian government arbitrarily deprived ethnic Kurdish citizens of their citizenship. The largest such instance was a consequence of a census in 1962, which was conducted for exactly this purpose. 120,000 ethnic Kurdish citizens saw their citizenship arbitrarily taken away and became stateless. This status was passed to the children of a "stateless" Kurdish father. In 2010, the Human Rights Watch (HRW) estimated the number of such "stateless" Kurdish people in Syria at 300,000. In 1973, the Syrian authorities confiscated 750 square kilometres (290 square miles) of fertile agricultural land in Al-Hasakah Governorate, which was owned and cultivated by tens of thousands of Kurdish citizens, and gave it to Arab families brought in from other provinces. In 2007, in the Al-Hasakah Governorate, 6,000 square kilometres (2,300 square miles) around Al-Malikiyah were granted to Arab families, while tens of thousands of Kurdish inhabitants of the villages concerned were evicted. These and other expropriations were part of the so-called "Arab Belt initiative", which aimed to change the demographic fabric of the resource-rich region. Accordingly, relations between the Syrian government and the Syrian Kurdish population were tense.

The response of northern Syrian parties and movements to the policies of Hafez al-Assad's Ba'athist government varied greatly. Some parties opted for resistance, whereas others such as the Kurdish Democratic Progressive Party and the Assyrian Democratic Party attempted to work within the system, hoping to bring about changes through soft pressure. In general, parties that openly represented certain ethnic and religious minorities were not allowed to participate in elections, but their politicians were occasionally allowed to run as Independents. Some Kurdish politicians won seats during the Syrian elections in 1990. The government also recruited Kurdish officials, in particular as mayors, to ease ethnic relations. Regardless, northern Syrian ethnic groups remained deliberately underrepresented in the bureaucracy, and many Kurdish-majority areas were run by Arab officials from other parts of the country. Security and intelligence agencies worked hard to suppress dissidents, and most Kurdish parties remained underground movements. The government monitored, though generally allowed, this "sub-state activity" because the northern minorities, including the Kurds, rarely caused unrest, with the exception of the 2004 Qamishli massacre. The situation improved after the death of Hafez al-Assad and the election of his son, Bashar al-Assad, under whom the number of Kurdish officials grew.

Despite the Ba'athist internal policies that officially suppressed a Kurdish identity, the Syrian government allowed the Kurdistan Workers' Party (PKK) to set up training camps from 1980. The PKK was a militant Kurdish group led by Abdullah Öcalan that was waging an insurgency against Turkey. Syria and Turkey were hostile toward each other at the time, resulting in the use of the PKK as a proxy group. The party began to deeply influence the Syrian Kurdish population in the Afrin and Ayn al-Arab Districts, where it promoted Kurdish identity through music, clothing, popular culture, and social activities. In contrast, the PKK remained much less popular among Kurds in al-Hasakah Governorate, where other Kurdish parties maintained more influence. Many Syrian Kurds developed a long-lasting sympathy for the PKK, and a large number, possibly more than 10,000, joined its insurgency in Turkey. A rapprochement between Syria and Turkey brought an end to this phase in 1998, when Öcalan and the PKK were formally expelled from northern Syria. Regardless, the PKK maintained a clandestine presence in the region.

In 2002, the PKK and allied groups organized the Kurdistan Communities Union (KCK) to implement Öcalan's ideas in various Middle Eastern countries. A KCK branch was also set up in Syria, led by Sofi Nureddin and known as "KCK-Rojava". In an attempt to outwardly distance the Syrian branch from the PKK, the Democratic Union Party (PYD) was established as a de facto Syrian "successor" of the PKK in 2003. The "People's Defense Units" (YPG), a paramilitary wing of the PYD, was also founded during this time, but remained dormant.

=== Establishment of de facto autonomy and war against ISIL ===
2012 VOA report about Kurdish aspirations for autonomy in Syria

In 2011, a civil uprising erupted in Syria, prompting hasty government reforms. One of the issues addressed during this time was the status of Syria's stateless Kurds, as President Bashar al-Assad granted about 220,000 Kurds citizenship. In the course of the next few months, the crisis in Syria escalated into a civil war. The armed Syrian opposition seized control of several regions, while security forces were overstretched. In mid-2012, the government responded to this development by withdrawing its military from three mainly Kurdish areas and leaving control to local militias. This was described as an attempt by the Assad regime to keep the Kurdish population out of the initial civil uprising and civil war.

Map of the territory of the region over time
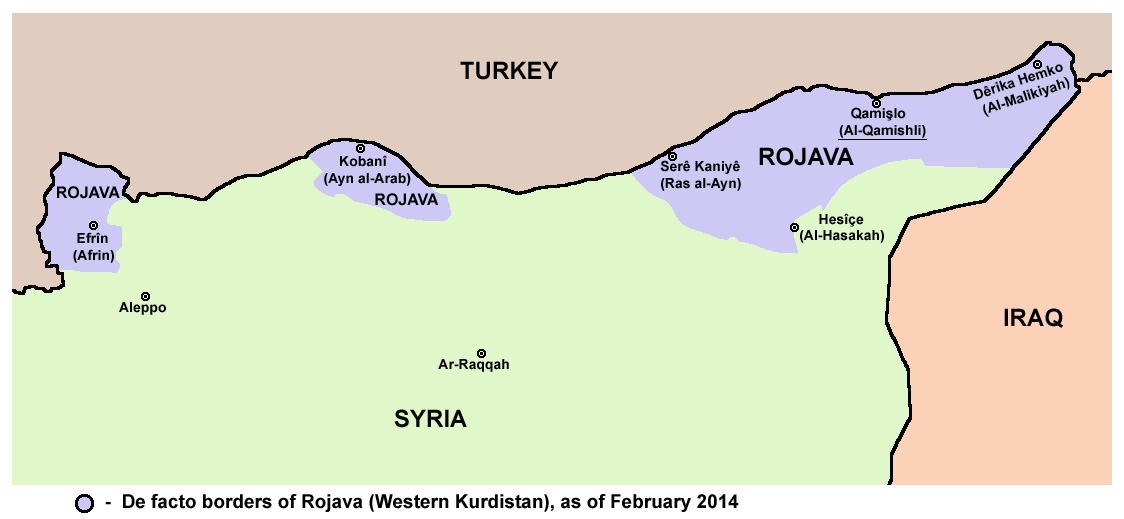
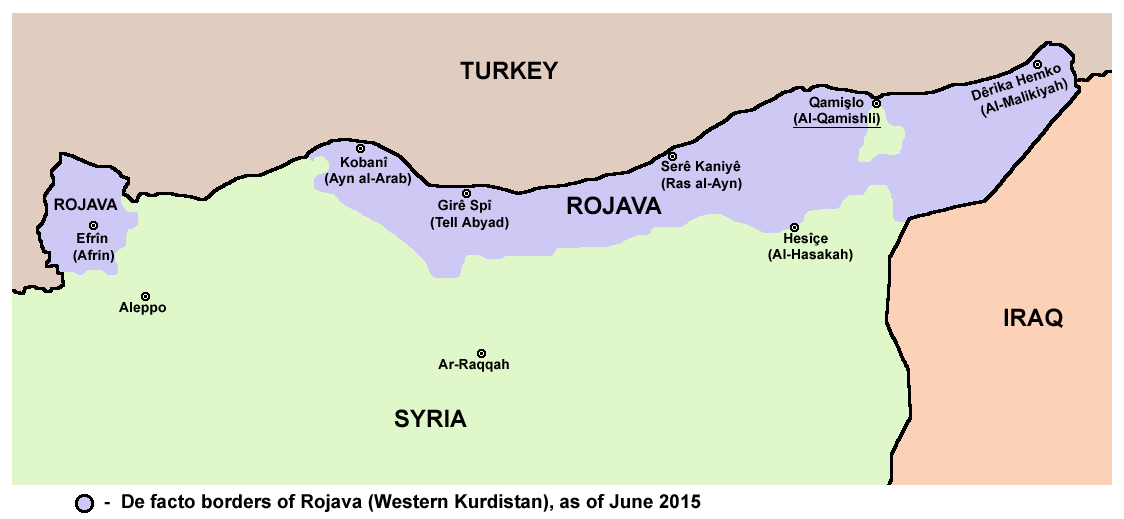
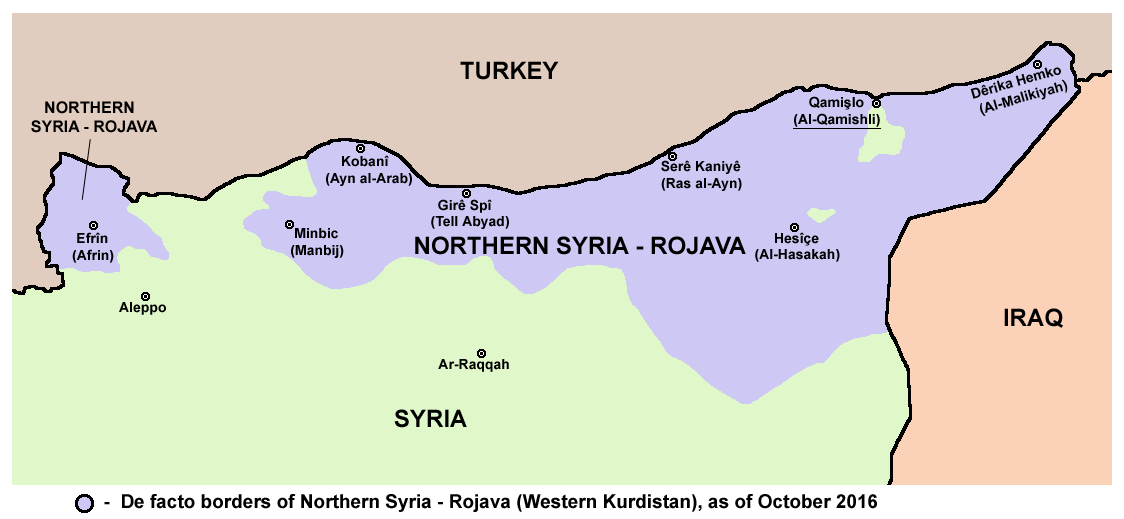
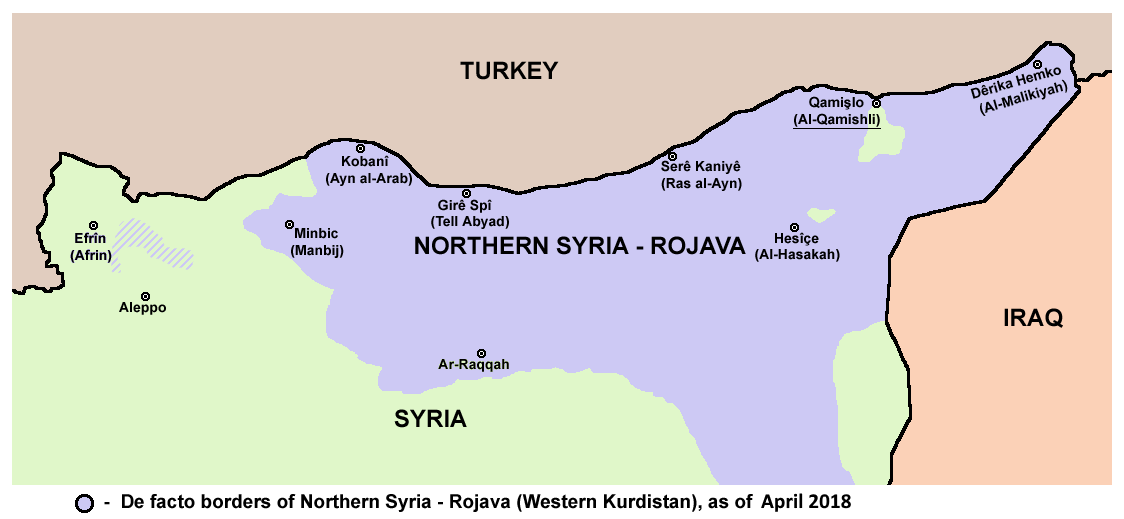
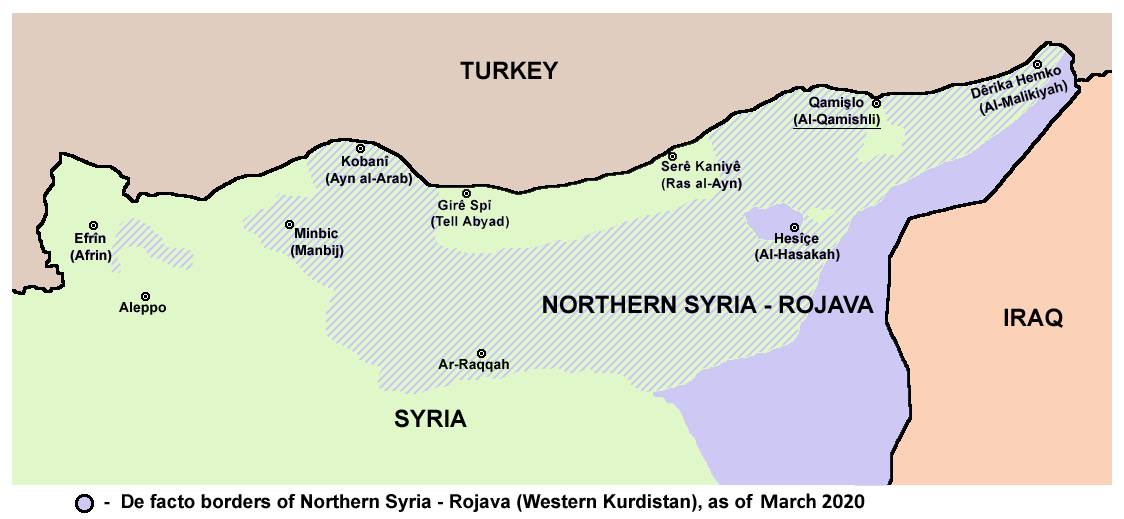
Map of the changing territory controlled by the region in February 2014, June 2015, October 2016, April 2018, and March 2020

Existing underground Kurdish political parties, namely the PYD and the Kurdish National Council (KNC), joined to form the Kurdish Supreme Committee (KSC). The People's Protection Units (YPG) militia was reestablished to defend Kurdish-inhabited areas in northern Syria. In July 2012, the YPG established control in the towns of Kobanî, Amuda and Afrin, and the Kurdish Supreme Committee established a joint leadership council to administer the towns. Soon, the YPG also gained control of the cities of Al-Malikiyah, Ras al-Ayn, al-Darbasiyah, and al-Muabbada and parts of Hasakah and Qamishli. Doing so, the YPG and its female wing, the Women's Protection Units (YPJ), mostly battled factions of the Free Syrian Army, and Islamist militias like the al-Nusra Front and Jabhat Ghuraba al-Sham. They also eclipsed rival Kurdish militias, and absorbed some government loyalist groups. According to researcher Charles R. Lister, the government's withdrawal and concurrent rise of the PYD "raised many eyebrows", as the relationship between the two entities was "highly contentious" at the time. The PYD was known to oppose certain government policies, but had also strongly criticised the Syrian opposition.

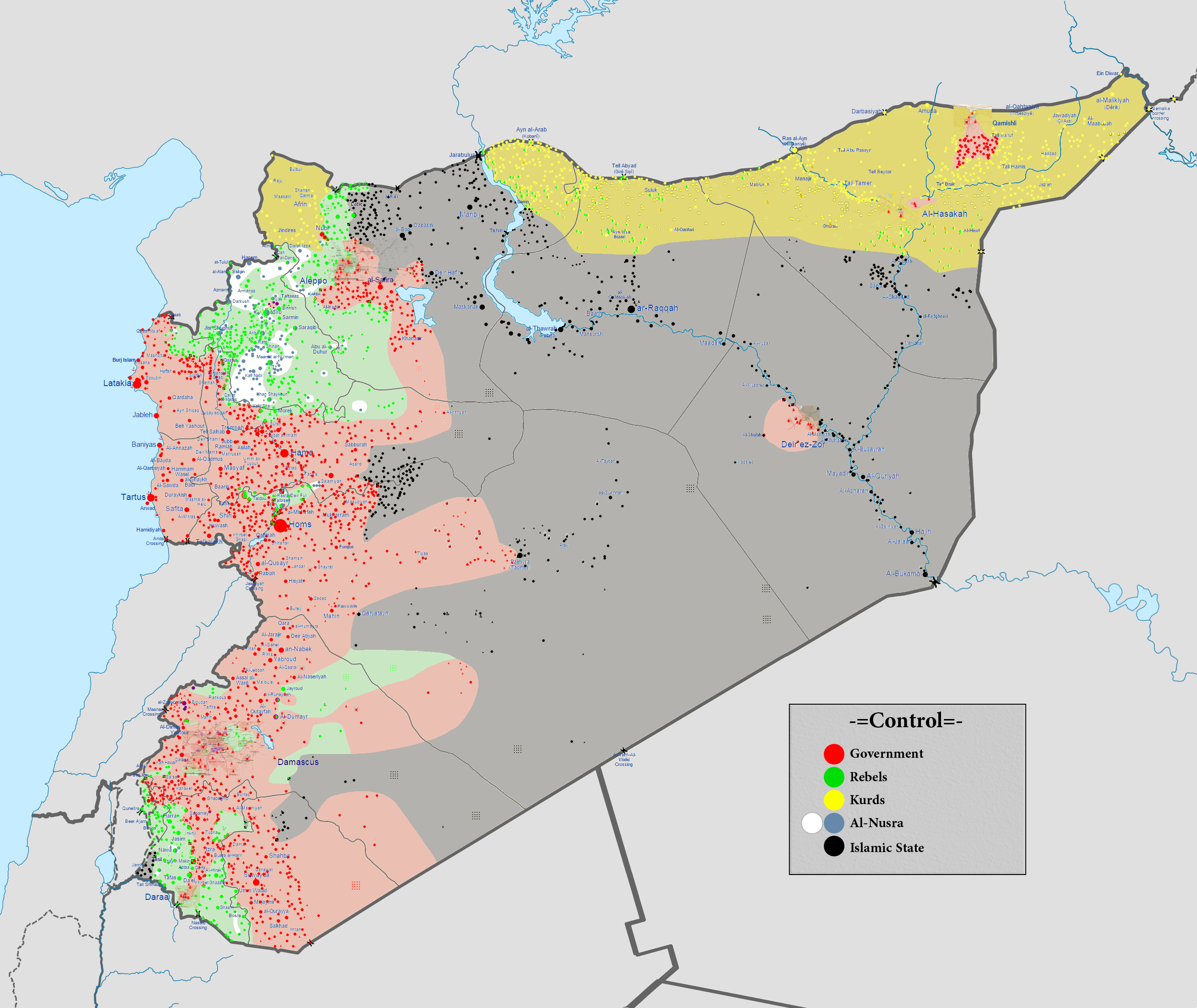
Military situation in December 2015, the SDF was successful in pushing ISIL out of northern Syria

Following a deadly PYD repression of opposition demonstrations in Amuda, the Kurdish National Council withdrew from the Kurdish Supreme Committee. Unopposed, the PYD's political coalition, Movement for a Democratic Society (TEV-DEM), controlled the Kurdish Supreme Committee until the latter was dissolved due to disputes between the two factions. On 19 July 2013, the PYD announced that it had written a constitution for an "autonomous Syrian Kurdish region", and planned to hold a referendum to approve the constitution in October 2013. Qamishli served as the first de facto capital of the PYD-led governing body, which was officially called the "Interim Transitional Administration". The announcement was widely denounced by both moderate and Islamist factions of the Syrian opposition. In January 2014, three areas declared their autonomy as cantons (later Afrin Region, Jazira Region and Euphrates Region) and an interim constitution (also known as social contract) was approved. The Syrian opposition and the Kurdish parties belonging to the KNC condemned this move, regarding the canton system as illegal, authoritarian, and supportive of the Syrian government. The PYD countered that the constitution was open to review and amendment, and that the KNC had been consulted on its drafting beforehand. From September 2014 to spring 2015, the YPG forces in Kobanî Canton, supported by some Free Syrian Army militias and leftist international and Kurdistan Workers' Party (PKK) volunteers, fought and finally repelled an assault by the Islamic State of Iraq and the Levant (ISIL) during the Siege of Kobanî, and in the YPG's Tell Abyad offensive of summer 2015, the regions of Jazira and Kobanî were connected.

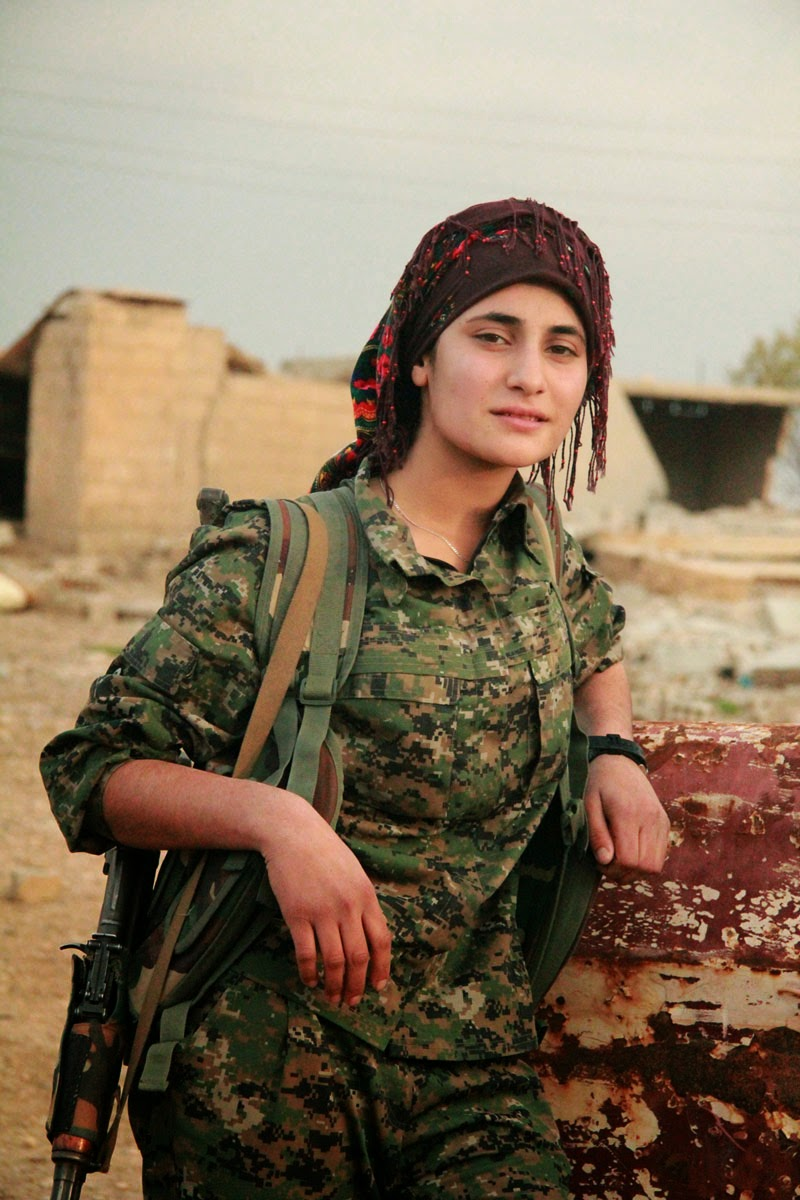
A YPJ fighter, November 2014

After the YPG victory over ISIL in Kobanî in March 2015, an alliance between the YPG and the United States was formed, which greatly worried Turkey, because Turkey stated that the YPG was a clone of the PKK, which Turkey (and the U.S. and the E.U.) designated as terrorists. In December 2015, the Syrian Democratic Council was created. On 17 March 2016, at a TEV-DEM-organized conference in Rmelan, the establishment of the Democratic Federation of Rojava – Northern Syria was declared in the areas they controlled in Northern Syria. The declaration was quickly denounced by both the Syrian government and the National Coalition of Syrian Revolutionary and Opposition Forces.

In March 2016, Hediya Yousef and Mansur Selum were elected co-chairpersons for the executive committee to organise a constitution for the region, to replace the 2014 constitution. Yousef said the decision to set up a federal government was in large part driven by the expansion of territories captured from Islamic State: "Now, after the liberation of many areas, it requires us to go to a wider and more comprehensive system that can embrace all the developments in the area, that will also give rights to all the groups to represent themselves and to form their own administrations". In July 2016, a draft for the new constitution was presented, based on the principles of the 2014 constitution, mentioning all ethnic groups living in Northern Syria and addressing their cultural, political and linguistic rights. The main political opposition to the constitution were Kurdish nationalists, in particular the KNC, who had different ideological aspirations from the TEV-DEM coalition. On 28 December 2016, after a meeting of the 151-member Syrian Democratic Council in Rmelan, a new constitution was resolved; despite objections by 12 Kurdish parties, the region was renamed the "Democratic Federation of Northern Syria", removing the name "Rojava".

=== Turkish military operations and occupation ===
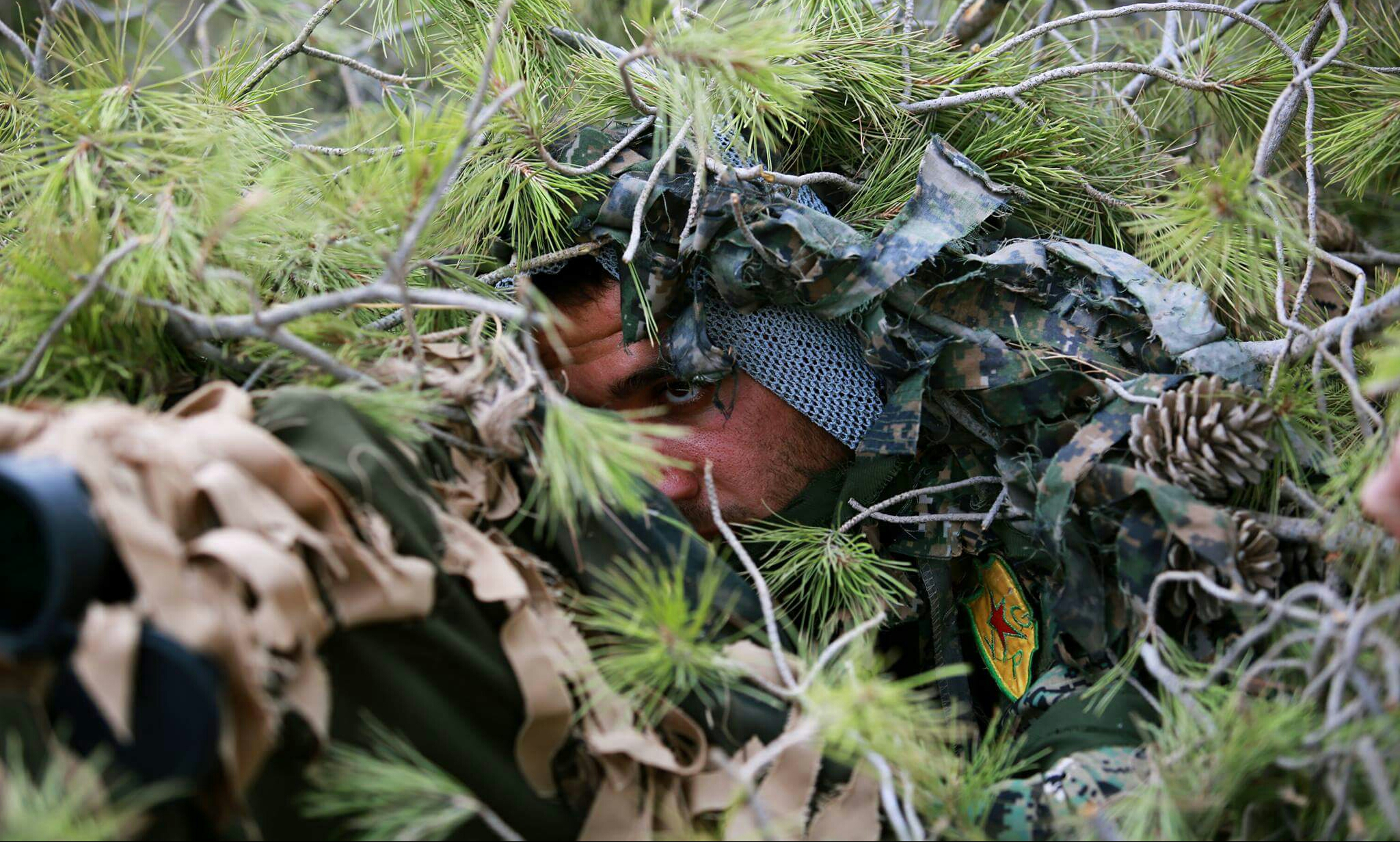
A YPG sniper in defense of Northern Syria from Turkey, Afrin

Since 2012, when the first YPG pockets appeared, Turkey had been alarmed by the presence of PKK-related forces at its southern border and had grown concerned when the YPG entered into an alliance with the US to oppose ISIS forces in the region. The Turkish government had refused to allow aid to be sent to the YPG during the Siege of Kobanî. This had led to the Kurdish riots, the breakdown of the 2013–2015 peace process in July 2015, and the renewal of armed conflict between the PKK and Turkish forces. According to the Turkish pro-government newspaper Daily Sabah, the YPG's parent organisation, the PYD, had provided the PKK with militants, explosives, arms and ammunition.

In August 2016, Turkey launched Operation Euphrates Shield to prevent the YPG-led Syrian Democratic Forces (SDF) from linking Afrin Canton (now Afrin Region) with the rest of Rojava and to capture Manbij from the SDF. Turkish and Turkish-backed Syrian rebel forces prevented the linking of Rojava's cantons and captured all settlements in Jarabulus previously under SDF control. The SDF handed over part of the region to the Syrian government to act as a buffer zone against Turkey. Manbij remained under SDF control.

In early 2018, Turkey launched Operation Olive Branch alongside the Turkish-backed Syrian National Army to capture the Kurdish-majority Afrin and oust the YPG/SDF from the region. Afrin Canton, a subdivision of the region, was occupied and over 100,000 civilians were displaced and relocated to Afrin Region's Shahba Canton, which remained under SDF, then joint SDF-Syrian Arab Army (SAA) control. The remaining SDF forces later launched an ongoing insurgency against the Turkish and Turkish-backed Syrian rebel forces.

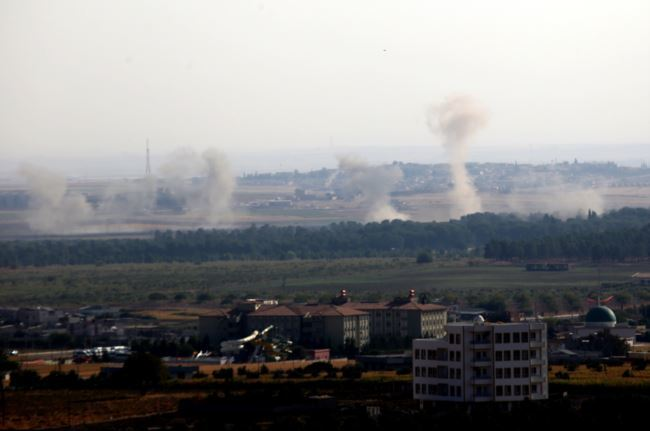
Ras al-Ayn shelling during the 2019 Turkish offensive into north-eastern Syria

In 2019, Turkey launched Operation Peace Spring against the SDF. On 9 October, the Turkish Air Force launched airstrikes on border towns. On 6 October, President of the United States Donald Trump had ordered United States troops to withdraw from northeastern Syria, where they had been providing support to the SDF. Journalists called the withdrawal "a serious betrayal to the Kurds" and "a catastrophic blow to US credibility as an ally and Washington's standing on the world stage"; one journalist stated that "this was one of the worst US foreign policy disasters since the Iraq War". Turkish and Turkish-backed Syrian rebel forces captured 68 settlements, including Ras al-Ayn, Tell Abyad, Suluk, Mabrouka and Manajir during the 9-day operation before a 120-hour ceasefire was announced. The operation was condemned by the international community, and human rights violations by Turkish forces were reported. Media outlets labelled the attack "no surprise" because Turkish president Recep Tayyip Erdoğan had for months warned that the presence of the YPG on the Turkish-Syrian border despite the Northern Syria Buffer Zone was unacceptable. An unintended consequence of the attack was that it raised the worldwide popularity and legitimacy of the northeastern Syrian administration, and several PYD and YPG representatives became internationally known to an unprecedented degree. However, these events caused tensions within the KCK, as differences emerged between the PKK and PYD leadership. The PYD was determined to maintain the regional autonomy and hoped for a continued alliance with the United States. In contrast, the PKK central command was now willing to restart negotiations with Turkey, distrusted the United States, and emphasized the international success of its leftist ideology over the survival of Rojava as administrative entity.

=== Post-Assad conflict and integration ===
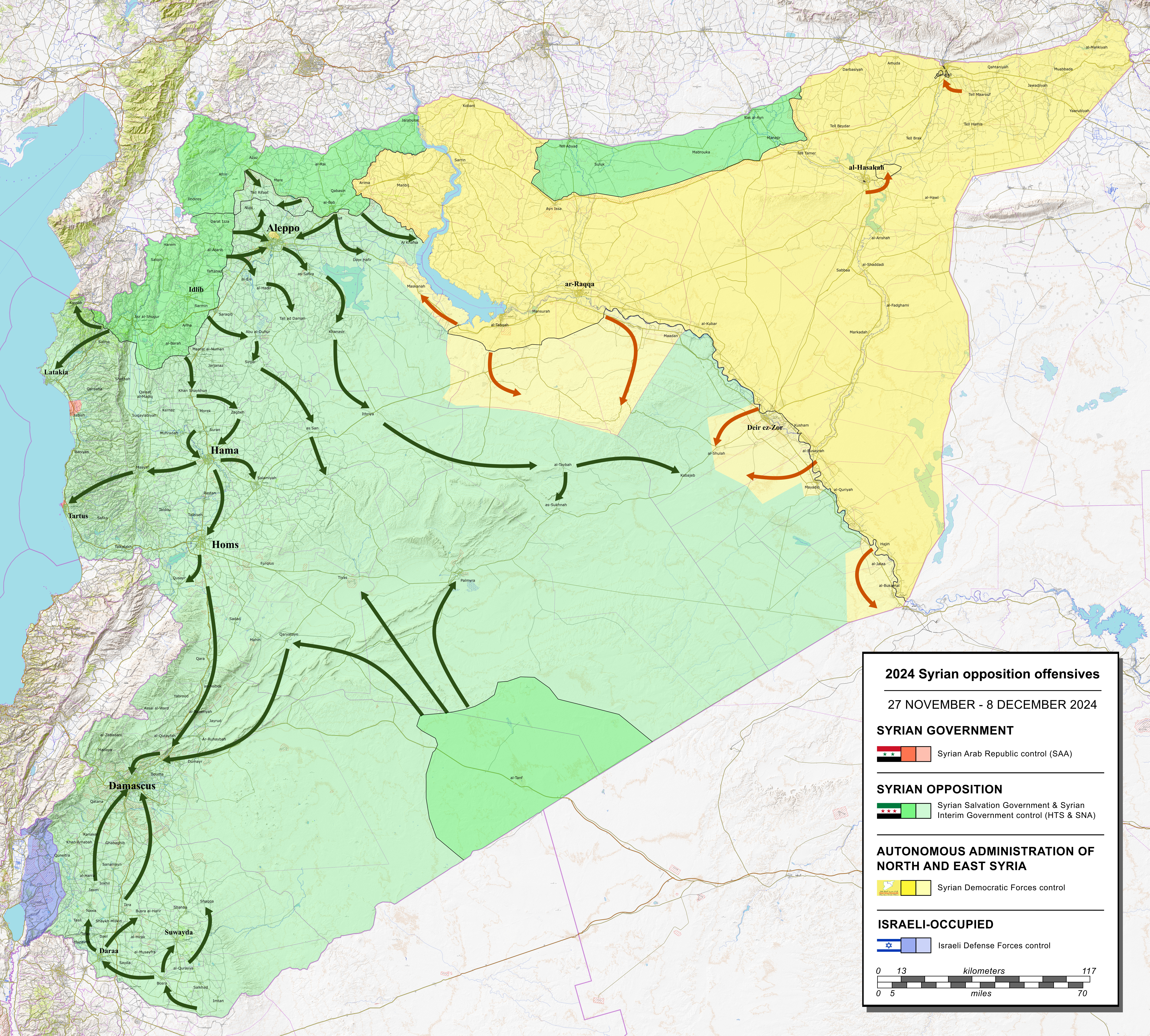
Geopolitical changes during the opposition offensives, rebels in green and DAANES in yellow

Syrian president Ahmed al-Sharaa announced the 14-point agreement on the ceasefire and the integration of the Syrian Democratic Forces (SDF), which was signed by SDF Commander-in-Chief Mazloum Abdi. (Note: Abdi put an electronic signature to the deal.)

During the November 2024 Syrian opposition offensives, which toppled the Assad regime, the SDF captured the southeastern city of Deir ez-Zor. SDF forces subsequently withdrew from Deir ez-Zor following protests by the local population, and the city was swiftly occupied by Tahrir al-Sham. On 12 December, DAANES announced that it had adopted the flag of the Syrian revolution as the official flag of Syria.

Despite the collapse of the Assad regime, Turkey and Turkish-backed SNA fighters in northern Syria launched an offensive against SDF forces. On 9 December, SNA fighters captured the city of Manbij. The Turkish/SNA offensive continued with the 2024 Kobani clashes, which ended in a victory for the SDF. This followed a US-mediated truce and an SNA failure to capture Tishrin Dam and Qara-Qowzak Bridge. This was followed by a counter-offensive in the East Aleppo offensive (2024–2025). The 10 March agreement ceasefire was brokered by the International Coalition, keeping the disputed dams under SDF control until the agreement expired on 1 January 2026.

During the Aleppo clashes, the SDF and the Syrian Army clashed over the SDF and DAANES's control over the Kurdish-majority Sheikh Maqsood and Ashrafiyah neighborhoods of Aleppo. The status quo was maintained following an initial ceasefire on 7 October 2025. Despite these clashes, on 18 December 2025, the United Nations issued a report that the SDF and DAANES should agree on a roadmap for integration into the new Syrian government. Talks were agreed to; however, negotiations with the new government quickly stalled due to DAANES criticism of the interim government's inclusivity. By 25 December, the Syrian government had announced that it was suspending all communications with the SDF and DAANES.

On 3 January 2026, Maryam Ibrahim, a spokesman for the DAANES Negotiation Committee, stated that although relations remained "a bit weak", both sides were prioritizing military integration, and that there would be a finalized time frame for such integration "in the coming days." However, on 6 January, the Syrian government announced that SDF forces had opened fire on its troops in Aleppo, resulting in the death of one government soldier. On 7 January, there was a large-scale combined-arms assault against the enclave. On 8 January, there was an infiltration attempt. On 9 January, SDF forces in Sheikh Maqsood agreed to a government ceasefire, under which SDF fighters and civilians who wished to accompany them were bussed out of the enclave to the DAANES. A final government assault took place on 10 January, with five Asayish operatives performing a suicide bombing against advancing government forces. By the end of the day, the enclave was in government hands, with the remaining SDF forces surrendering.

The newly reorganized Syrian Army expanded its operation on 13 January, launching a major offensive against the DAANES' holdings in Raqqa and Deir ez-Zor Governorates. The new army attacked civilians and civilian infrastructure, carried out extrajudicial killings, tortured SDF fighters and civilians, and physically abused and verbally threatened women; the SDF also killed civilians and an SDF fighter carried out extrajudicial killings. During the new government offensive, the Arab Tribal and Clan Forces waged a guerrilla war against the SDF in Deir ez-Zor, securing strategic oil fields. Arab SDF units in predominantly Arab cities such as Raqqa defected en masse. A 14-point ceasefire agreement with the SDF, negotiated through the US envoy Tom Barrack, was announced on 18 January, under which the SDF was set to be integrated into the Syrian government, while the governorates of Raqqa and Deir ez-Zor were immediately handed over to the government. Although some media outlets initially reported that the DAANES had collapsed, it became clear that the DAANES still existed and remained as a de facto administration in Al-Hasakah Governorate. Additionally, the ceasefire outlined the administration of prisoner-of-war camps for Islamic State members, all border crossings, and oil fields.

On 3 August 2026, Hasakah Governor Noureddin Issa Ahmed stated that the integration of the DAANES into the Syrian system was 70 percent complete, including "education, health care, agriculture and culture", whereas the "final step", the complete dissolution of the SDF and DAANES, was not yet possible. However, four SDF brigades had already been integrated into the Syrian Armed Forces. According to Jihan Said Hassam, director of the Qamishli Subdistrict, the dissolution of the SDF was imminent.

On 25 August, SDF Commander-in-Chief Mazloum Abdi, YPJ commander Newroz Ahmed, and co-president of the DAANES Executive Council, Îlham Ehmed, travelled to Damascus for a day of discussions. Following the discussions, Abdi gave a press conference in which he declared the integration of the SDF into the Syrian state and its formal dissolution, describing the moment as "historic". Abdi was quoted as saying, "the country has entered a new phase, one of peace and participation in building a new Syria", and characterized the new political stage as going "from the battlefields to the fields of reconstruction, from the era of weapons to the era of peace, and from the stage of defending Syria to the stage of building Syria." He emphasized that the next stage would prioritize Kurdish language and educational rights, claiming that al-Sharaa had pledged to "safeguard the right to Kurdish language education". This fell short of the expectations and desires of many Syrian Kurds, who argued for constitutional recognition and protection of citizenship and language rights. Alongside SDF military integration, there had been progress in economic and political integration, with, among other steps, state employees having been placed on the payroll of Damascus and the appointment of local governors having been completed.

== Government and politics ==
Location in the Syrian civil war, prior to the late 2024 offensives

Supporters of the region's administration stated that it was an officially secular polity, with direct democratic ambitions based on democratic confederalism and libertarian socialism, promoted decentralization, gender equality, environmental sustainability, social ecology, and pluralistic tolerance for religious, cultural, and political diversity, and stated that these values were mirrored in its constitution, society, and politics, presenting it as a model for a federalized Syria as a whole rather than outright independence. (Note: Sources:) The region's administration was also accused by partisan and non-partisan sources of authoritarianism, media censorship, forced disappearances, support of the Ba'athist regime, (Note: Sources:) Kurdification, (Note: Sources:) and displacement. At the same time, DAANES was also described by partisan and non-partisan sources as the most democratic system in Syria, with direct open elections, social equality, respect for human rights within the region, as well as the defense of minority and religious rights within Syria. (Note: Sources:)

DAANES had widespread support among western leftists and feminists for its universal democratic, sustainable, autonomous, pluralist, equal, and feminist policies in dialogues with other parties and organizations.

The political system of the region was based on its adopted constitution, officially titled "Charter of the Social Contract". The first version of the constitution was ratified on 9 January 2014 and provided that all residents of the region would enjoy fundamental rights such as gender equality and freedom of religion. It also provided for property rights. The region's system of community government had direct democratic aspirations.

The former diplomat Carne Ross observed in September 2015 in The New York Times:

For a former diplomat like me, I found it confusing: I kept looking for a hierarchy, the singular leader, or signs of a government line, when, in fact, there was none; there were just groups. There was none of that stifling obedience to the party, or the obsequious deference to the "big man"—a form of government all too evident just across the borders, in Turkey to the north, and the Kurdish regional government of Iraq to the south. The confident assertiveness of young people was striking.

In 2016, a Chatham House research paper stated that power was heavily centralized in the hands of the Democratic Union Party (PYD). Abdullah Öcalan, a Kurdistan Workers' Party (PKK) leader imprisoned in İmralı, Turkey, became an iconic figure in the region whose ideology of democratic confederalism shaped the region's society and politics.

Besides the parties represented in TEV-DEM and the KNC, several other political groups operated in northern Syria. Several of these, such as the Kurdish National Alliance in Syria, the Democratic Conservative Party, the Assyrian Democratic Party, and others actively participated in governing the region.

The politics of the region was described as having "libertarian transnational aspirations" influenced by the PKK's shift toward anarchism, but also included various "tribal, ethno-sectarian, capitalist and patriarchal structures". The region had a "co-governance" policy in which each position at each level of government in the region included a "female equivalent of equal authority" to a male. Similarly, there were aspirations for equal political representation of all ethno-religious components – Arabs, Kurds and Assyrians being the most sizeable ones. This was compared to the Lebanese confessionalist system, which was based on that country's major religions.

The PYD-led rule triggered protests in various areas since it first captured territory. In 2019, residents of tens of villages in the eastern Deir ez-Zor Governorate demonstrated for two weeks, regarding the new regional leadership as Kurdish-dominated and non-inclusive, citing arrests of suspected ISIL members, looting of oil, lack of infrastructure, as well as forced conscription into the SDF as reasons. The protests resulted in deaths and injuries. In 2016, researcher Kheder Khaddour stated that leaders of local councils in Raqqa Governorate had been chosen by the SDF in a top-down way, and that the vetting process for identifying ISIL members placed obstacles for the return of refugees. He stated that there was dissent about the new structures as well as a lack of trust between the SDF and some demographic components of the local population.

Qamishli initially served as the de facto capital of the administration, but the area's governing body later relocated to Ayn Issa.

=== Separation of powers ===
During the period between 2018 and 2019, separation of powers in the political structure included three major components: the Syrian Democratic Council as a representative body of political parties and organisations; the AANES itself; and TEV-DEM as a representative body of trade unions and civil society associations. The AANES itself was approximately structured according to the Montesquieu model, with the Executive Council having executive oversight responsibilities through offices and commissions; the General Council coordinating legislation and aiming to promote legal unification between regions; and the Justice Council aiming to coordinate the justice systems of the regions.

In the 2023 constitution, the People's Council had legislative power under Article 92, and the Law Council "develops laws and regulations based on ethics and democratic principles of rights" under Article 103.

Communes were intended to be the core political bodies, with a succession of higher-level (neighbourhood, sub-district, district, canton, and region) councils. Decisions were expected to be made according to the subsidiarity principle – at the most local level appropriate for the decision. Under the 2018–2019 structure, councils and committees had a gender quota requiring minimum representation of 40% women and 40% men.

=== Syrian Democratic Council ===
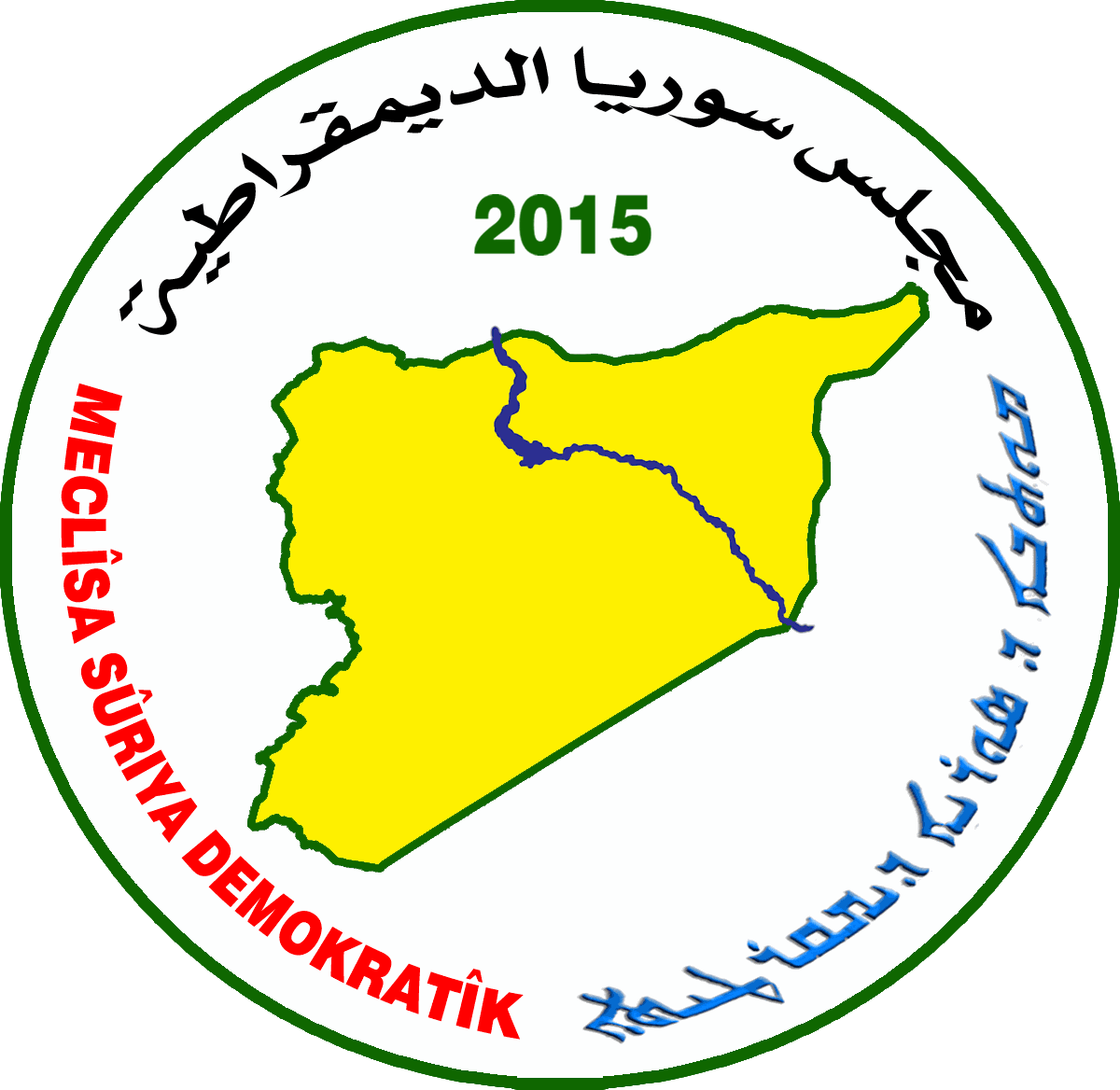
Seal of the Syrian Democratic Council

In December 2015, during a meeting of the region's representatives in Al-Malikiyah, the Syrian Democratic Council (SDC) was established to serve as the political representative of the Syrian Democratic Forces. The co-leaders selected to lead the SDC at its founding were prominent human rights activist Haytham Manna and TEV-DEM Executive Board member Îlham Ehmed.

=== Elections ===
==== Method ====
Under the 2023 Constitution of AANES, three-fifths of municipal representatives were elected by the general population, while two-fifths were representatives chosen by demographic components. The AANES-level Democratic Council of People of North and East Syria was required to have fifty percent women.

The municipal governing bodies were referred to as city councils, town councils and, for the smallest units, communes. As of July 2025, there were 36 city councils, 152 town councils, and 3,950 communes.

==== Commune and council elections ====
General elections were planned for 2014 and 2018, but were postponed due to fighting.

Local elections were held in March 2015.

Commune elections were held on 22 September 2017. A total of 12,421 candidates competed for around 3,700 communal positions during the elections, which were organized by the High Electoral Commission.

Elections for the city and town councils of the Jazira Region, Euphrates Region, and Afrin Region were held in December 2017. Most of the Afrin Region was occupied by Turkish-led forces in early 2018, though the administrative division continued to operate from Tell Rifaat under joint YPG-Syrian Army control.

The planned 2024 elections were repeatedly postponed and ultimately not held. They were intended to be the last elections in the DAANES before its integration into the Syrian state on 20 August 2026.

=== Administrative divisions ===
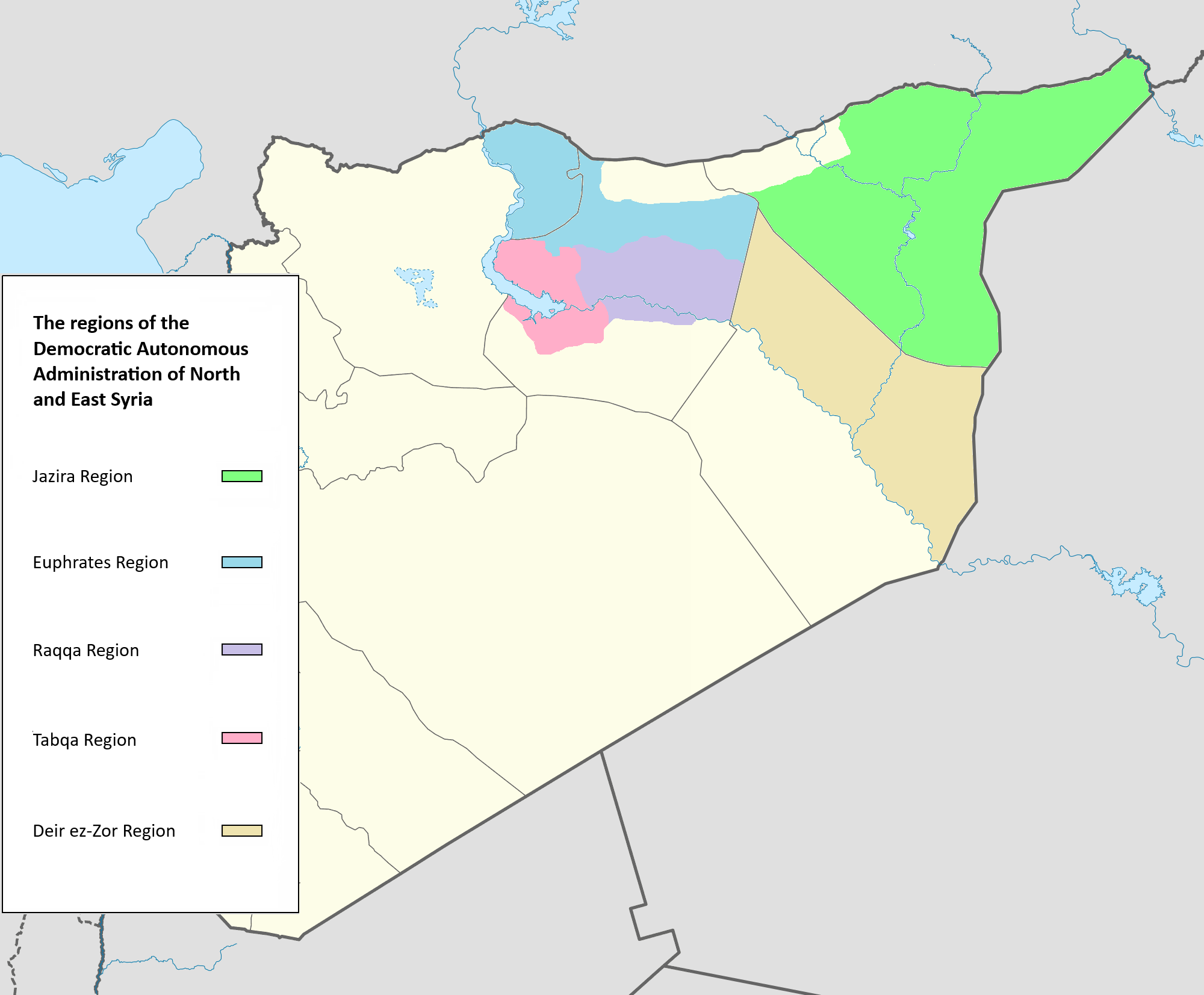
Regions of the Democratic Autonomous Administration of North and East Syria (2024–2026)

The polity was initially organised in the form of cantons, with Article 8 of the 2014 Constitution stating that "All Cantons [...] are founded on the principle of local self-government. Cantons may freely elect their representatives and representative bodies, and may pursue their rights insofar as it does not contravene the articles of the Charter."

The cantons were later reorganized into regions with subordinate cantons/provinces, areas, districts, and communes. On 6 September 2018, during a meeting of the Syrian Democratic Council in Ayn Issa, a new name for the polity was adopted, the "Autonomous Administration of North and East Syria", encompassing the Euphrates, Afrin, and Jazira regions, as well as the local civil councils in the regions of Raqqa, Manbij, Tabqa, and Deir ez-Zor. During the meeting, a 70-member "General Council for the Autonomous Administration of North and East Syria" was formed.

The SDF withdrew from the Afrin region in 2018, from the Manbij region in 2024, and from the Deir ez-Zor, Raqqa, and Tabqa regions in 2026, as well as partially from the Jazira and Euphrates regions as a result of the 2026 northeastern Syria offensive.

Regions	Official name (languages)
Jazira Region	إقليم الجزيرة (Arabic); Herêma Cizîrê (Kurdish); ܦܢܝܬܐ ܕܓܙܪܬܐ (Classical Syriac)
Euphrates Region	إقليم الفرات (Arabic); Herêma Firatê (Kurdish); ܦܢܝܬܐ ܕܦܪܬ (Classical Syriac)
Afrin Region	إقليم عفرين (Arabic); Herêma Efrînê (Kurdish); ܦܢܝܬܐ ܕܥܦܪܝܢ (Classical Syriac)
Raqqa Region	إقليم الرقة (Arabic); Herêma Reqayê (Kurdish); ܦܢܝܬܐ ܕܪܩܗ (Classical Syriac)
Taqba Region	إقليم الطبقة (Arabic); Herêma Tebqayê (Kurdish); ܦܢܝܬܐ ܕܛܒܩܗ (Classical Syriac)
Manbij Region	إقليم منبج (Arabic); Herêma Minbicê (Kurdish); ܦܢܝܬܐ ܕܡܒܘܓ (Classical Syriac)
Deir ez-Zor Region	إقليم دير الزور (Arabic); Herêma Dêra Zorê (Kurdish); ܦܢܝܬܐ ܕܕܝܪ ܐܠ ܙܘܪ (Classical Syriac)

=== Relations with the Syrian governments ===
Agreement stipulating the integration of the Syrian Democratic Forces (SDF) into the institutions of the Syrian state, 10 March 2025

The region did not state that it pursued full independence but rather autonomy within a federal and democratic Syria.

Flag of Syrian Democratic Forces, military wing of the DAANES

The relations of the region with the Ba'athist government were determined within the context of the Syrian civil war. The 2012 constitution of Syria and the Constitution of the Democratic Autonomous Administration of North and East Syria were legally incompatible with respect to legislative and executive authority. In the military realm, combat between the People's Defense Units (YPG) and Syrian government forces was rare; in most instances, some of the territory still controlled by the Syrian government in Qamishli and al-Hasakah was lost to the YPG. In some military campaigns, particularly in northern Aleppo governorate and in al-Hasakah, YPG and Syrian government forces tacitly cooperated against Islamist forces, the Islamic State of Iraq and the Levant (ISIL), and others.

In March 2015, the Syrian Information Minister announced that his government considered recognizing Kurdish autonomy "within the law and constitution". While the region's administration was not invited to the Geneva III peace talks on Syria, or any of the earlier talks, Russia in particular called for the region's inclusion and to some degree carried the region's positions into the talks, as documented in Russia's May 2016 draft for a new constitution for Syria. In October 2016, there were reports of a Russian initiative for federalization with a focus on northern Syria, which at its core called for turning the existing institutions of the region into legitimate institutions of Syria; it was also reported that the Syrian government rejected it at the time. The Damascus ruling elite was split over the question of whether the new model in the region could work in parallel and converge with the Syrian government, for the benefit of both, or whether the agenda should be to centralize again all power at the end of the civil war, necessitating preparation for an ultimate confrontation with the region's institutions.

An analysis released in June 2017 described the region's "relationship with the regime" as fraught but functional and as having a "semi-cooperative dynamic". In late September 2017, Syria's Foreign Minister said that Damascus would consider granting Kurds more autonomy in the region once ISIL was defeated.

On 13 October 2019, the SDF announced that it had reached an agreement with the Syrian Army which allowed the latter to enter the SDF-held cities of Manbij and Kobani in order to dissuade a Turkish attack on those cities as part of the cross-border offensive by Turkish and Turkish-backed Syrian rebels. The Syrian Army also deployed in the north of Syria together with the SDF along the Syrian-Turkish border and entered several SDF-held cities such as Ayn Issa and Tell Tamer. Following the creation of the Second Northern Syria Buffer Zone, the SDF stated that it was ready to merge with the Syrian Army if or when a political settlement between the Syrian government and the SDF was achieved.

With the 2024 fall of the Assad regime, the autonomous administration was initially in an uncertain position between the ascendant rebel government and the Turkish government, which had been amicable and hostile towards the administration, respectively. On 10 March 2025, an agreement was signed to integrate the SDF into the structures of the transitional government. However, tensions resurfaced during a subsequent government offensive in northeastern Syria, prompting negotiations that culminated in a 14-point ceasefire and integration agreement announced on 18 January 2026. The agreement was finalized by 30 January, ending the fighting and providing for the withdrawal of forces, the entry of government troops into key Kurdish-held cities, the integration of SDF forces into state institutions, recognition of Kurdish civil rights, and the return of displaced persons.

=== External relations ===
==== Kurdish issues ====
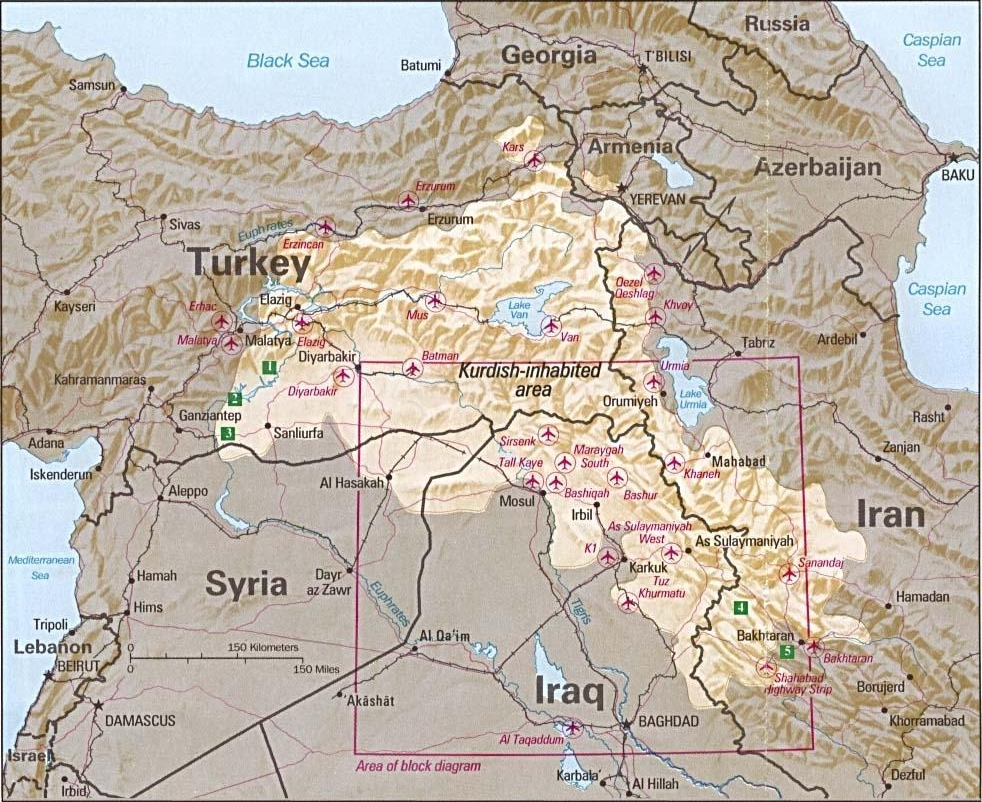
Kurdish-inhabited areas in 1992 according to the CIA

The region's dominant political party, the Democratic Union Party (PYD), was a member organisation of the Kurdistan Communities Union (KCK) organization; however, the other KCK member organisations in the neighbouring states (Turkey, Iran and Iraq) with Kurdish minorities were either outlawed (Turkish Kurdistan, Iranian Kurdistan) or politically marginal with respect to other Kurdish parties (Iraq). Expressions of sympathy for Syrian Kurds were numerous among Kurds in Turkey. During the Siege of Kobanî, some ethnic Kurdish citizens of Turkey crossed the border and volunteered in the defense of the town.

The region's relationship with the Kurdistan Regional Government in Iraq was complicated. One context was that the governing party there, the Kurdistan Democratic Party (KDP), viewed itself and its affiliated Kurdish parties in other countries as a more conservative and nationalist alternative and competitor to the KCK political agenda and blueprint in general. The political system of Iraqi Kurdistan stood in stark contrast to the region's system. Like the KCK umbrella organization, the PYD had some anti-nationalist ideological leanings while having Kurdish nationalist factions as well. They had traditionally been opposed by the Iraqi-Kurdish KDP-sponsored Kurdish National Council in Syria, which had more clearly defined Kurdish nationalist leanings.

==== International relations ====
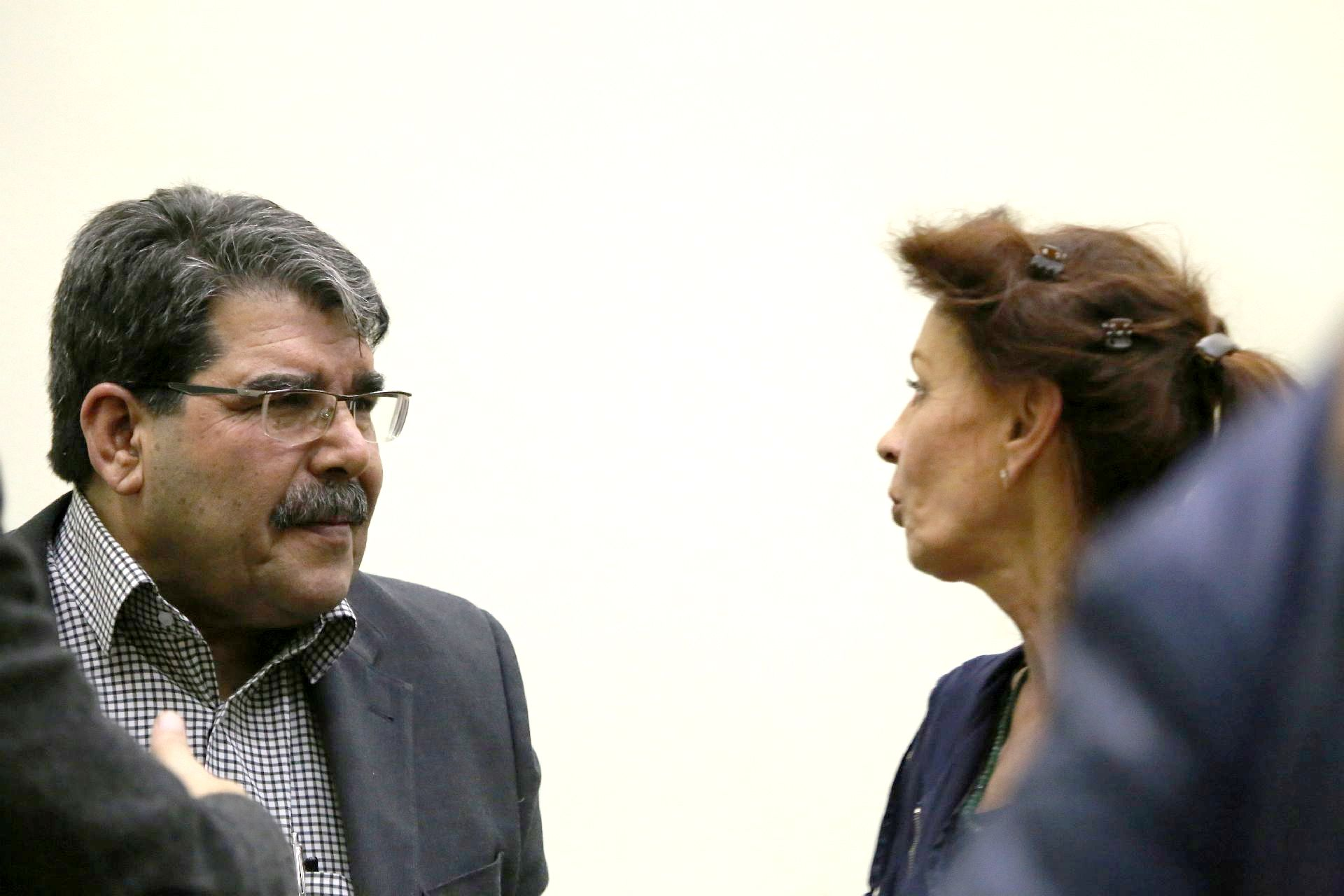
Salih Muslim, co-chairman of the region's leading Democratic Union Party (PYD) with Ulla Jelpke at Rosa Luxemburg Foundation in Berlin

Aside from the representation offices DAANES had established in France, Sweden, Germany and Switzerland, the region's role in the international arena included comprehensive military cooperation between its militias, under the Syrian Democratic Forces (SDF) umbrella, and the United States and the international (US-led) coalition against the Islamic State of Iraq and the Levant. In a public statement in March 2016, the day after the declaration of the regions autonomy, U.S. Defense Secretary Ashton Carter praised the People's Protection Units (YPG) militia as having "proven to be excellent partners of ours on the ground in fighting ISIL. We are grateful for that, and we intend to continue to do that, recognizing the complexities of their regional role." Late October 2016, U.S. Army Lt. Gen. Stephen Townsend, the commander of the international Anti-ISIL-coalition, said that the SDF would lead the impending assault on Raqqa, ISIL's stronghold and capital, and that SDF commanders would plan the operation with advice from American and coalition troops. At various times, the U.S. deployed U.S. troops embedded with the SDF to the border between the region and Turkey, in order to deter Turkish aggressions against the SDF. In February 2018, the United States Department of Defense released a budget blueprint for 2019 with respect to the region, which included $300 million for the Syrian Democratic Forces (SDF) and $250 million for border security. In April 2018, the president of France, Emmanuel Macron dispatched troops to Manbij and Rmelan in a bid to assist Syrian Democratic Forces (SDF) militias and in order to defuse tensions with Turkey.

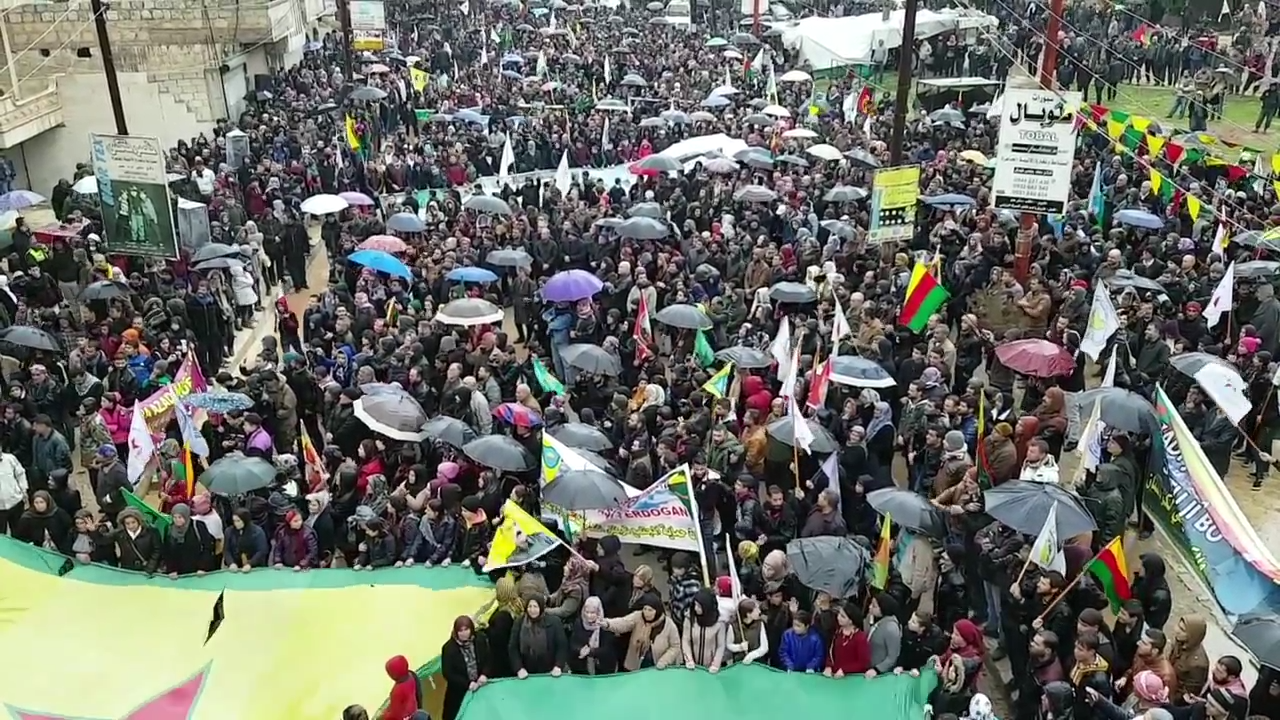
A demonstration in the city of Afrin in support of the YPG against the Turkish invasion of Afrin, 19 January 2018

In the diplomatic field, the de facto autonomous region lacked any formal recognition. While there was comprehensive activity involving the reception of the region's representatives and appreciation from a broad range of countries, only Russia occasionally openly supported the region's political ambition of federalization of Syria in the international arena, while the U.S. did not. After peace talks between Syrian civil war parties in Astana in January 2017, Russia offered a draft for a future constitution of Syria, which would, among other things, change the "Syrian Arab Republic" into the "Republic of Syria", introduce decentralized authorities as well as elements of federalism like "association areas", strengthen the parliament at the cost of the presidency, and realize secularism by abolishing Islamic jurisprudence as a source of legislation. The region opened official representation offices in Moscow during 2016, Stockholm, Berlin, Paris, and The Hague. A broad range of public voices in the U.S. and Europe called for more formal recognition of the region. International cooperation was in the field of educational and cultural institutions, such as the cooperation agreement of Paris 8 University with the newly founded University of Rojava in Qamishli, or plans for a French cultural centre in Amuda.

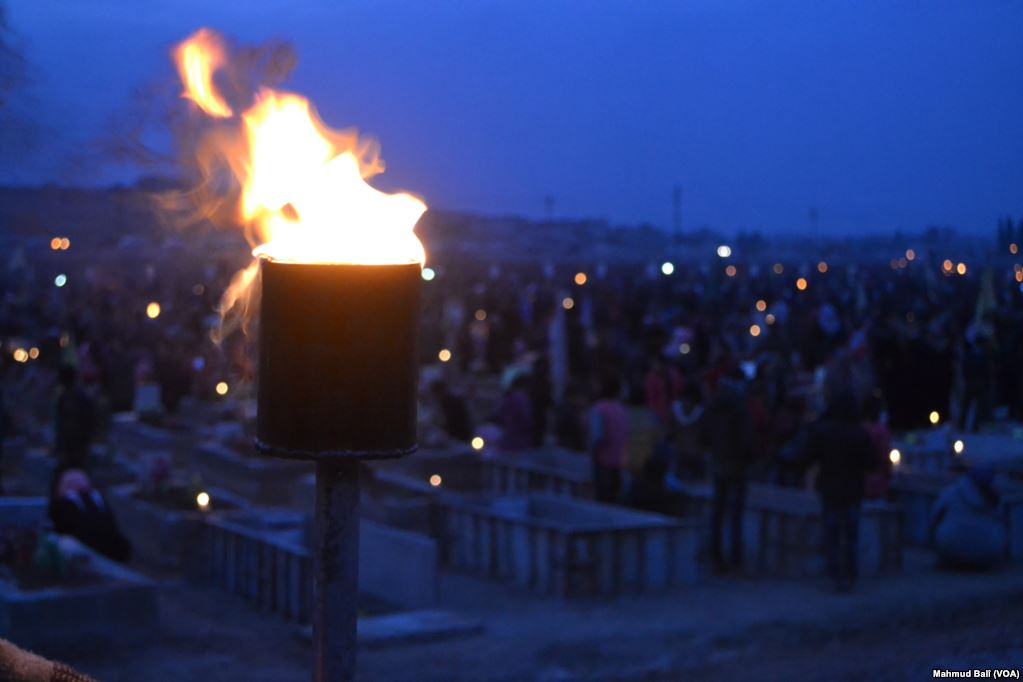
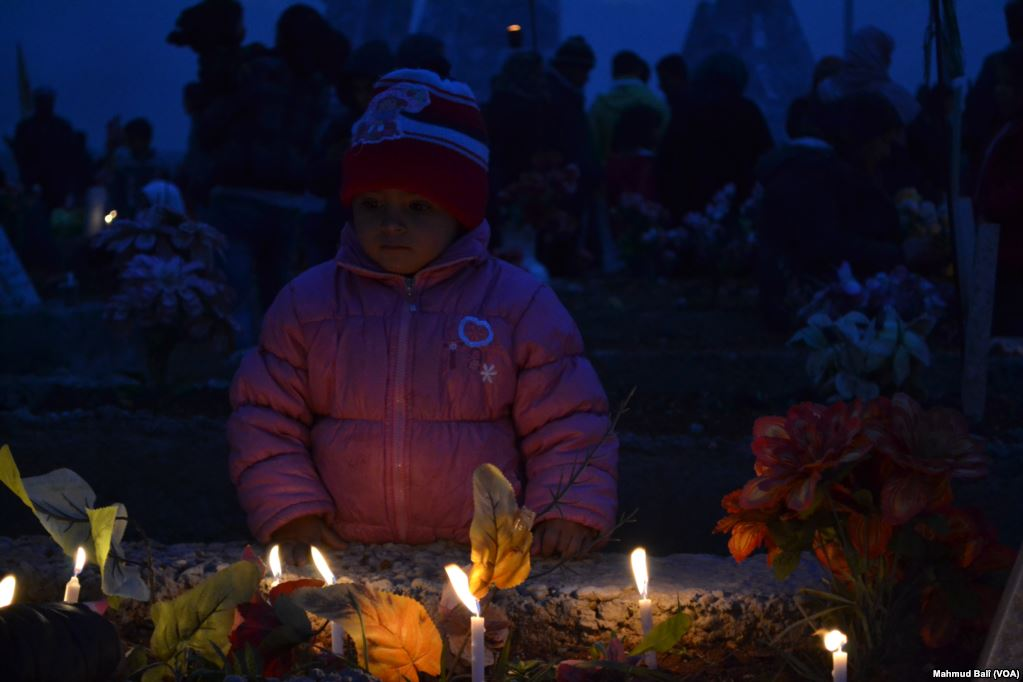
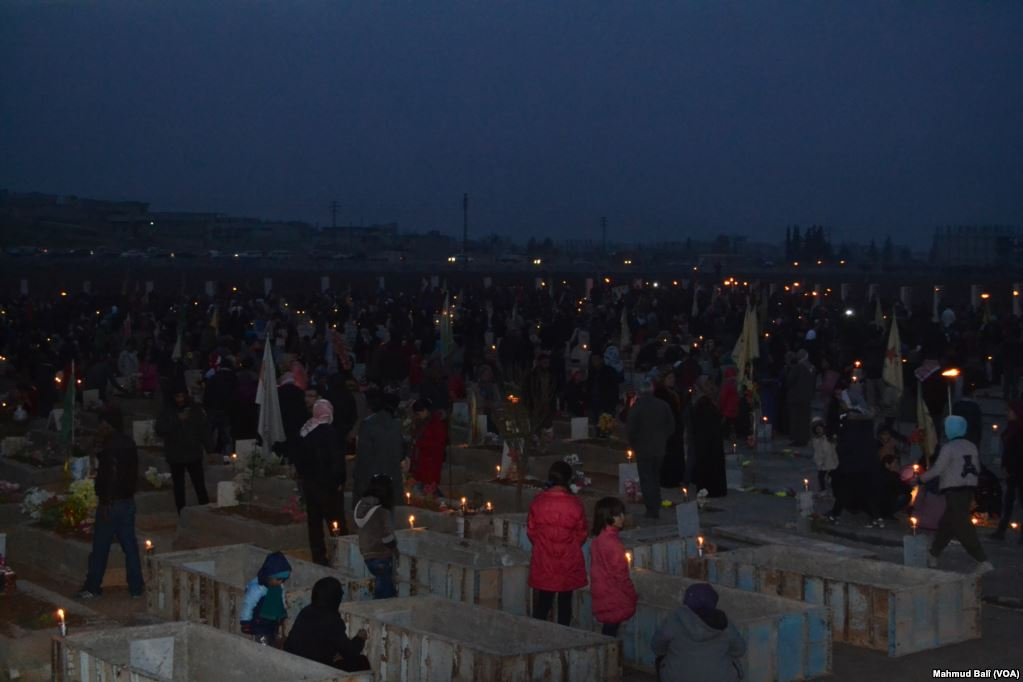
Cemetery in Kobani

Neighbouring Turkey was consistently hostile, which was attributed to a perceived threat from the region's emergence, as it could encourage activism for autonomy among Kurds in Turkey in the Kurdish–Turkish conflict. In this context, in particular the region's leading Democratic Union Party (PYD) and the YPG militia were members of the Kurdistan Communities Union (KCK) network of organisations, which also included both political and military Kurdish organizations in Turkey itself, including the Kurdistan Workers' Party (PKK). Turkey's policy towards the region was based on an economic blockade, persistent attempts at international isolation, opposition to the cooperation between the American-led anti-ISIL coalition and the Syrian Democratic Forces, and support for Islamist opposition fighters hostile to the autonomous region, with some reports even including ISIL among these. Turkey attacked the region's territory and defence forces militarily on several occasions. This resulted in some expressions of international solidarity with the region. (Note: Concerns over Turkish actions were expressed by US, Russian, and German officials.)

On 9 October 2019, Turkey launched an attack on northern Syria "to destroy the terror corridor" on the Turkish southern border, as President Erdogan put it, after U.S. President Donald Trump abandoned his support. Subsequent media reports speculated that the offensive would lead to the displacement of hundreds of thousands of people.

In December 2019, an international conference hosted by the International Alliance for the Defence of Rights and Freedoms (AIDL) was held at the European Parliament, where the Turkish invasion of northeastern Syria was condemned and calls were made for the self-declared Autonomous Administration of North East Syria to be recognized and included in the UN-led Constitutional Committee tasked with drafting a new constitution for Syria. The official position of the European Union remained the same, however: that the Autonomous Administration should be "respected" and included in talks, while rejecting "any recognition in the national sense of the word" and maintaining that "the territorial integrity of Syria is fundamental".

=== Law and security ===
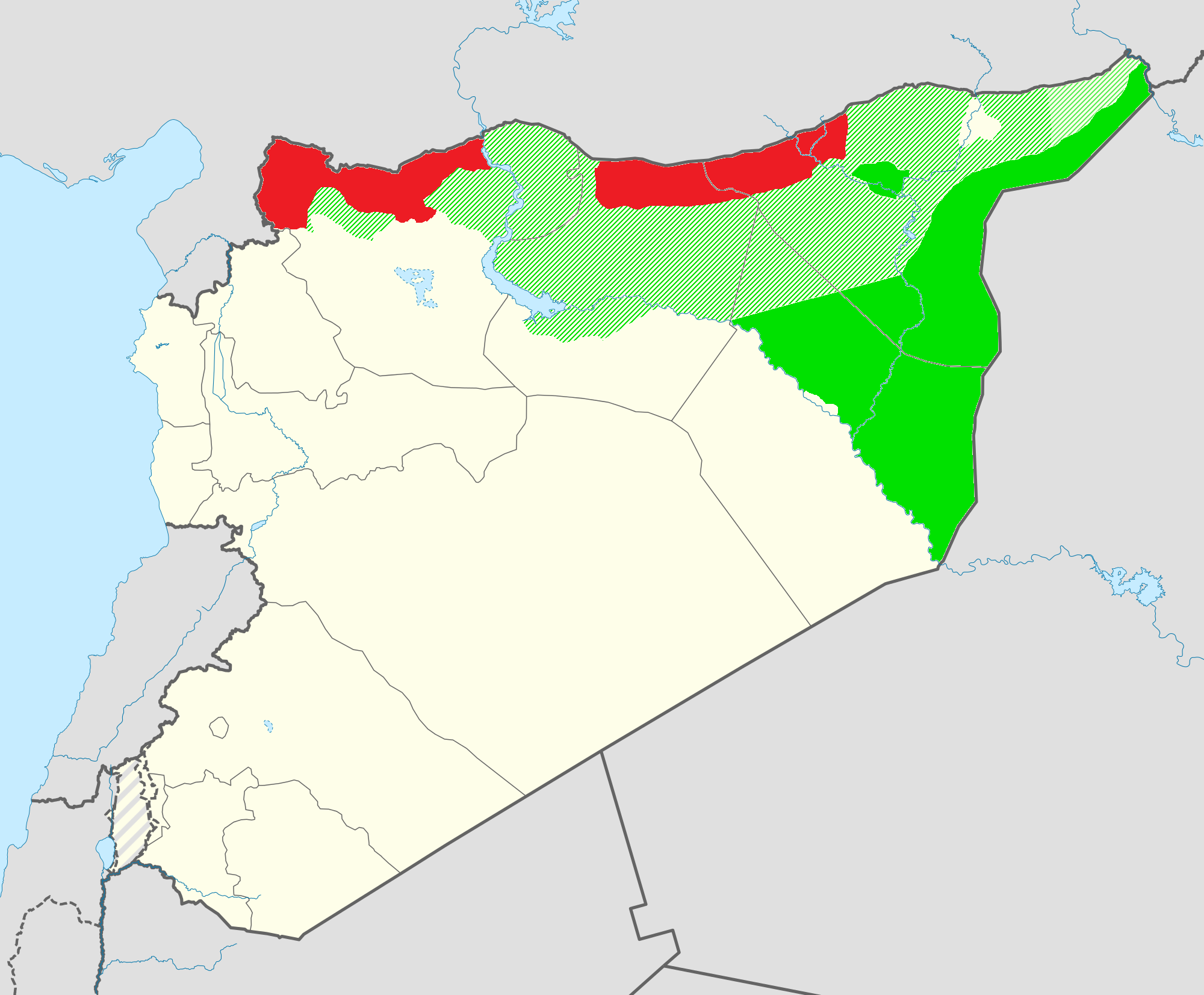
SDF-controlled territory (green) and Turkish-occupied territory (red) in October 2019

==== Legal system ====
Syrian civil laws were valid in the region if they did not conflict with the Constitution of the autonomous region. One example of an amendment was the personal status law, which in Syria was based on Sharia and applied by Sharia Courts, while the secular autonomous region proclaimed absolute equality of women under the law, allowed civil marriage, and banned forced marriage, polygamy and underage marriage.

A new criminal justice approach was implemented that emphasized restoration over retribution. The death penalty was abolished. Prisons housed mostly people charged with terrorist activity related to ISIL and other extremist groups. A September 2015 report by Amnesty International stated that 400 people were incarcerated by the region's authorities and criticized deficiencies in due process within the judicial system of the region.

At the local level, citizens created Peace and Consensus Committees, which made group decisions on minor criminal cases and disputes, while separate committees resolved issues of specific concern to women's rights, such as domestic violence and marriage. At the regional level, citizens (who did not need to be trained jurists) were elected by the regional People's Councils to serve on seven-member People's Courts. At the next level were four Appeals Courts, composed of trained jurists. The court of last resort was the Regional Court, which served the region as a whole. Separate from this system, the Constitutional Court rendered decisions on the compatibility of acts of government and legal proceedings with the constitution of the region (called the Social Contract).

==== Policing and security ====
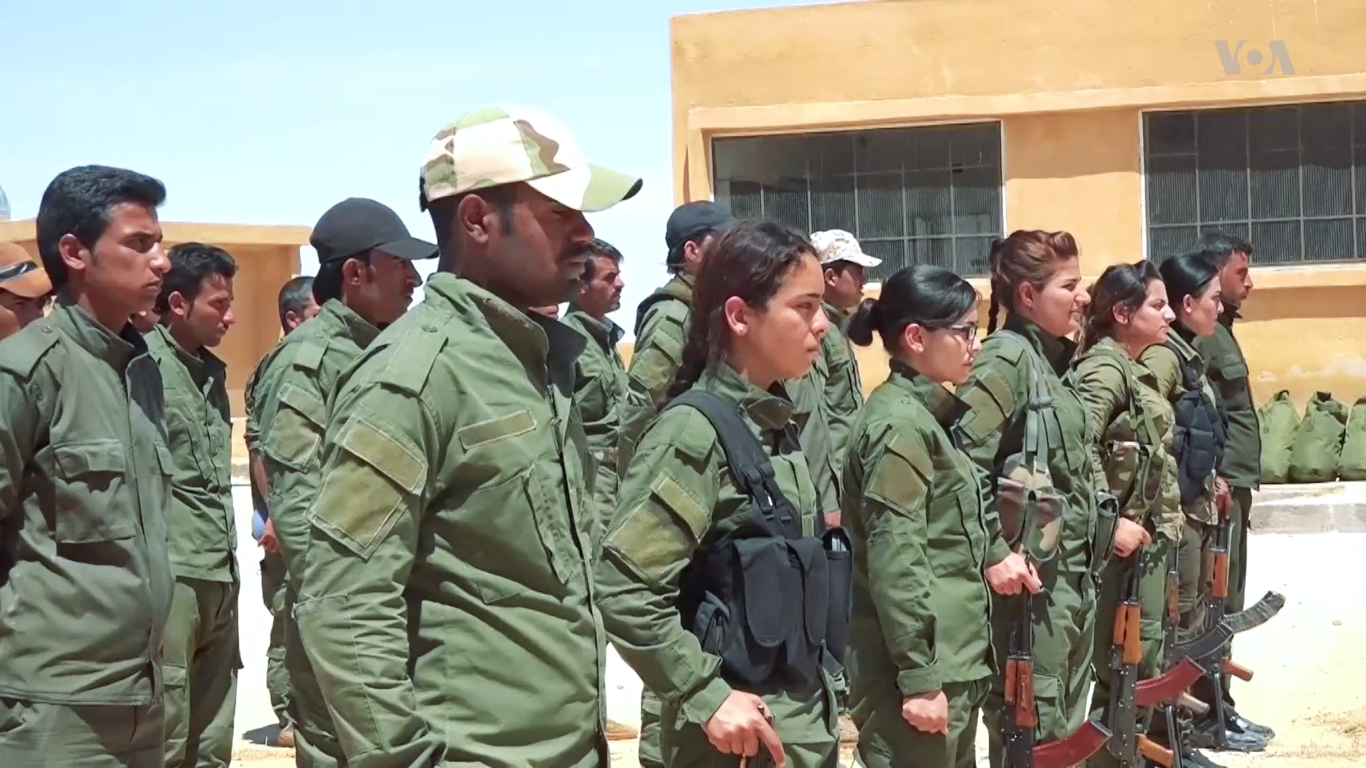
Members of the Raqqa Internal Security Forces (RISF) in Ayn Issa

Policing in the region was performed by the Asayish armed formation. The Asayish was established on 25 July 2013 to fill the security gap after the Syrian security forces withdrew. Under the Constitution of North and East Syria, policing was a competence of the regions. The Asayish forces of the regions were composed of 26 official bureaus that aimed to provide security and solutions to social problems. The six main units of the Asayish were the Checkpoints Administration, Anti-Terror Forces Command (HAT), Intelligence Directorate, Organized Crime Directorate, Traffic Directorate, and Treasury Directorate. 218 Asayish centers were established, and 385 checkpoints with 10 Asayish members at each checkpoint were set up. 105 Asayish offices provided security against ISIL on the frontlines across Northern Syria. Larger cities had general directorates responsible for all aspects of security, including road controls. Each region had a HAT command, and each Asayish center organized itself autonomously.

Throughout the region, the municipal Civilian Defense Forces (HPC) and the regional Self-Defense Forces (HXP) also served local-level security. In Jazira Region, the Asayish were further complemented by the Assyrian Sutoro police force, which was organized in every area with an Assyrian population and provided security and solutions to social problems in collaboration with other Asayish units. The Khabour Guards and Nattoreh, though not police units, also had a presence in the area and provided security in towns along the Khabur River. The Bethnahrain Women's Protection Forces also maintained a police branch. In the areas taken from ISIL during the Raqqa campaign, the Raqqa Internal Security Forces and Manbij Internal Security Forces operated as police forces. Deir ez-Zor also maintained an Internal Security Forces unit.

==== Militias ====
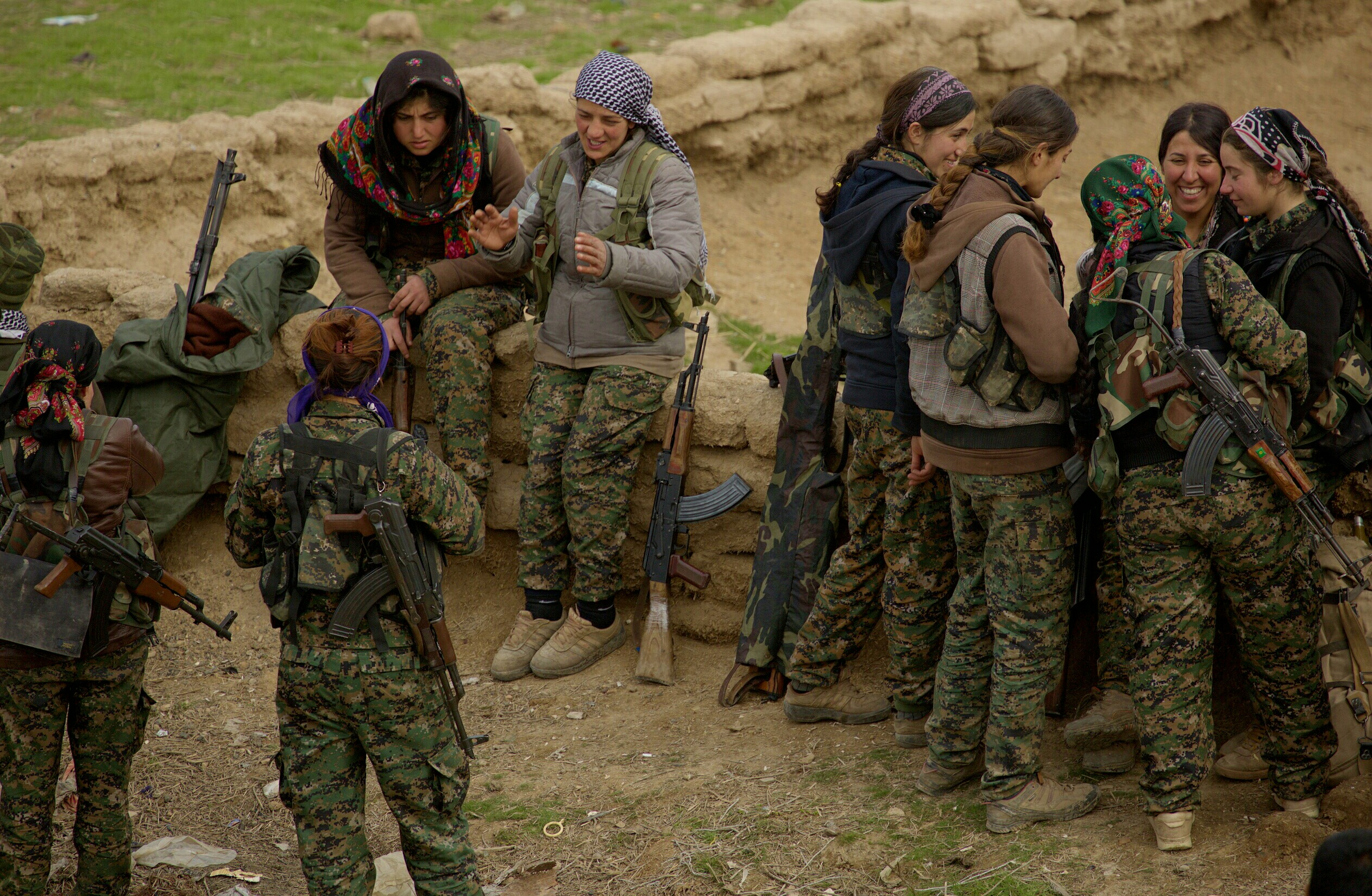
Female fighters of the YPJ play a significant combat role in the region.

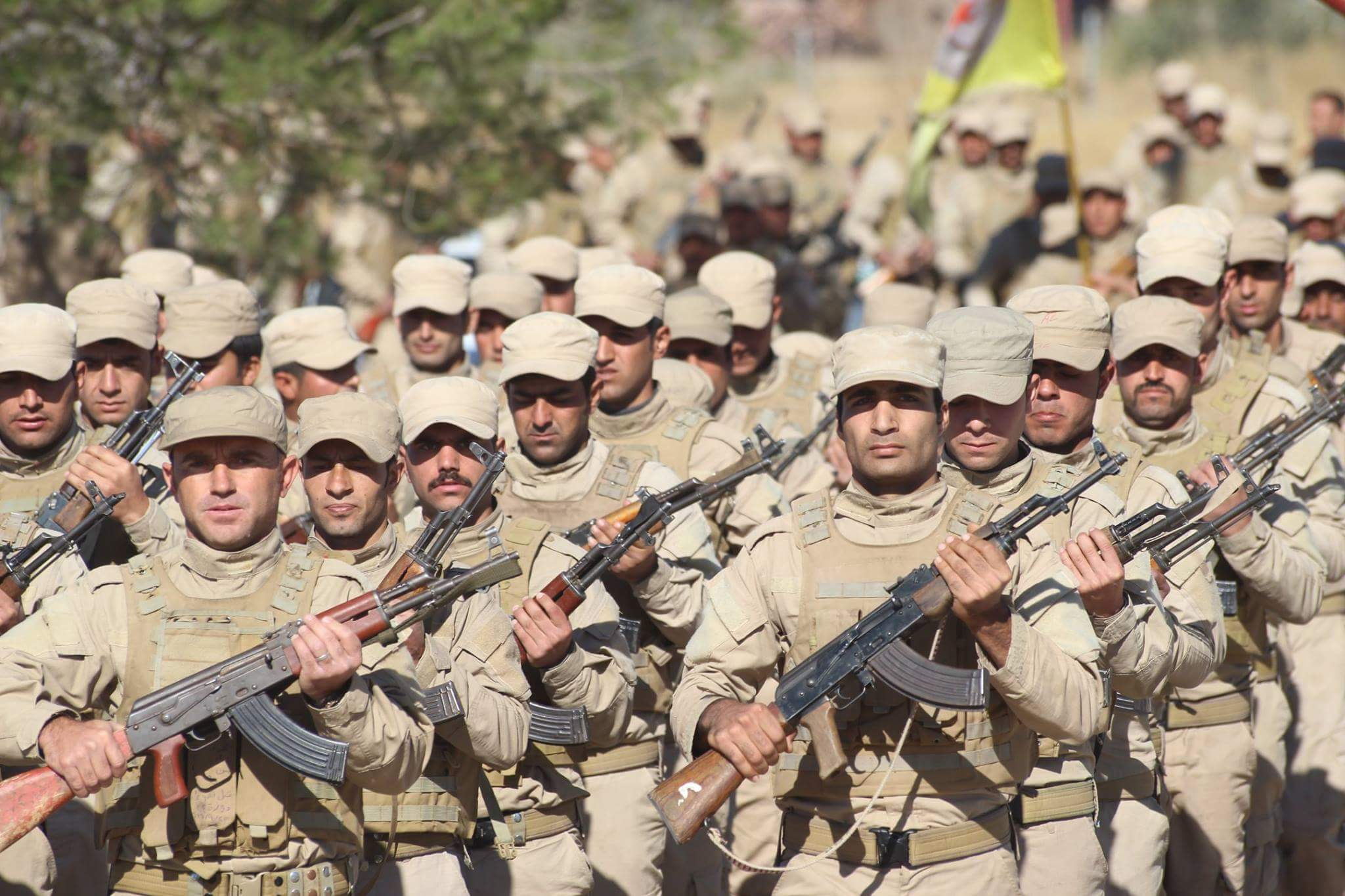
HXP militiamen on parade in 2016

The main military force of the region was the Syrian Democratic Forces (SDF), an alliance of Syrian rebel groups formed in 2015 that was dissolved in 2026. The SDF was led by the Kurdish-majority People's Protection Units (Yekîneyên Parastina Gel, YPG). The YPG was founded by the PYD after the 2004 Qamishli clashes, but became active during the Syrian Civil War. There was also the Syriac Military Council (MFS), an Assyrian militia associated with the Syriac Union Party. There were also Free Syrian Army groups in the alliance, such as the Army of Revolutionaries and the Northern Democratic Brigade, tribal militias such as the Arab Al-Sanadid Forces, and municipal military councils in the Shahba region, such as the Manbij Military Council, the Al-Bab Military Council, and the Jarablus Military Council.

The Self-Defence Forces (HXP) was a territorial defense militia and the only conscripted armed force in the region.

=== Human rights ===
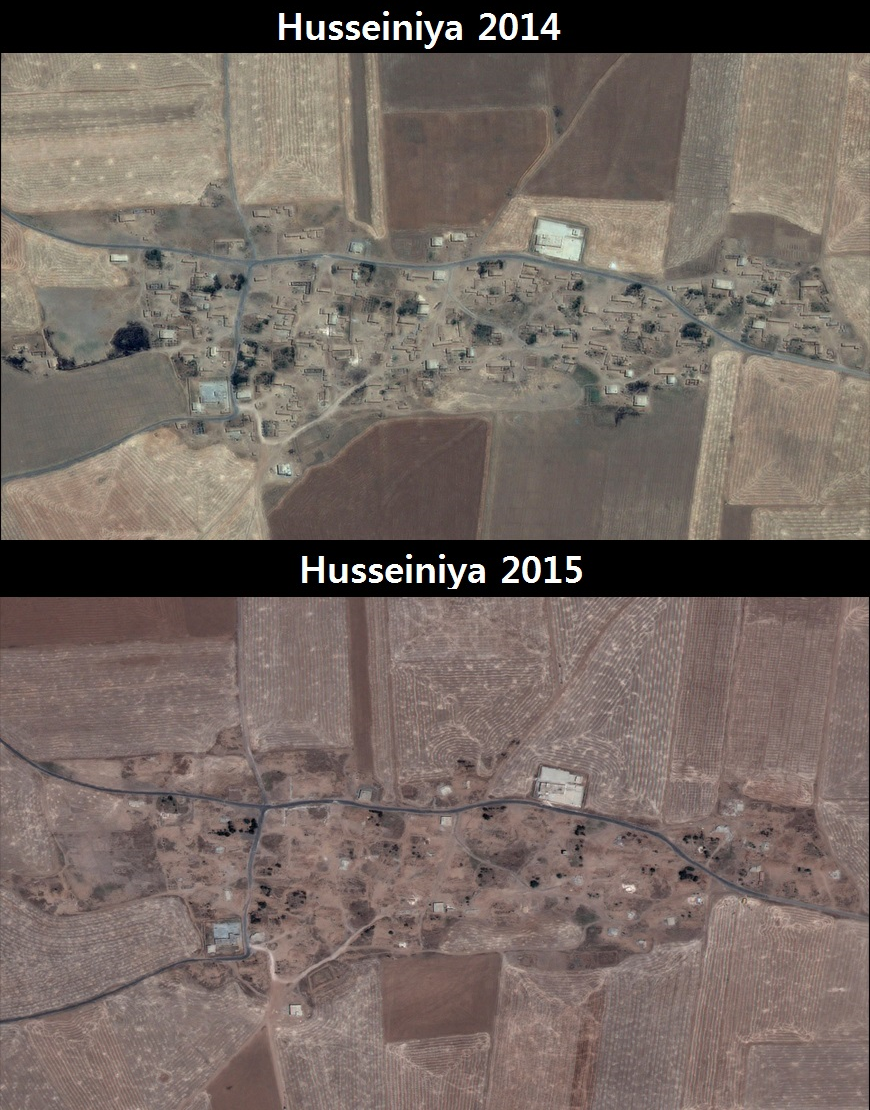
Satellite images of the village of Husseiniya in 2014 and 2015, reportedly leveled by the YPG

In the course of the Syrian Civil War, including the years 2014 and 2015, reports by Human Rights Watch (HRW) and Amnesty International stated that militias associated with the autonomous region were committing war crimes, in particular members of the People's Protection Units (YPG). The reports from 2014 included reports of arbitrary arrests and torture, while other reports included the use of child soldiers. After the reports, the YPG publicly accepted the deficiencies and in October 2015 the YPG demobilized 21 minors from military service in its ranks. Reports were comprehensively debated and contested by both the YPG and other human rights organizations. In 2018, HRW again accused the YPG of recruiting minors. The YPG responded that if 16- and 17-year-olds were hired, their relatives were notified but did not have to consent, and the minors were kept away from combat zones. Since September 2015, the YPG received human rights training from Geneva Call and other international organizations. A September 2020 article from Syria Direct found that the SDF was continuing to recruit child soldiers, despite signing an action plan on 1 July 2019 with the United Nations to "end and prevent the recruitment and use of child soldiers."

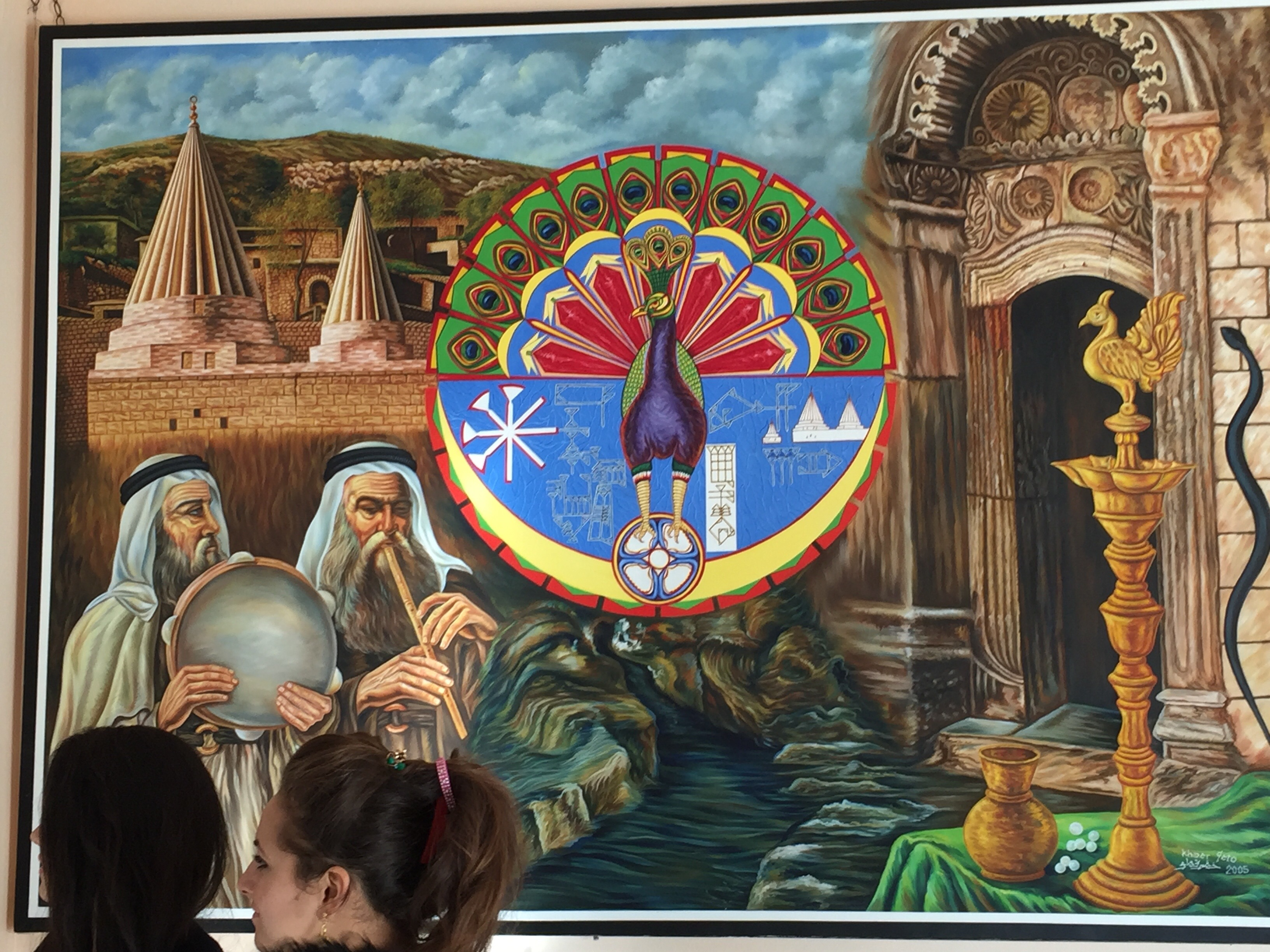
SDF Yazidis praying in a Yazidi temple, with a mural of the holy Melek Taus, in DAANES following the expulsion of ISIS

The region's civil government was hailed in international media for human rights advancement, in particular in the legal system, concerning women's rights, ethnic minority rights, freedom of speech and press, and for hosting inbound refugees. The political agenda of "trying to break the honor-based religious and tribal rules that confined women" was controversial in conservative quarters of society. Conscription into the Self-Defence Forces (HXP) was called a human rights violation by those who called the region's institutions illegitimate, while extra-legal abduction into military service was reported, such as in 2014 when a 15-year-old girl was kidnapped and recruited into the YPJ.

Some persistent issues in the region concerned ethnic minority rights. One issue of contention was the consequence of Baathist Syrian government's expropriation of land from Kurdish owners and settling of tribal Arabs there in 1973 and 2007. There were calls to expel the settlers and return the land to its previous owners, which led the political leadership of the region to press the Syrian government for a comprehensive solution.

During the Syrian Civil War, organizations such as the Turkish government, Amnesty International and the Middle East Observer stated that SDF was forcibly displacing inhabitants of captured areas with predominantly Arab populations, such as Tell Abyad. These displacements were considered attempts at ethnic cleansing. However, the head of the Syrian Observatory for Human Rights rebutted these reports and the UN Independent International Commission of Inquiry found no evidence of YPG or SDF forces committing ethnic cleansing in order to change the demographic composition of territories under their control.

== Economy ==
The Jazira Region was a major wheat and cotton producer and had a considerable oil industry. The Euphrates Region suffered the most destruction of the three regions and faced huge challenges in reconstruction, and had also seen some greenhouse agriculture construction. Price controls were managed by local committees, which could set the prices of basic goods such as food and medical goods.

It was theorized that the Assad government had deliberately underdeveloped parts of Northern Syria in order to Arabize the region and make secession attempts less likely. During the Syrian Civil War, the infrastructure of the region on average experienced less destruction than other parts of Syria. In May 2016, Ahmed Yousef, head of the Economic Body and chairman of Afrin University, stated that at the time, the economic output of the region (including agriculture, industry and oil) accounted for about 55% of Syria's gross domestic product. In 2014, the Syrian government was still paying some state employees, but fewer than before. However, the administration of the region stated that "none of our projects are financed by the regime".

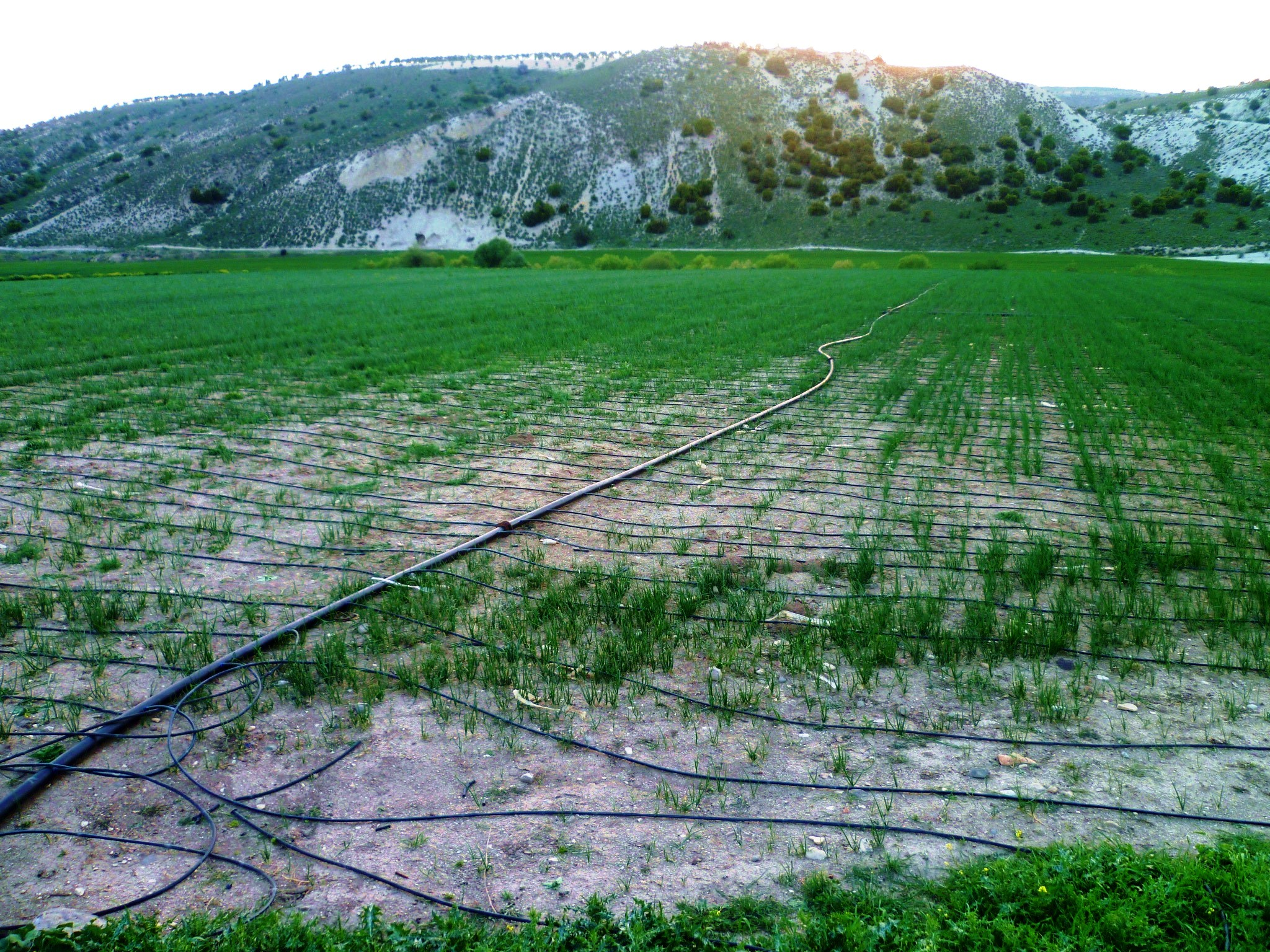
Sustainable micro-irrigation system in Syria created by the DAANES in southern Afrin

At first, there were no direct or indirect taxes on people or businesses in the region; instead, the administration raised money mainly through tariffs and selling oil and other natural resources. However, in July 2017, it was reported that the administration in the Jazira Region had started to collect income tax to provide for public services in the region. In May 2016, The Wall Street Journal reported that traders in Syria experienced the region as "the one place where they aren't forced to pay bribes." Electricity was produced by the Tabqa Dam on the Euphrates River, Syria's largest.

The main sources of revenue for the autonomous region were presented as: 1. Public properties such as grain silos and oil and gas in the Jazira Region, 2. Local taxation and customs fees taken at the border crossings, 3. Service delivery, 4. Remittances from Iraq and Turkey, and 5. Local donations. In 2015, the autonomous administration shared information about the region's finances, where its 2014 revenue was about LS 3 billion (≈US$5.8 million), of which 50% was spent on "self-defense and protection", 18% for the Jazira Canton (now Jazira Region), 8.5% for the Kobani Canton (now Euphrates Region), 8.5% for the Afrin Canton (later Afrin Region), 15% for the "Internal Committee", and any remainder was a reserve for the next year. In 2021, the DAANES had by far the highest average salaries and standard of living throughout Syria, with salaries being twice as large as in regime-controlled Syria. Following the collapse of the Syrian pound, the DAANES doubled salaries to maintain inflation and allow for good wages. The DAANES still faced challenges with distribution, food security, and healthcare.

=== External economic relations ===
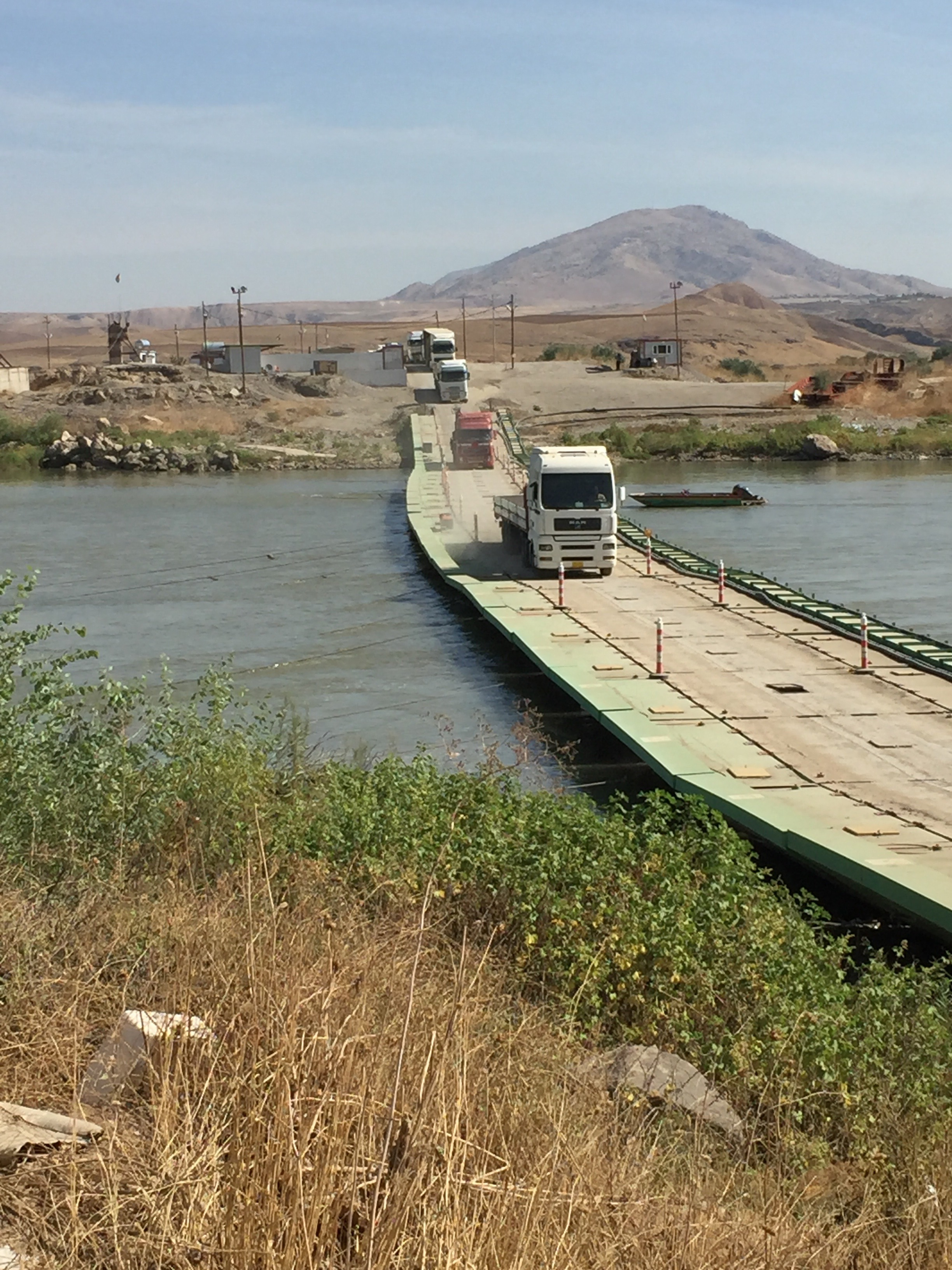
Border crossing at Semalka between Iraqi Kurdistan government and DAANES on the Tigris river

Oil and food production was substantial, so they were important exports. Agricultural products included sheep, grain and cotton. Important imports were consumer goods and auto parts. Trade with Turkey and access to humanitarian and military aid were difficult due to a blockade by Turkey. Turkey did not allow business people or goods to cross its border. The blockade from adjacent territories held by Turkey and ISIL, and partially also the KRG, temporarily caused heavy distortions of relative prices in Jazira Region and Euphrates Region (while separate, Afrin Region bordered government-controlled territory since February 2016); for example, in Jazira Region and Euphrates Region, through 2016, petrol cost only half as much as bottled water.

The Semalka Border Crossing with Iraqi Kurdistan had been intermittently closed by the Kurdistan Regional Government (KRG), but had been open permanently since June 2016, and along with the establishment of a corridor to Syrian government-controlled territory in April 2017, economic exchange increasingly normalized. Further, in May 2017 in northern Iraq, the Popular Mobilization Forces fighting ISIL cleared a corridor connecting the autonomous region and Iraqi government-controlled territory.

=== Economy policy framework ===
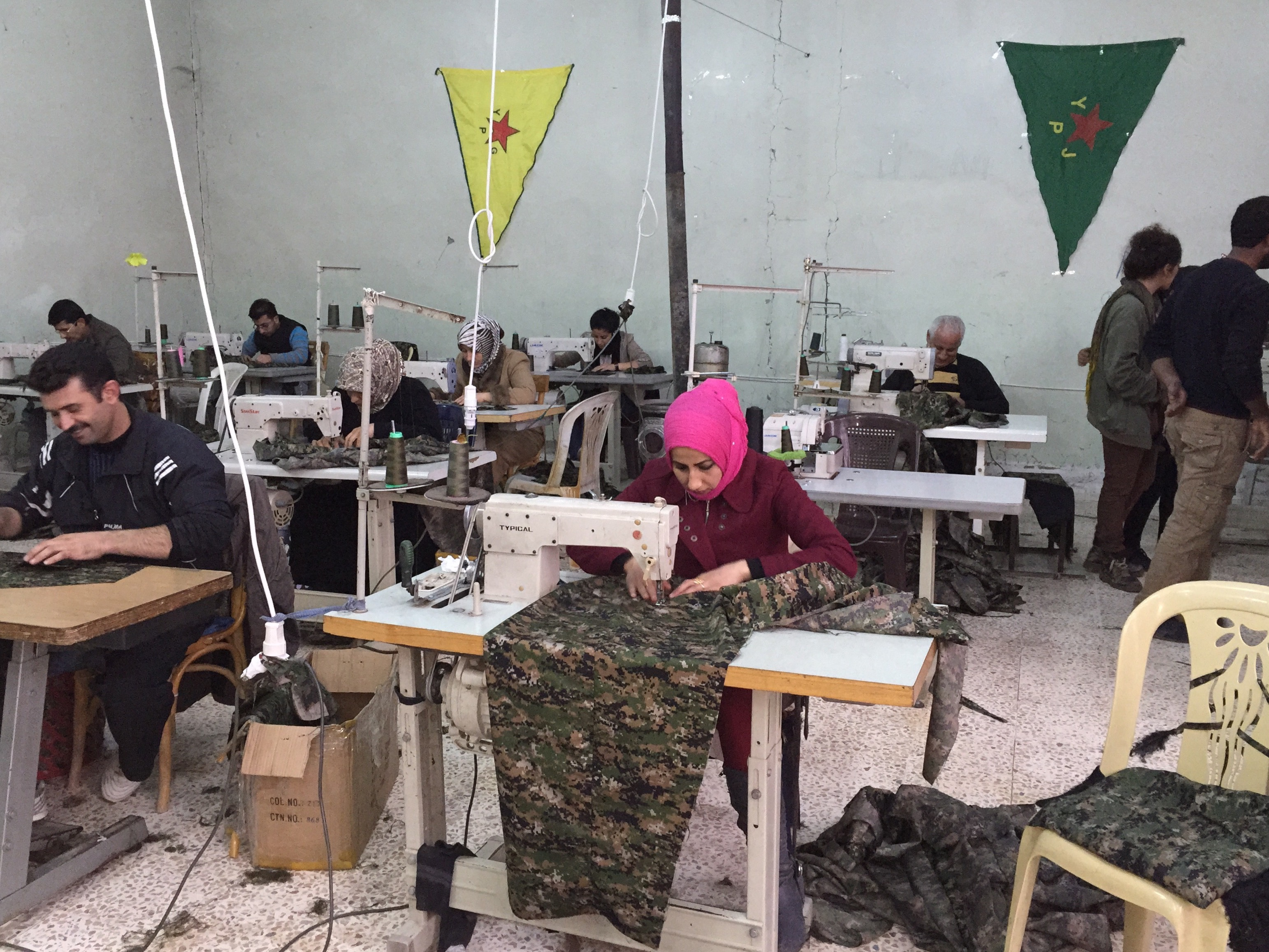
The autonomous administration is supporting efforts for workers to form cooperatives, such as this sewing cooperative in Derik.

The autonomous region was ruled by a coalition which had been described as pursuing a model of economy that blended co-operative and private enterprise. In 2012, the PYD launched what it called the "Social Economy Plan", later renamed the "People's Economy Plan" (PEP). Private property and entrepreneurship were protected under the principle of "ownership by use". Dr. Dara Kurdaxi, a regional official, stated: "The method in Rojava was not so much against private property, but rather had the goal of putting private property in the service of all the peoples who lived in Rojava." Communes and co-operatives were established to provide essentials. Co-operatives accounted for a large proportion of agricultural production and were active in construction, factories, energy production, livestock, pistachio and roasted seeds, and public markets. Several hundred instances of collective farming occurred across towns and villages in the region, with communes consisting of approximately 20–35 people. According to the region's "Ministry of Economics", approximately three-quarters of all property had been placed under community ownership and a third of production had been transferred to direct management by workers' councils.

== Demographics ==
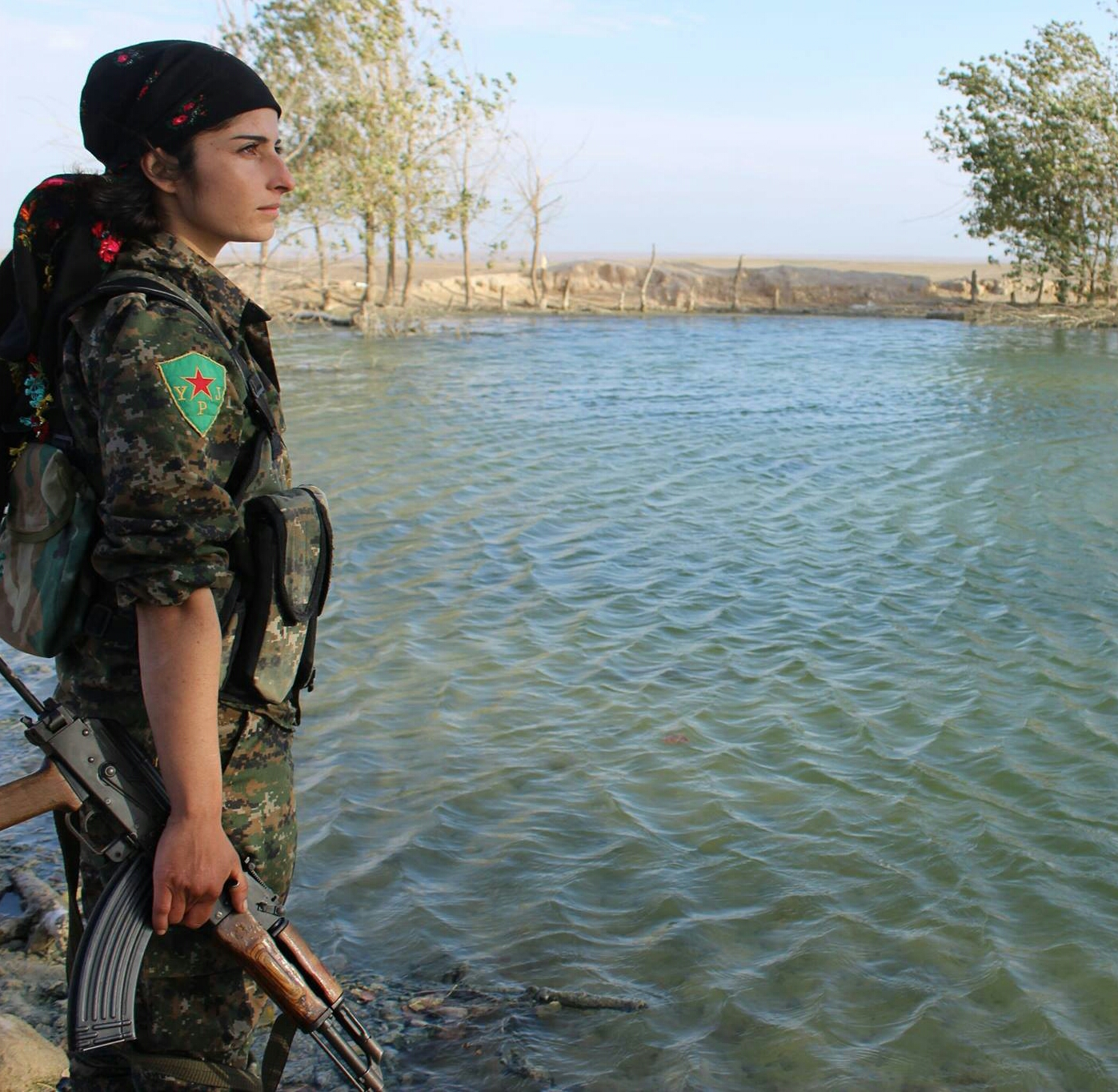
A YPJ member next to a large reservoir in Northern Syria

The demographics of the region had historically been highly diverse, with several major shifts in regard to which groups formed majorities or minorities in the preceding centuries. (Note: Since at least the early Middle Ages, northern Syria had been settled by a mixed population of Arabs, Turkmen, Kurds, and Christian ethnoreligious groups including Assyrian people. Arab nomads came to dominate the region after the Ikhshidid dynasty's decline in the 10th century. During the Ottoman Empire (1516–1922), large Kurdish-speaking tribal groups both settled in and were deported to areas of northern Syria from Anatolia. In addition, Cherkessians farmers migrated to northern Syria in the 19th century.) The Al-Hasakah Governorate had historically been the domain of nomad and sedentary Arabs. Most of the Kurdish population in the area had immigrated from Turkey during the 20th century. One major shift in modern times occurred in the early part of the 20th century due to the Assyrian and Armenian genocides, when many Assyrians and Armenians fled to Syria from Turkey. In the 1920s, after the failed Kurdish rebellions in Kemalist Turkey, there was a large influx of Kurds to Syria's northeast, called "Jazira province" at the time. It was estimated that 25,000 Kurds fled to Syria at this time under French Mandate authorities, who encouraged their immigration, and granted them Syrian citizenship. Consequently, the French official reports showed the existence of at most 45 Kurdish villages in Jazira prior to 1927. A new wave of refugees arrived in 1929. The mandatory authorities continued to encourage Kurdish immigration into Syria, and by 1939, the villages numbered between 700 and 800. Another account by Sir John Hope Simpson estimated the number of Kurds in Jazira province at 20,000 out of 100,000 people at the end of 1930. The number of Kurds continued to grow, and the French geographers Fevret and Gibert estimated that in 1953, out of the total 146,000 inhabitants of Jazira, agriculturalist Kurds made up 60,000 (41%), nomad Arabs 50,000 (34%), and a quarter of the population were Christians.

Under the French Mandate of Syria, newly arriving Kurds were granted citizenship by French Mandate authorities and enjoyed considerable rights, as the French Mandate authority encouraged minority autonomy as part of a divide and rule strategy and recruited heavily from the Kurds and other minority groups, such as Alawite and Druze, for its local armed forces. The last significant wave of Kurdish incoming migration from Turkey occurred between 1945 and 1961, which strongly contributed to the growth of al-Hasakah Governorate's population from 240,000 to 305,000 between 1954 and 1961. In addition to the demographic changes brought about by Kurdish immigration from Turkey, the Syrian government initiated an Arabization policy. Therefore, 4,000 Arab families from areas flooded by the Tabqa Dam in Raqqa and Aleppo were resettled in new villages in al-Hasakah Governorate.

Another shift in modern times was the Baath policy of settling additional Arab population in northern Syria, while displacing local Kurds. Most recently, during the Syrian Civil War, many refugees fled to the north of the country. Some ethnic Arab citizens from Iraq also fled to northern Syria. However, as of January 2018, only two million people were estimated to remain in the area under the region's administration, with estimates of around half a million people having emigrated since the beginning of the civil war, to a large degree because of the economic hardships the region had faced during the war. As a result of the civil war, estimates as to the ethnic composition of northern Syria varied widely, ranging from claims about a Kurdish majority and Arab minority to claims about Kurds being a small minority; Al Jazeera stated in October 2019 that just 10 percent of the 4.5 million inhabitants of northern and northeastern Syria were Kurds.

=== Population ===
This list included all cities and towns in the region with more than 10,000 inhabitants. The population figures were given according to the 2004 Syrian census.

English name	Kurdish Name	Arabic Name	Syriac Name	Turkish Name	Population	Region
Raqqa	Reqa	الرقة	ܪܩܗ	Rakka	220,488	Raqqa
Al-Hasakah	Hesîçe	الحسكة	ܚܣܟܗ	Haseke	188,160	Jazira
Qamishli	Qamişlo	القامشلي	ܩܡܫܠܐ	Kamışlı	184,231	Jazira
Tabqa	Tebqa	الطبقة	ܛܒܩܗ	Tabka	69,425	Tabqa
Kobani	Kobanî	عين العرب	ܟܘܒܐܢܝ	Arappınar	44,821	Euphrates
Hajin	Hecîn	هجين	ܗܓܝܢ		37,935	Deir Ez-Zor
Amuda	Amûdê	عامودا	ܥܐܡܘܕܐ	Amudiye	26,821	Jazira
Al-Malikiyah	Dêrika Hemko	المالكية	ܕܪܝܟ	Deyrik	26,311	Jazira
Gharanij		غرانيج	ܓܪܐܢܝܓ		23,009	Deir Ez-Zor
Abu Hamam	Ebû Hemam	أبو حمام	ܐܒܘ ܚܡܐܡ		21,947	Deir Ez-Zor
Al-Shaafah		الشعفة	ܫܥܦܗ		18,956	Deir Ez-Zor
Al-Qahtaniyah	Tirbespî	القحطانية	ܩܒܪ̈ܐ ܚܘܪ̈ܐ	Kubur el Bid	16,946	Jazira
Al-Mansurah		المنصورة	ܡܢܨܘܪܗ		16,158	Tabqa
Al-Shaddadah	Şeddadê	الشدادي	ܫܕܐܕܝ	Şaddadi	15,806	Jazira
Al-Muabbada	Girkê Legê	المعبدة	ܡܥܒܕܗ	Muabbada	15,759	Jazira
Al-Kishkiyah		الكشكية	ܟܫܟܝܗ		14,979	Deir Ez-Zor
Al-Sabaa wa Arbain	Seba û Erbîyn	السبعة وأربعين	ܣܒܥܗ ܘܐܪܒܥܝܢ	El Seba ve Arbayn	14,177	Jazira
Rmelan	Rimêlan	رميلان	ܪܡܝܠܐܢ	Rimelan	11,500	Jazira
Al-Baghuz Fawqani	Baxoz	الباغوز فوقاني	ܒܐܓܘܙ ܦܘܩܐܢܝ		10,649	Deir Ez-Zor

=== Ethnic groups ===
Two ethnic groups had a significant presence throughout Northern Syria:

- Arabs were an ethnic group or ethnolinguistic group living throughout Northern Syria, mainly defined by Arabic as their first language. They encompassed Bedouin tribes who traced their ancestry to the Arabian Peninsula as well as arabized indigenous peoples and preexisting Arab groups. Arabs formed the majority or plurality in some parts of Northern Syria, in particular in the southern parts of the Jazira Region, in Tell Abyad District and in Azaz District. While in Shahba region the term Arab was mainly used to denote arabized Kurds and arabized Syrians, in Euphrates Region and in Jazira Region it mainly denoted ethnic Arab Bedouin populations.
- Kurds were an ethnic group living in northeastern and northwestern Syria, culturally and linguistically classified among the Iranian peoples. Many Kurds considered themselves descended from the ancient Iranian people of the Medes, using a calendar dating from 612 BC, when the Assyrian capital of Nineveh was conquered by the Medes. Kurds formed 55% of the 2010 population of what later became both Jazira Region and Euphrates Region.

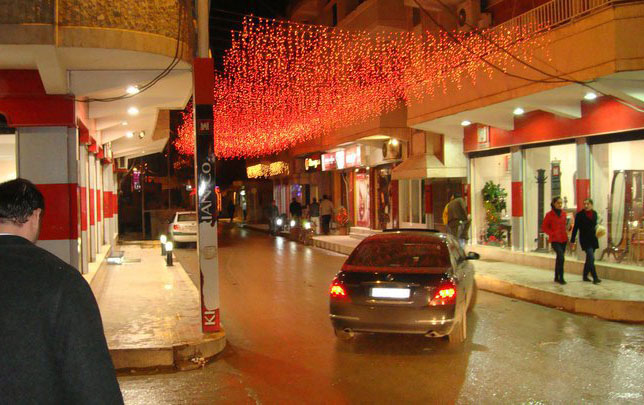
The streets of Qamishli during Christmas

Two ethnic groups had a significant presence in certain regions of Northern Syria:

- Assyrians were in Syria in the Jazira Region of the autonomous region, particularly in the urban areas (Qamishli, al-Hasakah, Ras al-Ayn, Al-Malikiyah, Al-Qahtaniyah), in the northeastern corner and in villages along the Khabur River in the Tell Tamer area. They traditionally spoke varieties of Northeastern Neo-Aramaic, a Semitic language. There were many Assyrians among recent refugees to Northern Syria, who had fled Islamist violence elsewhere in Syria back to their traditional lands. In the secular polyethnic political climate of the region, the Dawronoye modernization movement had a growing influence on Assyrian identity in the 21st century.
- Turkmen were an ethnic group with a major presence in the area between Afrin Region and Euphrates Region, where they formed regional majorities in the countryside from Azaz and Mare' to Jarabulus, and a minor presence in Afrin Region and Euphrates Region.

There were also smaller minorities of Armenians throughout Northern Syria as well as Chechens in Ras al-Ayn.

=== Languages ===
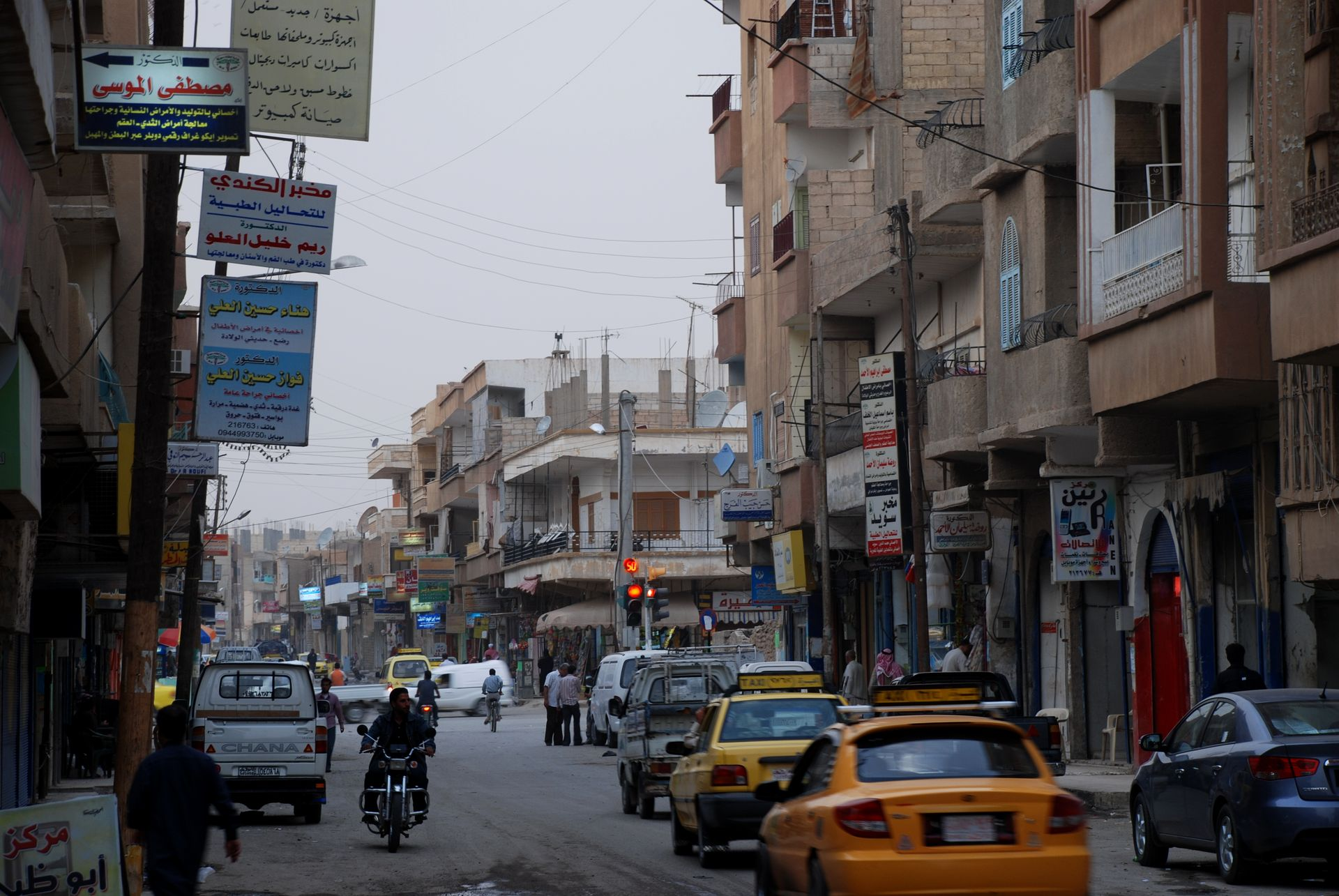
Town center of Raqqa, 2009

Regarding the status of different languages in the autonomous region, its "Social Contract" stipulated that "all languages in Northern Syria are equal in all areas of life, including social, educational, cultural, and administrative dealings. Every people shall organize its life and manage its affairs using its mother tongue." In practice, Arabic and Kurmanji were predominantly used across all areas and for most official documents, with Syriac being mainly used in the Jazira Region, with some usage across all areas.

The four main languages spoken in Northern Syria were the following, and came from three different language families:

- Arabic in the North Mesopotamian Arabic dialect (Modern Standard Arabic in education and writing), a Central Semitic language from the Semitic branch of the Afroasiatic language family.
- Kurdish (in Northern Kurdish dialect), a Northwestern Iranian language from the Indo-European language family.
- Eastern Aramaic languages mainly in the Turoyo and Assyrian Neo-Aramaic varieties (mainly Syriac in education and writing), Northwest Semitic languages from the Semitic branch of the Afroasiatic language family.
- Turkish (in Syrian Turkmen dialect), from the Turkic language family.

For these four languages, three different scripts were in use in Northern Syria:

- The Arabic alphabet (abjad) for Arabic
- The Latin alphabet for Kurdish, Turkish and Turoyo
- The Syriac alphabet for Syriac, Turoyo and Assyrian Neo-Aramaic

=== Religion ===
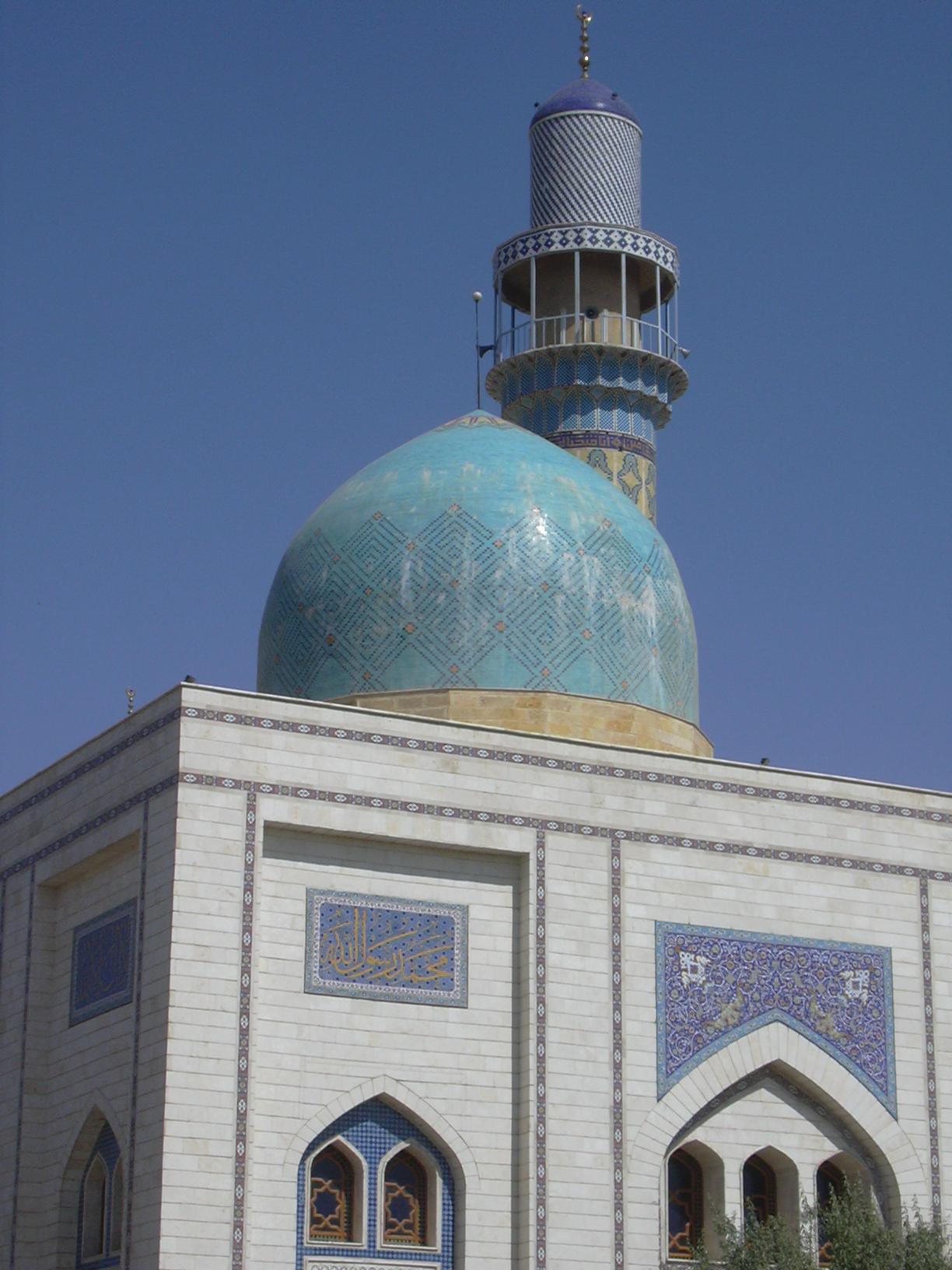
Uwais al-Qarni Shi'ite mosque in Raqqa (destroyed by ISIL in 2014)

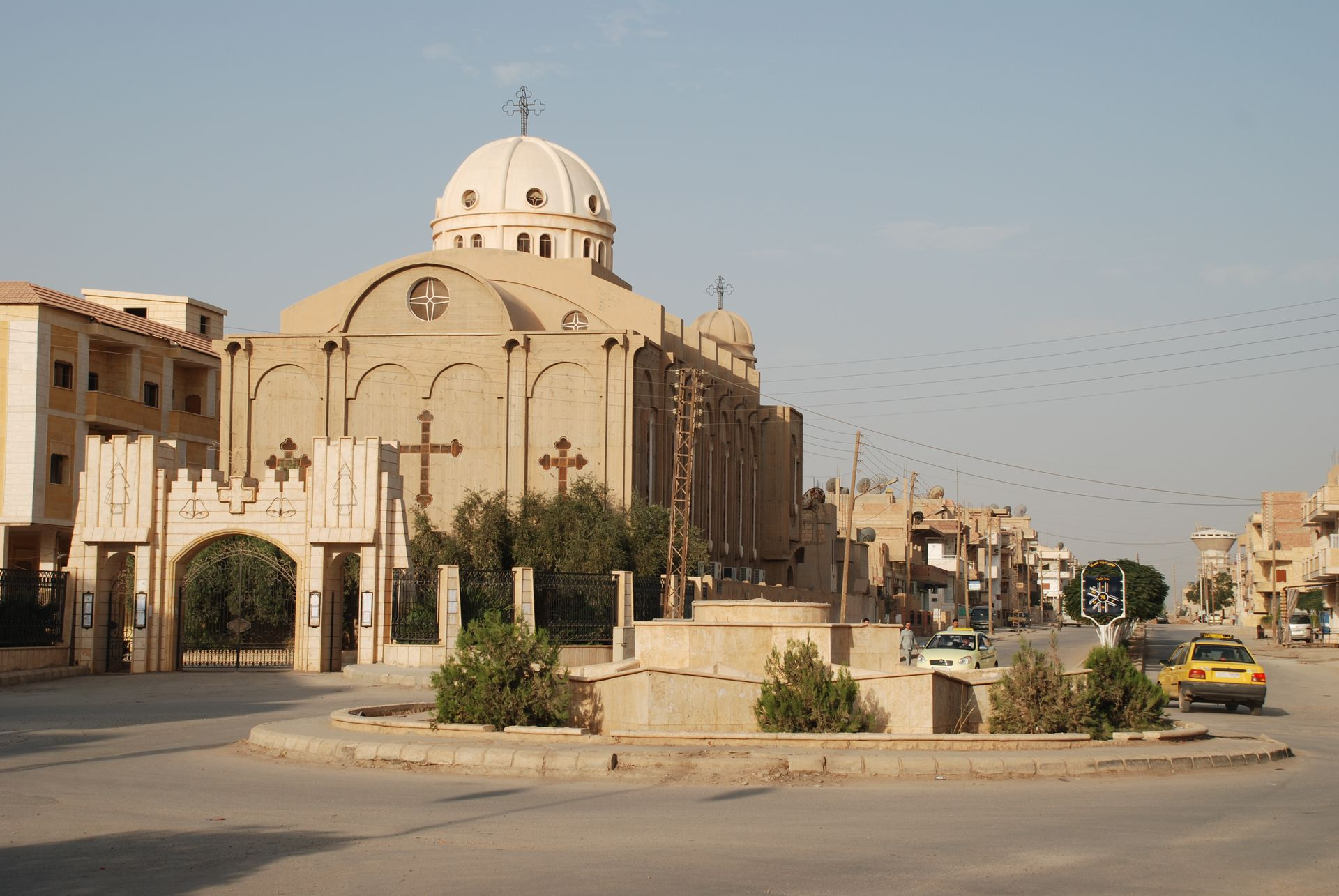
Assyrian cathedral in Al-Hasakah

Most ethnic Arab and Kurdish people in Northern Syria adhered to Sunni Islam, while ethnic Assyrian people generally were Syriac Orthodox, Chaldean Catholic, Syriac Catholic or adherents of the Assyrian Church of the East. There were also adherents to other religions, such as Yazidism. The dominant PYD party and the political administration in the region were decidedly secular.

=== Education ===
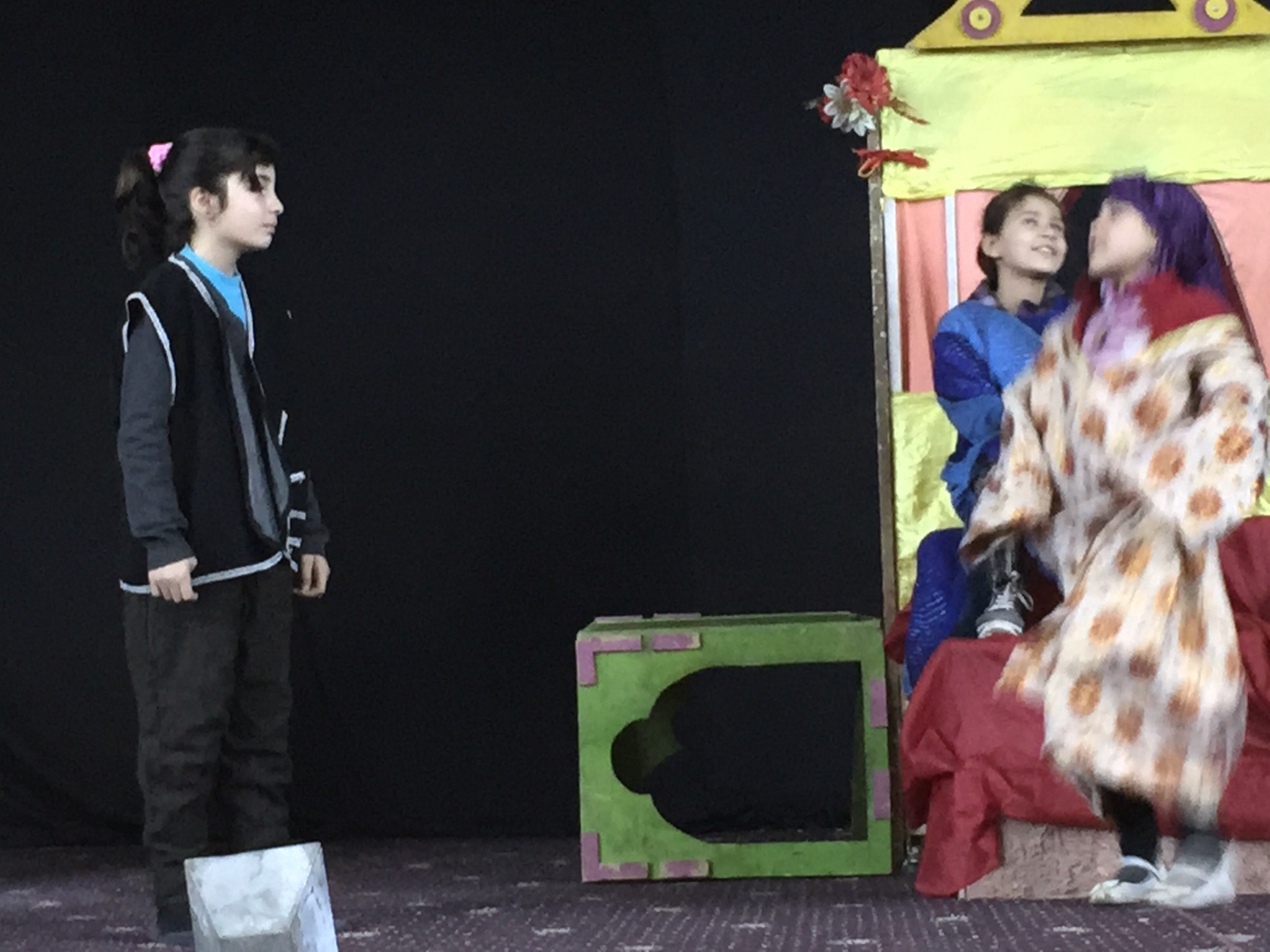
Theater center in Rojava in Kobani 2014

Under the rule of the Ba'ath Party, school education consisted of only Arabic language public schools, supplemented by Assyrian private confessional schools. In 2015, the region's administration introduced primary education in the native language (either Kurdish or Arabic) and mandatory bilingual education (Kurdish and Arabic) for public schools, with English as a mandatory third language. There were ongoing disagreements and negotiations over curriculums with the Syrian central government, which generally still paid the teachers in public schools.

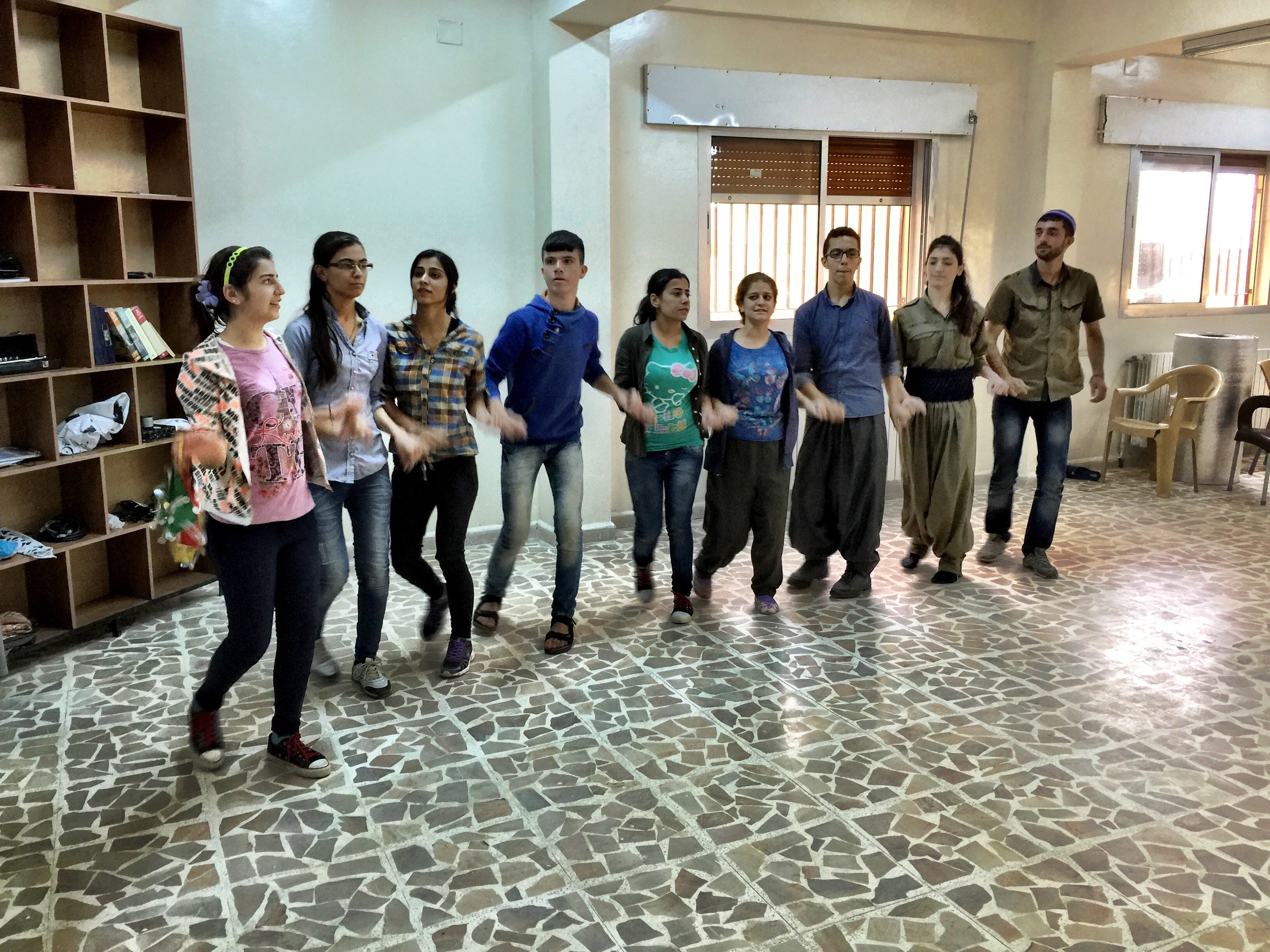
High school students in Tev-Cand in a classroom, dancing during a class on Syrian culture

In August 2016, the Ourhi Centre was founded by the Assyrian community in the city of Qamishli, to educate teachers in order to make Syriac-Aramaic an additional language in public schools in Jazira Region, which then started in the 2016/17 academic year. According to the region's Education Committee, in 2016/2017 "three curriculums have replaced the old one, to include teaching in three languages: Kurdish, Arabic and Syriac." In August 2017, Galenos Yousef Issa of the Ourhi Centre announced that the Syriac curriculum would be expanded to grade 6, which earlier had been limited to grade 3, with teachers being assigned to Syriac schools in Al-Hasakah, Al-Qahtaniyah and Al-Malikiyah. At the start of the academic year 2018–2019, the curricula in Kurdish and Arabic had been expanded to grades 1–12 and Syriac to grades 1–9. "Jineology" classes had also been introduced. In general, schools were encouraged to teach the administration's "utopian doctrine", which promoted diversity, democracy, and the ideas of Abdullah Öcalan. Local reactions to the changes to the school system and curriculum were mixed. While many praised the new system because it encouraged tolerance and allowed Kurds and other minorities to be taught in their own languages, others criticised it as de facto compulsory indoctrination.

The federal, regional and local administrations in the region put much emphasis on promoting libraries and educational centers, to facilitate learning and social and artistic activities. Examples were the Nahawand Center for Developing Children's Talents in Amuda (est. 2015) and the Rodî û Perwîn Library in Kobani (May 2016).

For Assyrian private confessional schools there had at first been no changes. However, in August 2018 it was reported that the region's authorities were trying to implement their own Syriac curriculum in private Christian schools that had continued to use an Arabic curriculum with limited Syriac classes approved by the Assad regime and originally developed by the Syrian Education Ministry in cooperation with Christian clergy in the 1950s. The threat of closure of schools that did not comply with this resulted in protests erupting in Qamishli. A deal was later reached in September 2018 between the region's authorities and the local Syriac Orthodox archbishopric, where the two first grades in these schools would learn the region's Syriac curriculum and grades three to six would continue to learn the Damascus-approved curriculum.

As of 2024, the region had three universities: University of Rojava in Qamishli, Kobani University in Kobani, and Al-Sharq University in Raqqa and Tabqa. The three universities were represented by the Universities Council of Northern and Eastern Syria.

While there had been no institution of tertiary education on the territory of the region at the onset of the Syrian Civil War, an increasing number of such institutions had been established by the regional administrations in the region since.

- In September 2014, the Mesopotamian Social Sciences Academy in Qamishli started classes. More such academies designed under a non-traditional academic philosophy and concept were in the process of being founded or planned.
- In August 2015, the traditionally-designed University of Afrin in Afrin started teaching, with initial programs in literature, engineering and economics, including institutes for medicine, topographic engineering, music and theater, business administration and the Kurdish language. After the Turkish army invaded Afrin in 2018, several of its students were transferred to the University of Rojava in Qamishli.
- In July 2016, Jazira Canton Board of Education started the University of Rojava in Qamishli, with faculties for Medicine, Engineering, Sciences, and Arts and Humanities. Programs taught included health, computer and agricultural engineering; physics, chemistry, history, psychology, geography, mathematics and primary school teaching and Kurdish literature. There was an additional Faculty for Petroleum and Pharmacology in Rmelan. Its language of instruction was Kurdish, and with an agreement with Paris 8 University in France for cooperation, the university opened registration for students in the academic year 2016–2017.
- In August 2016, Jazira Canton police forces took control of the remaining parts of Hasakah city, which included the Hasakah campus of the Arabic-language Al-Furat University, and with mutual agreement the institution continued to be operated under the authority of the Damascus government's Ministry of Higher Education.

=== Health ===
Healthcare was organized through the region's "Health and Environment Authority" and through sub-region- and canton-level Health Committees. Independent organizations providing healthcare in the region included the Kurdish Red Crescent, the Syrian American Medical Society, the Free Burma Rangers and Doctors Without Borders. The 2019 Turkish offensive left thousands of people in the region without access to basic necessities, as the majority of international aid groups withdrew during the violence.

== Culture ==
=== Arts ===
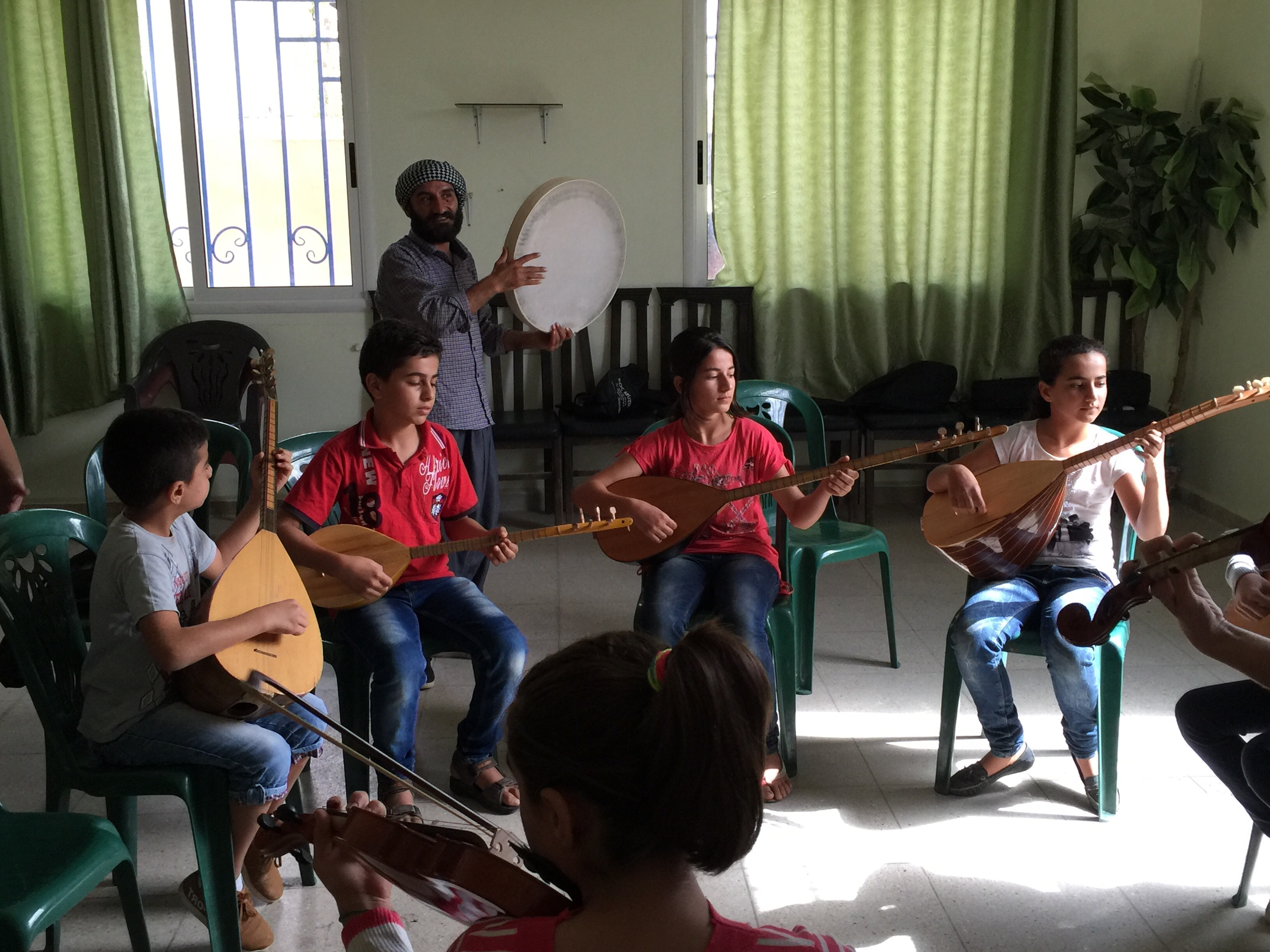
Children learning to play instruments and arts

After the establishment of the de facto autonomous region, the Center of Art and Democratic Culture, located in Jazira Region, became a venue for aspiring artists who showcased their work. Among the major cultural events in the region were the annual Festival of Theater in March/April and the Rojava Short Story Festival in June, both held in the city of Qamishli, as well as the Afrin Short Film Festival in April.

=== Media ===
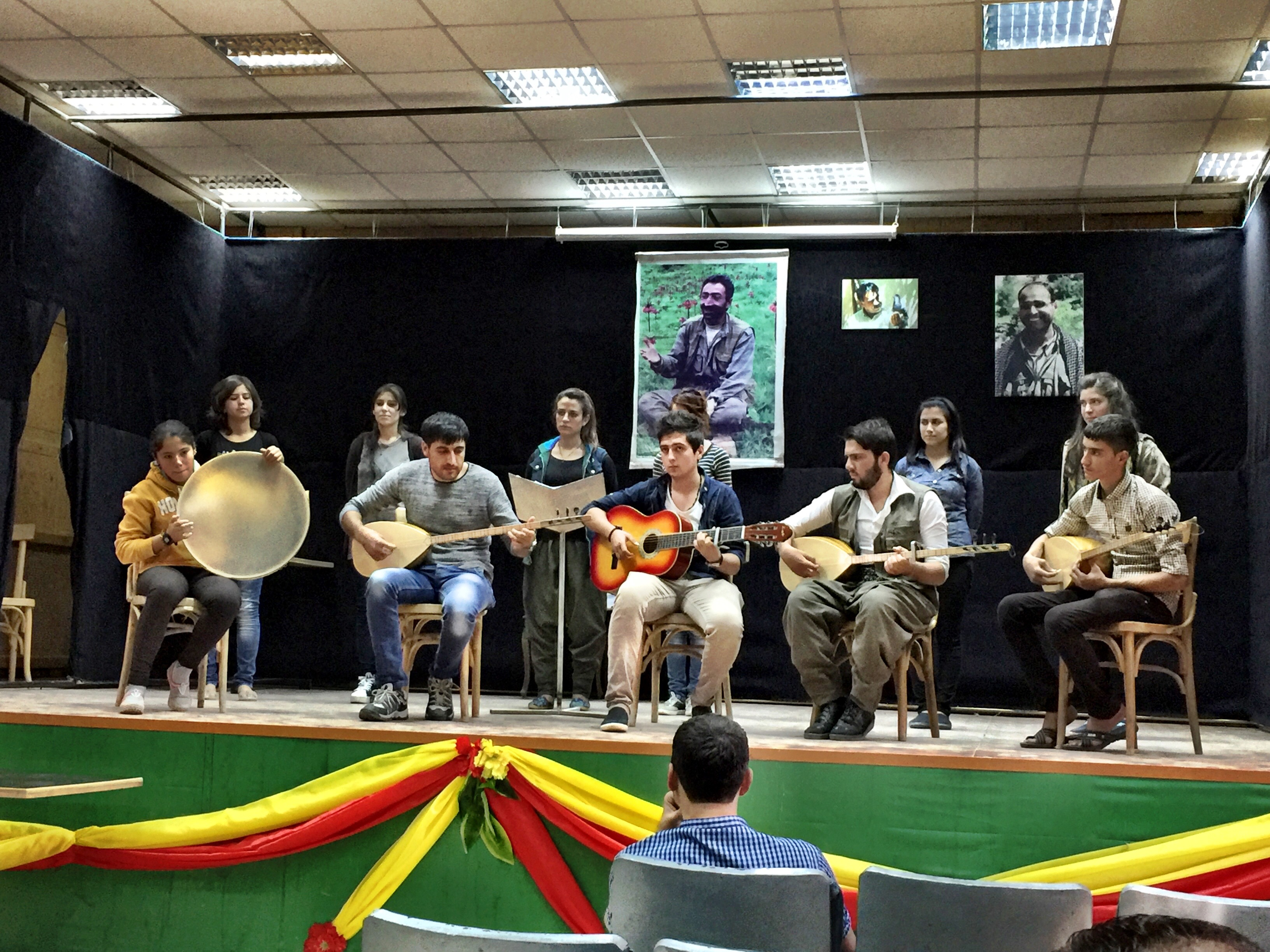
Public performance

Incorporating the Universal Declaration of Human Rights, the International Covenant on Civil and Political Rights, the International Covenant on Economic, Social and Cultural Rights, as well as other internationally recognized human rights conventions, the 2014 Constitution of North and East Syria guaranteed freedom of speech and freedom of the press. As a result, a diverse media landscape developed in the region, in each of the Kurdish, Arabic, Syriac-Aramaic and Turkish languages of the land, as well as in English, and media outlets frequently used more than one language. Among the most prominent media in the region were Hawar News Agency and ARA News agencies and websites, as well as TV outlets Rojava Kurdistan TV, Ronahî TV, and the bimonthly magazine Nudem. A landscape of local newspapers and radio stations developed. However, media agencies often faced economic pressure, as was demonstrated by the closure of news website Welati in May 2016. In addition, the autonomous regions imposed some limits on press freedom, for example by requiring the press to obtain work permits. These could be cancelled, thereby curtailing the ability of certain press agencies to operate. However, the extent of these restrictions differed greatly from area to area. By 2016, Kobani Canton was the least restrictive, followed by Jazira Canton, which closely monitored and occasionally regulated press activity. Afrin Canton was the most restrictive, and many local reporters operated anonymously.

Political extremism in the context of the Syrian Civil War could put media outlets under pressure; for example, in April 2016, the premises of Arta FM ("the first, and only, independent radio station staffed and broadcast by Syrians inside Syria") in Amuda were threatened and burned down by unidentified assailants. In December 2018, the Rojava Information Center was established. During the Turkish military operation in Afrin, the KDP-affiliated Iraqi Kurdish Rudaw Media Network was also banned from reporting in the region. On 2 September 2019, the Iraqi Kurdistan-based Kurdistan 24 network had its license to work in the region withdrawn and had its offices confiscated by Rojava authorities. International media and journalists operated with few restrictions in the region, making it one of the only regions in Syria where they could operate with some degree of freedom. Internet connections in the region were often slow due to inadequate infrastructure. Internet lines were operated by Syrian Telecom, which as of January 2017 was working on a major extension of the fibre optic cable network in southern Jazira Region.

== See also ==
- Zapatista territories
