= Foreign relations of the Democratic Autonomous Administration of North and East Syria =

External relations of the self-proclaimed autonomous region of Rojava

The foreign relations of the Democratic Autonomous Administration of North and East Syria (DAANES), commonly referred to as Rojava, during its existence from 2012 until its integration into the Syrian state in 2026, consisted of its relationships with foreign countries and international organizations. The DAANES, consisting of two internal regions (Euphrates and Jazira), was formed in early 2014 in the context of the Syrian Civil War, a conflict that led to the involvement of numerous countries and international organizations in the region.

The Constitution of the Democratic Autonomous Administration of North and East Syria, which defines the autonomous region as an integral part of Syria and not a separate country, states that "the Autonomous Regions shall not interfere in the domestic affairs of other countries, and it shall safeguard its relations with neighboring states, resolving any conflicts peacefully." It also mandates, among other executive council bodies, a Body of Foreign Relations.

== Relations ==
=== Relations with international civil society ===
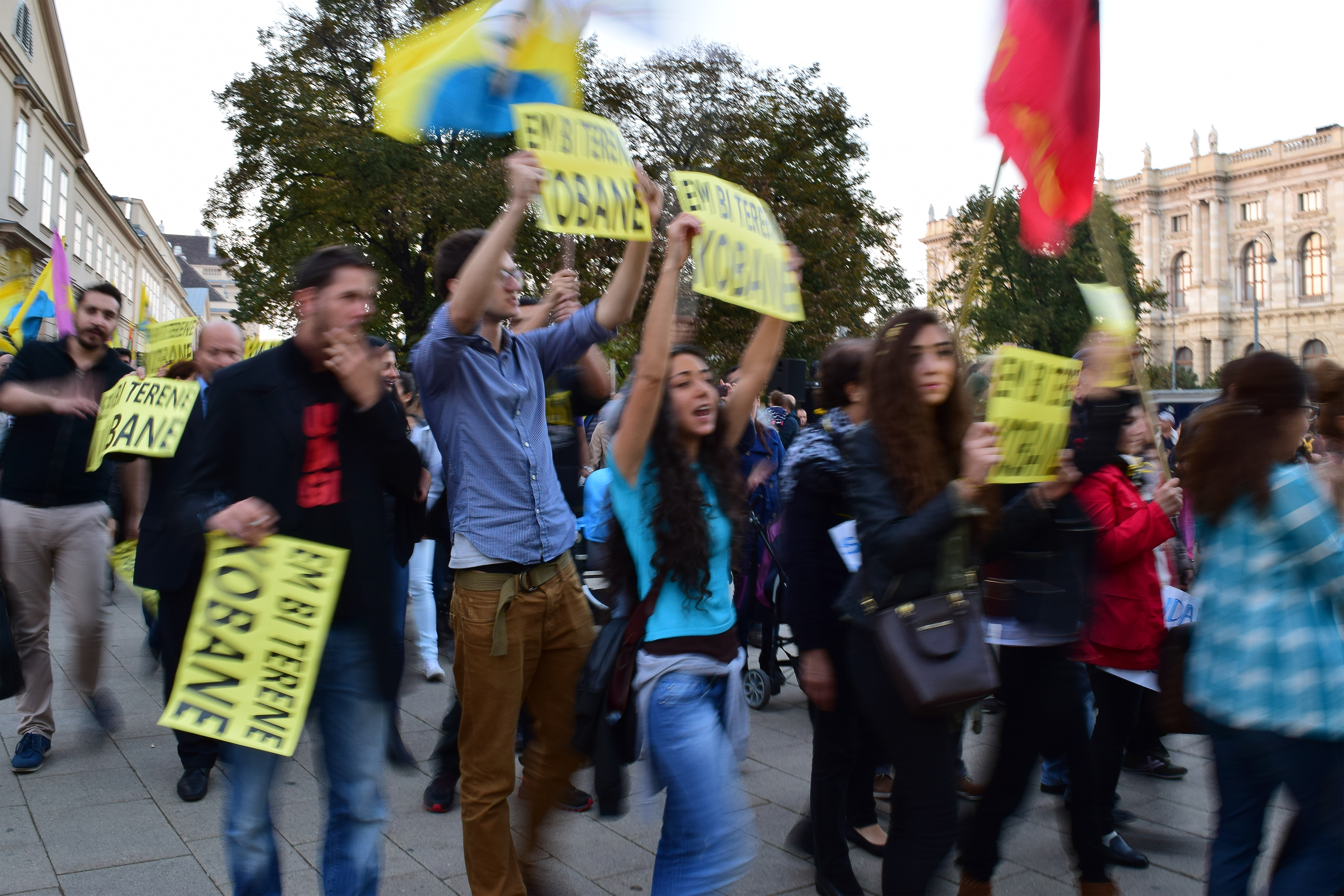
Demonstration for solidarity with Rojava, in Vienna, 2014

The socio-political transformations of the "Rojava Revolution" have inspired much attention in international media, both in mainstream media and in dedicated progressive leftist media.

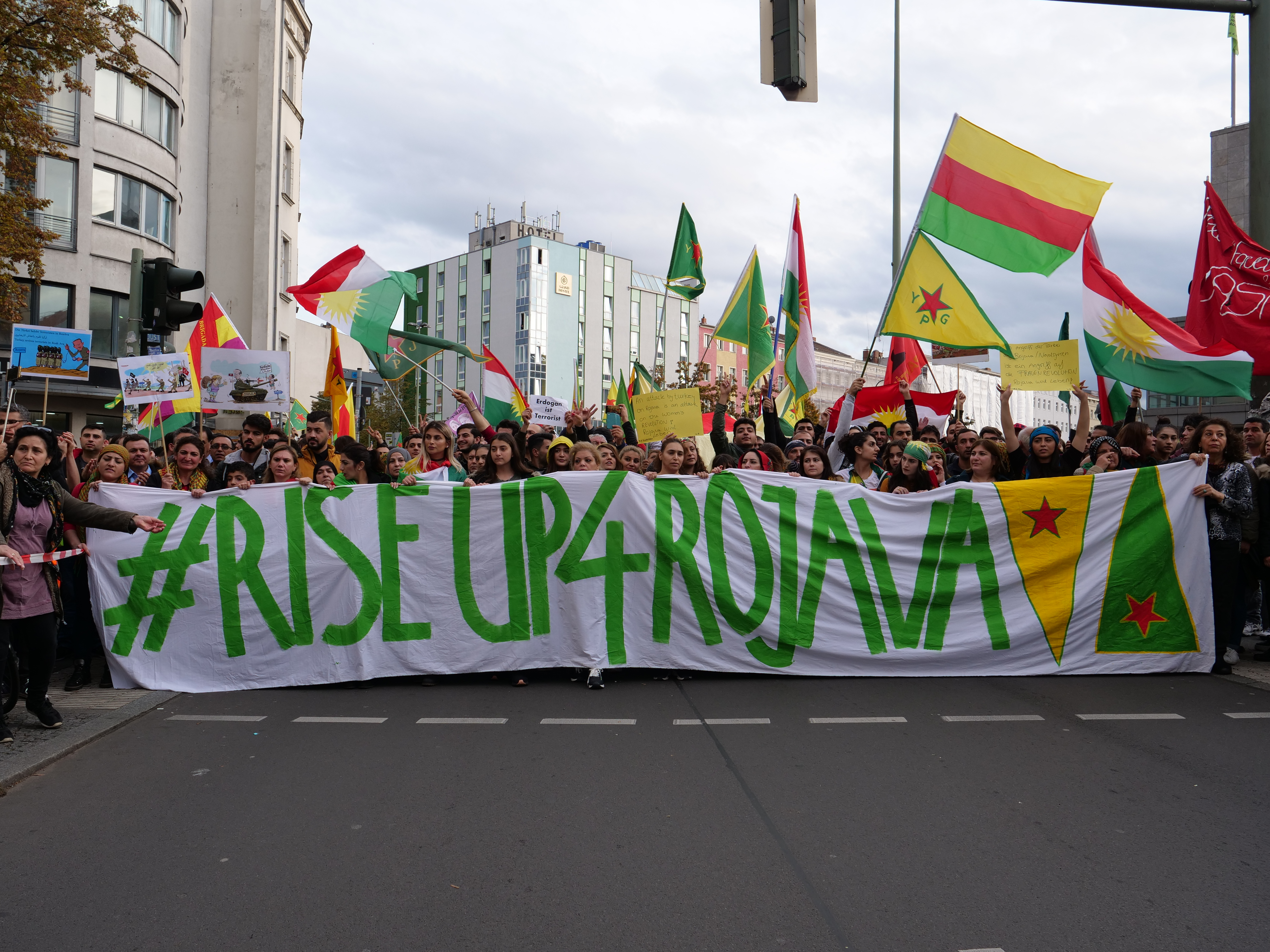
International march in solidarity with Rojava and Northern Syria

Among the early established international non-governmental organizations (NGOs) active in the autonomous region are Handicap International and DanChurchAid, while many established NGOs are deterred by the aggressive Turkish embargo policy. However, there are numerous purpose-built initiatives of international support for the DAANES and the people within its boundaries, as well as a considerable number of freelance volunteers. The international volunteers with the People's Defense Units (YPG) self-defence militia have been widely reported on, as to a lesser extent have the international volunteers with the infrastructure-building initiative.

By 2017, Turkish deterrence against international civil society engagement in the autonomous region has been breaking down. From September 2017, Médecins Sans Frontières operates the National Hospital in al-Hasakah, which had been abandoned by the Syrian government.

A number of international NGOs help to support huge number of refugees who have fled to Rojava from other parts of Syria or from Iraq, while trying to keep a low profile for the aforementioned reason.

=== Relations with international organisations ===
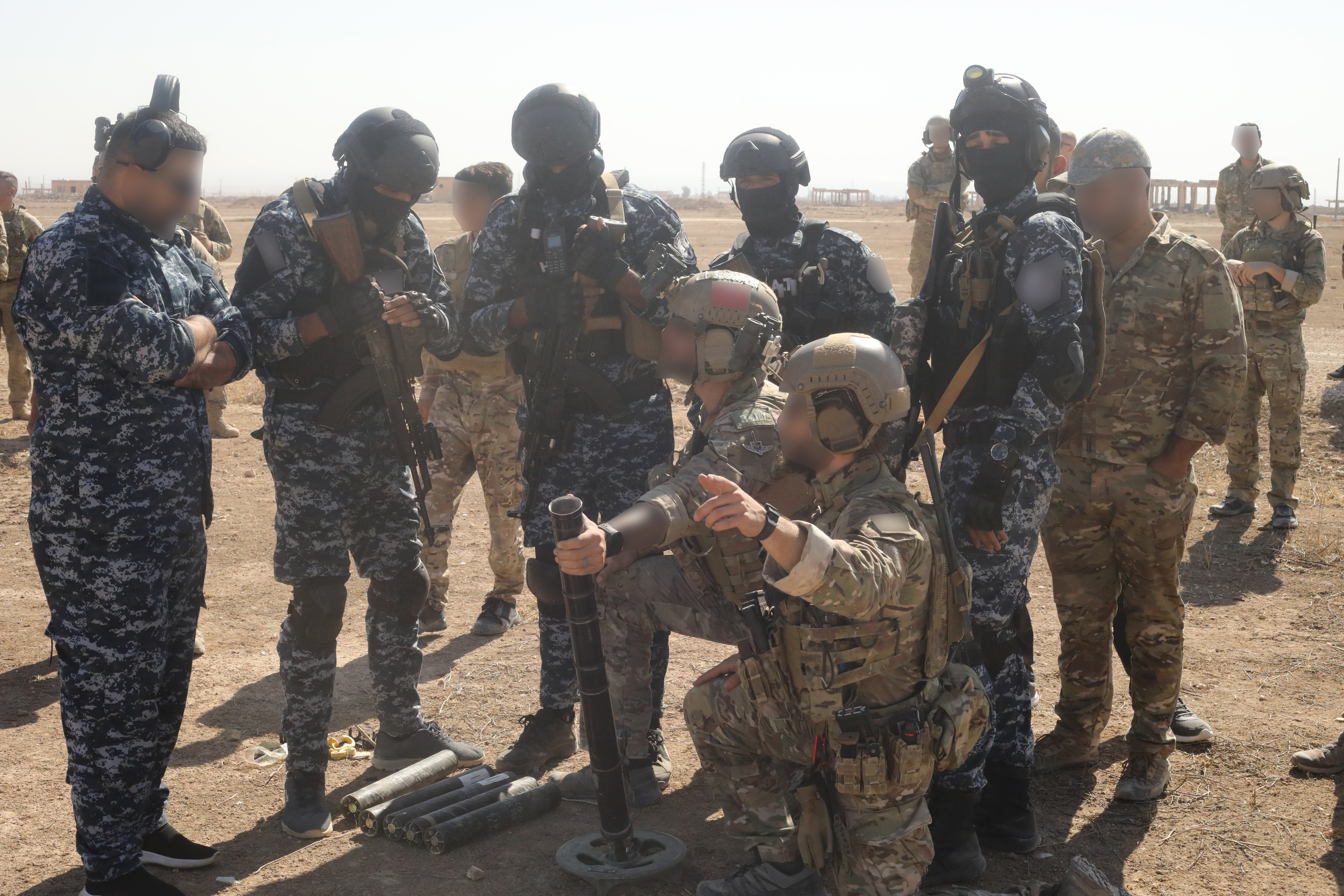
U.S. soldiers train Asayish Anti-Terror Forces (HAT) with mortars in eastern Syria, 29 September 2021

- CJTF–OIR – The US-led coalition against the Islamic State of Iraq and the Levant (ISIL) collaborates closely and comprehensively with the Syrian Democratic Forces (SDF).
- European Union – In July 2016, the European Parliament drew much political attention with a photo exhibition dedicated to the autonomous region. In September 2016, Democratic Union Party (PYD) co-chairperson Salih Muslim was invited to address the European Parliament.
- United Nations – While the administration of the autonomous region is not invited to the Geneva III peace talks on Syria, or any of the earlier talks, Russia, which calls for their inclusion, does to some degree carry their positions into the talks, as documented in Russia's May 2016 draft for a new constitution for Syria. On 6 June 2016, the PYD said that the United Nations Syria envoy Staffan de Mistura sent a detailed letter to the PYD leadership with an invitation to the next round of talks. The Office of the United Nations High Commissioner for Refugees (UNHCR) co-operates refugee camps for inbound Syrian and Iraqi refugees in the autonomous region, most notably the camp in Al-Hawl.

=== Relations with UN member states ===
- Albania – Albania is one of the main sources of weapons flowing to the People's Defense Units (YPG) in the autonomous region through the US-led coalition against the Islamic State of Iraq and the Levant.
- Belgium – In September 2016, the 8th conference of the autonomous region's leading Democratic Union Party (PYD) was held in Brussels. 500 PYD members, including its leaders, and many others (including Abdul Rahman Haji Ahmadi) attended.
- Czech Republic – The YPG opened an official representation office in Prague in April 2016. The relationship with the YPG in particular has been described as "amicable", and "Czech Defense Ministry and other officials are said to regularly hobnob with YPG cadres." The Czech Republic is one of the main sources of weapons flowing to the YPG through the US-led coalition against the Islamic State of Iraq and the Levant. The office was shut down in December 2016. Salih Muslim, then foreign relations official of the Movement for a Democratic Society (TEV-DEM) coalition, was briefly detained at Turkey's request on 25 February 2018 in Prague, the capital of the Czech Republic, but was released two days later, drawing angry protests from Turkey. On 17 March 2018, the Czech authorities dismissed Turkey's request.
- Finland – According to Suomen Kuvalehti magazine, Finland is planning on giving the autonomous region support for developing government and rebuilding infrastructure. In 2022, in negotiations with Turkey over Sweden and Finland's bid to join NATO, Finland pledged to not provide support to the Kurdistan Workers' Party(PKK), People's Protection Units(YPG) or to the Democratic Union Party(PYD) along with pledges to lift the arms embargo they had placed on Turkey over their incursion in Northern Syria, and to co-operate with Turkey in the extradition of Kurdish refugees suspected to have links to the PKK, PYD and YPG.
- France – In May 2016, the administration of the autonomous region opened a representation office in Paris. In February 2015, President Francois Hollande met with the PYD co-leader Asya Abdullah and the Women's Protection Units (YPJ) commander Nesrin Abdullah in the Élysée Palace. French Special Operations Command Forces are supporting the Syrian Democratic Forces in operations. In August 2016, a French delegation and the People's Municipality Board in the autonomous region signed a contract to open a center in the Kurdish and French languages in order to bring the cultures of the autonomous region and France together, and the opening of a branch of the Paris 8 University in the autonomous region was also discussed. In May 2017, Hollande received the co-chairman of the PYD, Salih Muslim, for talks on the Syria situation. On 29 March 2018, French President Emmanuel Macron vowed to send troops to Syria's Manbij in a bid to assist local Syrian Democratic Forces militias in preventing Turkish forces from advancing on the town.

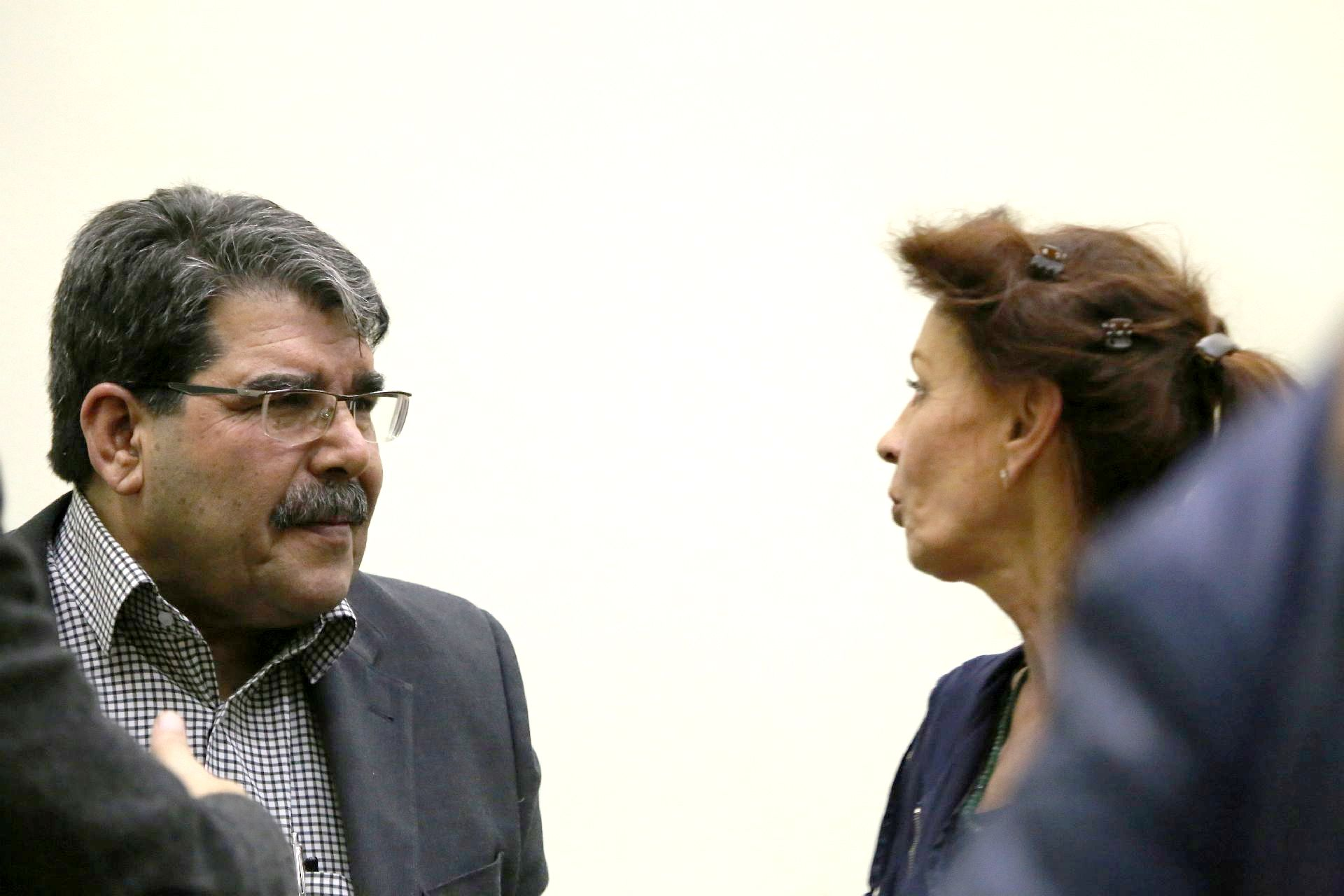
Salih Muslim, then co-chairman of the PYD, with Ulla Jelpke at Rosa Luxemburg Foundation in Berlin

- Germany – In May 2016, the administration of the autonomous region opened a representation office in Berlin. In August 2016, Foreign Minister Frank-Walter Steinmeier condemned Turkish attacks against the Syrian Democratic Forces and pointed out that Turkey has to join the war against the Islamic State of Iraq and the Levant (ISIL), "not to fight Syrian Kurds".
- Greece – The co-chairman of the PYD, Salih Muslim, has been an official guest of Greek prime minister Alexis Tsipras' governing Syriza party at their congress in October 2016. In February 2016, Muslim attended the Öcalan Conference in Athens.
- Iraq – (Kurdistan Region) Iraqi Kurdistan – The autonomous region shares much culturally with Iraqi Kurdistan, an autonomous region of Iraq, but has many political differences. There has been military cooperation with Iraqi Kurdistan and the United States in the conflict against ISIL, although neither gives official support for the autonomous region or the YPG. The Kurdistan Regional Government, which the Kurdistan Democratic Party runs, is an ally of Turkey and has co-operated to enforce a unilateral economic blockade against Rojava which has damaged and limited the autonomous region's economy. The "Sultanistic system" of Iraqi Kurdistan stands in stark contrast to the democratic confederalist system of the autonomous region.
- Myanmar – Ethnic rebel groups – In November 2023 the general command of YPG and YPJ issued a letter of support to "all honorable Myanmar revolutionaries" in their fight against the "fascist military junta". The message emphasized shared ideals of democracy, women’s liberation, and self-defense.
- Israel – In March 2025, following the 2024 Syrian opposition offensives and the fall of the Assad regime, Syrian Democratic Forces leader Mazloum Abdi publicly expressed openness towards Israeli support in guaranteeing Kurdish security interests.
- Italy – In June 2015, YPJ commander Nesrin Abdullah was invited to speak in the Italian parliament. In July 2016, the co-chairperson of the PYD, Asya Abdullah, held talks with a number of senior government officials in Rome.
- Japan – In April 2017, a delegation from the Autonomous Administration of North and East Syria made a 6-day visit to Tokyo. The delegation includes co-chairman of Constituent Council of the Autonomous Administration of North and East Syria Hediya Yousef, the spokeswoman of Kongreya Star Avin Siwed, head of the Kurdish National Alliance in Syria Mustafa Mashayikh, and member of Kurdish National Congress's Executive Council Rafiq Jaifar.
- Netherlands – In September 2016, the administration of the autonomous region opened a representation office in The Hague.
- Norway – In November 2016, the city of Oslo in its City Hall hosted a "New World Embassy" event dedicated to the autonomous region, "After Belonging", bringing representatives from the autonomous region together with international politicians, diplomats, academics, journalists, students, artists, and more.
- Russia – In February 2016, the administration of the autonomous region opened a representation office in Moscow amid growing ties between Russia and the autonomous region. Russia has lent support to the autonomous region in the diplomatic arena, in particular more clearly than any other country calling for its inclusion in the Geneva III peace talks on Syria, and to some degree carrying their positions into the talks, as documented in Russia's May 2016 draft for a new constitution for Syria. In the course of 2017, representatives of the YPG appeared with representatives of the Russian military on Russian military bases in Syria, sporting the flags of both Russia and the YPG. As of late 2017, a delegation of the Autonomous Administration of North and East Syria has been invited to attend the Syrian National Dialogue Congress in Sochi in February 2018.
- Spain – Catalonia – In July 2014 the PYD co-chair Salih Muslim was invited by the Catalan Parliament in Barcelona to explain the democratic process in the autonomous region. He met with the president of the Parliament, Núria de Gispert, and representatives of four major Catalan parties.
- Sweden – In April 2016, the administration of the autonomous region opened a representation office in Stockholm. In 2022, in negotiations with Turkey over Sweden and Finland's bid to join NATO, Sweden pledged to not provide support to the Kurdistan Workers' Party(PKK), People's Protection Units(YPG) or to the Democratic Union Party(PYD) along with pledges to lift the arms embargo they had placed on Turkey over their incursion in Northern Syria, and to co-operate with Turkey in the extradition of Kurdish refugees suspected to have links to the PKK, PYD and YPG.

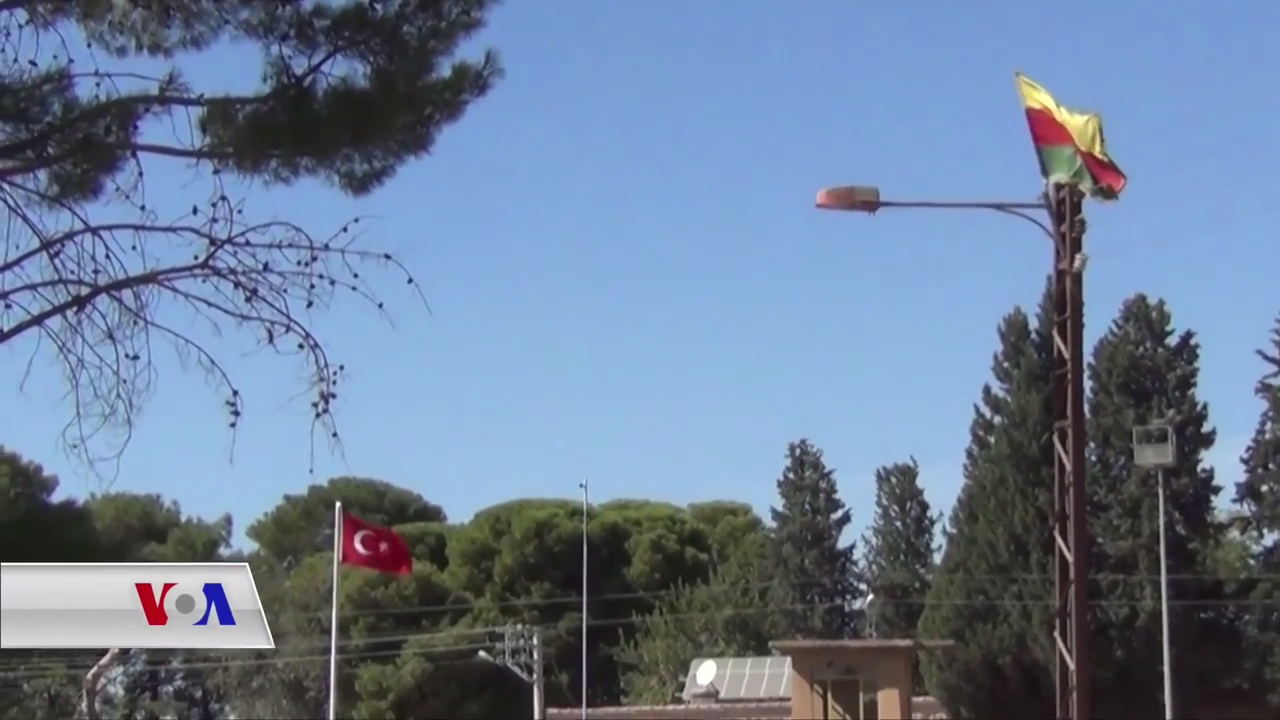
Flags of Rojava and Turkey at a border crossing in northern Syria

- Turkey – Neighbouring Turkey has received PYD co-chair Salih Muslim for talks in 2013 and in 2014, even entertaining the idea of opening a representation office for the autonomous region in Ankara "if it's suitable with Ankara's policies." Nonwithstanding, Turkey is persistently hostile, because it feels threatened by the autonomous region's emergence encouraging activism for autonomy among Kurds in Turkey and the Kurdish–Turkish conflict, and in this context in particular the autonomous region's leading Democratic Union Party (PYD) and the YPG militia being members of the Kurdistan Communities Union (KCK) network of organisations, which also includes both political and militant assertively Kurdish organizations in Turkey itself, including the Kurdistan Workers' Party (PKK). Turkey's policy towards the autonomous region is based on an economic blockade, persistent attempts of international isolation, opposition to the cooperation of the international Anti-ISIL-coalition with the militias of the autonomous region, and support of Islamist Syrian Civil War parties hostile towards the autonomous region, in past times even including ISIL. Turkey has on several occasions also been militarily attacking the territory of the autonomous region and defence forces. The latter has resulted in some of the most clearcut instances of international solidarity with the autonomous region. In the perception of much of the Turkish public, the federal project of the autonomous region as well as U.S. support for the YPG against ISIL are elements of a wider conspiracy scheme by a "mastermind" with the aim to weaken or even dismember Turkey, in order to prevent its imminent rise as a global power. Kurdish opposition party leader Selahattin Demirtaş has argued for Turkey and other countries to recognize the autonomous region and work with it as a partner.
- United Kingdom – In January 2015, a British Parliament committee asked the government of Prime Minister David Cameron to explain and justify its policy of not working with the autonomous region's military in combating ISIL. In July 2015, the Foreign and Commonwealth Office formally declared that "the UK has engaged with Saleh Muslim, co-leader of the Democratic Union Party (PYD)". Since then, United Kingdom Special Forces are supporting the Syrian Democratic Forces in operations. Democratic Union Party (PYD) co-chairperson Salih Muslim was invited to speak in the British Parliament Parliament in 2015 and in 2016.

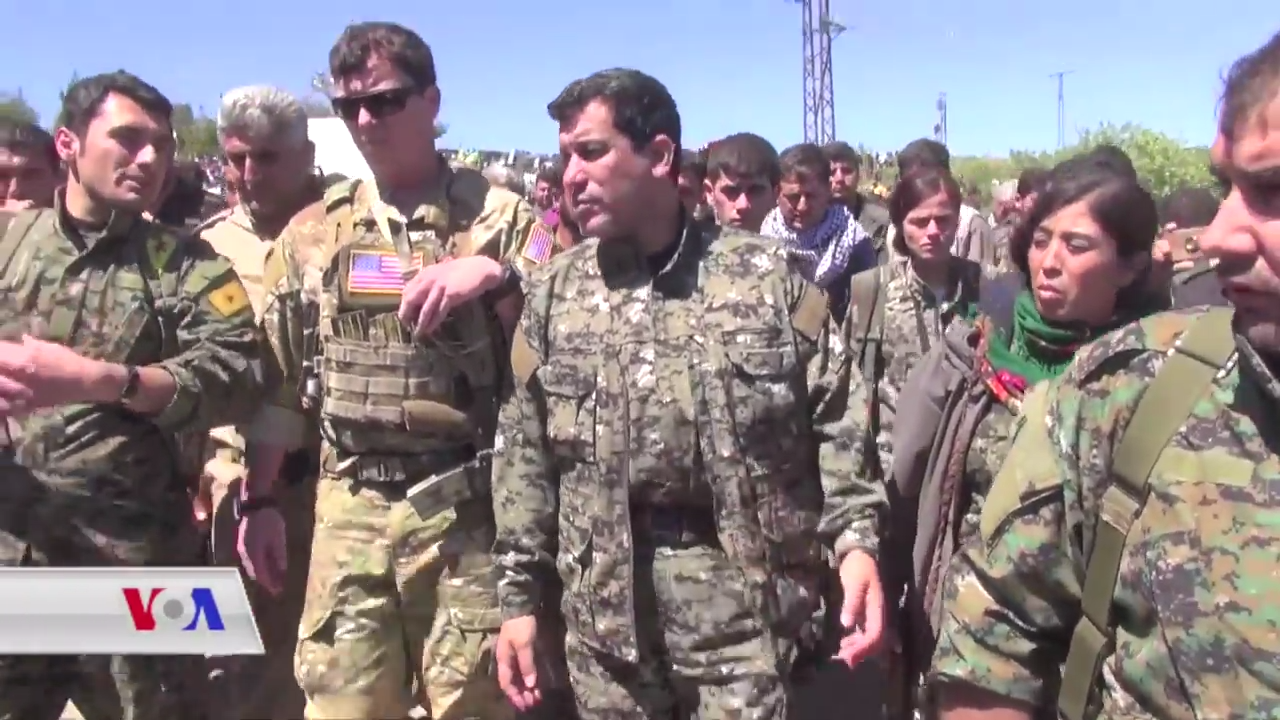
Rojava's People's Protection Units and Women's Protection Units cooperate with Special Operations Forces of the U.S. and other nations in the fight against ISIL

- United States – The U.S. Department of State announced limited support for the PYD in February 2016, although it opposes the unilateral establishment of a federal region in northern Syria. In March 2016, the day after the declaration of the Autonomous Administration of North and East Syria, U.S. Defense Secretary Ashton Carter praised the YPG militia as having "proven to be excellent partners of ours on the ground in fighting ISIL. We are grateful for that, and we intend to continue to do that, recognizing the complexities of their regional role." The USA have usually supported the YPG militia in its fight against ISIL, both with air support in combat and with embedded US Special Forces. During the Northern Raqqa offensive (May 2016), US Special Operation Forces were widely reported and photographed taking part, wearing YPG and YPJ badges on their uniforms. When in June 2016 the Manbij offensive started, the Washington Post reported it under the headline of "Ignoring Turkey, U.S. backs Kurds in drive against ISIS in Syria". On 7 November 2016, when asked about the federalization of Syria, Mark C. Toner, the Deputy Spokesperson for the US Department of State, said "We don't want to see any kind of ad hoc federalism or federalist system arise. We don't want to see semi-autonomous zones. The reality is, though, as territory is liberated from Daesh, you got to get some kind of governance back into these areas, but by no means are we condoning or – any kind of, as I said, ad hoc semi-autonomous areas in northern Syria". According to lieutenant general Stephen J. Townsend of the United States Army in an interview on 29 March 2017, the US does not recognize the autonomous region as a "Kurdish state" but instead sees it as a "multi-cultural, multi-party, multi-ethnic, multi-sectarian Syrian region being liberated from ISIS." Effective 31 January 2018, the Syrian Democratic Council (SDC) is registered in the US as a "foreign political party" under the Foreign Agents Registration Act.

== Foreign relations of administrative divisions ==
Seal of the Jazira Region's Foreign Relations Board

=== Jazira Region ===
In August 2016, the newly founded University of Rojava in Qamishli, established by the Jazira Region Board of Education, concluded an agreement with Paris 8 University in France for cooperation.

In 2016, talks about the establishment of a French cultural centre in the town of Amuda began.

=== Euphrates Region ===
In April 2015, the municipality of Rome, capital of Italy, recognised the municipality of Kobani as a sister city.

In September 2016, the Kurdish Red Crescent opened a hospital in Kobanî, their first hospital in the Euphrates Region. Many international organizations had given a helping hand as well as sending them special medical equipment, UNICEF and Doctors Without Borders in particular.

=== Afrin Region ===
YPG spokesman Redur Xelil stated on 20 March 2017 that Russia will train Kurdish fighters under an agreement in which it will also set up a military base near Afrin. Russian troops and armored vehicles were reported to have been spotted around Afrin. Russia however denied any such deal was made, stating it had no plans to create additional military bases in Syria and adding that only a section of its reconciliation centre was located in Aleppo Governorate near Afrin for the prevention of ceasefire violations.

== See also ==
- DAANES–Syria relations
- YPG–FSA relations
