= List of political parties in the Democratic Autonomous Administration of North and East Syria =

This was a list of political parties in the Democratic Autonomous Administration of North and East Syria. The Democratic Autonomous Administration of North and East Syria had a political system based on direct democracy and multi-party aspirations, with different levels of government: self-governing municipalities and communes, self-governing autonomous regions and provinces, and the autonomous region as a whole.

There had been two elections in the region: one for the communes and municipalities and another for the regions and provinces in 2017, while the third federation-level election for the Syrian Democratic Council was delayed.

== Political parties in Rojava ==
=== Parties ===
The following parties are represented either in the Syrian Democratic Assembly as of September 2016 or in cantonal parliaments:

Party		Alliance				Members in				Political Position
Abbr.	Name	Abbr.	Name	W	Leader	FC	FA	Cantons	Members	(Ideology)
QMH	Law–Citizenship–Rights Movement; Wheat Wave Movement Teyar El-Qemih	?	?	?	Haytham Manna	1	3	?	?	Secularism; Nonsectarianism
SUP	Syriac Union Party	TEV-DEM	Movement for a Democratic Society		Ishow Gowriye	1	3	?	?	Assyrian/Syriac Interests Syrian federalism Dawronoye
TWDS	Syrian National Democratic Alliance; Syrian National Democratic Coalition		?		Alaeddine Khaled	1	4	?	?	Pluralist democracy Feminism Democratic confederalism
CDR	Honor and Rights Convention			?	Meram Dawûd	1	2	?	?	Secularism; Democratic confederalism Communalism
YS	Kongreya Star	TEV-DEM	Movement for a Democratic Society		Rojîn Remo	1	1	?	?	Democracy Feminism
ANC	Arab National Coalition	?	?	?	Ehmed El-Hebîb	1	1	?	?	Arab Interests
PDK-S	Kurdistan Democratic Party of Syria	ENKS	Kurdish National Council		Saud Malla	1	1	?	?	Kurdish nationalism Kurdish autonomy Liberal democracy Traditionalism
PYD	Democratic Union Party	TEV-DEM	Movement for a Democratic Society		Salih Muslim; Asya Abdullah	0	3	?	?	Democratic confederalism Libertarian socialism Jineology; Communalism
SDS	Syrian Democratic Society	TM	Syria's Tomorrow Movement; Tayar Alghad Alsoury		Ziyad El-Asî	0	1	?	?	Pluralist democracy
DM	Democratic Modernity Party			?	Ebilqadir El-Miwehed	0	1	?	?	led by Fîras Qesas
PB-ASD	Democratic Socialist Arab Ba'ath Party; Democratic Socialist Party	KDCK	Assembly for Democracy and the Left	?	Brahim Makhous	0	1	?	?	Neo-Ba'athism; Democratic socialism Jadidism; Anti-Assadism
LPSK	Left Party of Syrian Kurds	KDCK	Assembly for Democracy and the Left	?	Mihmedê Mûsê	0	1	?	?	Centre-left; Kurdish Nationalism
ANC	Arab National Coalition		?	?	Hikmet Hebîb	0	1	?	?	Arab Interests; Regionalism
KDPP / PDPKS	Kurdish Democratic Progressive Party				Abd al-Hamid Darwish	0	1	?	?	Federalism Kurdish nationalism Socialism
ADP	Assyrian Democratic Party				Ninos Isho	0	1	?	?	Eastern Assyrian interests Syrian-Assyrian self-determination Christian politics Social democracy
PADK	Kurdistan Democratic Peace Party	TEV-DEM	Movement for a Democratic Society		Talal Muhammad (Abduselam Mihemed)	0	1	?	?	Democratic confederalism Communalism
DT	Democratic Transformation Party				Mizgîn Zêdan	0	1	?	?	?
PYLK	Kurdistan Liberal Union Party	TEV-DEM	Movement for a Democratic Society		Ferhad Têlo	0	1	?	?	?
Wifaq	Kurdish Democratic Accord Party; Al Wifaq Party	HNKS	Kurdish National Alliance in Syria	?	Fewzî Şengalî	0	1	?	?	Centre-right; Kurdish Nationalism
Îslah	Syrian Reform Movement; Al-Îslah Party	HNKS	Kurdish National Alliance in Syria	?	Emcet Osman	0	1	?	?	Reformism
Êzîdî	Yazidi House; Mala Êzîdiyan			?	Faris Eto Şemo	0	1	?	?	Yazidi Interests
SNC	Syriac National Council			?	Bassam Said Ishak	0	1	?	?	Assyrian Interests
PI	Patriotic Initiative	HNKS	Kurdish National Alliance in Syria		Cebel El-Ereb	0	1	?	?	Populism
Total						9*	43*	?	?	

Notes: * including independents

=== Minor parties ===
The following groups or parties are not represented at either the cantonal or federal level (but may hold positions in municipal parliaments).

Party		Alliance				Political Position
Abbr.	Name	Abbr.	Name	W	Leader	(Ideology)
KOM	Communist Party of Kurdistan	TEV-DEM	Movement for a Democratic Society			Communism; Left-wing; Anti-capitalism
KNK	National Assembly of Kurdistan	TEV-DEM	Movement for a Democratic Society			Left-wing
N-PDKS	New Kurdistan Democratic Party in Syria	TEV-DEM	Movement for a Democratic Society			Left-wing
KESK	Green Party of Kurdistan	KDCK	Assembly for Democracy and the Left	?	?	Environmentalism
PGD	Change Party; Democratic Change Party	KDCK	Assembly for Democracy and the Left	?	?	Progressivism
KED	Kurdistan Workers Party	KDCK	Assembly for Democracy and the Left	?	?	Trade Unionism
PCKS	Kurdish Left Party	KDCK	Assembly for Democracy and the Left	?	?	Left-wing
TNK	Booster Movement of Kurdistan	KDCK	Assembly for Democracy and the Left	?	?	Left-wing
PYDKS	Kurdish Democratic Unity Party	HNKS	Kurdish National Alliance in Syria	Website [1] Website [2] Website [3]	Şêx Alî (Sheikh Ali)	Liberalism Secularism Kurdish nationalism Federalism
PDKSI	Kurdish Democratic Party in Syria	HNKS	Kurdish National Alliance in Syria	?	Nesiredîn Îberahîm	?
PYÇŞ	Yekiti Kurdistan Party – Syria ("The First Party with four branches"); Partiya Yeketî bi çar şaxên wê	ENKS	Kurdish National Council	?	?	Kurdish nationalism Traditionalism
ŞPKS	Kurdish Future Movement in Syria	ENKS	Kurdish National Council		Siamend Hajo	Kurdish nationalism Liberalism
PYDK	Kurdistan Democratic Union Party	ENKS	Kurdish National Council		Faslah Youssef (فصلة يوسف, elected March 8–9, 2019)	
TAA	Syria's Tomorrow Movement	TM	Syria's Tomorrow Movement		Fouad Humeira; Ahmad Jarba	Pluralist democracy Liberal democracy Secularism
SRLC	Syrian Revolutionary Left Current	TWDS	Syrian National Democratic Alliance			Trotskyism; Democratic socialism Participatory democracy Secularism
MLKP Rojava	Marxist–Leninist Communist Party (Rojava)	HBDH	Peoples' United Revolutionary Movement			Hoxhaism; Anti-Revisionism
TKEP/L	Communist Labour Party of Turkey/Leninist	HBDH	Peoples' United Revolutionary Movement			Marxism–Leninism–Maoism
TKP/ML	Communist Party of Turkey/Marxist–Leninist	HBDH	Peoples' United Revolutionary Movement			Marxism–Leninism–Maoism
ADO	Assyrian Democratic Organization				Gabriel Moushe Gawrieh	Assyrian Interests
DCP	Democratic Conservative Party					Conservatism Economic liberalism Anti-racism

== Relative importance of the five party alliances ==
Party	Number of elected representatives at the federal, cantonal and communal levels
TEV-DEM	8
HNKS	3
KDCK	2
ENKS	2
TM	1

== Historical parties and alliances ==
=== Historical parties ===
Name	Ideology	Active	Continued as
Mustafa Khidr Oso's Kurdish Freedom Party in Syria	Kurdish Nationalism	2014	Kurdistan Democratic Party of Syria
Mustafa Juma's Kurdish Freedom Party in Syria	Kurdish Nationalism	2014	Kurdistan Democratic Party of Syria
Kurdish Democratic Political Union	Kurdish Nationalism	2013	Kurdistan Democratic Party of Syria
Kurdish Union Party in Syria (PYKS)	Kurdish Nationalism	2012	
Syrian National Resistance (SNR)	Syrian nationalism, Anti-Turkism, democracy	2016–17	dissolved

=== Historical alliances ===
Name	Ideology	Active	Continued as
Kurdish Supreme Committee	Kurdish Nationalism	2013	discontinued

== Names in the national languages ==
Abbr.	Party	Northern Kurdish (Latin script)	Arabic	Syriac	Romanized Arabic
QMH	Wheat Wave Movement	Tevgera Hiqûq - Hemwelatîbûyîn - Mafan	تيار قمح	?	Teyar El-Qemih
SUP	Syriac Union Party	Partiya Yekîtiya Suryanî	حزب الإتحاد السرياني في سورية	ܓܒܐ ܕܚܘܝܕܐ ܣܘܪܝܝܐ ܒܣܘܪܝܐ	
TWDS	Syrian National Democratic Alliance	Koalisyona Niştîmanî Demokratî Sûrî	التحالف الوطني الديمقراطي السوري	?	?
CDR	Honor and Rights Convention	Kombûna Rûmet û Mafnasiyê	تجمع عهد الكرامة والحقوق	?	?
YS	Yekîtiya Star	Yekîtiya Star	?	?	
ANC	Arab National Coalition	Desteya Niştîmanî ya Erebî	?		?
PDK-S	Kurdistan Democratic Party of Syria	Partiya Demokrat a Kurdistanê li Sûriyê	حزب الديمقراطي کوردستان في سوريا		
PYD	Democratic Union Party	Partiya Yekîtiya Demokrat	حزب الاتحاد الديمقراطي	?	
SDS	Syrian Democratic Society	Kombûna Demokratîk a Sûriyeyê			
PB-ASD	Democratic Socialist Arab Ba'ath Party	Partiya Baas Demokratîk Sosyalîsa El-Erebî	حزب البعث الديمقراطي العربي الاشتراكي		?
DM	Syrian Democratic Society	Partiya Modern û Demokratîk			
ADO	Assyrian Democratic Organisation		المنظمة الآثورية الديمقراطية	ܡܛܟܣܬܐ ܐܬܘܪܝܬܐ ܕܝܡܩܪܛܝܬܐ	
ADP	Assyrian Democratic Party	Partiya Asûrî ya Demokratîk			
TAA	Syria's Tomorrow Movement		تيار الغد السوري		Tayar Alghad Alsoury
PDPKS	Progressive Democratic Party	Partiya Demokrata Pêşverû ya Kurd li Sûriyê	?	?	
PYDKS	Kurdish Democratic Unity Party	Partiya Yekîtîya Demokrat a Kurd li Sûriyê	حزب الوحدة الديمقراطي الكردي في سوريا	?	Hizb alwahdat aldiymuqratiu alkurdiu fi Suria
PYKS	Kurdish Union Party in Syria	Partiya Yekîtî ya Kurd li Sûriyê	?	?	
PÇKS	Left Party of Syrian Kurds	Partiya Çepa Kurdî li Surîyê	?	?	
PÇDKS	Kurdish Left Party	Partiya Çepa Demokrata Kurdî li Suriyê	?	?	
ŞPKS	Kurdish Future Movement in Syria	Şepêla Pêşeroja Kurdî li Suriyê	?	?	
PAK	Kurdish Freedom Party	Partiya Azadî Kurdî li Sûriya	?	?	
PADK	Kurdistan Democratic Peace Party	Partîya Aştîya Demokrat ya Kurdistanê	حزب السلام الديمقراطي الكردستاني		

== See also ==
- Politics of Syria
- List of political parties by country

== Bibliography ==
- The Carter Center (27 February 2017). "Foreign Volunteers for the Syrian Kurdish Forces" (PDF). Carter Center. Atlanta.
