= Executive Council (Rojava) =

Political committee in Syria

Federal Executive Council
- Arabic: المجلس التنفيذي للفيدرالية; Kurdish: Encûmena Rêvebir a Federaliyê; Classical Syriac: ܡܘܬܒܐ ܣܘܥܪܢܝܐ ܕܦܕܪܐܠܝܘܬܐ

Overview
- Established: 2018
- Dissolved: 2026
- Polity: Democratic Autonomous Administration of North and East Syria
- Leader: Co-chairs
- Appointed by: Federal Assembly of the Syrian Democratic Council

The Federal Executive Council, or simply the Executive Council (Arabic: المجلس التنفيذي للفيدرالية, Kurdish: Encûmena Rêvebir a Federaliyê, Classical Syriac: ܡܘܬܒܐ ܣܘܥܪܢܝܐ ܕܦܕܪܐܠܝܘܬܐ, romanized: Mawtbo Suronoyo d'Federaloyotho) was the executive body of the Democratic Autonomous Administration of North and East Syria (DAANES) from 2018 until its integration into the Syrian state in 2026. It served as joint coordination committee that oversaw the implementation of policies developed by the Federal Assembly of the Syrian Democratic Council (SDC).

The DAANES administration itself, as well as each regional canton, had its own respective Executive Council, Legislative Council, and Justice Council. The regional Executive Councils set the budget for each canton, supervised the work of their subordinate commissions and offices, and submitted reports to the overarching Executive Council of the DAANES.

== Origins and history of the Executive Council ==
=== Council composition ===
Among other stipulations outlined is a quota of 40% for women's participation in government, as well as another quota for youth. In connection with a decision to introduce affirmative action for ethnic minorities, all governmental organizations and offices are based on a system with two co-chairs. Women can also voluntarily participate in periodic meetings that aim to discuss their own affairs.

=== Restructuring of the AANES in 2018 ===
After the restructuring of Rojava's political system on 6 September 2018, Berivan Khalid and Abdul Hamid al-Mahbash were elected co-chairs of the Executive Council of the DAANES.

==== Commissions ====
In the first meeting of the DAANES' Executive Council held on 3 October 2018 in Ayn Issa, co-chairs of the nine initial Commissions (also called Committee), which are part of the Executive Council, were elected:

- Interior Commissions: Ali Mustafa Hajo (علي مصطفى حجو) – Hevi (Hifi) Ibrahim Mustafa (هيفي ابراهيم مصطفى)
- Education Commissions: Kawthar Doko (Kuthar Duku, كوثر دوكو) - Rajab al-Meshlaf (رجب المشلف)
- Local Administration Commissions: Joseph (Juzif) Lahdo (جوزيف لحدو) - Media Bozan (Maydia Bouzan, ميديا بوزان)
- Economics and Agriculture Commissions: Salman Tawfiq al-Baroudo (سلمان توفيق البارودو) - Amal al-Khazim (أمل الخزيم)
- Finance Commissions: Walat Haj Ali (ولات حاج علي) - Salwa al-Sayid (سلوى السيد)
- Culture Commissions: Abdul Satar Shakagi (عبدالستار شكاغي) - Aisha Ali Rajab (عائشة علي رجب)
- Health and Environment Commissions: Dr. Jwan Mustafa (الدكتور جوان مصطفى) – Khetam Khalil al-Jeld (ختام خليل الجلد)
- Social Affairs Commissions: Farouq al-Mashi (فاروق الماشي) - Berivan Hasan (بيريفان حسن)
- Women's Commissions: Jihan Khadro (جيهان خضرو)

Sometime later (first publications in December), the former official spokeswoman of "Wrath of the Euphrates" campaign Jihan Sheikh Ahmed was elected co-chair of the Defense Commission, one of two special offices of the Executive Council (the second is the Self-defense Commission), whose forming was assumed shortly after the creation of the initial nine commissions.

Apart from the commissions of the larger DAANES' Executive Council and Cantons’ Executive Councils, smaller subdivisions such as districts, sub-districts, and communes also have their own commissions.

==== Offices ====
Besides the commissions, eight Offices are also part of the DAANES' Executive Council, but not of the regional. There are offices for the following tasks:

- Foreign Relations
- Oil and Natural Resources
- Humanitarian Affairs and Organizations
- Religions and Beliefs
- Defense Affairs
- Planning and Development
- Media
- Advisory

== Operation of the Executive Council ==
=== Decisions and responsibilities ===
The Council assists with coordination and collaboration between cantons in political, economic, social and cultural matters; particularly that of diplomatic and military matters. It also supervises and follows the work of federal Departments and Ministries.

=== Constitutional conventions ===
Due to the Executive Council's unique nature as a voluntary grand coalition of political opponents, its operation is subject to constitutional conventions.

== Members of the Executive Council ==
A list of members of some of the Executive Councils:

Name	Party	Alliance	Region	Portfolio
Îlham Ehmed	Democratic Union Party (PYD)	TEV-DEM/LND	N/A	Co-president
Mansur Selum	Democratic Union Party (PYD)	TEV-DEM/LND	N/A	Co-president
Ishow Gowriye	Syriac Union Party (SUP)	TEV-DEM/LND	Jazira	Minister of Religious Affairs
Meram Dawûd	Honor and Rights Convention	N/A	N/A	
Îbrahîm El-Hesen	Tel Abyad Turkmen Representative	N/A	Euphrates	
Rojîn Remo	Yekîtiya Star	TEV-DEM/LND	N/A	Minister of Women and Family Affairs
Hikmet Hebîb	Arab National Coalition	TEV-DEM/LND	N/A	
Bêrîvan Ehmed	Youth's Representative	N/A	N/A	Minister of Youth and Sport
Cemal Şêx Baqî	Kurdistan Democratic Party of Syria (PDK-S)	HNKS	N/A	
Salih El-Nebwanî	Law–Citizenship–Rights Movement (QMH)	N/A	N/A	
