= 2017 Rojava regional elections =

Elections in Syria

2017 Northern Syria regional elections
- December 1, 2017
- Turnout: 69%
	First party	Second party	Third party
Party	LND	HNKS / PYDKS	TWDS
Seats won	4621	152	8
- Regions and areas of the Democratic Federation of Northern Syria where the elections took place in red

The first Rojava regional elections were held on 1 December 2017. Local councils for the Jazira Region, Euphrates Region and Afrin Region were elected as well as for the subordinate cantons, areas and districts of the regions of Rojava. This followed the communal elections that were held on 22 September and was to be followed by a federal parliamentary election of the Syrian Democratic Council, the region's highest governing body, initially scheduled for January 2018, but was later indefinitely postponed.

== Preparations ==
The election was chiefly organized by the High Electoral Commission (Arabic: المفوضية العليا للانتخابات; Kurdish: Komseriya Bilind Ya Hilbijartinan; Classical Syriac: ܦܩܝܕܳܝܘܬ݂ܐ ܥܠܝܬܐ ܕܓܘܒܳܝ̈ܐ) of the Democratic Federation of Northern Syria.

Over 30 parties and entities with more than 5600 candidates competed for posts in the local councils of the three regions of the DFNS as well as for the region's subordinate cantons, areas and districts. There were 3048 candidates in the Jazira Region (with 102 rejected by the Electoral Commission), 1170 candidates in the Euphrates Region (with four candidates rejected) and 1502 candidates in the Afrin Region (with 48 candidates rejected). The Kurdish National Council (KNC) boycotted the elections. DFNS co-president Hediya Yousef called the boycott "irresponsible".

The Kurdistan Regional Government (KRG) sent 13 observers for the elections, among them Kurdistan Democratic Party politicians. This was seen by observers as an indication of an improvement of the previously poor relations between the DFNS and the KRG.

== Parties and electoral lists ==
There were two main electoral lists competing in the election, the Democratic Nation List (Arabic: قائمة الأمة الديمقراطية; Kurdish: Lîsta Netewa Demokratîk; Classical Syriac: ܩܝܡܬܐ ܕܐܘܡܬܐ ܕܝܡܩܪܛܝܬܐ), which consists of 18 parties, and the Kurdish National Alliance in Syria (Arabic: التحالف الوطني الكردي في سوريا; Kurdish: Hevbendiya Niştimanî a Kurdî li Sûriyê), which consists of four. In addition to these two electoral alliances, the Syrian National Democratic Alliance also ran. There was also a separate list of independent candidates.

The Democratic Nation List includes the Democratic Union Party (PYD), Modernity and Democracy Party of Syria (PNDS), Arab National Coalition, Kurdistan Democratic Party – Syria, Green Party of Kurdistan (Al-Khader Kurdistan Party), Liberal Union of Kurdistan, Syriac Union Party, Kurdish Left Party in Syria (PCKS), Kurdistan Democratic Change Party (PGDK), Kurdistan Renewal Movement, Syrian Kurdish Democratic Party, Democratic Peace Party of Kurdistan (PADK), Assyrian Democratic Party, National Rally of Kurdistan Party (PKNK), Free Patriotic Union of Syria (PYNAS), Democratic Conservative Party, Sun Party of Kurdistan (Roj Kurdish Party), and the Kurdish Brotherhood Party.

The Kurdish National Alliance in Syria includes the Kurdish Democratic Unity Party in Syria (Democratic Yekîtî - PYDKS), Kurdish Democratic Left Party in Syria (PCDKS), Kurdish Democratic Party in Syria (al-Party - PKDS) and the Syrian Kurdish Democratic Accord (Rêkeftin - al-Wefaq Party). The Syrian Reform Movement (TCKS) was originally a fifth member of the alliance that split from the Kurdish National Council party of the same name.

== Results ==
The turnout was reported to be 69% of eligible voters.

Jazira Region (A total of 2,902 seats)

- Democratic Nation List: 93,66%, 2,718 seats (out of 2,902 candidates running).
- Kurdish National Alliance in Syria: 1,38%, 40 seats (out of 99 candidates running).
- Independents: 4,96%, 144 seats (out of 267 candidates running).

Euphrates Region (A total of 954 seats)

- Democratic Nation List: 88,78%, 847 seats (out of 954 candidates running).
- Kurdish Democratic Unity Party in Syria (Democratic Yekîtî - PYDKS): 4,19%, 40 seats (out of 124 candidates running).
- Independents: 7,02%, 67 seats (out of 95 candidates running).

Afrin Region (A total of 1,176 seats)

- Democratic Nation List: 89,80%, 1,056 seats (out of 1,175 candidates running).
- Kurdish Democratic Unity Party in Syria (Democratic Yekîtî - PYDKS): 6,12%, 72 seats (out of 197 candidates running).
- Syrian National Democratic Alliance: 0,68%, 8 seats (out of 48 candidates running).
- Independents: 3,40%, 40 seats (out of 86 candidates running).

== Reactions ==
- National Coalition for Syrian Revolutionary and Opposition Forces - Fawwaz al-Mufflih, an official of the Syrian Revolution and Opposition Forces' Hasakah branch, called the elections a "farce" that "will vanish after the regime falls." He also claimed that most Arabs in Rojava opposed the elections.

== See also ==
- 2017 Northern Syria local elections
- List of political parties in Rojava
- Politics of Syria
