= Hediya Yousef =

Syrian-Kurdish politician

Hediya Yousef Hediya Yûsif
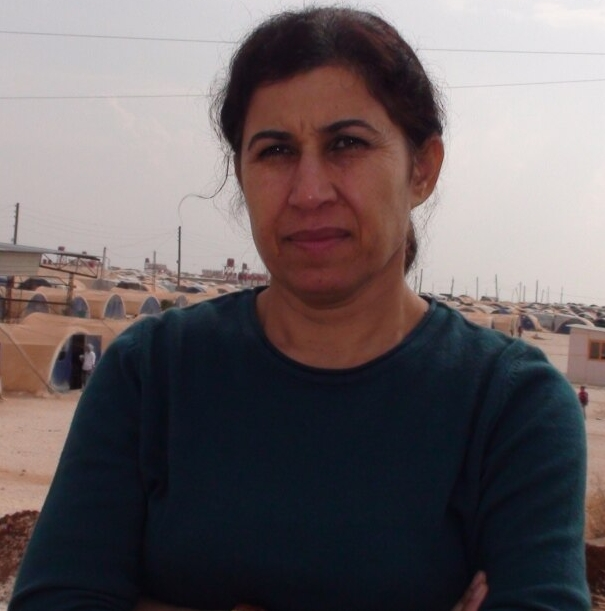
- Yousef in 2019

Co-president of the Executive Council
- In office 17 March 2016 – 18 July 2018 Serving with Mansur Selum
- Preceded by: Position established
- Succeeded by: Îlham Ehmed

Personal details
- Born: 1973 (age 52–53)
- Party: Democratic Union Party
- Other political affiliations: Movement for a Democratic Society
- Occupation: Politician

Hediya Yousef (Kurdish: Hediya Yûsif, Arabic: هدية يوسف) is a Syrian Kurdish politician and former guerrilla fighter who served as co-president of the Executive Council of the Autonomous Administration of North and East Syria from 2016 to 2018. A member of the Democratic Union Party, Yousef worked alongside co-president Mansur Selum, an ethnic Arab, in promoting the region's multi-ethnic and decentralized governance model.

== Early life ==
In her twenties, Hediya Yousef was imprisoned for two years by the Syrian government in Damascus. At the time, she was a guerrilla fighter and was charged with membership in a clandestine organization allegedly seeking to destabilize and divide Syria.

== Co-presidency of Jazeera Canton ==
Yousef initially held the position of co-president of Jazira Canton, located in northeastern Syria within the newly established autonomous region of Rojava. She served alongside Humaydi Daham al-Hadi, an Arab tribal leader. Their office was based in Rmelan, an oil-rich city that had formerly hosted the headquarters of the state-owned Syrian Petroleum Company and was also the site where the Rojava federation was officially declared.

=== Co-governance and Kurdish-Arab cooperation ===
During her cantonal tenure, Yousef emphasized interethnic and interreligious cooperation, particularly between Kurdish and Arab communities. She described the Rojava federation as “something beyond the nation-state—a place where all people, all minorities, and all genders are equally represented.” She also championed the region’s policy of "co-governance," which mandates that every government position is shared by both a male and a female official holding equal authority.

== Co-presidency of the Rojava federation ==
In March 2016, Hediya Yousef was elected co-president of the Executive Council of the Democratic Autonomous Administration of North and East Syria (then called the Democratic Federation of Rojava – Northern Syria), a de facto autonomous region covering approximately 16 percent of Syrian territory. Upon her election, Yousef described the council’s mission as establishing “a wider and more comprehensive system” in areas liberated from the Islamic State of Iraq and the Levant (ISIL), one that “gives rights to all groups to represent themselves and to form their own administrations.”

Highlighting the principle of co-governance and the federation’s aim to ensure inclusive representation of Syria’s diverse ethnic groups, primarily Kurds and Arabs, Kurdish teacher and activist Abdulsalem Mohammed said that “Hediya [Yousef] represents Rojava and [Mansur] Selum represents northern Syria.” He added that this reflects the co-chair system’s commitment to ethnic inclusivity and gender equality.

=== "Democratic confederalism" and Kurdish separatism ===
In addition to her support for co-governance, Yousef has been a proponent of “democratic confederalism,” a political framework developed by Abdullah Öcalan, the honorary leader of the Kurdistan Communities Union (KCK). In his writings from 2005, Öcalan described democratic confederalism as “not a state system [but] the democratic system of a people without a state.”

Yousef has expressed support for Western intervention in the Syrian civil war, particularly in efforts to combat ISIL. However, consistent with the principles of democratic confederalism, she opposes the establishment of a separate Kurdish state. “We will not allow the fragmentation of Syria,” she stated in July 2016. “We want the democratization of Syria.”

== The Unification of Rojava ==
As the Syrian civil war progressed and the Rojava federation began to take shape, Hediya Yousef advocated for the inclusion of additional territories into the autonomous region. She publicly expressed her "desire for Manbij [a city in Aleppo Governorate then controlled by ISIL] to be part of the democratic federal area [of Rojava] after its liberation." This stance was part of a broader initiative aimed at unifying Rojava's Jazira, Kobani, and Afrin cantons into a contiguous and administratively coherent federation.

=== Early offensives ===
In June 2016, approximately three months after Yousef assumed her role as co-president, the Syrian Democratic Forces (SDF)—a U.S.-backed alliance of Kurdish, Arab, and Assyrian militias—launched a military campaign to drive ISIL out of northern Syria and unify the Rojava cantons. On June 10, following the liberation of eight surrounding villages, the Manbij Military Council cut off ISIL's key supply route between Manbij and its de facto capital, Raqqa. Shortly afterward, the SDF captured the town of Osajli, and by June 20, they had seized control of Arima, marking significant progress toward territorial consolidation.

=== The liberation of Manbij ===
In July 2016, approximately six weeks after the launch of the Manbij offensive by the Syrian Democratic Forces, ISIL sustained heavy losses in the western and northern sectors of the city. Despite multiple attempts to break the siege, ISIL was unable to halt the SDF's advance. As the group’s expulsion from the city became imminent, Hediya Yousef announced that Manbij, a strategically important city, would be incorporated into the Rojava federation through a popular referendum. This move was seen as a significant step toward linking the previously non-contiguous cantons of Afrin and Kobani.

On 21 July 2016, the SDF issued a 48-hour ultimatum demanding ISIL’s withdrawal from Manbij. ISIL refused to comply, prompting renewed clashes on July 22. By July 25, the Manbij Military Council, affiliated with the SDF, had seized control of most of the city. By August 5, the MMC had secured roughly 80 percent of Manbij, and on August 6, the SDF declared "almost complete control" over the city. Final liberation was achieved on August 15, 2016, marking a decisive victory in the SDF’s campaign to unify northern Syria under the federal model.
