= Kurdish National Alliance in Syria =

Kurdish National Alliance in Syria Hevbendiya Niştimanî a Kurdî li Sûriyê
- Arabic name: التحالف الوطني الكردي في سوريا
- Leader: Mustafa Mashayikh (Mistefa Meşayîx/مصطفى مشايخ)
- Spokesperson: Mustafa Mashayikh
- Founded: 13 February 2016
- Headquarters: Amuda, al-Hasakah Governorate, Syria
- Ideology: Syrian federalism Kurdish nationalism Feminism
- People's Assembly: 0 / 210
- Democratic Council: 3 / 43
- Councils of Jazira Region: 40 / 2,902
- Councils of Euphrates Region: 40 / 954
- Councils of Afrin Region: 72 / 1,176

Party flag

The Kurdish National Alliance in Syria (HNKS; Kurdish: ھاوپەیمانیی نیشتمانیی کورد لە سووریا, romanized: Hevbendiya Niştimanî a Kurdî li Sûriyê, Arabic: التحالف الوطني الكردي في سوريا, romanized: at-Taḥāluf al-Waṭanī al-Kurdi fi Sūriyā) is a Syrian Kurdish coalition formed by five Syrian Kurdish parties in the city of Amuda in the al-Hasakah Governorate of northeastern Syria on 13 February 2016. Four of the five parties in the coalition were originally members of the Kurdish National Council, but were expelled due to their cooperation with the Democratic Union Party (PYD).

== Constituent parties ==
Name	Leader
Kurdish Democratic Unity Party in Syria	Sheikh Ali
Kurdish Democratic Party in Syria (el-Partî)	Nasruddin Ibrahim
Syrian Kurdish Democratic Reconciliation	
Kurdistan Left Party in Syria	Salih Gedo
Kurdish Reform Movement in Syria	Amjad Othman

== History ==
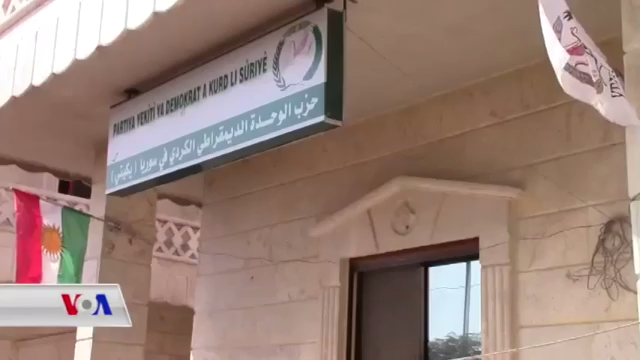
An office of the Kurdish Democratic Unity Party in Syria (PYDKS), a member of alliance, in the town of Afrin.

The Kurdish National Alliance in Syria was founded on 14 February 2016 after 2 days of negotiations between the constituent groups. It stated its goal as to "get rid of Kurdish fragmentation". 39 representatives were elected during the conference.

In June 2016, the group condemned the Kurdish National Council's foreign relations office in Ankara's accusation of the People's Protection Units being a terrorist organization.

In January 2017, the HNKS stated that it will support proposals of unity talks between the Movement for a Democratic Society and the KNC.

The HNKS also took part in the Northern Syria regional elections in December 2017, during which it was one of the two main electoral lists, opposing the PYD-led Democratic Nation List. It ran with 99 candidates for the Jazira Region, with 124 candidates for the Euphrates Region, and with 197 candidates in the Afrin Region. The HNKS consequently won 40 seats in Jazira Region, 40 seats in Euphrates Region, and 72 seats in Afrin Region.

In early March 2018, during the Turkish military operation against the Afrin Region, Turkish-backed Sunni Islamist fighters captured the village of Sharran and burned a flag of the HNKS's Kurdish Democratic Unity Party in Syria (PYDKS) in its vacant office.

== Ideology ==
The Kurdish National Alliance supports Rojava and considers federalism in Syria as the most effective solution to the Syrian Civil War. It claims that its objective is to "stress the necessity of unifying the Kurdish ranks in the face of the current challenges". In addition, it listed 4 recommendations during its formation:

- Approving the national identity of the Kurdish people in Syria
- Listing the Kurdish language as an official language in the constitution of Syria
- Granting full women's rights in the process of the "development of society"
- Activating the role of intellectuals and independent social and national figures

== See also ==
- List of political parties in Rojava
