= Georgette Barsoum =

Syriac feminist activist

- Occupation: Activist, human rights defender

Georgette Barsoum (Syriac: ܓܘܪܓܝܬ ܒܪܨܘܡ, Arabic: جُورْجِيت بَرْصُوم) is an Assyrian human rights and feminist activist. Involved in organizing feminist struggles in the Autonomous Administration of North and East Syria, particularly as the coordinator of the Kongreya Star Congress, she was elected president of the Syriac Women's Union in April 2024.

== Biography ==
In 2012, while attending a screening of a film about the tattoos imposed by the Turkish people on Armenian women who were captured or raped during the Armenian genocide, she lamented that it was brief on the massacres. In 2014, Barsoum traveled to Cairo, Egypt, to protest in front of the Coptic Church headquarters. The new leader, Tawadros II, like his predecessor, Shenouda III, was opposed to increasing women's rights, particularly regarding family status and the possibilities for divorce for Coptic women.

Involved in the struggles of the Autonomous Administration of North and East Syria, particularly in the feminist movements in the area, she organized seminars dedicated to increasing the democratic participation of women in the area, regardless of their ethnicity or religion. Additionally, she was involved in efforts to promote inter-religious understanding within Rojava, notably by presiding over a conference dedicated to the history of religions in Mesopotamia. In the fight against the Islamic State (ISIS), she announced her support for the efforts of the People's Defense Units (YPG).

Initially an organizer for the local section of the Syriac Women's Union in Qamishli, Barsoum opposed the Turkish occupation of Syria and called for resistance against Recep Tayyip Erdoğan's regime. After the assassination of Kurdish politician Hevrin Khalaf by Turkish forces, she called for an international investigation into the circumstances of the assassination and more broadly into the attacks faced by women under the Turkish occupation.

Barsoum is interested in the history of the Assyrian people and the Assyrian and Armenian genocides carried out by the Ottoman Empire in 1915. For her, Rojava is a positive initiative for advancing women's rights in the Middle East. Alongside her commitments within the Syriac Women's Union, she is also a coordinator for the Kongreya Star Congress. Barsoum was the first feminist from Syria to attend the International Conference on Women in 2022, which was held in Basel. Her actions, along with those of other Syrian feminists, were commended at this conference.

In April 2024, Barsoum was elected head of the Syriac Women's Union. Later that same year, she spoke out in support of the revolution being carried out in the region and expressed pride in the work accomplished so far.
