= Syrian Democratic Council =

Political wing of the Syrian Democratic Forces

Syrian Democratic Council ܡܘܬܒܐ ܕܣܘܪܝܐ ܕܝܡܩܪܛܝܬܐ Meclîsa Sûriya Demokratîk مجلس سوريا الديمقراطية
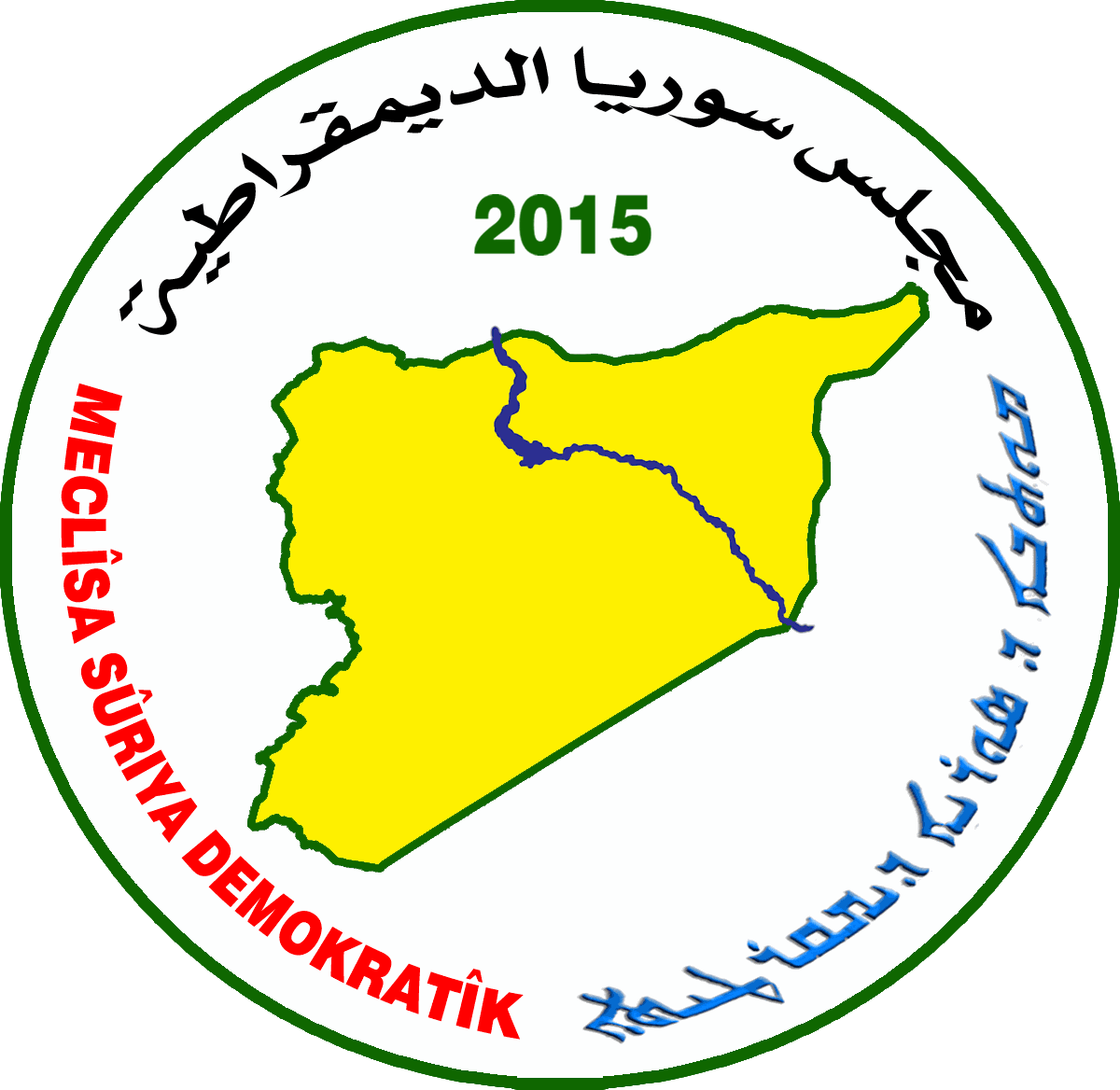

Type
- Type: Unicameral

History
- Founded: 10 December 2015
- Disbanded: 20 August 2026

Leadership
- Co-Chair: Riad Darar, Independent
- Co-Chair: Amina Omar

Structure
- Seats: 43
- Political groups: Democratic Nation List (7): TEV-DEM (3); PYD (3); SUP (3); ADP (1); Opposition (36): HNKS (4); TWDS (4); QMH (3); CDR (2); ENKS (2); STM (1); Ba'ath (1); Independents (19)

Meeting place
- Al-Malikiyah, Al-Hasakah Governorate, Syria

Website
- Official English Website

The Syrian Democratic Council (SDC) (Note: In the local languages: Kurmanji Kurdish: Meclîsa Sûriya Demokratîk; Arabic: مجلس سوريا الديمقراطية, romanized: majlis suria aldiymuqratia; Classical Syriac: ܡܘܬܒܐ ܕܣܘܪܝܐ ܕܝܡܩܪܛܝܬܐ, romanized: Mawtbo d'Suriya Demoqraṭoyto) was the political wing of the Syrian Democratic Forces in the Democratic Autonomous Administration of North and East Syria (DAANES) from 2015 until the integration of the DAANES into the Syrian state in 2026. The SDC's stated mission was to work towards the implementation of a "pluralistic, democratic and decentralized system for all of Syria". In 2024, the DAANES delayed local elections in northeast Syria amid military threats from Turkish-sponsored rebels and opposition from some local political parties, which accused the proposed elections of being unfair.

== Establishment and history ==
=== 2015 ===
The Syrian Democratic Council was established on 10 December 2015 in Al-Malikiyah. Prominent human rights activist Haytham Manna was elected co-chair at its founding.

The newly created Syrian Democratic Council (or Assembly) included 13 members from the earlier Democratic Autonomous Administration, about 24 members from specific ethnic components of Syrian society and particular political parties and groups and five independently elected members.

=== 2016 ===
On 1 August 2016 the Syrian Democratic Council opened a public office in Hasakah.

On 11 September 2016 the Syria's Tomorrow Movement signed a cooperation agreement with the Syrian Democratic Council and the associated de facto autonomous region of the DAANES.

In late September and early October 2016 a forum for the Syrian Democratic Council was held in the town of Rmelan, in the northeastern Hasakah Governorate. Those that attended the conference included a representative from Jableh, in the western Latakia Governorate.

Ronahî TV supported the Democratic Union Party.

=== 2017 ===
On 13 January 2017, a youth constituent assembly was established in Qamishli.

On 25 February 2017, the Assyrian Democratic Party agreed to join the Syrian Democratic Council, and the YPG agreed to hand over security in the Assyrian towns along the Khabur River to the Khabur Guards and Nattoreh which joined the Syrian Democratic Forces. On 13 April, PYD forces officially handed over the Khabur valley's villages to the Khabour Guards and Nattoreh, though the YPG kept a military base near Tell Tamer. On the same day, the second conference of the SDC took place in al-Malikiyah and Riad Darar was elected as the co-president of the SDC, replacing Haytham Manna, alongside Îlham Ehmed, who was re-elected.

On 28 May 2017, a female branch of the Syrian Democratic Council was established in al-Shaddadah.

=== 2018: General and Executive Councils ===
Direct elections for the council were planned for early 2018, but not held. On 16 July 2018, the Third Conference of SDC was held under the slogan "Towards a Political Solution and Building a Decentralized Democratic Syria" in Al-Tabqah city, where the delegates elected Amina Omar and re-elected Riad Darar as co-chairs of SDC. Amina Omar replaced Îlham Ehmed, who was elected co-president of the Executive Council of the DAANES,

On 6 September 2018, SDC held a meeting of local councils and autonomous administration departments in north and east Syria at the headquarters of SDC in Ain Issa town, with the participation of Amina Omar, co-chair of SDC, the heads of the civil councils in North Syria and the dignitaries of the Arab tribes, to form an autonomous administration of north and east of Syria on the basis of the decision taken at the third conference of the SDC held on 16 July 2018. During the meeting, the 70-member General Council for Autonomous Administration of North, East Syria was formed as follows: 49 members of the legislative councils in the areas of Autonomous Administration and civil councils, and 21 members of the technocrats agreed upon through the preparatory committee and discuss other departments. Mrs. Siham Qariou (Syriac) and Mr. Farid Atti (Kurd) were elected to the joint presidency of the General Council for the Democratic Autonomous Administration of North and East Syria, also were elected five members of General Office of the council. Mrs. Berivan Khaled (Khalid) and Abdul Hamid al-Mahbash were elected co-chairmen of Executive Body.

In the meeting held on 3 October 2018, the Executive Council was created, with the election of co-chairs of nine ministries. On 21 October, the first meeting of the General Council was held, at which a legal committee of three people was created, whose tasks is to determine laws, concepts and proposals from committees, departments and offices, in addition to studying the laws issued by the council. At the meeting it was decided to hold meetings of the Council twice a month.

== Involvement in negotiations on Syria ==
While the Syrian Democratic Council stressed its desire to participate in the Geneva and Astana talks, it was excluded from both due to a Turkish veto.

Effective 31 January 2018, the SDC was registered in the US as a "foreign political party" under the Foreign Agents Registration Act.

Regarding the Geneva talks, SDC member Bassam Ishak stated:

As for Iran, Russia, and the Syrian regime, they wanted the regime to regain control over the territories east of the Euphrates River, and therefore they rejected the DAA project and did not want its participation.

Ilham Ehmed, President of the SDC's Executive Council, said:

AANES sought to provide a miniature model that presented the whole of Syria...What had been achieved in northeastern Syria took precedence over the Geneva negotiations, because the talks were taking place with Syrians and not between representatives of external parties.

== Members of the General Federal Council ==
Members of the General Council elected on 10 December 2015 are as follows.

Name	Party	Alliance	Canton	Notes
Salih El-Nebwanî	Law–Citizenship–Rights Movement (QMH)		?	
Haytham Manna	Law–Citizenship–Rights Movement (QMH)		?	Heysem Menaa (Kurdish Transcription)
Majid Hebu	Law–Citizenship–Rights Movement (QMH)		?	Macid Hebo, European Representative of Wheat Wave Movement
Betar El-Şerih	Honor and Rights Convention (CDR)		?	
Meram Dawûd	Honor and Rights Convention (CDR)		?	
Ziyad El-Asî	Syrian Democratic Society	TAA	?	Affiliated to Ahmed Al-Jarba
Kerîm El-Dîn Fadil Fetûm	Democratic Socialist Arab Ba'ath Party		?	
Ebilqadir El-Miwehed	Syrian Democratic Modernity Party	LND	?	Led by Fîras Qesas
Parêzer Elaaddin El-Xalid	Syrian National Democratic Alliance		?	
Ehmed Ehrec	Syrian National Democratic Alliance		?	
Fîdan Berîm	Syrian National Democratic Alliance		?	Rewan Mihemed
Ceyhan Khaddro	Syrian National Democratic Alliance		Shahba	Dayr Hafir Representative
Îşûh Gewriyê	Syriac Union Party (SUP)	LND	Jazira	
Şemîran Şemûn	Syriac Union Party (SUP)	LND	Jazira	
Lawyer Macid Behî	Syriac Union Party (SUP)	LND	Jazira	
Mihmedê Mûsê	Left Party of Syrian Kurds	LND	?	
Rojîn Remo	Kongra Star	LND		Women's Representative, also in Democratic Union Party (PYD)
Alî Hoco	N/A	N/A	Shahba	Jarablus Representative
Sîhanok Dîbo	Democratic Union Party (PYD)	LND	Jazira	
Hikmet Hebîb	Arab National Coalition	LND	?	
Şêx Alî	Kurdish Democratic Unity Party (PYDKS or Yek-Dem)	HNKS	?	
Wail Mîrza	Assyrian Democratic Party	LND	Jazira	
Telal Mihemed	Syrian Kurds' Democratic Peace Party (PADKS)	LND	?	
Mizgîn Zêdan	Democratic Transformation Party	LND	?	
Ferhad Têlo	Kurdistan Liberal Union Party (PYLK)	LND	?	
Xensa Hemûd	Bureau of Arab Women		?	
Newal El-Mezîd	Independent		?	
Ebdilrezaq Mihemed El-Taî	Democratic Council of Arab Tribes		Jazira	
Îlham Ehmed	Democratic Union Party (PYD)	LND	?	Kongra Star
Cîhad Mihemed Omer	Independent (TEV-DEM)	LND	?	
Emar Helûş El-Salêm	Independent		?	
Fewzî Şengalî	Kurdish Democratic Accord Party (al Wifaq)	HNKS	?	
Emcet Osman	Syrian Reform Movement (Al-Îslah)	HNKS	?	
Îbrahîm El-Hesen	N/A	N/A	Kobanî	Tell Abyad Turkmen Representative
Bêrîvan Ehmed	N/A	N/A	N/A	Youth Representative
Faris Eto Şemo	Yazidi House		Jazira	Mala Êzîdiyan
Fehed Daqûrî	Council of Kurdish Tribes		Kobanî	
Cîhan Xedro	Independent		Shahba	
Cemal Şêx Baqî	Syrian Kurdish Democratic Party (PDK-S)	ENKS	?	Jamal Sheik Baqi
Nasir El-Nasir	Independent		?	
Bassam Said Ishak	Syriac National Council	LND	?	Syriac European diaspora Representative
Hisnî Xemîs	Independent		?	
