= Democratic Society Movement =

Democratic Society Movement may refer to:

- a forerunner of the Kurdish Democratic Society Party in Turkey.
- Movement for a Democratic Society, an organ of the de facto autonomous region of Syrian Kurdistan (Rojava).
