= Elizabeth Gawrie =

Rojava politician

Elizabeth Gawrie is a Syrian politician, who served as Deputy Prime Minister of the Jazira Region of the Autonomous Administration of North and East Syria. She was elected in 2014 and is a member of the Syriac Union Party. She serves under Akram Hesso, and her co-deputy is Hussein Taza Al Azam.

Gawrie is a Syriac Christian and a follower of the Syriac Orthodox Church.
