= Îlham Ehmed =

Syrian Kurdish politician (born 1963)

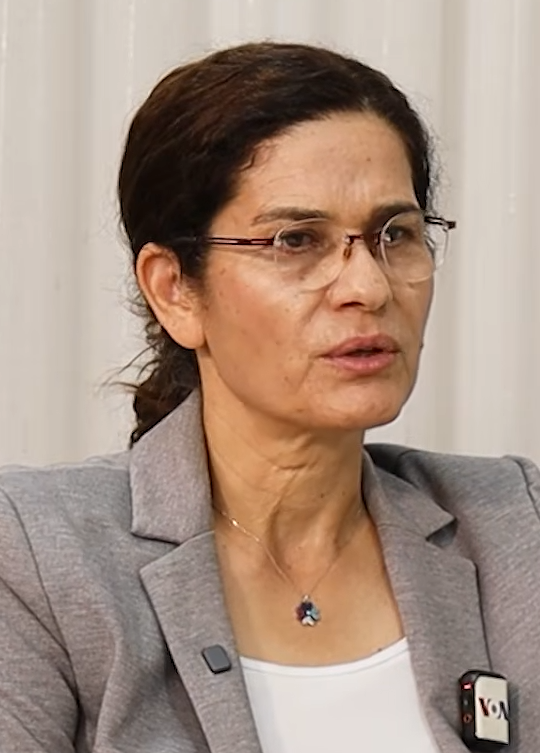
- Ehmed in 2026

Co-president of the Executive Council
- In office 18 July 2018 – 20 August 2026 Serving with Mansur Selum
- Preceded by: Hediya Yousef
- Succeeded by: Post abolished

Co-chair of the Syrian Democratic Council
- In office 10 December 2015 – 16 July 2018 Serving with Haytham Manna
- Preceded by: Position established
- Succeeded by: Amina Omar

Personal details
- Born: 28 December 1963 (age 62) Afrin, Aleppo, Syria
- Party: Democratic Union Party
- Other political affiliations: Movement for a Democratic Society
- Occupation: Politician

Îlham Ehmed (Arabic: إلهام أحمد, born 28 December 1963; also referred to as Ilham Ahmad or Ilham Ahmed) is a Syrian politician who served as co-president of the Executive Council of the Democratic Autonomous Administration of North and East Syria from 2018 until its integration into the Syrian state in 2026. A member of the Democratic Union Party, she previously served as co-chair of the Syrian Democratic Council from 2015 to 2018.

She also acted as co-chair of the Foreign Affairs Department of the Democratic Autonomous Administration of North and East Syria.

== Early life and career ==
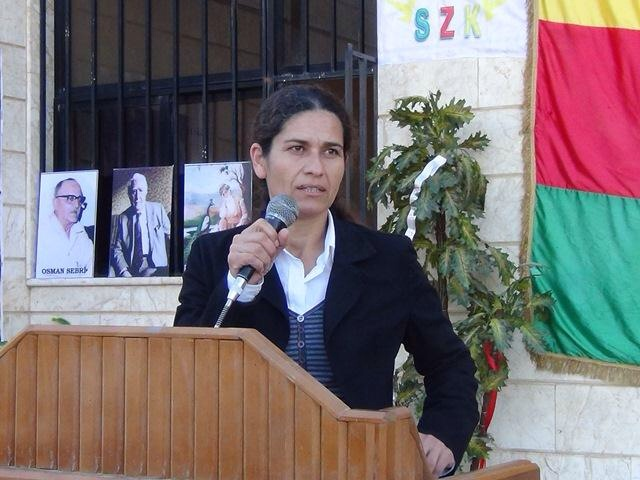
Ehmed in 2013

An ethnic Kurd born in Afrin, Ehmed has been outspoken on the aim of a programmatically polyethnic and secular character of a future Syria. At the start of the second Raqqa campaign in November 2016, she said:

Such an administration could provide a good example for democratic change in Raqqa, especially that the city has been for years a de facto capital for the ISIS terrorist group. This accomplishment would be a major change in the overall situation in Syria, and would help the country move towards stability, democratic change. Raqqa will be an example for the whole country.

Having been involved with the Kurdish nationalist movement since the 1990s, Ehmed seeks have a decentralized government in the form of a federalized Syria. She claims that local civilian councils and governments would emerge in Syrian Kurdistan in such a decentralized state that guarantee the rights of different Syrian groups, including freedom of speech, and gender equality. She advocates for the rights of the Kurdish people to be guaranteed in the Syrian constitution. Ehmed took part in negotiations with the Syrian government in Damascus concerning services that shall be provided also in the areas governed by the SDC in July 2018. She has since repeatedly laid the blame for the failure of political talks on Damascus, stating:

The ruling regime has not changed its stance, not on the humanitarian or political levels. It has not shown any flexibility towards the Syrians who are at odds with it. It rejected channels of communication to address the aftermath of the earthquake and ensuing humanitarian catastrophe...They are the main obstacle in unifying the Syrian vision.

=== Negotiations with France ===
Following threats from Turkey to launch an offensive against Afrin and U.S. President Donald Trump’s announcement of American troop withdrawal from regions controlled by the Syrian Democratic Forces in December 2018, Ehmed traveled to Paris with SDC co-chair Riad Darar. Their discussions with the French government focused on enhancing cooperation with French forces stationed in SDF-governed areas. These negotiations resulted in an agreement for French troops to maintain their presence in Syria.
