= Syrian National Democratic Alliance =

Syrian National Democratic Alliance التحالف الوطني الديمقراطي السوري al-Tahaluf al-Watani al-Demokrati al-Suri
- Leader: Alaeddine Khaled
- Founded: 16 September 2014
- Headquarters: Sarrin and Afrin, Syria (Afrin until March 2018)
- Ideology: Pluralist democracy Democratic confederalism
- Political position: Left-wing
- Colors: Green, white, yellow
- Slogan: Towards a Pluralist Syrian Democracy
- People's Assembly: 0 / 210
- Syrian Democratic Council: 4 / 43
- Councils of the Afrin Region: 8 / 1,176

Website
- Official website

The Syrian National Democratic Alliance (Arabic: التحالف الوطني الديمقراطي السوري, al-Tahaluf al-Watani al-Demokrati al-Suri, TWDS) is a left-wing multi-ethnic political party established in 2014 in northern Syria.

The alliance was founded during the Syrian Civil War and the war has considerably affected its policies to become very critical of totalitarianism and extremist beliefs. However the party is "ready to build bridges with the parties that recognize the right of Syria's components in general and the Kurds in particular", according to party leader Alaeddine Khaled.

The party had 5 politicians in the Syrian Democratic Council of the Democratic Autonomous Administration of North and East Syria prior to its dissolution; the party leader, Ahmad Araj, was one of the seven members of the Executive Council.

== History ==
On 7 February 2016, the first conference of the party was held. The alliance closely coordinates with the Syrian Alliance for Freedom and Human Rights and the Syrian Revolutionary Left Current. Since then, the Northern Democratic Brigade has also de facto joined the TWDS.

On 11 March 2017, after negotiations between the Syrian National Democratic Alliance, the political council of Idlib, and the Army of Revolutionaries, 80 prisoners of war from Turkey-supported rebels were released from captivity by the Syrian Democratic Forces.

Between 24 and 25 May 2017, the second conference of the SNDA was held in Afrin, Syria under the slogan of "We are all partners".

In course of the 2017 Northern Syria regional elections, the TWDS ran for 48 seats of the Afrin Region's councils, out of which it won eight.
