= Riad Darar =

Syrian opposition political and social activist

Riad Hammoud Darar
- رياض حمود دارار

Co-chair of the Syrian Democratic Council
- In office 25 February 2017 – 20 August 2026 Serving with Amina Omar
- Preceded by: Haytham Manna
- Succeeded by: Post abolished

Founding member of the National Coordination Committee for Democratic Change
- In office June 2011 – August 2014

Personal details
- Born: 1954 (age 71–72) Deir ez-Zor, Second Syrian Republic
- Education: Bachelor's degree on Arabic language in Damascus University

Riad Hammoud Darar (Arabic: رياض حمود دارار, born 1954) is a Syrian opposition political and social activist and author from Deir ez-Zor. He was a campaigner for human rights for Kurds in Syria since 2000. During his activism, he was imprisoned by the Syrian government for 5 years and was released in 2010.

On 25 February 2017, he was elected co-chair of the Syrian Democratic Council, serving until the integration of the Democratic Autonomous Administration of North and East Syria into the Syrian state in 2026.

== Early life ==
Riad Darar was born in Deir ez-Zor in 1954. He received a bachelor's degree on Arabic language some time later, and became a preacher and an imam at a mosque in Deir ez-Zor.

== Political career ==
Since 2000, Riad Darar became a political activist and began to work with various non-governmental organizations. After an uprising by Kurds in Syria in 2004, Mashouq al-Khaznawi, a Kurdish Sufi religious leader, was arrested and assassinated by the Syrian military intelligence in May 2005. Riad Darar was among those who were present at al-Khaznawi's funeral, and gave a speech. The next month, Darar was arrested. On 2 April 2006, he was sentenced to 5 years in prison by the Supreme State Security Court.

On 10 June 2010, Riad Darar was released from prison. In June 2011, during the early phase of the Syrian uprising, he became a founding member of the National Coordination Committee for Democratic Change, a Syrian opposition bloc. Riad Darar became one of the major figures in the Syrian opposition. In August 2014, he resigned from the NCC due to the lack of unity.

On 25 February 2017, during the second conference of the Syrian Democratic Council in al-Malikiyah, Riad Darar was elected as the co-leader of the SDC, replacing Haytham Manna, another former NCC member who resigned from the SDC. Riad Darar then announced his support for federalism and democracy in Syria, including in Deir ez-Zor.

== See also ==
- Michel Kilo
