= Kongra Star =

Confederation of women's organizations in Rojava, Syria

Flag of Kongreya Star

Flag of Yekîtiya Star

Kongra Star (Kurdish for Star Congress), founded in 2005 under the name of Yekîtiya Star (Kurdish for Star Union of Women), is a confederation of women's organizations in Rojava, Syria. The name Star "refers to the ancient Mesopoamian goddess Ishtar, and nowadays the name also refers to celestial stars." They have been instrumental in the significant advances made in gender relations in the region. Its work is based on the claim that "without the liberation of women, a truly free society is impossible." One of its founding members is Îlham Ehmed, former co-chair of the Syrian Democratic Council.

== Founding principles ==
The four founding principles of Kongreya Star are as such:

1. "Star Congress is based on the voluntary union of democratic organizations, institutions and democratic figures. It is a confederal women's organization which organises itself in the form of communes, assemblies, academies, cooperatives, foundations, associations, parties, etc."
2. "Each organization, union or committee that joins protects its identity. It joins Star Congress based on principles of mutual dependency. The organization operates according to the principles of radical democracy."
3. "Star Congress is responsible for the coordination, implementation and supervision of the decisions and policies of different institutions, organizations and canton assemblies."
4. "Kongreya Star is flexible and embraces diversity and democratic participation."

== The Congress of Kongra Star ==
The Congress of Kongreya Star is an event head every two years in which all the organizations and groups under the umbrella movement of Kongreya Star assemble to reflect on work done in the past as well as goals for the future. Each congress has embraced the decision to fight for the freedom of leader Abdullah Öcalan, whose democratic confederalism has become the guiding principle for Rojava and the Kongreya Star movement.

=== History of the Congresses (2005–2016) ===
The First Congress took place on January 15, 2005. Due to the secretive nature of the meeting, there were only a few women present. During this congress, the formation of Yekîtiya Star was declared. The women in attendance began reaching out to other activist groups to begin discussing women's oppression across Syria.

The Second Congress took place on July 9–10, 2007. 61 women were present for the conference. The Congress decided to expand the movement and get more women involved in the organization, but the Ba'ath regime had the women revolutionaries arrested.

The Third Congress took place on December 6, 2009, with 81 women attending the event. The Congress was held the slogan "we are not anyone's honor, our honor is our freedom," in order to raise awareness of the "number of women and girls killed in the name of family honor." The main talking points for the Third Congress were how to stop the spread of prostitution and drugs, amongst other oppressions faced by women.

The Fourth Congress was held on July 29, 2011, through July 30, 2011, in Afrin. Under the slogan "To increase the pace of the women's liberation struggle and build democratic self-administration," 100 women, representing women's organizations across western Kurdistan and Syria, were present for the conference. Understanding the importance of self-administration, the Congress decided to create assemblies and communes, as well as elect a 31-member body that would serve as Rojava's coordination.

The Fifth Congress took place in April 2013. 251 women attended the conference which was held under the slogan, "So that women will not remain outside of the organization."

The Sixth Congress was held from February 25 to 26, 2016, with the overarching theme of "To build a democratic nation in women's color." With over 250 women in attendance, the Congress decided to change its name from Yekîtiya Star to its current name of Kongreya Star (Star Congress).

== Communes ==
Neighborhoods and towns in Rojava are organized in communes of seven to two hundred people; previously, these communes made up the cantons of Afrîn, Kobanê, and Cizîre. These communes are organized in two networks: those run by Tev-Dem, which are made up of men and women, and women's communes, which are the basis of Kongreya Star.

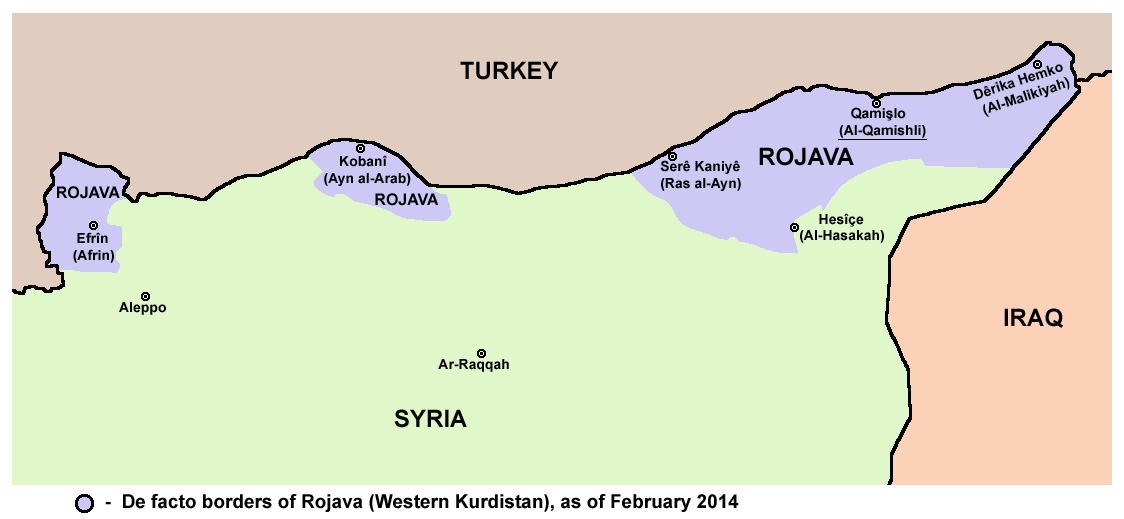
A map of Rojava, as of February 2014

Within the women's communes, women are encouraged to share their opinions and be active members of society, often for the first time in their lives. Women have a high participation rate in the communes, with the average ranging from 50 to 70%, with some reaching 100%.

=== Committees ===
There are five different types of committees present in every commune.

==== Education Committees ====
One of Kongreya Star's main objectives is overseeing the education committees within the women's communes. The education committee is burdened with providing practical and ideological training to all commune members. While they have empirical courses, such as language classes, their main focuses is teaching the ideals of democratic confederalism. The committee has five departments focused on research, training educators which can provide courses with their respective lectures for the women to attend.

==== Health Committees ====
The health committee within the communes are responsible for coordinating between the regional health services and the communes themselves. The committee provides training on first-aid, natural medicine, and prenatal care. Recently, especially in the women's communes, several women's health care centers have been created.

==== Economy Committees ====
The economy committees are responsible for supporting the commune's cooperatives, especially those that require using common agricultural lands.

==== Problem Solving Committees ====
The problem solving committees are responsible for mediation of conflicts within the communes, whether they are neighborly or familial. Within the women's communes, the problem solving committees work closely with the House of Women, an institute that can be found in every town, which engages itself in "advanced conflict solution and juridical assistance to women in all types of conflict, including domestic violence."

==== Self Defense Committees ====
The self defense committees are organized at the commune level by the People's Protection Units (HPC). These committees consist of both men and women who have received specialized training in defense. They coordinate with local security forces and are responsible for neighborhood security at times of conflict.

== Education ==
The education committees under the control of Kongreya Star have the responsibility of overseeing the instruction of the women in the communes, as well as the Star Academy. The education committees have three main goals: "furthering the education of women, spreading awareness of women's topics in society at large and transforming existing structures of education." An overarching theme that dominates the education committees is the initiative of "mak[ing] women wise again, in order to shed the attitudes towards men and women that serve patriarchy." Kongreya Star believes that when women are given a proper education, not only will they be able to begin to dismantle power structures in which men dominate, but also play a more active role in society. As Kongreya Star believes "emancipation can only occur when one knows oneself and one's history," having an accurate education that focuses on understanding the past and cultural conflicts is essential for the further liberation of women.

=== Education principles ===
The educational goals of Kongreya Star are centered around understanding and dismantling current structures and institutions of power. In the classes, there is an emphasis on teaching how these systems of dominance came to be and how societies before them, especially during the Neolithic, Mesolithic and Paleolithic eras, were configured. Kongreya Star believes that "societies which existed before patriarchal and hierarchical systems became predominant were centered on women." The movement not only aims to include women in the traditional framework of knowledge, but also to reexamine and reshape these frameworks, questioning their place in society and disassembling powerful ideologies. For example, they often look at alternative ways of understanding language development, such as focusing on the importance of oral history and the effects of women singing and talking to their children from birth.

In the courses, participants are encouraged to follow their natural curiosity. They emphasize the principle that freedom and education are both part of collective processes, not individual ones. The classes themselves are discussion-based, and instructors support self-reflection. Another important aim of Kongreya Star education is the re-education of men and the unlearning of the patriarchy. Both men and women must understand that as women take on a larger role in society, men's roles will have to change in order to accommodate this transformation. Furthermore, they preach education as a method of self-defense. According to Kongreya Star, those who know their culture's history, politics, language, etc. are better equipped to defend themselves against dominance and use their education as a weapon against capitalism.

"We need to change the capitalist mentality – which is a patriarchal mentality – which seeks to make profit out of everything. But we cannot allow woman to become independent from man by putting herself in an exploited position [of employment]. It is not about integrating her into a capitalist system through work, it's about building up a new economic system." — Arin Khalil, Women's Economy Committee in Qamishlo

==== Jineology ====
Jineology ('the science of women' in Kurdish) is a type of academic study that focuses on feminist epistemology and the re-learning of science, which is typically written and taught from a male point of view. At the local level, Jineology is taught at "research centers, institutions and academies," through "conducting research, developing ideas and running seminars and training programs." Jineology follows the belief of Öcalan, that there cannot be a free Kurdistan, or any free society, without the freedom of women.

=== The Star Congress Training Committee ===
The Star Congress Training Committee was established on January 1, 2016, in Jazira Canton. It has education centers in Hassakah, Qamishli, Afrîn, and Kobani. The committee has the goal of creating sub-committees in every commune as well as training women in these sub-committees to further educate local women. The committee instructs Kurds, Arabs, Turkmen, Chechens, and others.

The committee is split into five focuses:

==== Department of Research ====
The Department of Research focuses on analyzing conflicts faced in Northern Syria, especially those conflicts faced by women. Through a series of questionnaires, data is collected to be summarized in a report and dispersed throughout the region by way of panel discussions and lectures.

==== Department of Trainer Education ====
With the objective of training instructors, the Department of Trainer Education "defines the fundamentals of training, prepares objectives, presents facts, and provides an effective intellectual challenge so that trainers can learn how to effectively educate others and achieve better results."

==== Department of Courses ====
The department of courses has two main tasks. The first is to provide training courses for women to take with the goal of supporting women's efforts, developing their academic expertise, identifying strengths and weaknesses, and improving their political and social role in society. The second task of the department is to "educate rural women through training programs designed to meet their needs." With the goal of increasing social and familial activity, these women are visited in their homes and given lectures about "subjects like family planning, childcare, protecting women against diseases such as breast cancer, reproductive health, childhood diseases, economic empowerment, equality between men and women, literacy, and underage marriage."

==== Community Heritage Department ====
This department is responsible for chronicling women's practical talents, such as "making medicines, making carpets, storytelling, and music; as well as archiving words, proverbs, and stories that represent the history and culture of all the peoples of the region."

==== Lectures Department ====
This department is responsible for preparing academic training materials, such as lectures and posters, for instructors and the training committee to use. The department prepares lectures on "culture, human rights, health, social and economic empowerment, management, gender equality, women's leadership, women's psychology, how to raise children, child marriage, how to use the internet, community values, hygiene," and more.

== The Women's Participatory Economy Committee ==
Kongra Star believes that women should hold a prominent place in the economy and the agricultural industry because of their ancient historical and natural roles as caretakers and gatherers, in which women were idolized and sometimes compared to goddesses like Ashtar or Inana. However, over time, masculinity took a stronger role in society and women were exploited economically by the patriarchy and lost their role in the economy. During and after the Rojava Revolution, it was important for women to regain their role in the economic development of the region.

In May 2017, the first Women's Economic Conference took place, with 50 delegates attending. The conference determined the following as their goals:

- "Establish women's economic academies.
- Establish special shops to sell women's products.
- Develop agricultural and animal breeding projects in a creative way as a model for women's economic participation in the Middle East.
- Strengthen women's projects and associations.
- Ensure progress and development for women in industrial and commercial fields."

=== Goals of the Women's Economic Committee ===
The Women's Economic Committee was created in 2015 "in order to create a democratic social economy" for women and Northern Syria, with the goal of actualizing a model of "effort and value." The committee seeks to pursue collective economy in the communes that "takes in complimentary support," and to build women's self confidence so that they may combat capitalism.

==== Projects ====
The Women's Economic Committee holds training courses in the communes, designed to show an alternative to capitalism, with the goal of giving women the ability to "understand their true economic identity, realize that they could play an important part in the society's economy, and give an ecological culture to the economy and society."

They also have created cooperative associations, supervised by The Associations' House, to improve equality and provide economic support to local projects. These projects are based on regional needs and are decided by the members. Each association has at least 7 women, and as of 2018, there were 86 associations which employed 7,000 women. The associations work to be inclusive for people of all backgrounds, as well as combat racism and discrimination.

Other industrial and commercial cooperatives have been created that focus on the poultry, dairy, and cheese industry, as well as others that focus on sewing and clothes-making.

==== Agricultural Projects ====
Kongreya Star has created agricultural cooperatives in which women alone are responsible for all the agricultural labor (e.g. cultivation and harvesting). All the work is done organically, without synthesized materials and by hand. Profits from the farms are distributed equally among members of the cooperative. In Hassakeh, 15 thousand acres of land have been dedicated to these women's agricultural cooperatives, as well as 4 thousand in Qamishli, and hundreds of women have found jobs there.

== Media and publications ==
=== The Women's Media Committee ===
Prior to the Rojava Revolution, Kurdish media was heavily suppressed by the Ba'ath regime in an effort to promote Arabization and the abolition of the Kurdish culture and language. During their careers, Kurdish media personnel faced legal punishment, threats, and occasionally even death. Since the Rojava Revolution, Kurds have been given a platform to participate in media and disperse Kurdish viewpoints to all. In recent years, women especially have become essential to the industry.

In April 2014, the Women's Media Committee was formed. The conference, which was attended by journalists and media personnel from across Rojava, decided to create a women's media center in Northern Syria as a headquarters through which women journalists could come together and collaborate. As of 2018, 57% of media institutes in Northern Syria were women.

The second Women's Media Conference took place on August 3, 2016. The resolutions decided in the conference were: to open a women's media academy, and to "establish an Arabic-language department in the women's news agency... as well as to establish a department for women in the Hawar News Agency."

==== Goals of the Committee ====
The overarching goal of the Women's Media Committee is to "define and spread the democratic communal values of women, and to convey their struggle and resistance for their freedom, for their people's freedom, and for the revolutionary struggles of women worldwide in an effective matter." The committee is also committed to improving the skills of women working in the media field so they may better spread an alternative viewpoint of radical democratic ideals and women's liberation.

==== Projects ====
Under the Women's Media Committee, Kongreya Star publishes Asoya Jinê, a women's magazine covering "a variety of topics including political and social affairs, interviews with women, and a space devoted to women guerrillas who have fallen in the struggle. There is also Kuncika Malame: a forum for readers and followers to share feelings, poems, memories and stories, as well as a space for mothers to discuss handicrafts."

In December 2017, in a collaboration between the Jin News Agency and other women's media projects, a live broadcast of Star FM was started.

== The Women's Justice Committee ==
=== Mala Jin - Women's Houses ===
The first women's house, a "civic and social" establishments that work to "raise awareness of women and family issues and to solve the social and human rights problems that women face." The first women's house was created in March 2011 in Qamishli by women who referred to themselves as the "suicide group" because of their determination to make progress towards social justice.

Due to mistrust and internalized sexism, the women's houses were not popular at first. Nonetheless, popularity grew over time as women came to understand that the institutions were there to support them and defend their rights. Women's houses are responsible for marital and family disputes. Those that cannot be settled at the women's houses move on to the courts.

In November 2011, the first conference of women's houses took place under the slogan "Justice is a sacred social value." At the seminar, there were 135 representatives from women's houses across Jazira, Afrîn, Kobani, Damascus, and Manbij.

=== The Women's Problem-Solving Committee ===
Hundreds of problem solving committees have been created in all communes, and are responsible for training people on the regional and local court systems.

=== The Women's Council for Social Justice ===
The Women's Council for Social Justice "oversees all judicial and social institutions, and supervises all of the women's judicial institutions in Rojava." Women hold a 50% stake in the social justice system, and "contribute to the preparation of democratic bills related to women, children and family issues."

==== Goals of the Women's Council for Social Justice ====
The goals of the council are to defend both individual and community rights, reject the principles of traditional society and the traditional international system, struggle against all forms of "traditional patriarchal violence against women, such as honor crimes," and abolish "masculine authoritarianism" to replace it with "social characteristics that come from women's nature, such as equality, cooperation, partnership, justice, and struggle against authoritarian ideologies."

Since 2015, annual conferences for the Women's Council for Social Justice have been held.

== Other Activities ==
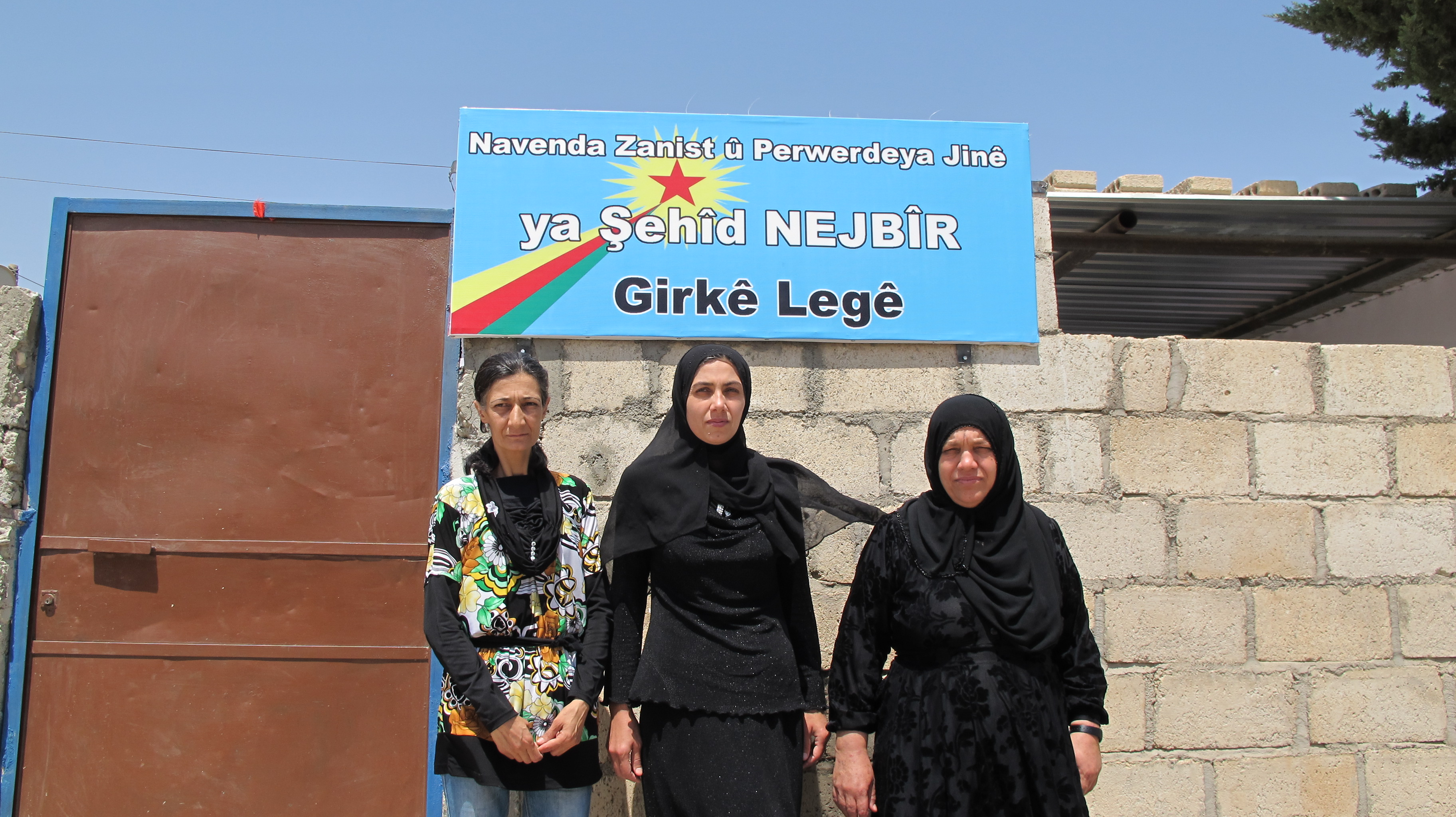
Girke Lege's women centre offers services to survivors of domestic violence, sexual assault and other forms of harm.

Other projects and activities are organized by the organization, including the opening of a park in honor of Kurdish leader Abdullah Öcalan's birthday, campaigns and demonstrations against honor killings and the creation of safe houses for victims of domestic violence.
