= Honor and Rights Convention =

Honor and Rights Convention (in Arabic) تجمع عهد الكرامة والحقوق (in Kurdish) Kombûna Rûmet û Mafnasiyê
- Leader: Meram Dawûd
- Founded: September 17, 2011
- Ideology: Secularism
- Political position: Left-wing
- Colors: Red; Green; Black
- Slogan: Freedom, Dignity, Rights
- People's Assembly: 0 / 250
- Democratic Council: 2 / 43

Website
- Official page on Facebook

The Honor and Rights Convention (Arabic: تجمع عهد الكرامة والحقوق, CDR) is a secular left-wing multi-ethnic political party established in 2011 in northern Syria during the Arab Spring.

The party has 2 politicians in the Democratic Assembly of the Federation of Northern Syria – Rojava and the party leader Meram Dawûd, is one of the nine members of Executive Council.

== Ideology ==
The Honor and Rights Convention's secular values put it at odds with many of the more extremist Syrian opposition groups who are Salafists or Islamists, which has led to the party refusing to work with these groups and for them to condemn those foreign countries who arm and fund these types of groups in Syria. However it has also strongly criticised Russian support for the Syrian government and their military intervention in the country.

== History ==
In early 2015, the party leader Meram Dawûd was arbitrarily detained by the Syrian Air Force Intelligence Directorate when he was being processed by Syrian Immigration at the Damascus International Airport after arriving back from a Syrian opposition conference in Cairo, Egypt.
