= Yazidi House =

Organization in Rojava, Syria

The logo of the Yazidi House

The Yazidi House (Kurdish: Mala Êzdiyan ,مالا ئێزدیان) is an umbrella organization of Yazidi organizations in the Rojava region of northern Syria. It has the goal of documenting Yazidi culture and customs, and establishing relations with Yazidi organizations internationally. During the Battle of Baghuz Fawqani, the Yazidi House provided medical aid to Yazidi women and children rescued from ISIL, and is assisting in reuniting them with their families in Sinjar. The first Yazidi House was founded in the northwestern Syrian village Basufan in 2012, after the area was captured by the Kurdish-majority People's Protection Units.
