= Euphrates Region =

De facto region in Syria (2014–2026)

- Region of the Autonomous Administration of North and East Syria
- 2014–2026
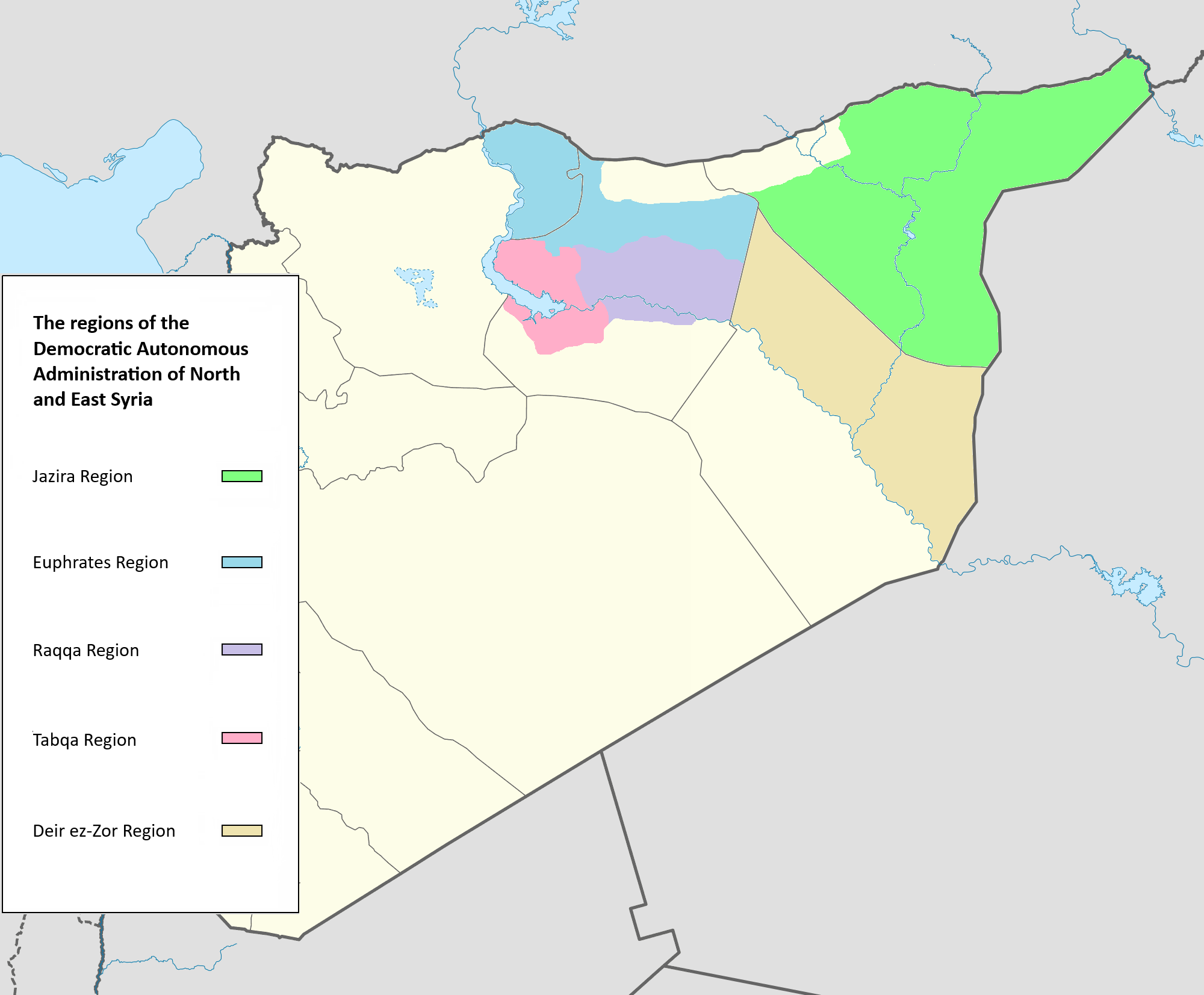
- The regions of the Autonomous Administration of North and East Syria in March 2024, with the Euphrates Region shown in blue
- Capital: Kobanî
- Population
  - 2004: 322,227
- Historical era: Syrian Civil War
  - Autonomy declared: 2014
  - Integration into the Syrian state: 2026
Preceded by	Succeeded by
Ba'athist Syria	Syrian Arab Republic
- Today part of: Syria

Euphrates Region, also known as the Kobani Administration and Autonomous Administration in Kobani, formerly the Kobanî Canton, (Kurdish: Herêma Firatê; Arabic: إقليم الفرات; Classical Syriac: ܦܢܝܬܐ ܕܦܪܬ, romanized: Ponyotho d'Prat) was an administrative region of the Autonomous Administration of North and East Syria, comprising Ayn al-Arab District of the Aleppo Governorate alongside northern areas of Raqqa Governorate.

The security headquarters was taken over by the Syrian government on 26 February 2026, marking the beginning of the integration of the Asayish Forces into the Syrian Armed Forces. As of 6 April 2026, the Euphrates Region still existed, although its institutions had already been integrated into the Syrian state. In August 2026, the region became fully integrated into the Syrian state.

== Demographics ==
The population of Euphrates Region was unknown due to substantial refugee movements, but that of Kobane Canton alone before 2014 was estimated at 400,000, with an ethnic Kurdish majority. Due to intense fighting, at least three-quarters of the population fled across the border to Turkey in 2014; however, many returned in 2015.

The largest locality of the region and the only one with more than 10,000 inhabitants was, according to the 2004 Syrian census, Kobanî (44,821).

== History ==
In the course of the Syrian civil war and the Rojava conflict, Syrian government forces withdrew from the area, and on 27 January 2014, an autonomous Kobanî Canton under the Constitution of Rojava was declared and institutions were established.

In July 2013, the Islamic State of Iraq and the Levant (ISIL) began to forcibly displace Kurdish civilians from towns in Raqqa Governorate. After demanding that all Kurds leave Tell Abyad or else be killed, thousands of civilians, including Turkmens and Arabs, fled on 21 July. ISIL fighters looted and destroyed the property of Kurds and, in some cases, resettled displaced Sunni Arab families from the an-Nabek District (Rif Damascus), Deir ez-Zor and Raqqa in abandoned Kurdish homes. A similar pattern was documented in Tel Arab and Tal Hassel in July 2013. As ISIL consolidated its authority in Raqqa, Kurdish civilians were forcibly displaced from Tel Akhader and from the immediate Kobanî area in March and September 2014, respectively.

Euphrates Region saw fighting with the Islamic State from 2014 onward. In September 2014, ISIL launched a major assault against the Euphrates Region, capturing more than 100 Kurdish villages. As a consequence of the ISIL occupation, up to 200,000 Kurdish refugees fled from the Euphrates Region to Turkey, allowed in only on the condition that they left their vehicles and livestock behind. While committing massacres and kidnapping women in the seized villages, ISIL forces were not able to occupy the entire region, as the People's Defense Units (YPG) and Women's Protection Units (YPJ) forces successfully put up stiff resistance in the city of Kobanî. After weeks of isolation as a result of Turkey blocking arms and fighters from entering the city, the US-led coalition finally began to target the ISIL assault forces with airstrikes. This move helped the YPG/YPJ to force ISIL to retreat from the city, and much of the surrounding region was retaken by Kurdish forces. After the successful summer 2015 Tell Abyad offensive of YPG/YPJ forces against ISIL, municipalities there voted to join the autonomous Kobanî Canton administration, creating the region in its contemporary shape.

== Politics and administration ==
Kobanî's Legislative Assembly had two co-presidents, Lemis Abdullah (an Armenian woman refugee from Tell Abyad) and Mihemed Şahin (a Kurdish man).

== Economy ==
The economy of the region was mainly based on agriculture, with greenhouse agriculture having been introduced since the establishment of the Euphrates Region.

While there was no significant industrial area in the Euphrates Region, there were a large number of cement production facilities.

Some electricity was supplied by the Tishrin Dam on the Euphrates, also in the Euphrates Region; a lot was also produced by diesel generators.

Around the region, but in particular in the city of Kobanî, economic priorities were the continuing war and reconstruction, including assistance for returning refugees. Most of the city and surrounding villages had been destroyed or badly damaged, and there was a danger of landmines. As of January 2017, despite the paucity of resources available and the embargoes imposed on the region, the rebuilding process had made considerable progress; over 70% of damaged roads had been restored, two hospitals had been rebuilt and another two had been added, and the 15 rebuilt schools hosted over 50,000 students.

== Education ==
Like in the other regions in the Autonomous Administration of North and East Syria, primary education in public schools was initially instructed according to each student's mother tongue, be it Kurdish or Arabic. Students then began to learn their second language, Kurdish or Arabic, as well as receiving additional instruction in English. This was due to Rojava's stated goal of students achieving bilingualism in both Kurdish and Arabic by secondary schooling. Curricula were a topic of continuous debate between the regions' Boards of Education and the Syrian central government in Damascus, which partly paid the teachers. With Euphrates Region being home to a Syrian Turkmen minority, school education bilingual in Turkish and Arabic was also made available.

The federal, regional and local administrations in Rojava placed much emphasis on promoting libraries and educational centers to facilitate learning and social and artistic activities. One cited example was the Rodî û Perwîn Library, established in May 2016 in Kobani.

== See also ==
- Federalization of Syria
- Rojava conflict
- Rojava
- Afrin Region
- Jazira Region
- Siege of Kobanî
