= Movement for a Democratic Society =

Left-wing umbrella organization in northern Syria

- Abbreviation: TEV-DEM
- Leader: Zalal Jagar; Kharib Heso
- Founded: 16 January 2011
- Ideology: Democratic confederalism Progressivism Factions: Libertarian socialism Communalism Feminism Jineology Kurdish nationalism Kurdish autonomy Liberal democracy Traditionalism Communism
- Political position: Left-wing
- Colors: Yellow; Red; Green
- People's Assembly: 0 / 210
- Democratic Council: 3 / 43

Party flag

The Movement for a Democratic Society (Kurdish: Tevgera Civaka Demokratîk, TEV-DEM; Arabic: حركة المجتمع الديمقراطي; Classical Syriac: ܙܘܥܐ ܕܟܢܫܐ ܕܝܡܩܪܐܛܝܐ, romanized: Zaw'o d'Kensho Demoqraṭoyo) is a left-wing umbrella organization in northern Syria founded on 16 January 2011 with the goal of organizing Syrian society under a democratic confederalist system. TEV-DEM is currently chaired by co-chairs Zalal Jagar and Kharib Heso.

== Background in the Arab Spring ==
As the Arab Spring reached Syria in early 2011, protests spread to the Kurdish areas in the north. The PYD, which had a large presence among Syrian Kurds, was actively competing with the Kurdish National Council. One of the main points of divergence related to the PYD’s stance of urging regime change, yet rejecting foreign intervention and alignment with the Syrian opposition. It claimed to offer a third way within the Syrian conflict, centred around self-defence and the primacy of non-violent solutions which did not support either the regime or the opposition, based on the organization of society and the formation of cultural, social, economic and political institutions in order to achieve "self-administration for the people".

Despite this competition, the KNC and PYD agreed to work together within the Kurdish Supreme Committee (DBK), established in 2012 in Erbil, Iraqi Kurdistan. However, as local popular support tilted towards the PYD, the KNC eventually withdrew its participation. It accused the PYD of monopolizing decision-making and harassing its activists. The PYD responded by accusing the KNC of trying to establish a competing parallel force and divide the region into competing zones of influence, risking Kurdish infighting. In November 2013 the PYD, under the TEV-DEM umbrella, unilaterally announced the creation of an interim administration for the region.

== Ideology and programme ==
By December 2013, TEV-DEM switched to a new governance model, dubbed the "democratic self-administration project", with stronger ties to the PYD's democratic confederalist ideology. This came to replace the "interim administration project" previously agreed upon with the KNC.

The Social Contract of July 2016 emphasizes multi-ethnic recognition in line with democratic confederalist ideology and dedicates articles 8–53 to basic principles of rights, representation and personal freedoms that match the provisions of the Universal Declaration of Human Rights. It also contains a number of other principles so far never applied in Syria or neighboring countries, such as the inadmissibility of civilians being tried by military courts and the abolition of the death penalty. In addition, the PYD adopts a progressive gender equality standard in its governance structures, with equal gender representation in all administrations and the establishment of a Ministry for Women’s Liberation – a standard that has been largely adhered to, including within the military.

Despite the Marxist-Leninist roots of the PYD, a drastic shift in the ideology of the movement, and Öcalan towards democratic confederalism enabled these multi-ethnic and secular components of the constitution met some fundamental requirements of Western international backers opposing the Syrian government. The model of local administration in the region has fostered a number of developments such as a focus on individual personal freedoms, and the local administration has helped to reduce the repercussions of the civil war on the population in Northern Syria by filling the vacuum left by the withdrawal of Assad’s forces from northern Syria; its nuanced position vis-à-vis the Syrian government allowed a continuation of the basic services previously rendered by the state.

== List of constituent parties of TEV-DEM's Political Committee ==
Prior to 4 September 2018, the TEV-DEM had a political committee which acted as a political coalition within the Syrian Democratic Council. Many of the parties which were previously in TEV-DEM's Political Committee are in the larger Democratic Nation List political coalition formed for the regional elections of 2017.

| Name | Leader |
|---|---|
| Democratic Union Party (PYD) | Enwer Muslim & Aisha Heso |
| Syrian Kurds' Democratic Peace Party (PADKS) | Telal Mihemed |
| Kurdistan Liberal Union Party (PYLK) | Ferhad Têlo |
| Kurdistan Democratic Party of Syria | |
| Kurdistan National Rally | |
| Communist Party of Kurdistan (KKP) | |

== Executive Committee members ==
- Eldar Khlalil (as of 2014)
- Îlham Ehmed (as of 2015)

== See also ==
- National Coordination Committee for Democratic Change
- Kurdish Supreme Committee
