= Jazira Region =

De facto region in Syria (2014–2026)

- Region of the Autonomous Administration of North and East Syria
- 2014–2026
- Flag

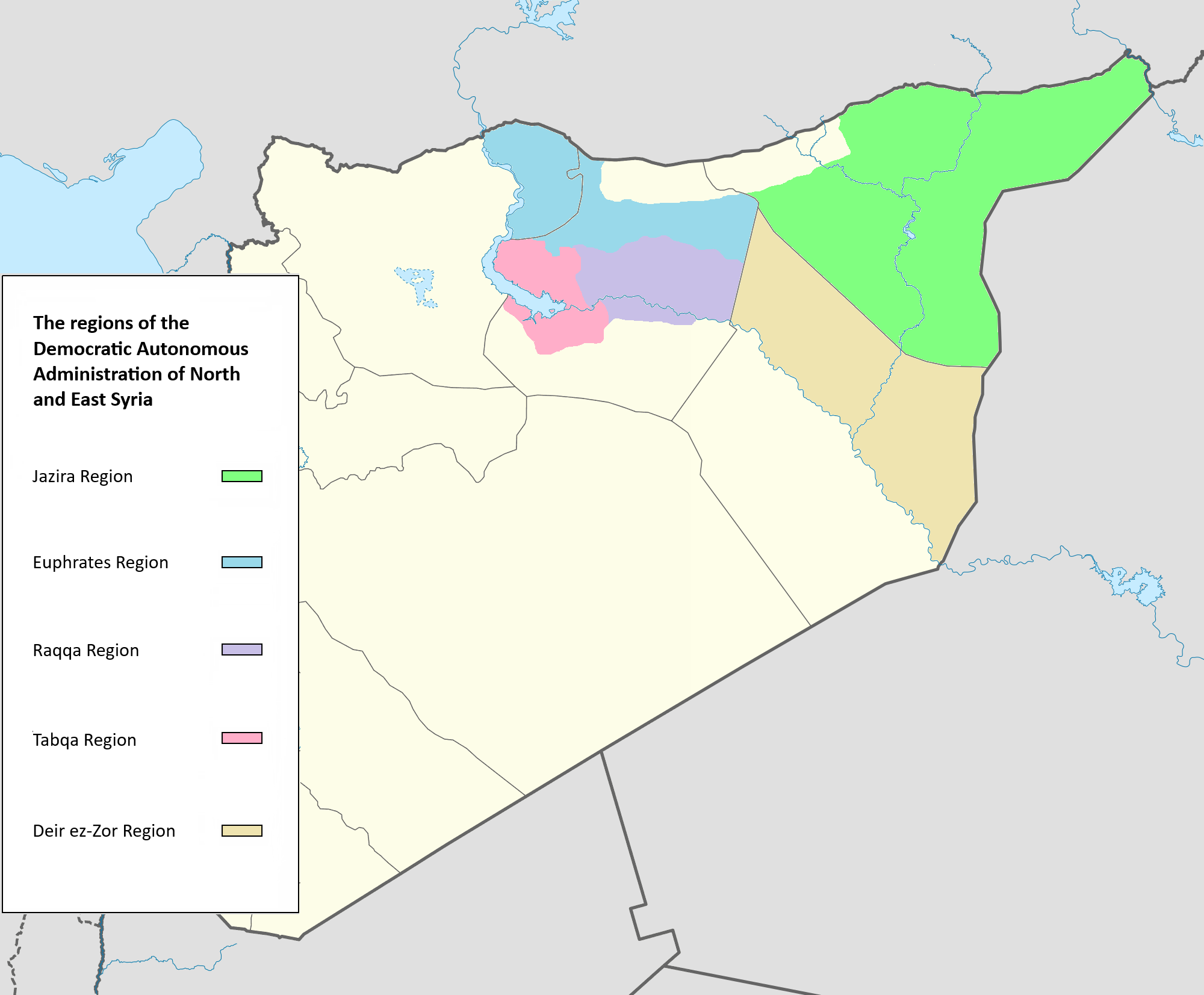
- The regions of the Autonomous Administration of North and East Syria in March 2024, with the Jazira Region shown in green
- Capital: Qamishli
- Population
  - 2011: 1,512,000
- Historical era: Syrian Civil War
  - Autonomy declared: 2014
  - Integration into the Syrian state: 2026
Preceded by	Succeeded by
Ba'athist Syria	Syrian Arab Republic
- Today part of: Syria

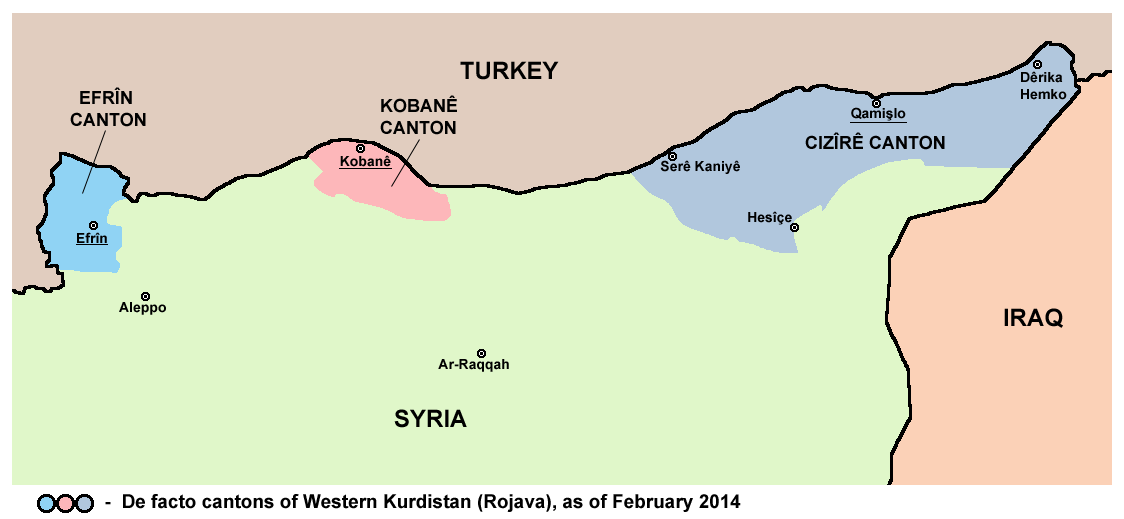
Map of Rojava cantons in February 2014

Jazira Region, formerly the Jazira Canton (Kurdish: Herêma Cizîrê; Arabic: إقليم الجزيرة; Syriac: ܦܢܝܬܐ ܕܓܙܪܬܐ, romanized: Ponyotho d'Gozarto), was the largest of the three original regions of the de facto Democratic Autonomous Administration of North and East Syria (DAANES). As part of the Rojava conflict, its democratic autonomy was officially declared on 21 January 2014. The region was located in the Al-Hasakah Governorate (formerly known as the Al-Jazira Province) of Syria. In August 2026, the region became fully integrated into the Syrian state.

According to the DAANES constitution, the city of Qamishli was the administrative center of Jazira Region. However, as parts of Qamishli were previously under the control of Syrian government forces, meetings of the autonomous region's administration took place in the nearby city of Amuda.

The region had two subordinate cantons: the Hasakah canton, consisting of the al-Hasakah area (with the Al-Shaddadi, Al-Arisha and Al-Hawl districts subordinate to it), the Al-Darbasiyah area, and the Tell Tamer area; and the Qamishli canton, consisting of the Qamishli area (with the Amûda, Tirbê Sipî, Tel Hemîs and Tel Berak districts subordinate to it) and the Derîk area (with the Girkê Legê, Tel Koçer and Çilaxa districts subordinate to it).

== Demographics ==
Jazira Region's ethnic groups included Kurds, Arabs, Assyrians, Armenians and Yazidis. While Kurdish, Arabic and Syriac were official languages, all communities had the right to teach and be taught in their native language. Religions practiced in the region were Islam, Christianity and Yazidism. The majority of the Arabs and Kurds in the region were Sunni Muslim. Between 20 and 30% of the people of Al-Hasakeh governorate were Christians of various churches and denominations.

Cities and towns with more than 10,000 inhabitants according to the 2004 Syrian census were Hasakah (188,160), Qamishli (184,231), Amuda (26,821), Al-Malikiyah (26,311), Al-Qahtaniyah (16,946), Al-Shaddadah (15,806), Al-Muabbada (15,759), Al-Sabaa wa Arbain (14,177) and Al-Manajir (12,156).

The Jazira region had been home to one of the largest concentrations of Christians in Syria. Many of the cities had been founded by Christian communities. In 1927, the region's population was recorded as follows.

Population of Al-Jazira 1927
Cities	Total Population	Christian Population
Ras al-Ayn	3,000	2,000
Al-Darbasiyah	1,500	1,000
Amuda	2,800	2,000
Qamishli	12,000	8,000
Al-Malikiyah (Dayrik)	1,900	900
Al-Qahtaniyah	3,000	2,000
Ain Diwar	1,000	600
Al-Hasakah	9,000	8,500
Tell Brak	500	500
Total	34,700	25,500

== History ==
The Kurdish tribes gradually settled in villages and cities and remained present in Jazira (modern Syria's Hasakah Governorate). Until the 19th century, Kurdistan did not include the lands of Syrian Jazira in some books. (Note: Modern Curdistan is of much greater extent than the ancient Assyria, and is composed of two parts, the Upper and Lower. In the former is the province of Ardelaw, the ancient Arropachatis, now nominally a part of Irak Ajami, and belonging to the north-west division called Al Jobal. It contains five others, namely, Betlis, the ancient Carduchia, lying to the south and south-west of the lake Van. East and south-east of Betlis is the principality of Julamerick—south-west of it, is the principality of Amadia—the fourth is Jeezera ul Omar, a city on an island in the Tigris, and corresponding to the ancient city of Bezabde—the fifth and largest is Kara Djiolan, with a capital of the same name. The pashalics of Kirkook and Solimania also comprise part of Upper Curdistan. Lower Curdistan comprises all the level tract to the east of the Tigris, and the minor ranges immediately bounding the plains, and reaching thence to the foot of the great range, which may justly be denominated the Alps of western Asia. A Dictionary of Scripture Geography (1846), John Miles.) The Treaty of Sèvres' putative Kurdistan did not include any part of today's Syria. According to McDowall, Kurds slightly outnumbered Arabs in Jazira in 1918.

Starting in 1926, the region saw an immigration of Kurds following the failure of the Sheikh Said rebellion against the Turkish authorities. It was estimated that 25,000 Kurds fled at this time to Syria. While many of the Kurds in Syria had been there for centuries, waves of Kurds fled their homes in Turkey and settled in Syria, where they were granted citizenship by the French mandate authorities.

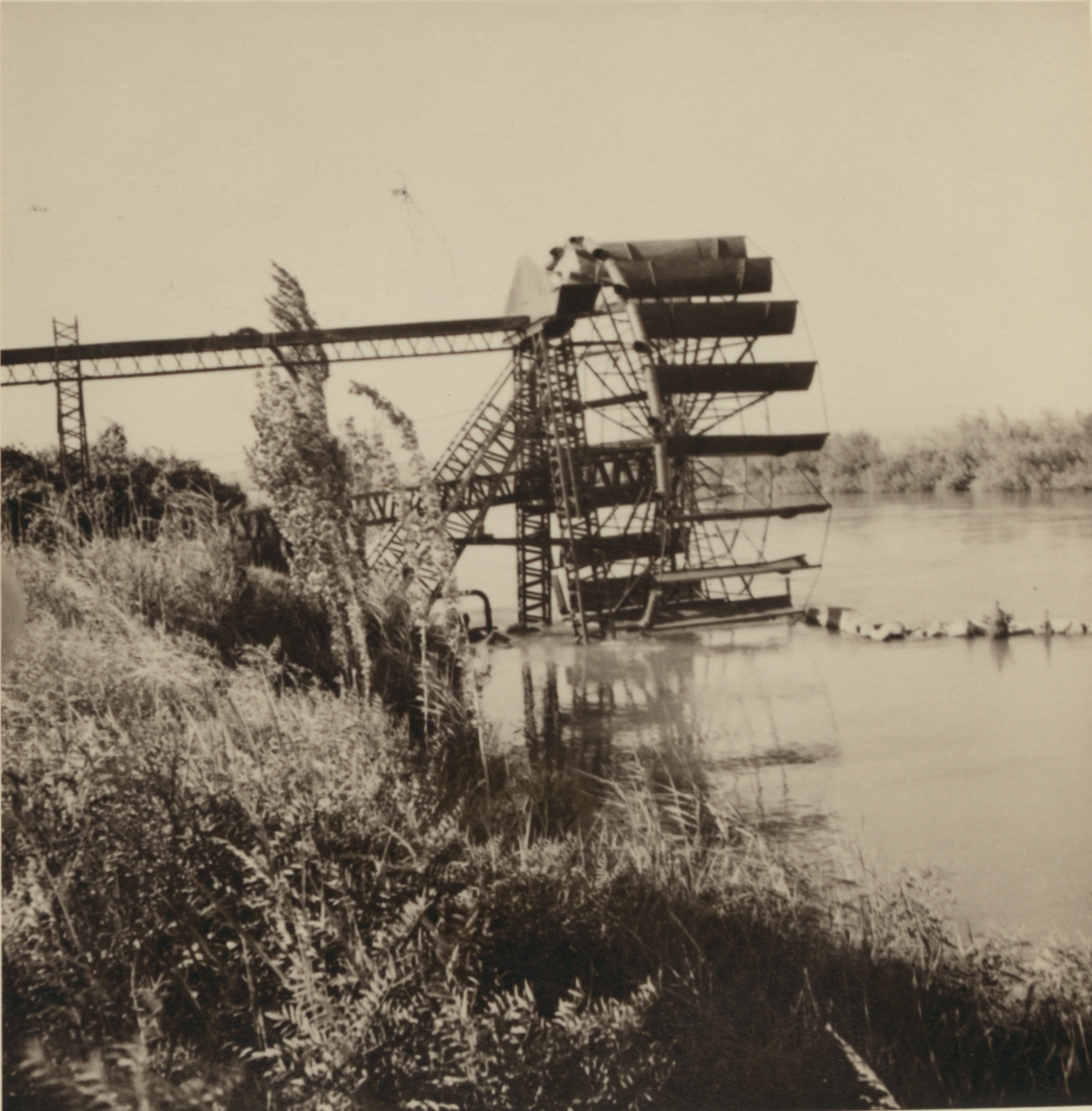
Watermill at the Khabur river, 1939

In the late 1930s, a small but vigorous separatist movement emerged in Qamishli. With some support from French Mandate officials, the movement actively lobbied for autonomy directly under French rule and separation from Syria on the grounds that the majority of the inhabitants were not Arabs. Syrian nationalists saw the movement as a profound threat to their eventual rule. The Syrian nationalists allied with local Arab Shammal tribal leader and Kurdish tribes. They together attacked the Christian movement in many towns and villages. Local Kurdish tribes that were allies of the Shammar tribe sacked and burned the Assyrian town of Amuda. In 1941, the Assyrian community of al-Malikiyah was subjected to a vicious assault. Even though the assault failed, Assyrians felt threatened and left in large numbers, and the immigration of Kurds from Turkey to the area converted al-Malikiyah, al-Darbasiyah and Amuda into Kurdish-majority cities.

According to the French report to the League of Nations in 1937, the population of Jazira consisted of 82,000 Kurdish villagers, 42,000 Muslim Arab pastoralists, and 32,000 Christian town dwellers (Assyrians and Armenians).

Between 1932 and 1939, a Kurdish-Christian autonomy movement emerged in Jazira. The demands of the movement were autonomous status similar to the Sanjak of Alexandretta, the protection of French troops, promotion of Kurdish language in schools and hiring of Kurdish officials. The movement was led by Michel Dome, mayor of Qamishli, Hanna Hebe, general vicar for the Syriac-Catholic Patriarch of Jazira, and the Kurdish notable Hajo Agha. Some Arab tribes supported the autonomists while others sided with the central government. In the legislative elections of 1936, autonomist candidates won all the parliamentary seats in Jazira and Jarabulus, while the nationalist Arab movement known as the National Bloc won the elections in the rest of Syria. After victory, the National Bloc pursued an aggressive policy toward the autonomists. The Jazira governor appointed by Damascus intended to disarm the population and encourage the settlement of Arab farmers from Aleppo, Homs and Hama in Jazira. In July 1937, armed conflict broke out between the Syrian police and the supporters of the movement. As a result, the governor and a significant portion of the police force fled the region and the rebels established a local autonomous administration in Jazira. In August 1937, a number of Assyrians in Amuda were killed by a pro-Damascus Kurdish chief. In September 1938, Hajo Agha chaired a general conference in Jazira and appealed to France for self-government. The new French High Commissioner, Gabriel Puaux, dissolved parliament and created autonomous administrations for Jabal Druze, Latakia and Jazira in 1939, which lasted until 1943.

== Politics and administration ==
=== Legislative Assembly ===
All four main ethnic communities (Kurds, Arabs, Armenians and Assyrians) were represented in the 101-seat Legislative Assembly. The prime minister (sometimes referred to as president) of Jazira Canton was the Kurdish Akram Hesso, with Arab Hussein Taza Al Azam and Assyrian Elizabeth Gawrie serving as deputy prime ministers (sometimes referred to as vice-presidents). There also appeared to be co-governor/co-president positions, with tribal leader and Al-Sanadid Forces leader Humaydi Daham al-Hadi and Hediye Yusuf serving as co-governors of the region.

=== Notable legislation ===
In January 2016, Jazira Canton introduced a "self-defense duty" conscription law for its self-defense forces, including an avoidance fee for residents of military service age who had moved to Europe, requiring them to pay $200 for each year of absence upon their return.

In September 2015, the legislative council passed the Law for the Management and Protection of the Assets of the Refugees and the Absentees, under which the owner of an immovable property lost their title when they did not make personal use of the property. In particular, persistent opposition was voiced among the Assyrian community in Jazira Region, as their community was disproportionately affected by the measure, due to both a high degree of land ownership and a particularly high share of outbound civil war refugees. Assyrian organizations in the region published several statements accusing the administration of ‘seizing private property’, ‘demographic changing’, and even ‘ethnic cleansing’. Assets seized from Assyrians under the law were reportedly later handed over to Syriac churches.

=== Police ===
Security was maintained by the Asayish police force and its Assyrian counterpart, the Sutoro. During the civil war, Syrian government loyalists controlled only a number of demarcated neighborhoods in Qamishli. The government-held areas in Qamishli included the city's airport, train station, border crossing, governor's palace, and many other residential neighborhoods containing various government buildings, such as hospitals and fire departments. These areas were taken under the control of the DAANES government in December 2024.

=== List of executive officers ===
Name	Party	Office	Elected	Notes
Akram Hesso	PYD	Prime Minister	2014	
Elizabeth Gawrie	SUP	Deputy Prime Minister	2014	
Hussein Taza Al Azam	PB-ASD	Deputy Prime Minister	2014	
Abulkarim Omer	N/A	Foreign Minister	2015	Replaced Salih Gedo
Abdulkarim Sarokhan	N/A	Minister of Defense	2014	
Kanaan Barakat	N/A	Interior Minister	2014	
Abdulmenar Yoxo	SUP	Minister of Regional Commissions, Councils and Planning	2014	
Emziye Muhammed	PB-ASD	Minister of Finance	2014	
Dijwar Ehmed Axa	N/A	Minister of Labor and Social Security	2014	
Mihemed Salih Abo	N/A	Minister of Education	2014	
Abdulmecid Sebri	N/A	Minister of Agriculture; Minister of Health	2014	
Siham Kiryo	SUP	Minister of Trade and Economy	2014	
Rezan Gulo	N/A	Minister of Martyrs’ Families	2014	
Mehawan Mihemed Hesen	N/A	Minister of Culture	2014	
Mihemed Hesen Ubeyd	N/A	Minister of Transportation	2014	
Mihemed İsa Fatimi	N/A	Minister of Youth and Sport	2014	
Lokman Ehme	N/A	Minister of the Environment and Tourism	2014	
Şex Mihemed Qadiri	N/A	Minister of Religious Affairs	2014	
Emine Umer	N/A	Minister of Women and Family Affairs	2014	
Senherid Basom	SUP	Minister of Human Rights	2014	
Temer Hesen Cahid	N/A	Minister of Industry and Commerce	2014	
Salal Mihemed	N/A	Minister of Information and Communication	2014	
Abdulhamit Bekir	N/A	Minister of Justice	2014	
Süleyman Xelek	N/A	Minister of Electricity, Industry and Natural Resources	2014	

== Economy ==
The economy of Jazira Canton was mainly based on agriculture, which accounted for 17 percent of Syria's agricultural production, particularly wheat and cotton, which were grown there in abundance. Being the "bread basket" of Syria, wheat production before the Syrian Civil War had been around 1.8 million tons per year, but at the height of the war it had dropped as low as 0.5 million tons. The Economy Committee promoted varied vegetable and fruit cultivation instead of the monoculture of wheat; in Amuda, a centre to develop seedlings had been established. The development of a greenhouse economy was promoted. In Al-Qahtaniyah, an ecological village was founded so that the local Rojavan population could acquire experience in ecology from international volunteers. By 2020, 40 workers' cooperatives had been established, with between five and ten families each. Eighteen were organized by Aborija Jin of the Kongra Star, an organization focused on women's activities in the DAANES.

The only significant industrial area was in Hasakah.

Jazira Region was home to several oil fields, among them Syria's best-producing one at Rmelan. As of summer 2016, oil output in Jazira Region was estimated at 40,000 barrels per day. Some people worked at primitive oil refineries, which caused health hazards and pollution. The oil wealth, in combination with the economic blockade of the DAANES from the adjacent territories controlled by Turkey and, partially, the KRG, resulted in a distortion of relative prices; petrol cost only half as much as bottled water.

Electricity was supplied by Tishrin Dam on the Euphrates, within Euphrates Region; apart from that, electricity was produced by diesel generators.

=== Taxation ===
In July 2017, Jazira Region became the first region in the Democratic Autonomous Administration of North and East Syria to introduce an income tax, with citizens' income of above 100,000 Syrian pounds (at the time equivalent to around 200 U.S. dollars) per month being taxed.

== Education ==
Like in the other Rojava regions, primary education in the public schools was initially provided through mother-tongue instruction, either in Kurdish or Arabic, with the aim of bilingualism in Kurdish and Arabic in secondary schooling. Curricula were a topic of continuous debate between the regions' Boards of Education and the Syrian central government in Damascus, which partly paid the teachers. In August 2016, the Ourhi Centre in the city of Qamishli was founded by the Assyrian community to educate teachers in order to make the Syriac language an additional language to be taught in public schools in Jazira Region, which then started with the 2016/17 academic year. With that academic year, the Rojava Education Committee stated that "three curriculums have replaced the old one, to include teaching in three languages: Kurdish, Arabic and Syriac”.

The federal, regional and local administrations in Rojava placed much emphasis on promoting libraries and educational centers to facilitate learning and social and artistic activities. One cited example was the 2015-established Nahawand Center for Developing Children’s Talents in Amuda.

The Jazira Region Board of Education operated two public institutions of higher education, the University of Rojava and the Mesopotamian Social Sciences Academy, both in the city of Qamishli. Jazira Region also housed a third one, the Hasakah campus of Al-Furat University, which was operated by the Damascus government's Ministry of Higher Education.

== See also ==
- Federalization of Syria
- Rojava conflict
- Democratic Autonomous Administration of North and East Syria
- Afrin Region
- Euphrates Region
- Assyrians in Syria
- Armenians in Syria
- Kurds in Syria
