= Human rights in the Democratic Autonomous Administration of North and East Syria =

Democratic Autonomous Administration of North and East Syria

The Democratic Autonomous Administration of North and East Syria was a de facto autonomous region of Syria that emerged from 2012 onwards during the Syrian civil war, particularly during the Rojava conflict. The final administration, before its integration into the Syrian state in 2026, emphasized gender equality and pluralistic tolerance of religious and cultural diversity.

== Historic background ==
=== Early 20th century ===
The demographics of this area underwent a huge shift in the early part of the 20th century. Some Circassian, Kurdish and Chechen tribes cooperated with the Ottoman (Turkish) authorities in the Armenian and Assyrian genocides in Upper Mesopotamia, between 1914 and 1920, with further attacks on unarmed fleeing civilians conducted by local Arab militias. Many Assyrians fled to Syria during the genocide and settled mainly in Al-Jazira Province. Starting in 1926, the region saw another immigration of Kurds following the failure of the Sheikh Said rebellion against the new Republic of Turkey. While there have been Kurds in Syria for centuries, waves of Kurds fled their homes in Turkey and settled in Syria, where they were granted citizenship by the French mandate authorities. In the 1930s and 1940s, the region saw several failed autonomy movements.

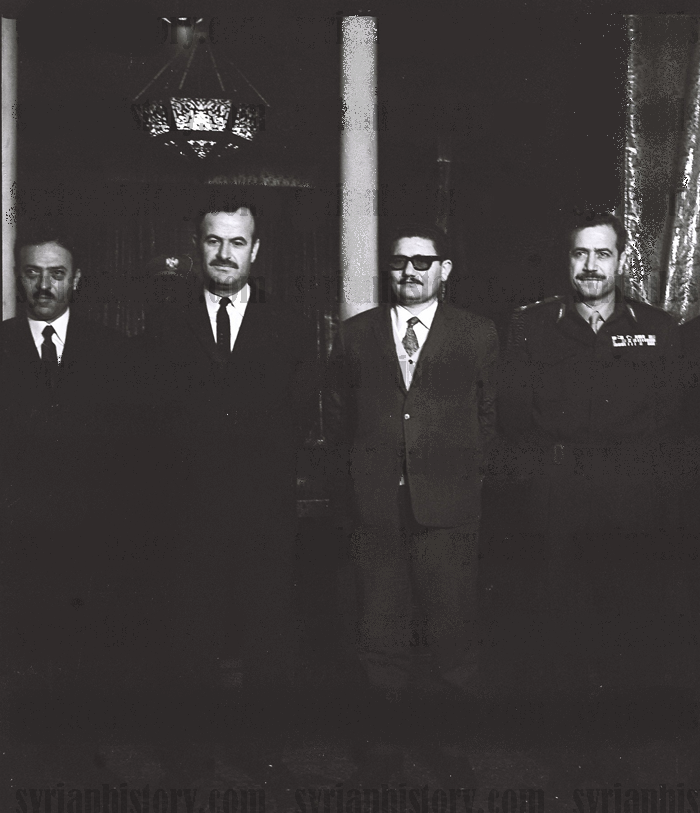
Baath party chairman and President of Syria Hafez al-Assad and his top officials in 1971 (From left to right: Parliament Speaker Ahmad al-Khatib, President Hafez al-Assad, Deputy Secretary-General of the Baath Party Abdullah al-Ahmar, Defense Minister Mustafa Tlass)

=== General human rights situation under Baathist rule ===
The situation for human rights in Syria has been considered exceptionally poor among international observers for generations. At the onset of the Syrian Civil War in 2011, Syria's human rights situation remained among the worst in the world. No improvement could be observed since Bashar al-Assad took over in 2000 from his father Hafez al-Assad, who had acquired power in a 1970 coup. The Middle East director at Human Rights Watch (HRW) concluded that "whether Assad wanted to be a reformer but was hampered by an entrenched old guard or has been just another Arab ruler unwilling to listen to criticism, the outcome for Syria's people is the same: no freedom, no rights. Assad's record after 10 years is that he has done virtually nothing to improve his country's human rights record."

Particularly dire was the situation with respect to political rights. Many politicians of the region have in the past been political prisoners of the Syrian government.

One area where the Baathist government did advance human rights in Northern Syria was in social and economic rights. Agrarian reform mitigated quasi-feudal structures built on large land ownership in both traditional Arab Bedouin and traditional Kurdish society.

=== Arabization in Northern Syria ===
All governments since the independence of Syria in 1946, particularly the Baath governments since 1963, have pursued an often brutal policy of Arabization, leading to grave human rights violations in the ethnically diverse region of Northern Syria. In his report for the 12th session of the UN Human Rights Council titled Persecution and Discrimination against Kurdish Citizens in Syria, the United Nations High Commissioner for Human Rights held:

Successive Syrian governments continued to adopt a policy of ethnic discrimination and national persecution against Kurds, completely depriving them of their national, democratic and human rights — an integral part of human existence. The government imposed ethnically-based programs, regulations and exclusionary measures on various aspects of Kurds' lives — political, economic, social and cultural.

==== Denying Kurds citizenship ====
There have been various instances of the Syrian government denying citizenship to ethnic Kurds on the pretext that they have fled to Syria after the failure of Sheikh Said rebellion during the French Mandate of Syria. The largest of these instances was a consequence of a census in 1962, which was conducted for exactly this purpose. 120,000 Kurds saw their Syrian citizenship arbitrarily taken away and became "stateless". They were not allowed to vote, own property or be employed by the government. They received red identification cards stating they were not Syrian citizens. This status was passed on to the children of a "stateless" Kurdish father. In 2010, Human Rights Watch (HRW) estimated the number of such "stateless" ethnic Kurds in Syria at 300,000.

With losing their citizenship, the people concerned also lost many rights under the law. In its 1996 report Syria: The silenced Kurds, HRW described the consequences as "they are not permitted to own land, housing or businesses. They cannot be employed at government agencies and state-owned enterprises, and cannot practice as doctors or engineers. They are not eligible for food subsidies or admission to public hospitals. They may not legally marry Syrian citizens" and "they are not issued passports or other travel documents, and thus may not legally leave or return to Syria."

==== Suppressing Kurdish language and culture ====
The Kurdish language was not officially recognized, it had no place in public schools and was outlawed at the workplace. Beginning in 1967, school books excluded any mention of Kurdish existence. According to Syria's Kurds: History, Politics and Society by Dr. Jordi Tejel, "with the increase in literate children in the Kurdish regions, a tight surveillance system was established there, following the example of the Turks, by means of 'spies', to stop the children from speaking Kurdish among themselves. Children discovered in flagrant 'defiance' could be physically punished." While other ethnic minorities in Syria (like Armenians, Circassians and Assyrians) were permitted to open private schools for the education of their children, Kurds were not.

Neither children nor businesses could be given Kurdish names. Books, music, videos and other material could not be published in Kurdish language. Expressions of Kurdish identity like songs and folk dances were outlawed and frequently prosecuted under a purpose-built criminal law against "weakening national sentiment". Celebrations of the Nowruz holiday were often constrained by imposed limitations.

==== Discrimination against ethnic Kurdish citizens ====
Ethnic Kurdish citizens of Syria, no matter if deprived of citizenship or not, were subject to discrimination under the law regarding the right to own real estate. Ethnic Kurdish students and employees were frequently expelled from government institutions without any reason other than their ethnicity apparent or given. In particular among teacher training institutions, such expulsion because of Kurdish ethnicity was the rule.

The religion of Yezidis, a Kurdish-speaking ethnoreligious group estimated at 70,000 in Syria, was not recognized by the state. Thus Yezidis were not taught their own religion in public schools, but were forced to submit to teachings of Islam. In personal status matters, they could not resort to civil courts, but were also denied religious courts of their own.

==== Confiscation of Kurdish land and settlement by Arabs ====
In 1973 the Syrian authorities confiscated 750 square kilometers of fertile agricultural land in Al-Hasakah Governorate, which were owned and cultivated by tens of thousands of Kurdish citizens, and gave it to Arab families brought in from other provinces. In 2007 in another such scheme in Al-Hasakah Governorate 6,000 square kilometers around Al-Malikiyah were granted to Arab families, while tens of thousands of Kurdish inhabitants of the villages concerned were evicted. These and other expropriations of ethnic Kurdish citizens followed a deliberate masterplan, called "Arab Belt initiative", attempting to depopulate the resource-rich Jazeera of its ethnic Kurdish inhabitants and settle ethnic Arabs there.

== Human rights issues with Syrian Civil War armed forces in the region ==
=== Syrian Government ===
At the dawn of the Syrian Civil War, media reported that Syria President Assad had decreed to grant Syrian citizenship to an estimated 220,000 of the estimated 300,000 ethnic Kurdish de facto citizens of Syria who were "stateless" as a consequence of the 1962 census.

After the outbreak of the Syrian Civil War, the government forces withdrew from most of the Rojava region in 2012, leaving control to local militias, notable exceptions until today being the airport and the area south of Qamishli and the city center of as well as a military base close to Al-Hasakah. Thus while all issues associated with the Syrian Baathist government – its human rights record considered "among the worst" in the world by Human rights Watch – persisted within these small areas, their extent was limited. However, during the Qamishli clashes of April 2016, Syrian Army artillery resorted to indiscriminate shelling of civilian neighbourhoods in the city, causing destruction and injury and death of civilians.

In an August 2016 report, Amnesty International claimed that nearly 18,000 people have died in government prisons in Syria since the beginning of the uprising in 2011, a figure that includes deaths in the prisons of government enclaves in Rojava, namely in the prisons of Al-Hasakah until the YPG overtake capture (and subsequent closure) of the juvenile prison from ISIL during the Battle of Hasakah throughout the summer of 2015, and the Syrian Democratic Forces (SDF) overtake of the central prison (and subsequent closure) from the Government in Battle of al-Hasakah in August 2016, as well as the prison of Qamishli until its overtake by the SDF during the Qamishli clashes (and subsequent closure) in April 2016.

=== Syrian opposition militias ===
Most opposition militias — outside of the NES-associated Syrian Democratic Forces umbrella — are not secular but follow Islamist ideologies, causing the respective human rights issues in areas under their control. In addition, there often is an attitude of chauvinist discrimination against ethnicities other than Arab among such militias and their political arms.

A report by the UN Human Rights Council alleged that since July 2013, Al-Nusra Front, at times in coordination with other armed groups, carried out a series of killings of Kurdish civilians in Al Youssoufiyah, Qamishli and Al-Asadia in Al-Hasakah Governorate, the Jazira Region. During a raid by groups under the flag of the FSA, ISIL, the Islamic Front and Al-Nusra battalions, fighters allegedly killed a Kurdish Yazidi man in Al-Asadia who refused to convert to Islam.

A recurring human rights issue has been the indiscriminate shelling of civilian population centers under NES control by Syrian opposition militias (both from within and outside of the National Coalition for Syrian Revolutionary and Opposition Forces umbrella). Such shelling has multiple times caused destruction of property and injury and death of civilians in Afrin Canton, and particularly severe destruction of property and injury and death of civilians in the SDF-controlled Sheikh Maqsood neighborhood of Aleppo. In May 2016, Amnesty International's regional director suggested that the attacks on Sheikh Maqsood constitute "war crimes". In mid-June 2016 the US-supported Syrian Democratic Forces and Russia accused the opposition militias of causing the death of over 40 civilians in the month, and an accumulated 1,000 civilian deaths, through indiscriminate shelling of Sheikh Maqsood.

After their capture of the town of Jarabulus from ISIL in September 2016, opposition militias of the FSA labeled Sultan Murad Division published pictures of themselves torturing four YPG members prisoners of war, who were captured by the rebel group while, according to YPG claims, trying to evacuate civilians.

According to an official in the Kurdish National Council's Unity Party on 29 March 2017, "The Syrian opposition are against federalism and constitutional Kurdish national rights, and they want to delay discussing Kurdish rights in the future."

=== Islamic State of Iraq and the Levant ===
Flag of the Islamic State

The Islamic State of Iraq and the Levant (ISIL) has in 2014 and 2015 held much and at times most of the territory under the concept of the region. The state of human rights in such ISIL-controlled territories has been criticised by many political, religious and other organisations and individuals. The United Nations Commission on Human Rights has stated that ISIL "seeks to subjugate civilians under its control and dominate every aspect of their lives through terror, indoctrination, and the provision of services to those who obey". The ISIL barbarism hit the region in a particular way, for three reasons: First there are significant non-Muslim population groups (Assyrians, Yazidis), second the decidedly secular and women empowering character of the region made it a textbook antagonist for ISIL, third due to the geographical proximity to the ISIL heartland as well as the vigor and success of its self-defence militias, the region came to be considered its special nemesis by ISIL.

In June 2014, after the Islamic State of Iraq and the Levant (ISIL) captured the border city of Tell Abyad, ISIL fighters made an announcement from the minarets of the local mosques that all Kurds had to leave Tell Abyad on or else be killed. Thousands of civilians, including Turkmen and Arab families fled on 21 July. Its fighters systematically looted and destroyed the property of Kurds, and in some cases, resettled displaced Arab Sunni families from the Qalamoun area (Rif Damascus), Dayr Az-Zawr and Raqqa in abandoned Kurdish homes.

On 23 February 2015, in response to a major Kurdish offensive in the Al-Hasakah Governorate, ISIL abducted 150 Assyrians from villages near Tell Tamer in northeastern Syria, after launching a large offensive in the region. According to US diplomat Alberto M. Fernandez, of the 232 of the Assyrians kidnapped in the ISIS attack on the Assyrian Christian farming villages on the banks of the Khabur River in Northeast Syria, 51 were children and 84 women. "Most of them remain in captivity with one account claiming that ISIS is demanding $22 million (or roughly $100,000 per person) for their release." On 8 October, ISIL released a video showing three of the Assyrian men kidnapped in Khabur being executed. It was reported that 202 of the 253 kidnapped Assyrians were still in captivity, each one with a demanded ransom of $100,000.

In June 2015 at least 220 Kurdish civilians were massacred in mass killings by ISIL fighters in their homes or killed by the group's rockets or snipers by an attack on the Syrian Kurdish town of Kobani on the Turkish border, which is one of the worst massacres carried out by ISIS in Syria. Women and children were among the bodies found inside houses and on the streets of Kobane. Also in a nearby village, IS reportedly shot dead at least 20 civilians, including women and children. The Syrian Observatory for Human Rights said that ISIS fired at everything that moved.

During the June 2016 Manbij offensive with global media attention, reports on ISIL human rights violations from areas captured by the Syrian Democratic Forces drew a picture of ISIL tyranny in the area (much of which had briefly been under the region's control in 2013), in particular violating elementary human rights of women: "They had imprisoned women at home. If our children went outdoors we were not able to bring them back. If we did not cover our face while going outside, we would be lashed." "If someone tried to criticise their behaviour, they would sew his mouth shut for a while, or they would cut his head off and hang him up for everyone to see," another witness who had lived under ISIS rule told AFP. "They burned all of our schoolbooks and they banned studying. They started forcing us to take religious courses that taught us that Kurds, teachers, and other religious scholars are all infidels," a student reported. On 13 June it was reported that before their withdrawal from the countryside of Manbij, ISIS jihadis broke into civilians' houses in dozens of villages, killing the men and raping the women.

In July 2016, ISIL militants undertook two raids against villages in southern Kobani Canton, and while the second was foiled by YPG forces from its outset, the first had succeeded in temporarily capturing a village of mainly ethnic Kurdish inhabitants, slaughtering dozens of women and children with knives. An ISIL terror bombing in Qamishli in late July claimed more than 50 civilian lives. In October 2016, an ISIL suicide terror bombing at a Kurdish wedding in Hasakah took dozens of lives.

=== Syrian Democratic Forces ===
The People's Protection Units (YPG) was the most important militia of Kurdish communities and cantons, assuming control of territory vacated by Syrian government forces, capturing territory from ISIL and to a lesser degree from Syrian opposition militias. The YPG initially was almost exclusively ethnic Kurdish, later opened itself and increasingly recruited citizens of other ethnicities (Arabs, Turkmen) as well as international volunteers. Like all militias in the context of the Autonomous Administration of North and East Syria, the YPG since October 2015 operate under the umbrella of the Syrian Democratic Forces.

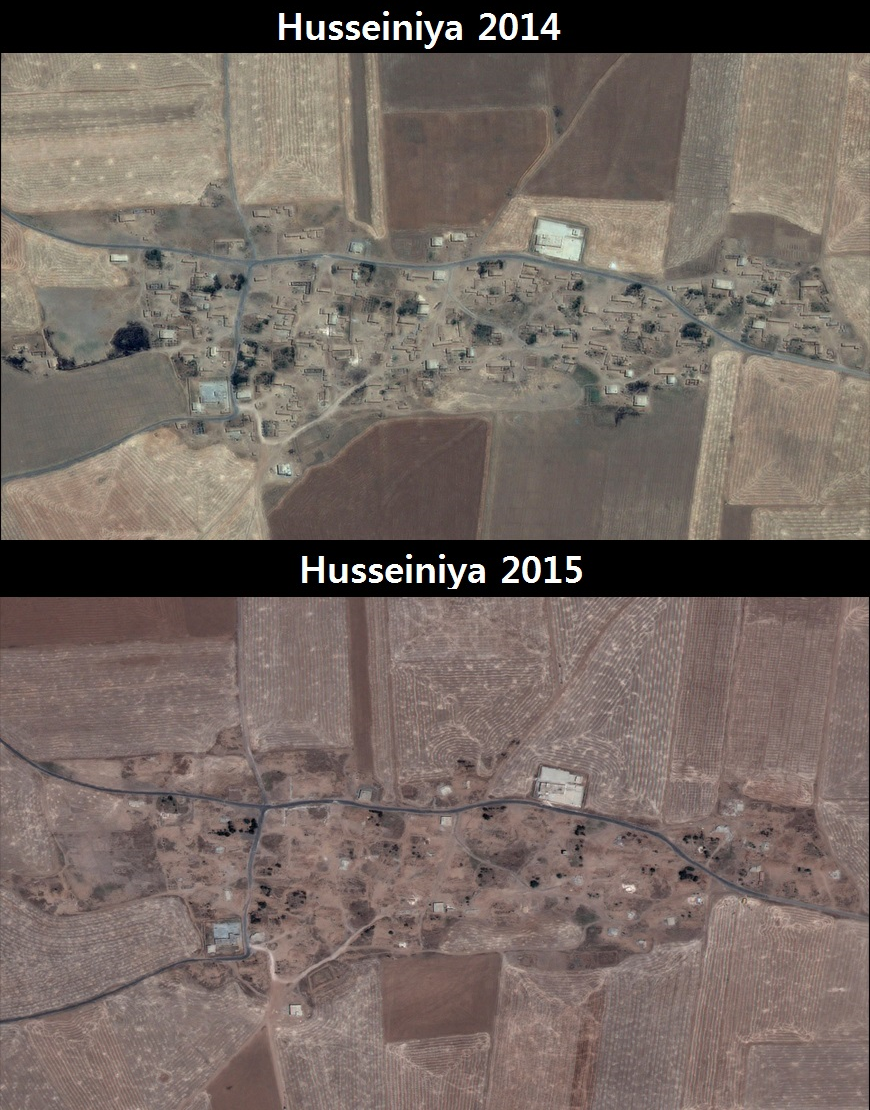
Satellite images of the village of Husseiniya in 2014 and 2015, allegedly leveled by the YPG.

During the Syrian Civil War, YPG members have been accused of human rights violations against Kurdish, Arab and Turkmen communities. The allegations include kidnappings of suspected persons, torture, ethnic cleansing, and expulsion. In May 2015, local sources accused the YPG of killing 20 civilians, including two children, five women and a pharmacist in the village of Abo Shakhat and the destruction of several villages in Tal Tamer and Ras al- Ayn, saying the YPG claimed that the owners were ISIL supporters. In an October 2015 report, Amnesty International alleged cases of forced displacement, demolition of homes, and the seizure and destruction of property. According to Amnesty International, some displaced people said that the YPG has targeted their villages on the accusation of supporting ISIS; some villagers revealed the existence of a small minority that might have sympathized with the group. The village of Husseiniya was completely razed to the ground leaving 14 out of 225 houses standing. "In some cases, entire villages have been demolished, apparently in retaliation for the perceived support of their Arab or Turkmen residents for the group that calls itself the Islamic State (IS) or other non-state armed groups." In March 2017 the United Nations' Independent International Commission of Inquiry on the Syrian Arab Republic refuted Amnesty International's reports of ethnic cleansing.

The YPG also rejected the charges and released a report denying the accusations made in the Amnesty report, criticizing the methodology used and the validity of the testimonies given by interviewees. YPG spokesman Redur Xelil said: "Very simply, this is a false allegation," and PYD co-chairman Salih Muslim strictly denied the Amnesty International claims.

Several similar reports were being during the civil war from international organizations, including Amnesty International and international organizations have accused SDF forces of committing ethnic cleansing in Arab areas they were capturing from other war factions. The most recent accusation was made on 8 May 2019 by Russia's foreign minister Sergey Lavrov who said:

The US attempts to resettle Kurds in the areas where Arab tribes have always lived historically is a very bad process and a direct way to separatism and the breakup of Syria.

In June 2014, Human Rights Watch criticized the YPG for accepting minors into their ranks, picking up on multiple earlier reports of teenage fighters serving in the YPG, with a report by the United Nations Secretary General stating that 24 minors under age of 18 had been recruited by YPG, with 124 having been recruited by the Free Syrian Army and 5 by the Syrian Arab Army. In response, the YPG and YPJ signed the Geneva Call Deed of Commitment protecting children in armed conflict, prohibiting sexual violence and against gender discrimination in July 2014, and Kurdish security forces (YPG and Asayish) began receiving human rights training from Geneva Call and other international organisations with the YPG pledging publicly to demobilize all fighters under 18 within a month and began to enact disciplinary measures against commanders of the units that had involved in corruption and accepting recruit under age of 18 to their ranks. In October 2015 the YPG demobilized 21 minors from the military service in its ranks.

In response to allegations of human rights violation from within its ranks, the YPG in September 2015 asked for and received human rights training from Geneva Call and other international organizations for its forces. Rovaja's de facto foreign minister Sinam Mohamed in June 2016 acknowledged that there have been reports of some abuses by YPG forces and that she believes this does happen from time to time, however pointed to the human rights training that YPG forces since receive.

In a June 2015 interview by Society for Threatened Peoples with the head of the Syrian Observatory for Human Rights, Rami Abdulrahman stated that there was "no 'ethnic cleansing' in Tel Abyad against the Turkmen and Arabic population" and that existing restrictions were temporary and because of the danger of mines and remaining ISIL fighters in some villages. Michael M. Gunter in October 2015 called the Amnesty report "very partial and distorted", adding that it would "not do justice to the PYD's efforts to protect not only Kurds but also Arabs against the depredations of ISIS (...) The PYD and its YPG fighting units have gone out of their way not to kill or displace the population."

In 2017, the U.N. Independent International Commission of Inquiry released a report that stated that the commission "found no evidence to substantiate claims that YPG or SDF forces ever targeted Arab communities on the basis of ethnicity, nor that YPG cantonal authorities systematically sought to change the demographic composition of territories under their control through the commission of violations directed against any particular ethnic group".

=== Turkey ===
Turkey is hostile towards the Autonomous Administration of North and East Syria (NES), since Turkey claims that the PYD, the political party ruling the region is connected to the PKK and it fears that the autonomous region would encourage increased unrest and calls for autonomy among the Kurdish population within Turkey. There have been claims that Turkey has been giving material support to Islamist rebel groups including ISIL who would fight the region. Turkey has also shelled population centers in the region, causing property damage but also injury and death of civilians. Turkey has also been accused of actively supporting the indiscriminate shelling of civilian population centers under the region's control by opposition militias, causing 1,000 civilian deaths in the Sheikh Maqsood neighbourhood of Aleppo alone.

Frequently accusations are made from local sources as well as the region's authorities against Turkish border guards shooting to kill at civilians at the border. In one of the most prominent of such accusations, a report from ANF on 28 September 2016 alleged that "Turkish soldiers kill 17 civilians on the border of the region in two days", building on a report of the Syrian Observatory for Human Rights from the previous day of 12 civilians killed. Concerning one of the events in these two days, SANA reported that "local sources told SANA reporter in Hasaka that the Turkish army opened fire on a number of civilians at Kahyla village which is located between the cities of Ras al-Ayn and Tal Abyad, killing nine civilians including children, and injuring others. Some of the injured persons, who were rushed to Ras al-Ayn city for treatment, confirmed that Turkish soldiers fired indiscriminately at them."

In October 2016, the co-chairman of the regions's leading Democratic Union Party (PYD), Salih Muslim, has accused Turkey of ethnic cleansing in the border area between Azaz and Jarabulus which at the time is occupied by Turkish-backed opposition rebels, saying it has driven thousands of Kurds from their land in villages near the border.

In August 2018, Amnesty International said that Turkish forces in the northern Syrian city of Afrin are giving Syrian militias "free rein" to commit serious human rights abuses, among them torture, forced disappearances and looting.

== Human rights under the region's administration ==
The socio-political transformations of the "Rojava Revolution" with their advancing an ambitious human rights agenda have inspired much attention in international media, both in mainstream media and in dedicated progressive leftist media.

=== Human rights development in the legal system ===
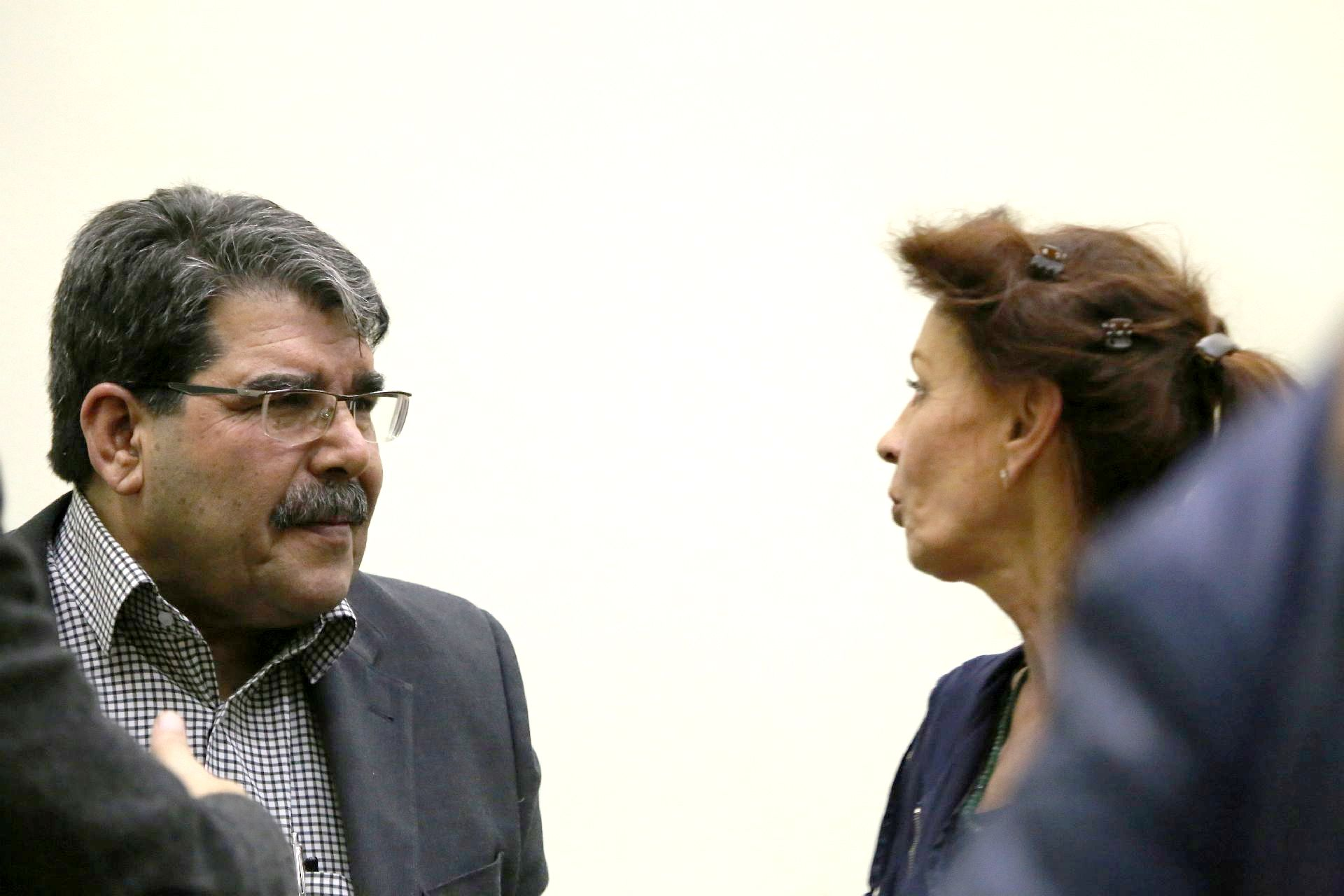
Salih Muslim, co-chairman of Rojava's leading Democratic Union Party (PYD) with Ulla Jelpke at Rosa Luxemburg Foundation in Berlin

==== Constitutional order ====
According to the 2014 Constitution of North and East Syria, the administration of the de facto autonomous region is committed to international law regarding human rights, explicitly incorporating the Universal Declaration of Human Rights, the International Covenant on Civil and Political Rights, the International Covenant on Economic, Social and Cultural Rights, as well as other internationally recognized human rights conventions. It is extraordinary for the Middle East in its explicit affirmation of minority rights and gender equality and a form of direct democracy known as democratic confederalism. The Cairo Declaration on Human Rights in Islam, which limits the concept of human rights and to which Syria is a signatory state, does not apply in the region. In July 2016, a draft for an updated constitution was presented, taking up the general progressive and democratic confederalist principles of the 2014 constitution, mentioning all ethnic groups living in the region, addressing their cultural, political and linguistic rights.

==== Legal system ====
The new justice systems in the region reflects democratic confederalism. At the local level, citizens create Peace and Consensus Committees, which make group decisions on minor criminal cases and disputes as well as in separate committees resolve issues of specific concern to women's rights like domestic violence and marriage. At the regional level, citizens (who are not required to be trained jurists) are elected by the regional People's Councils to serve on seven-member People's Courts. At the next level are four Appeals Courts, composed of trained jurists. The court of last resort is the Regional Court, which serves the region as a whole. Distinct and separate from this system, the Constitutional Court renders decisions on compatibility of acts of government and legal proceedings with the constitution of the region (called the Social Contract).

The civil laws of Syria are valid in the region, as far as they do not conflict with the constitution of the region. One notable example for amendment is personal status law, which in Syria is still based on Sharia and applied by Sharia Courts, where the strictly secular region proclaims absolute equality of women under the law and a ban on forced marriage as well as polygamy was introduced, while underage marriage was outlawed as well. For the first time in Syrian history, civil marriage is being allowed and promoted, a significant move towards a secular open society and intermarriage between people of different religious backgrounds.

==== Criminal law and police ====
A new criminal justice approach has been implemented that emphasizes restoration over retribution. The death penalty has been abolished. Prisons are housing mostly those charged with terrorist activity related to ISIL and other extremist groups, although there are also frequent reports of supporters of Kurdish opposition parties opposed to PYD being arrested or even kidnapped. A September 2015 report of Amnesty International noted that 400 people were incarcerated, which based on a population of 4,6 million makes an imprisonment rate of 8.7 people per 100,000, compared to 60.0 people per 100,000 in Syria as a whole, and the second lowest rate in the world after San Marino. However, the report also noted some deficiencies in due process.

2015 report on prisons in Rojava by Voice of America

The Autonomous Administration of North and East Syria has pursued a policy of open access to international media as well as international human rights organisations. Human Rights Watch after a visit in early 2014 reported "arbitrary arrests, due process violations, and failed to address unsolved killings and disappearances" and made recommendations for government improvement. The report documented cases of "arbitrary arrests" and "unfair trials" that had occurred since the beginning of the revolution in 2012. The officials of the region claimed that the few proven instances of misconduct were isolated incidents and not tolerated. In its separate September 2015 report, Amnesty International criticised arbitrary long term detainment followed by unfair trials, in some cases lasting minutes with no lawyers for the defendants accused of involvement with the Islamic State of Iraq and the Levant (ISIL). However, Fred Abrahams, special advisor to HRW who visited the region and drafted the report, noted that the region's institutions have taken solid steps to addressing the problems and had been receptive to criticism. He notes that they were currently in the process of political transitioning from the Syrian government, training a new police force and creating a new legal system.

On 22 September 2016 the security forces of the region prevented Rudaw's journalist Rengin Shero, coming from Iraqi Kurdistan, from visiting her family in Jazira canton. Rengin accused the forces of tearing her clothes and using violence against her, even though they knew she was pregnant.

On 30 September 2018 Syriac writer Suleiman Yussef was arrested in Qamishli by Sutoro for his political views. Yussef was one of the few Syriac writers who has continued to report critically on the self-administration's closure of Assyrian schools. Isa Rashid, another prominent Assyrian community figure who served as an education director for these targeted schools, was severely beaten outside his home by the Sutoro Police. Yussef was released a few days later after a lot of pressure from the Assyrian community.

Kurdish opposition parties in Syria represented by KNC, who are opposed to PYD-rule, have long complained of authoritarianism, heavy political persecution and gross human rights violations. They accuse western countries of systematically overlooking PYD's human rights violations against Kurds and other groups in areas under their control. Mentioned examples are; ethnic cleansing, arbitrary arrest and abduction of political opponents, forced conscription into PYD, torture or threat of torture and execution, as well as forcing Kurdish opponents into exile. KNC also allege that dozens of their members are arbitrarily detained by PYD at any given time.

==== Conscription ====
Due to the then militarily critical situation caused by the expansion of the Islamic State of Iraq and the Levant (ISIL), the regions of the NES from July 2014 introduced militia conscription duty in its Self-Defense Forces (HXP). Enforcing conscription has been called a human rights violation from the perspective of those who consider the Rojava institutions illegitimate.

=== Social and educational aspects of human rights development ===
==== Women's rights ====
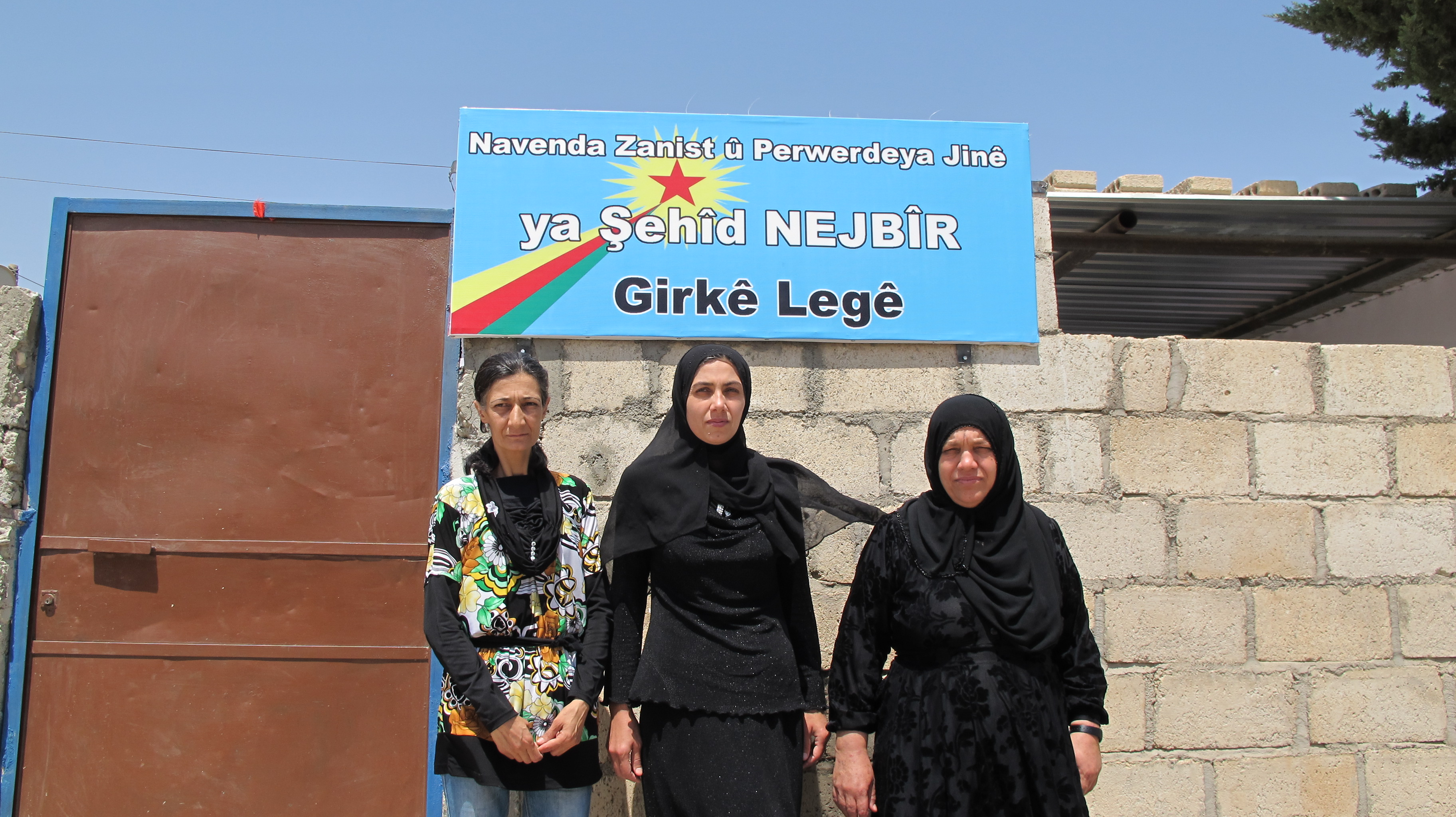
The women center in Al-Muabbada (Kurdish: Girkê Legê) offers services to survivors of domestic violence, sexual assault and other forms of harm.

The legal efforts to reduce cases of underage marriage, polygamy and honor killings are underpinned by comprehensive public awareness campaigns. In every town and village, a women's house is established. These are community centers run by women, providing services to survivors of domestic violence, sexual assault and other forms of harm. These services include counseling, family mediation, legal support, and coordinating safe houses for women and children. Classes on economic independence and social empowerment programs are also held at women's houses.

All administrative organs in the autonomous region are required to have male and female co-chairs, and forty percent of the members of any governing body in the region must be female. An estimated 25 percent of the Asayish police force of the NES regions are women, and joining the Asayish is described in international media as a huge act of personal and societal liberation from patriarchical background, for ethnic Kurdish and ethnic Arab women alike.

The claimed political agenda of "trying to break the honor-based religious and tribal rules that confine women" is very controversial in conservative quarters of Syrian society, who either outright disagree, or who believe imposing drastic changes is irresponsible when not taking local sensitivities into mind or giving the population adequate time to adapt and progress at their own pace like other regions of the world.

==== Ethnic minority rights ====
The autonomous region "opposes zero-sum notions of ethnic and national rights". It has comprehensive affirmative action to give power to minority groups and ethnicities as a guiding principle.

While under the administration of the Ba'ath Party school education consisted of only Arabic language public schools, supplemented by Assyrian private confessional schools, the region's administration in 2015 (leaving the private schools untouched) introduced for public schools primary education in native language either Kurdish or Arabic and secondary education mandatory bilingual in Kurdish and Arabic for public schools (with English as a third language). The Assyrian community in Jazira Canton in August 2016 founded the Ourhi Centre in the city of Qamishli, to educate teachers in order to make the Syriac-Aramaic an additional language to be taught in public schools, which then started with the 2016/17 academic year. With that academic year, states the Rojava Education Committee, "three curriculums have replaced the old one, to include teaching in three languages: Kurdish, Arabic and Syriac."

There has been, however, numerous instances of discrimination toward Assyrians, including policies of seizing the property of Assyrians who had to flee due to conflict, and numerous instances of attacks against the Assyrian minority.

In August 2018 there was controversy over an attempt by the region's authorities to implement its own Syriac curriculum in private Christian schools that have been continuing to use an Arabic curriculum with limited Syriac classes approved by the Assad regime and originally developed by Syrian Education Ministry in cooperation with Christian clergy in the 1950s. Multiple sources, including The Assyrian Policy Institute, reported that militiamen of the YPG and Sutoro, had entered private Assyrian schools and expelled their administrators and teachers. Demonstrators claimed this went against earlier agreements, and would implement a syllabus the status of which is not recognized in the rest of Syria. Authorities of the region's administration and allied Syriac organizations have however rejected the accusations, arguing the region's administration are trying to implement a Syriac language curriculum, that the schools had accepted Kurdish and Arab students against previous agreements, while accusing the protesters of being a fifth column of Assad's regime. The Syriac Union Party and Olaf Taw, the education organization which prepared the Syriac syllabus, stated that they rejected any closing of the schools and Olaf Taw sent its teachers to the Syriac schools in order to meet the management of the schools to discuss a way of applying the new Syriac syllabus. A deal was later reached in September 2018 between the region's authorities and the local Syriac Orthodox archbishopric, where the two first grades in these schools would learn the region's Syriac curriculum and grades three to six would continue to learn the Damascus approved curriculum.

One issue of contention is the consequence of the Baathist Syrian government's settling of Arab tribal settlers on land in Jazira Canton which was expropriated for the purpose from its previous Kurdish owners in the years 1973 and 2007, following a masterplan called "Arab Belt initiative". There are persistent calls to expel the settlers and return the land to their previous Kurdish owners among the Kurdish population of the region, which have led the political leadership of the region to press the Syrian government for a comprehensive solution.

Another issue of contention has been the "Law for the Management and Protection of the Assets of the Refugees and the Absentees" passed in September 2015 by the Jazira legislative council, which, in effect, authorises the confiscation of all assets of people who have left the region. Representatives of Christian Assyrians in the council refused to vote on the text, and the community as a whole perceived themselves targeted by the measure. While the law does not explicitly single out any ethnic group, the number of Christians who fled the region is much higher than other groups, so they would be more affected by asset seizures than other communities. In a bid to appease the Christian community, but also probably to avoid a backlash with foreign backers, the PYD eventually backtracked and agreed to hand over any assets seized from Christians to the church.

=== Development of freedom of speech and press ===
The 2014 constitution formally guarantees freedom of speech and freedom of the press, incorporating the Universal Declaration of Human Rights, the International Covenant on Civil and Political Rights, the International Covenant on Economic, Social and Cultural Rights, as well as other internationally recognized human rights conventions.

However, open criticism of the democratic confederalist political system, doctrine, policies, establishment and status quo is generally discouraged, especially for local media. Criticism of day-to-day mismanagement and corruption by low-level local officials, general lack of services or general grievances, on issues that hold little political weight, are mostly allowed and face little to no persecution. Some media networks are restricted and operate in secrecy, like Raqqa is Being Slaughtered Silently (RBSS), who also famously reported in secrecy from inside Raqqa during ISIL's repressive rule, as well as other independent media outlets that were restricted due to their critical stance against the PYD.

Expressing favourable political stances towards Turkey or other perceived enemies such as Hayat Tahrir al-Sham or the TFSA is prohibited. Other political positions that are discouraged are expressions of clear support for the Islamist Syrian opposition or for the Ba'athist regime. Challenges to the PYD's political ideology are also restricted. Political reporting is unrestricted only if it fits into established local narratives. For these reasons, local media mostly focus on cultural and social issues, while highlighting reconstruction initiatives and civil society activities.

Certain PYD officials have been known to arrest journalists or prevent them from filming certain events or even enter the region. The HCM council has been accused by some journalists and outlets of imposing censorship through selective licensing. The media landscape is reportedly mostly either independent and representing a Syrian identity, or partisan and representing a nationalist Kurdish identity. The partisan Kurdish media is known to be vulnerable to the rally 'round the flag effect, that is, showing strong pro-PYD tendencies in times of conflict or crisis, such as during the repeated military invasions by the Turkish government.

The editorial line in the media has transitioned towards a "generally less critical, if not supportive stance of the PYD-led political system". This is said by local journalists to be due to both personal convictions of some reporters, as well as to the feeling that direct criticism of libertarian socialism would be very unpopular in a conflict-ridden context and would make them "an easy target".

International and regional media report relatively freely by Syrian standards, but they also state that there are constant underlining tensions with the PYD authorities in power and red lines that generally cannot be crossed. Some local media outlets have been shut down under the pretext of them having connections to foreign intelligence agencies.

Local journalists say it is common for some authorities to call media offices directly and order certain issues to not be covered. Journalists have been arrested or banned from reporting on numerous occasions, such as a journalist from the Iraq-based Zagros TV who was arrested in 2017 and the withdrawal of licensing for the Rudaw Media Network in 2015.

There are also reports of PYD youth groups attacking or threatening journalists. Serdar Mele Darwish, founder of Aso, a local network of local journalists, says: "In the current situation,.. Confronting the authorities too directly is not an option. They would withdraw your license, and your journalists on the ground would be in danger. This would be detrimental to your coverage and impact".

Additionally, media often face economic pressures, as demonstrated by the shutting down of news website Welati in May 2016. Political extremism incited by the context of the Syrian Civil war can put media outlets under pressure, the April 2016 threatening and burning down of the premises of Arta FM ("the first, and only, independent radio station staffed and broadcast by Syrians inside Syria") in Amuda by unidentified assailants being the most prominent example.

=== Development of political participation rights ===
The political model of the region's governance is based on the idea of direct democracy in the self-governance of municipal communities, a philosophy and modus which finds its form in particular in municipal citizens' assemblies.

In the autonomous region, elements of a mutual multi-party democracy have developed, and a large number of political parties and party alliances exist, with broadly free and fair municipal elections having been held in March 2015. Issues of the system from a political participation rights perspective concern the high level of control which the leading Movement for a Democratic Society (TEV-DEM) alliance, itself dominated by the Democratic Union Party, exercise on politics and policy, in particular on the federal level.

=== Refugee issues ===
==== Hosting inbound refugees ====
During the Syrian Civil War, the population of the region has more than doubled to about 4.6 million, among the newcomers being Syrians of all ethnicities who have fled from violence taking place in other parts of Syria. Many ethnic Arab citizens from Iraq have found a safe haven in the region as well. In an October 2016 report from the region, U.S. academic Si Sheppard described about Iraqi refugees fleeing the Battle of Mosul that "the lucky ones have found an unlikely haven in neighboring Syria, a place hardly synonymous with physical well-being in the popular imagination. But there is one pocket of the country where the desperate and dispossessed are still welcome. This is Rojava, where the Kurds have established a relative oasis of security and opportunity in a desert of anarchy and oppression."

In the Afrin District with a population of 172,095 according to the 2004 Syrian census alone, according to a June 2016 estimate from the International Middle East Peace Research Center about 316,000 displaced Syrians of Kurdish, Arab and Turkmen ethnicity have found a safe haven.

=== Detention facilities for IS affiliates ===
On 24 April 2024, Amnesty International reported that there is a large-scale human rights violation of more than 56,000 people including 30,000 children and 14,500 women held indefinitely in at least 27 detention facilities for those with "perceived IS affiliation". According to the report among those held in this detention system are hundreds of Yazidis, Syrians, Iraqis, and foreign citizens from nearly 74 other countries. The report described the trials as "flawed", and many of the people in these camps were detained without charges. Detainees are held in inhumane conditions and subjected to torture including severe beatings, stress positions, and electric shocks with thousands having been forcibly disappeared. Women were also subjected to attacks by other prisoners for perceived "moral" infractions. Agnès Callamard accused the US government of playing a central role in the creation and maintenance of this system.

== See also ==
- Human rights in the Middle East
