= Siege of Qamishli and Hasakah =

Part of the Rojava conflict and the Syrian Civil War

- Part of the Rojava conflict and the Syrian Civil War
Date	10 January – 2 February 2021 (3 weeks and 2 days)
Location	Qamishli and Hasakah, Syria
Result	Siege lifted

Belligerents
Autonomous Administration of North and East Syria	(Syria) Syrian Arab Republic

Units involved
Asayish police YPG	Syrian police National Defense Force; Syrian Army

Casualties and losses
None	2 killed 7 wounded 3 captured
- 6 civilians wounded

The siege of Qamishli and Hasakah was a siege laid upon Ba'athist Syrian government-controlled areas of the towns of Qamishli and Hasakah by the Asayish forces of the AANES. The siege was allegedly enacted in response to the restrictions of exclusively Syrian Democratic Forces-controlled areas of the Shahba region and the restriction of movement and supplies to the YPG-controlled neighborhoods of Sheikh Maqsoud and Ashrafieh in Aleppo by the Syrian government.

The siege was mainly centered in the "Hasakah Security Box," and the neighborhoods of Halko and al-Tayy in Qamishli, preventing the entry of forces loyal to the Syrian government as well as supplies and fuel to the areas. The siege began on 10 January 2021 after the two sides failed to reach an agreement regarding a wide range of issues, including release of AANES prisoners.

== Siege ==
On 10 January, Asayish forces began blocking the arrival of food, supplies, water tanks, students and workers to the towns. 3 high ranking Syrian Army officers were arrested in Hasakah. Demands were made to the Damascus government for the release 450 Syrian Democratic Forces prisoners, the withdrawal of SAA forces from AANES-controlled areas, and the provision of social guarantees, medical services and education.

On 23 January, clashes erupted between the two sides, resulting in 6 pro-government fighters being injured. The National Defence Forces (NDF) claimed that one of their checkpoints had been attacked, while the Asayish claimed that the NDF had attacked one of their checkpoints. Clashes resumed that night leading to injuries, with activists claiming one NDF militiaman was killed in the clashes.

On 31 January, Asayish opened fire on a pro-government vigil in Hasakah that was condemning the siege, killing one policeman and injuring one other policeman and six civilians.

On 2 February, government forces and the Asayish reached an agreement. The siege of the government-held neighborhoods in Qamishli and Hasakah were lifted, and the two sides began to forge a deal to end the government restrictions in Aleppo city and the countryside.

== See also ==
- AANES–Syria relations
- Battle of al-Hasakah (2016)
- Battle of Qamishli (2016)
- Qamishli clashes (2021)
