= Qamishli clashes (2018) =

Skirmish in the city of Qamishli, Syria

- Part of the Rojava conflict and the Syrian Civil War
Date	8 September 2018
Location	Qamishli, Syria
Result	Indecisive

Belligerents
(Syria) Syrian Arab Republic	Democratic Federation of Northern Syria

Units involved
Syrian Army	Asayish

Casualties and losses
11 killed 2 wounded	7 killed 1 wounded

The 2018 Qamishli clashes were a skirmish that erupted between the Syrian Arab Army and the Asayish forces in the city of Qamishli, Syria on September 8, 2018.

== Background ==
Qamishli is partially controlled between the Syrian Government and the Democratic Autonomous Administration of North and East Syria. This situation has created tensions between the two sides, like the Battle of Qamishli (2016).

== The clashes ==
The clashes erupted on 8 September 2018. According to Kurdish sources, the fighting took place after a Syrian government patrol consisting of three vehicles entered areas controlled by the Asayish, arrested civilians, and targeted their forces with light and medium weapons. They then responded to the attack. The Syrian government claims that the soldiers were on their way to the Qamishli Airport, which is under its control, when they were attacked. According to a source within the Syrian military, the soldiers that the Asayish targeted had previously prevented United States troops from entering Qamishli. The attack was believed to have taken place in retaliation for this confrontation with American troops. The clashes left 11 government soldiers killed and 2 wounded and 7 Asayish members killed and one wounded.

== See also ==
- Battle of Qamishli (2016)
- Rojava–Syria relations
