= Battle of Qamishli (2021) =

Military operation of the Syrian civil war

- Part of the Rojava conflict and the Syrian civil war
- AANES control Syrian Government control Areas captured by Asayish during the battle
Date	20 April 2021 – 26 April 2021 (6 days)
Location	Qamishli, al-Hasakah Governorate, Syria
Result	Asayish victory
Territorial changes	Asayish forces take complete control of the al-Tayy and Halkou neighborhoods; End of NDF presence in Qamishli

Belligerents
Autonomous Administration of North and East Syria	(Syria) Syrian Arab Republic

Units involved
Asayish; Special Security Forces (HAT); Jaysh al-Thuwar	Syrian Armed Forces; National Defense Forces; Syrian Army

Casualties and losses
2 killed, 6 wounded	23 militiamen killed 16 militiamen wounded 12 soldiers killed 7 soldiers wounded
- 2–3 civilians killed, 9 wounded

The Battle of Qamishli (2021) took place between security forces of the Autonomous Administration of North and East Syria (AANES) and forces loyal to the Syrian Arab Republic in the northeastern Syrian city of Qamishli. The clashes began on 20 April 2021, after the Asayish targeted a vehicle carrying pro-Syrian government NDF militia fighters. The clashes were conducted with medium and light weapons such as AK-47s as well as RPGs.

The Asayish captured Tayy and Halako neighborhoods during the battle, and captured most NDF checkpoints. Following this, a deal between the AANES and the SAA was agreed upon, allowing for the NDF to completely leave Qamishli and for regular Syrian Army soldiers to fulfill the role of the NDF. The battle led to the Asayish controlling almost all of Qamishli city.

== Battle ==
On the night of 20 April, according to ISWNews, a vehicle carrying NDF fighters was assaulted at an Asayish checkpoint in Qamishli. In contrast, the Rojava Information Center reported that the NDF opened fire on the checkpoint, at al-Wahda roundabout in southern Qamishli, after being stopped. During the confrontation, the NDF fighters shot and killed an Asayish commander.

As clashes escalated, reinforcements and heavy vehicles from Asayish forces took control of two checkpoints in the government-controlled al-Tayy neighborhood. Russian soldiers unsuccessfully attempted to mediate between the two sides. That morning clashes continued and Asayish forces continued to advance while civilians evacuated the neighborhood. Asayish forces reportedly captured an NDF headquarters and several more positions before fighting ended that night.

A Russian-mediated ceasefire finally came into effect that night, with both sides agreeing to halt fighting, while the Asayish remained in control of the positions captured during the fighting. One Asayish and five NDF fighters were reportedly killed.

On 22 April, a pro-Asayish source claimed that NDF snipers fired at a group of young people near the al-Wahda roundabout, killing a child and injuring two other people. Further NDF breaches of the ceasefire led to a resumption of the battle between the two sides. Asayish forces made further gains in al-Tayy. However, the NDF counterattacked and took parts of Halkou and Al-Zohoor neighborhoods, including an Asayish headquarters.

That evening, Russian forces gathered notables from Qamishli in an attempt to end the fighting. However, a tribal figure close to the SDF was assassinated during the night reportedly by the NDF, leading to another breakdown of the ceasefire.

In the early hours of 23 April, Asayish forces advanced in the Halkou neighborhood towards the National Hospital, recapturing two areas near the cemetery. Concurrently, fighting continued in al-Tayy where the Asayish seized a security building and advanced some 100 meters, but most of the neighborhood remained under NDF control. However, later in the day, the Asayish fully captured the al-Tayy and Halkou neighborhoods.

Under Russian mediation, the Asayish and NDF reached an armistice deal in effect until 12:00 the next day. However, fighting briefly broke out after NDF units violated the ceasefire, targeting Asayish positions at the Halkou front line with RPGs. Jaysh al-Thurwar, a Free Syrian Army coalition that is closely allied to the YPG, arrived in the city to reinforce Asayish. Meanwhile, the government security unit that was stationed in the al-Tayy neighborhood returned to its station, while a Russian military delegation toured Halkou and al-Tayy along with the Asayish and SDF.

== See also ==
- Battle of Qamishli (2016)
- Battle of al-Hasakah (2016)
- Wusta clashes (2016)
- Qamishli clashes (2018)
- Siege of Qamishli and Al-Hasakah
- Rojava–Syria relations
