= Battle of Qamishli (2016) =

2016 violent conflict in the city of Qamishli, Syria

- Part of the Rojava conflict and the Syrian Civil War
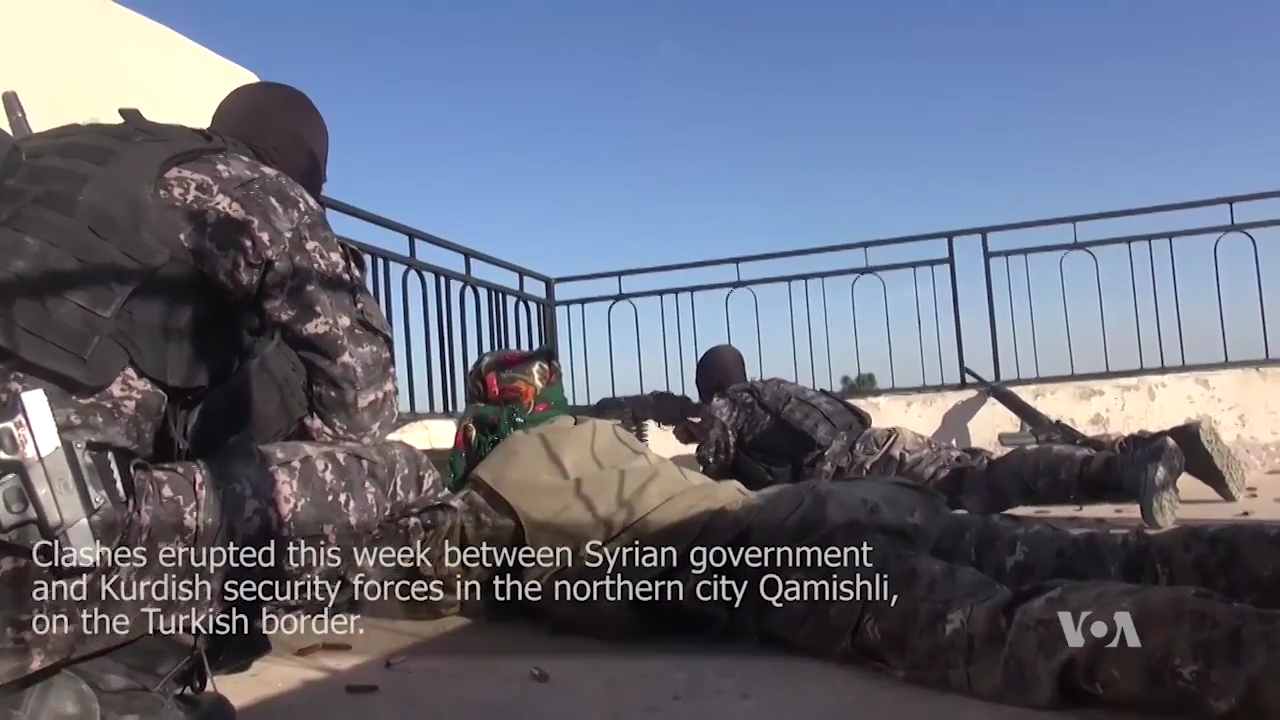
- Top: Asayish forces during the clashes Bottom: Strategic view of Qamishli, before the clashes occurred
Date	20–22 April 2016 (2 days)
Location	Qamishli, al-Hasakah Governorate, Syria 37°03′00″N 41°13′00″E
Result	Ceasefire: Kurdish forces capture the besieged Allaya Prison

Belligerents
(Democratic Autonomous Administration of North and East Syria) Democratic Federation of Northern Syria; Asayish; Special Security Forces (HAT); YPG; Self-Defense Forces (HPC)	(Syria) Syrian Arab Republic; National Defense Forces; Sootoro; Syrian Armed Forces (limited support)

Commanders and leaders
(Democratic Autonomous Administration of North and East Syria) Heval Redur (Asayish commander)	Unknown

Casualties and losses
16 killed	22–31 killed, 80–102 captured
- 17–23 civilians killed
- Location within Syria

The 2016 Battle of Qamishli was a violent urban battle between the Asayish police of the Autonomous Administration of North and East Syria and the pro-Syrian government National Defence Forces in the city of Qamishli, Syria.

== The battle ==
On 20 April 2016, National Defence Forces militias attacked an Asayish patrol when Kurdish police failed to stop at a government checkpoint inside the Qamishli District. According to Kurdish sources the NDF killed 2 Asayish members and 2 civilians with sniper fire. Additional clashes then escalated between the two factions, with Asayish forces taking part in the fighting, killing 8 NDF members and arresting others.

The next day, the Asayish encircled government forces in the center of the city, taking over a bakery and the besieged Allaya Prison, with five Asayish fighters being killed. 45 NDF militiamen surrendered and several civilians were killed. During the battle Asayish forces removed a poster of Bashar al-Assad in captured areas. In response, the Syrian Army shelled the prison and surrounding areas with mortars, killing 4 civilians in the nearby neighborhoods. On the same day, the Islamic State of Iraq and the Levant claimed a car bomb attack that killed and wounded 15 Kurdish fighters in the city. In the evening, the NDF and Sootoro reversed some of Asayish's gains and captured two checkpoints, a stadium, and a hospital in the city.

An indefinite ceasefire was declared on 22 April. According to the ceasefire agreement, each side will keep the territory under its control. The ceasefire gave the Kurds control of more territory in Northern Syria.

== Aftermath ==
Nearly two dozen of the captured pro-government fighters were subsequently released under the terms of the ceasefire on 25 April.

== See also ==
- Battle of al-Hasakah (2016)
- Wusta clashes (2016)
- Qamishli clashes (2018)
- Siege of Qamishli and Al-Hasakah
- Qamishli clashes (2021)
- Rojava–Syria relations
