= DAANES–Syria relations =

DAANES-Syria relations
- Democratic Autonomous Administration of North and East Syria: Syria

The relations between the Democratic Autonomous Administration of North and East Syria (DAANES), the Ba'athist Syrian government from 2012 to 2024, and the Syrian transitional government from 2024 to 2026 concern the military and political relationship between the de facto autonomous, multi-ethnic region in northern and eastern Syria and the Syrian governments. These relations lasted from 2012 until the integration of the DAANES into the Syrian state in 2026.

Relations first developed in the context of the Syrian civil war and the Rojava conflict, as Kurdish Syrians and other ethnic minorities established the DAANES, also known in English as the Self-Administration of Northeast Syria, as a semi-autonomous region within Syria, which was then controlled by the Ba'athist regime under President Bashar al-Assad. The Syrian Ba'athist government did not officially recognize the autonomy of the DAANES and advocated a centralist approach to the governance of Syria. The DAANES sought the federalization of Syria rather than full independence. The Assad regime had no authority or institutions within the DAANES outside its two security boxes in Qamishli and Al-Hasakah. The DAANES did not allow the Syrian Ba'athist government to hold elections in areas under its control, instead holding its own elections.

For much of the period between 2015 and 2024, an informal non-aggression pact existed between the Syrian Armed Forces and the Syrian Democratic Forces (SDF), although occasional confrontations continued. The two forces cooperated against Islamist groups, including the Islamic State, as well as against the Turkish Armed Forces and the Turkish-backed Syrian National Army following Turkey's intervention in the country. The two sides also cooperated militarily under Russian supervision between 2019 and 2024, with Syrian and Russian troops stationed along the Turkish occupation zone to prevent further Turkish advances. The DAANES and SDF participated in the 2024 Syrian opposition offensives, at times fighting against both opposition forces and the Syrian government.

Following the fall of the Assad regime, the DAANES established relations with the transitional government headed by President Ahmed al-Sharaa. In March 2025, the DAANES agreed to recognize the new transitional government and begin integrating its military and political institutions into the Syrian state by the end of 2025. When the deadline passed without meaningful progress, the Syrian transitional government, assisted by local Arab rebel groups, seized large swathes of DAANES territory. Following the seizure of DAANES territory by government forces, up to 80% of its territory was captured and subsequently ceded to the Syrian transitional government as part of an integration agreement. This culminated in the DAANES's full integration into the Syrian state on 20 August 2026.

== Timeline ==
Rojava–Ba'athist Syrian conflict
- Part of Syrian Civil War and Rojava conflict
Date	September 2012 – December 2024
Location	primarily northeastern Syria
Result	Stalemate; Full results: Fall of the Assad regime.; YPG/SDF asserted control over most of northeastern Syria from 2012 to 2019. The SAA re-entered the region during Operation Peace Spring as part of a military agreement with SDF, stationed along NES’ borders with Turkey, without gaining any territorial control or administrative presence in SDF areas.; American intervention and support for the Autonomous Administration of North and East Syria (under the umbrella of the Syrian Democratic Forces).; Occasional cooperation against the Islamic State or Hay'at Tahrir al-Sham & Turkey-backed SNA.; Syrian government's armaments and support to the Arab tribes against the Syrian Democratic Forces.; Mutual assassinations of high level commanders and individuals between the sides.; No political or civil agreement reached between the two sides, consistent failure of negotiations.; No return of Syrian government institutions to DAANES.

Belligerents
Rojava; Supported by: United States	(Syria) Syrian Arab Republic (surrendered); Supported by: Iran; Hezbollah; Russia

Commanders and leaders
(Democratic Autonomous Administration of North and East Syria) Riad Darar (Democratic Autonomous Administration of North and East Syria) Îlham Ehmed (Democratic Autonomous Administration of North and East Syria) Salih Muhammad	(Ba'athist Syria) Bashar al-Assad (surrendered)

Units involved
Syrian Democratic Forces; People's Defense Units; Deir ez-Zor Military Council; Asayish	Syrian Arab Armed Forces; National Defence Forces; Sootoro (GPF) (Ba'athist Syria) Popular Resistance of the Eastern Region Wagner Group

Casualties and losses
at least 60 killed	600+ killed 1,200+ captured unknown wounded
- 129+ civilians reported killed by SAA shelling and bombing

=== 2012 ===
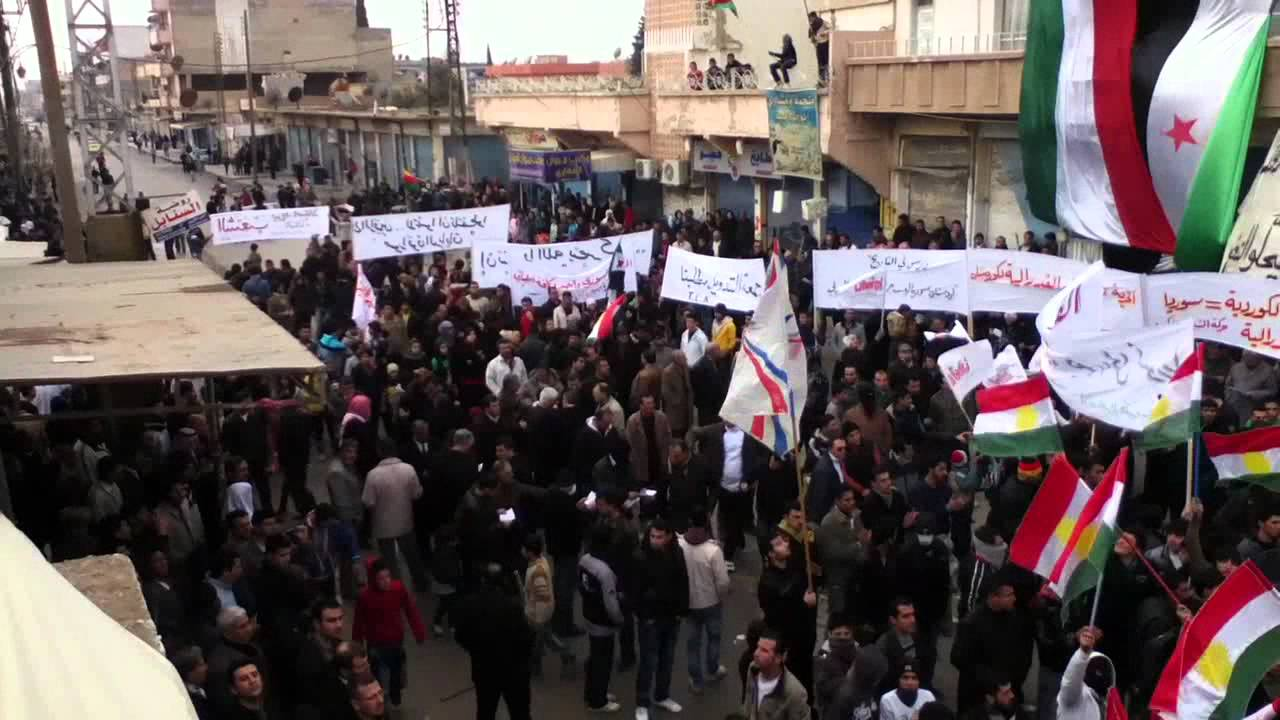
Kurds, Assyrians, and Arabs demonstrate against the Syrian government in Qamishli, 6 January 2012

On September 6, 2012 Kurdish activists reported that 21 civilians were killed in the Kurdish neighborhood of Sheikh Maqsud in Aleppo, when the Syrian Army shelled the local mosque and its surroundings. Despite the district being neutral during the Battle of Aleppo and free of government and FSA clashes, local residents believed that the district was shelled as retaliation for sheltering anti-government civilians from other parts of the city. In a statement released shortly after the deaths, the Kurdish People's Defense Units (YPG) vowed to retaliate. A few days later, Kurdish forces killed three soldiers in Afrin (Kurdish: Efrîn) and captured a number of other government soldiers in Kobani and Al-Malikiyah (Kurdish: Dêrika Hemko), from where they drove the remaining government security forces out. It was also reported that the government had begun to arm Arab tribes around Qamishli in preparation for a possible confrontation with Kurdish forces, who still did not completely control the city.

At least eight government soldiers were killed and 15 wounded by a car bomb in the al-Gharibi district of Qamishli on 30 September 2012. The explosion targeted the Army's Political Security branch.

=== 2013 ===
The YPG claimed to have killed 376 Syrian government soldiers and captured 790 in 2013.

On 2 January 2013, a bomb was detonated by unknown assailants in front of a Syrian government security office in Qamishli, wounding four members of the local security forces.

==== Clashes extend ====
In mid-January, as clashes re-erupted between rebels and Kurdish separatists in Ras al-Ayn, YPG forces moved to expel government forces from oil-rich areas in Hasakah Province. Clashes broke out from 14 to 19 January between the army and YPG fighters in the Kurdish village of Gir Zîro (Tall Adas), near al-Maabadah (Kurdish: Girkê Legê), where an army battalion of around 200 soldiers had been blockaded since 9 January. YPG forces claimed to have expelled government after the clashes. One soldier was reportedly killed and another eight injured, while seven were captured (later released) and 27 defected. Fighting at the oil field near Gir Zîro ended on 21 January, when government forces withdrew after receiving no assistance from Damascus. In Rumeilan, directly west of al-Maabadah, another 200 soldiers had been surrounded by YPG forces, and 10 soldiers were reported to have defected.

From 8 to 11 February, heavy clashes broke out between the YPG and government troops in the PYD/YPG-held district Ashrafiyah where, according to SOHR, at least 3 soldiers and 5 pro-government militiamen were killed. The fighting followed deadly shelling on 31 January on Ashrafiyah, in which 23 civilians were killed after FSA units moved into the Kurdish sector of Aleppo. According to its own reports, the YPG lost 7 of its members the fighting, while also claiming that 48 soldiers were killed and 22 captured, and a further 70 injured.

On 26 February, the Syrian army once again shelled the PYD-held Kurdish sector of Aleppo, causing extensive damage to civilian areas. Five people were killed in the bombardment, and eleven more—including four children—were injured.

In the beginning of March, YPG forces took complete control of oil fields and installations in north-east Syria after government forces in it surrendered. During the same time YPG assaulted government forces and took control of town Tall ʿAdas, which is adjacent to Rumeilan oil fields, and also took control of Al-Qahtaniya (Kurdish: Tirbespî).

On 14 April 2013, government warplanes bombed the predominantly Kurdish village of Hadad, in Hasakah Governorate. 16 people were reported killed.

On December 31, 2013, as YPG units were locked in large-scale and bloody fighting around the jihadist stronghold of Tall Hamis, Kurdish sources reported that government forces simultaneously attacked a YPG checkpoint in the Hasakah neighbourhood of Kallasah and an Asayish checkpoint in nearby Tall Hajar neighbourhood. The sources claimed that seven soldiers were killed by the YPG and Asayish as they counterattacked and secured both areas, while one YPG fighter lost his life and two Asayish members were wounded; civilian deaths and injuries were also reported. Government forces soon retreated, and a tense calm had returned to the city by the following day.

=== 2014 ===
On March 31, 2014, Kurdish sources claimed that members of the pro-government National Defence Force shot a YPG fighter in Qamishli city. The YPG responded by launching an operation in the Qadour Bek district of Qamishli, killing seven pro-government fighters and detaining 10 others. It was also reported that the YPG captured parts of the Qadour Bek district, including the Customs Building and the Qamishli's Bread Factory.

On March 27, SOHR reported that the Syrian army shelled the Kurdish-held neighbourhood of al-Msheirfah in Hasakah city. The Syrian Kurdish news agency ANHA, citing a YPG source, stated that the attack began at 11:30 AM, and that mortar shells fired by the army struck the YPG's "Martyr Shiyar" office and a cotton mill, causing material damage. This incident occurred while the YPG was fighting off an ISIS attack against the town of Jaz'ah near Ya'rubiyah.

On April 5, 2014, according to the SOHR, the leader of the NDF center in Hasakah was killed by the Islamic State of Iraq and the Levant in Al-Shadadi, south of Hasakah.

On June 28, 2014, Syrian government forces, backed by the NDF, took control of five villages after clashes with ISIS and allied tribes near Qamishli. Government forces bombarded ISIS strongholds in the area.

In October 2014, the Syrian state media claimed the government had sent arms to Kurdish forces during the Siege of Kobanî, but this claim was disputed by the PYD.

=== 2015 ===
Throughout most of 2015, the YPG was grudgingly accepting of SAA/NDF presence in Al-Hasakah city, letting them take the brunt of casualties in several battles with ISIL. De facto cooperation ensued between local YPG and SAA/NDF units against ISIL, though tensions were high there were several clashes throughout the year.

In January 2015, the YPG clashed with Syrian government forces in Al-Hasakah city.

In April 2015, Syrian minister Ali Haidar reportedly met with Kurdish officials in the Autonomous Administration of North and East Syria, and conducted talks regarding some degree of de jure autonomy for the region, in spite of the region already being de facto autonomous from the government. He also claimed the government was providing military assistance to Kurdish forces.

In June 2015, the YPG and Asayish forces again clashed with the government in Qamishli, capturing several institutions.

In July 2015, YPG and government forces cooperated against ISIS during the Battle of Al-Hasakah.

In July 2015, PYD leader Salih Muslim announced that the YPG was willing to join the Syrian army if the government committed to official decentralization of powers.

On August 4, 2015, the YPG laid out terms for collaboration with the Syrian government.

On August 9, 2015, in response to allegations of collaboration with the government, a YPG spokesman issued a statement that the YPG will "collaborate with anyone to expel extremists" from northeastern Syria.

On September 16, 2015, Syrian President Bashar al-Assad announced that Syria was open to decentralization proposals after the conflict between the government and opposition groups was over.

On October 9, 2015, PYD officials reportedly held talks with representatives of the Syrian government and the Russian military in Damascus and Latakia about a joint effort against ISIS.

On December 7, 2015, Assad affirmed that his government had supplied arms to the PYD, and said he had documents to verify his claim.

On December 16, 2015, the Asayish had a minor clash with Syrian National Defence Forces in Qamishli after the arrest of Asayish members by the NDF.

On December 19, 2015, the YPG and allied groups signed a truce with the Fatah Halab rebel operations room in Aleppo. This was quickly followed by a peace with the Mare' Operations Room. This marked a deterioration in relations between the YPG and the Syrian government.

On December 23, 2015, Syrian National Defence Forces launched an attack on YPG-led Syrian Democratic Forces in Al-Hasakah, resulting in 4 injured SDF fighters and 1 dead NDF militant. The same day, Syrian military helicopters dropped barrel bombs on the YPG-controlled neighborhood of Sheikh Maqsoud in Aleppo. Russia also announced that it would provide assistance to the YPG only through the Syrian government.

=== 2016 ===
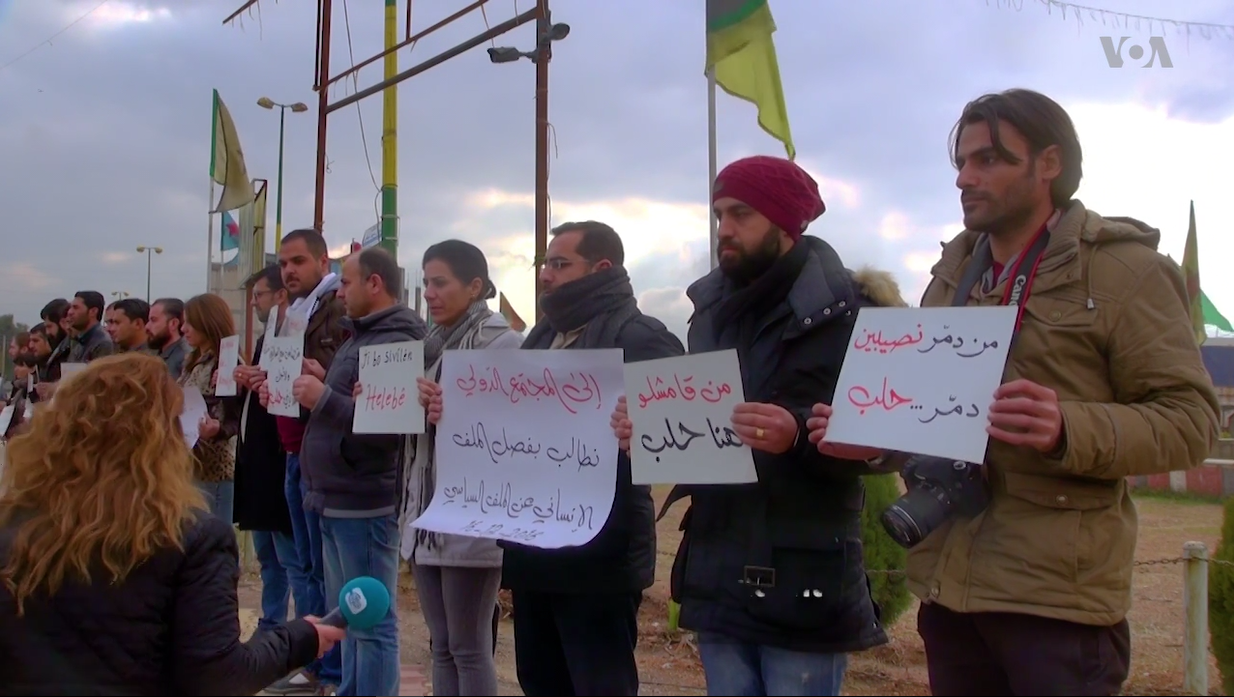
A demonstration in Qamishli in solidarity with residents of Aleppo on the day the Battle of Aleppo ended; 22 December 2016

On January 13, 2016, the Asayish attacked the government-backed Sootoro militia's checkpoints in Qamishli, resulting in the death of one Sootoro militant, although the militias reconciled on January 18.

On January 31, 2016, the Syrian Permanent Representative to the UN Bashar Jaafari ruled out autonomy or federalism for Kurdish areas in Syria.

On February 15, 2016, the Syrian government condemned Turkey's shelling of Kurdish forces in the border region in a letter to the UN Security Council.

On March 16, 2016, PYD-linked Asayish forces reportedly surrounded an NDF controlled position in Qamishli. Details are currently unclear.

In late April 2016, Asayish forces clashed with the National Defence Forces loyal to Syrian Government in Qamishli, resulting in the battle of Qamishli. The YPG also got involved. During three days of clashes, 16 YPG/Asayish fighters and 23 civilians were killed; NDF casualties were 22-31 killed and 80-102 captured. The YPG seized three positions from the government in Qamishli, including the prison. NDF and Sootoro reversed some of Asayish's gains and captured two checkpoints, a stadium, and a hospital in the city. On April 22, both sides agreed on a tentative truce, and territory taken by the Kurdish forces was taken back by government.

On 11 August 2016 the Asayish released 40 government prisoners in exchange for the release of 70 pro-PYD prisoners from government prisons.

On 16 August 2016, clashes broke out in Hasakah city between Asayish and NDF forces. It escalated with the intervention of the SAA and YPG, and featured Syrian government planes bombing Kurdish territory for the first time in the war. The fighting lasted one week and ended in a beneficial ceasefire deal on August 23. The government ceded more territory in Hasakah to the YPG, granting them full control of all but 5% of the city. 77 SAA/NDF troops were killed (per YPG sources) and 170 were captured (many were released or traded later). 14 Asayish and 40 civilians also died.

As of 23 August 2016, Russia attempted to broker a deal between the government and Kurdish forces, but was unsuccessful. Improved Syria–Turkey relations have resulted in greater conflict between the YPG and the Assad government, with the Kurds demanding government forces leave Al-Hasakah.

In October 2016, a Russian initiative for federalization with a focus on northern Syria was reported, which at its core called to turn the existing institutions of the Democratic Autonomous Administration of North and East Syria into legitimate institutions of Syria; also reported was its rejection for the time being by the Syrian government.

On 23 November, clashes broke out between the Asayish and government forces in Qamishli, resulting in the deaths of at 2 Syrian soldiers, including an officer.

=== 2017 ===
In an interview in March 2017, Zaynab Jamil Kanbar, the co-leader of the Manbij administration council, which was created on 12 March, stated that there is no Syrian government presence in Manbij city and the council has "rejected any cooperation with the regime". However, the Syrian Army and Russian forces reached an agreement with the Manbij Military Council in February to hand over several villages west of Manbij during the East Aleppo offensive (January–March 2017).

On 8 June, an American plane shot down a Syrian armed drone and destroyed two armed and manned pick-up trucks belonging to pro-government troops that moved near SDF fighters at Al-Tanf.

On 18 June, the SDF clashed with Syrian Army troops south of Tabqa where an Su-22 fighter bomber was shot down by a US Air Force F/A-18E/F.

On 27 July, clashes between the SDF and the Syrian Army were reported south of Tabqa.

=== 2018 ===
On 7 February 2018, Syrian Army soldiers backed by Wagner's group mercenaries and pro-regime militias carried out an attempt to attack coalition and Kurdish positions and capture oil fields, with artillery and armor. The attack failed as the embedded American forces in the SDF units opened fire with artillery and called in airstrikes from both helicopters and fixed-wing aircraft. There were 220 casualties among the Syrian government forces, of which 69 were killed (15 Russians).

On 10 February, Syrian Army forces launched another attack on Kurdish forces, this time near the Al Tabiyeh gas field. The Syrian Army unit withdrew after a US drone strike destroyed one of their tanks, killing the crew.

During the Turkish military operation in Afrin, 1,000+ Syrian NDF fighters arrived to capture villages left behind in the wake of the YPG's withdrawal and bolster the YPG against the Turkish military and Turkish-backed Syrian National Army. They were subsequently bombed and shelled by Turkish forces, killing 91+ pro-government troops.

On 2 April, members of the pro-government Popular Resistance In Eastern Region declared that they will fight SDF and US force in Syria. On 12 April, they targeted US military bases north of Raqqa.

On 29 April, clashes occurred when Syrian government troops attacked SDF troops in the Deir ez-Zor Governorate, resulting in the deaths of 10 SAA and 5 SDF fighters. American forces were present for air support, but did not directly attack the Syrian government forces, settling for firing warning shots and ceasing further action after the clashes ended later that day.

On 31 May, President Bashar al-Assad stated in an interview with Russia Today that “The only problem left in Syria is the SDF.”

==== NES-Syria meeting ====
On 3 July, NES/SDF authorities removed several YPG flags and portraits of Abdullah Öcalan from cities and towns under their control in Northern Syria. Pro-government media reported this to be as a result of a preliminary agreement being struck between the NES/SDF and Syrian Government, in which the latter allegedly promised to include the Kurdish language as a part of the Syrian national curriculum, consider military service in the YPG as analogous to service in the Syrian Army (for the purposes of veteran status and military pensions), as well as the creation of a permanent post for a Kurdish official in Syria's oil ministry. Several Kurdish officials denied before Kurdistan 24 that such negotiations had taken place, stating that the removal of flags and portraits was part of "an administrative decision to organize and regulate roadside advertising" and had nothing to do with politics.

On 28 July, the Kurdish-led council in northern Syria reported that it had decided to create a roadmap for a "democratic and decentralized Syria" with the Syrian Government, after reportedly meeting with Syrian government officials in Damascus at the invitation of Syrian President Bashar al-Assad.

On 29 July, former PYD co-chair Salih Muslim reported that the atmosphere during the meeting with the Syrian government had been "positive and promising", adding that the government had accepted to discuss the notion of a decentralized Syria. He stated that the SDF was willing to join government offensives in Northwestern Syria and considered militant groups in Idlib to be no different than those in Afrin. He finished by stating that the NES did not wait for permission from international powers to start negotiations with the government, instead simply informed them that they had already started. Later that day, the NES returned over 44 bodies of Syrian Army servicemen killed by ISIL in 2014 to the Syrian Government.

On 30 July, a Syrian Kurdish MP and leader of the Damascus-based 'Syrian Kurds National Initiative', Omar Ose, urged the NES/SDF to enter into full negotiations (as opposed to 'talks') with the Syrian Government. He added that the two sides had managed to agree on 6 of the 10 key issues brought up during the previous two rounds of dialogue.

By the end of July, the two sides had agreed to set up negotiations in "stages". The first stage would cover mutually beneficial and mostly technical matters, such as the restoration of government-sponsored energy, education and health projects, as well as the re-integration of government civil registrations with those within the NES. The second would involve the restoration of government control over the border crossings with Iraq, Turkey and Iraqi Kurdistan, as well as the stationing of government security forces along the state borders currently under the control of the NES. The last stage would involve solving the "major issues" (such as a potential future re-integration of the NES as a whole, within the context of a 'decentralized' system) between the two sides, using the mutual confidence that would be built from the successful completion of the previous stages. The Syrian Democratic Council reportedly voted in favour of negotiations with the Syrian government to this effect. The U.S. envoy Brett McGurk was informed of the ongoing talks and reportedly did not object to the prospect of negotiations between the two sides, but suggested starting out negotiations with a focus on "restoring services".

On 8 September 2018, clashes in Quamishli took place between the Autonomous Administration of North and East Syria and Syrian Arab Republic forces yet again. 10+ SAA troops and 7 Asayish fighters were killed. Many more on both sides were injured.

==== US announces withdrawal and beginning of new negotiations ====
During late December, following US President Donald Trump's remarks about a complete withdrawal of all U.S. forces stationed in Syria, which placed the NES under imminent threat from a Turkish invasion, the NES entered into official dialogue with the Syrian Government. The head of the YPG officially asked the government to deploy Syrian Army troops within NES-administered areas in order to protect the region, following a threat by Turkish Defence Minister Hulusi Akar to "bury" Kurdish forces in their trenches, who added the Turkey was "intensely" preparing for a military operation against the SDF. A Syrian Army spokesperson stated that "all Syrians must join efforts to preserve national sovereignty and defeat all invaders". Following this announcement, SAA troops were stationed outside the SDF-held town of Manbij, positioning themselves between the SDF-held areas and those under Turkish/TFSA control. The SDF also withdrew entirely from Arima, allowing the SAA to take full control of the town.

=== 2019 ===
On 4 January, a senior SDF official stated that a deal between the SDF and the Syrian government was "inevitable".

On 24 January, the initial response of the government was described as "positive" by the head of the YPG, with a government minister also "expressing optimism".

On 10 February, the SDF was reported to have been selling large amounts of crude oil to the Syrian government, despite a US embargo.

==== Negotiations stall ====
On 22 February, US president Trump decided to keep a contingent of at least 400 US troops stationed within Syria. The negotiations between the SDF and Syrian government were reported to have stalled and "gone nowhere", with the Trump administration discouraging further talks between the two sides.

On 6 March, former Democratic Union Party (PYD) co-chair, Salih Muslim, stated in an interview that the dialogue process was not organized by the United States and that their "political will was never controlled by Washington". He added that they had provided the Russian government with a roadmap for a political settlement, which received "good feedback", while also stating that they were "neither with the regime, nor with the opposition".

On 13 March, the Prime Minister of Iraqi Kurdistan, Nechirvan Barzani, urged the SDF/NES to take part in negotiations with the Syrian Government and Russia to become a mediator between the two sides.

On 4 May, SDF and SAA forces fought side by side against a short-lived Turkish-TFSA offensive on Tell Rifaat, in which SDF-SAA forces were able to successfully defend the town and its surrounding villages.

On 8 May, the SDF was reported to have increased the amount of oil it sold to the Syrian government, as well as maintained deep economic ties to government-held areas.

On 23 May, former PYD co-chair, Salih Muslim, stated that he thought Russia had let Syrian Kurds down by "failing to support their autonomy" and by negotiating "behind the scenes" with Turkey. He stated that he had proposed a deal for a "decentralized political system in Syria" to Russia, but received no reply from the Syrian government.

On 31 May, the US-led coalition carried out several air strikes against oil tankers transporting oil from NES/SDF-held areas to those held by the Syrian government via the Euphrates river. The airstrikes hit at least three tankers, reportedly causing at least four casualties. The trade of oil to government-controlled areas is considered "smuggling" by the US-led coalition.

On 3 July, Russian foreign minister Sergey Lavrov called for direct talks between the NES and Syrian government. He spoke at a press conference, explaining that Moscow had “understood the need to take into account the interests of all ethnic and religious groups of the Syrian society, including the Kurds, in all stages of negotiations”. He added that Russia had "noticed the Kurds are interested in dialogue", which he stated Russia welcomes.

On 16 August, the Syrian Democratic Forces called for official negotiations between the SDF/NES and the Syrian Government. The head of the SDF stated that he is hoping that negotiations with Damascus would lead to a "political solution, recognizing the self-administration and the rights of the Kurdish people in Syria", as well as unite the SDF and Syrian Armed Forces into a singular, unified military force.

On 4 September, senior PYD official Salih Muslim stated that his party (which was at that time the main political force in the NES), was ready to "go to Damascus" and negotiate as many times as was necessary to achieve a political settlement with the Syrian Government.

On 6 September, the Syrian Democratic Forces (which serve as the armed forces of the NES) reached an agreement with the Syrian Army on opening a new crossing, which would be located near the town of Al-Salihiyah and reportedly promote commerce and trade between the locals living in areas controlled by the Syrian Government and NES, respectively.

On 15 September, relations between the two sides took a turn for the worse, as Syria's foreign ministry described SDF forces as "separatist terrorist militias" in a letter to the United Nations Secretary-General. The letter further accused the group of operating in "schemes", which it alleged were masterminded by the United States and Israel, as well as engaging in "crimes of the international coalition against the Syrian people". The SDF press office firmly condemned the statement, which it deemed an attempt by the Syrian government to "mislead the world public opinion and the United Nations organization by making false accusations" against the group. It also described what it deemed to be "miserable attempts" to "create sedition" within the territories controlled by the SDF. The statement concluded by urging Syria's Foreign Ministry to cease its "hostilities" and renew dialogue with the NES and SDF.

==== Second US withdrawal and Turkish offensive ====
On 7 October, US forces began to withdraw from the Northern Syria Buffer Zone, as US President Donald Trump reportedly gave a "green light" to Turkish President Recep Tayyip Erdoğan to invade and occupy territories held by the NES/SDF at that time. As a result of this action, which SDF forces deemed a "stab in the back", they announced their intention to renew negotiations with Syrian President Bashar al-Assad in order secure a deal that could see the entry of Syrian Army units into SDF-held territories, which they hope would forestall the planned Turkish invasion. Syria's Foreign Minister urged Kurdish forces to hand over several areas controlled by them to the Syrian Government, stating that should they refuse to do so, they would be faced with "abyss" in the face of Turkey.

On 8 October, the SDF accused the Syrian Army of preparing to capture the SDF-held city of Manbij. The Syrian Government denied the accusation and urged the group to peacefully hand over several areas in order to preempt a Turkish attack.

On 10 October, following the Turkey's invasion of northern Syria, the country's deputy foreign minister stated that he rejects the idea of talks between the Syrian Government and SDF, which he stated had "betrayed" Syria. He further added that the Syrian Government would not negotiate with those he deemed had become "hostages to foreign forces" or "agents of Washington". Despite this, the Syrian Government strongly condemned start of the Turkish offensive.

==== SDF-Syrian government deal reached ====
The two sides appeared to have reapproached each other following a Russian-backed deal three days later on 13 October, as the Syrian Democratic Forces agreed to allow the Syrian Army to enter the SDF-held towns of Manbij and Kobanî in an attempt to preempt a potential Turkish attack on the towns. Shortly thereafter, Syrian State broadcaster SANA announced that Syrian Army troops had started to deploy to the country's north in what it stated was a move to 'confront the Turkish aggression'. That same day, a senior Kurdish official confirmed that further talks between the SDF on one hand and the Syrian Government and its Russian ally on the other, continued to be held at that point at Russia's Khmeimim Air Base. The official expressed optimism that open talks between the two sides could be held shortly thereafter in Damascus. Both the Syrian Government and the SDF refused to comment on his remarks.

In the following days, Syrian forces passed through and Russian forces entered into Ras al-Ayn, Manbij, Kobanî, Raqqa, Tabqa, Al-Hasakah and numerous smaller towns and villages in coordination with the SDF. Syrian and Russian units were placed along the seam line between SDF and pro-Turkish forces, stopping the latter from advancing. Pro-government locals reportedly cheered the entry of Syrian Army troops.

On 22 October, the Second Northern Syria Buffer Zone was established, confirming the role of the Syrian Government in defence of Syria's northern border. The SDF stated that it was ready to consider merging with the Syrian Army following the adoption of a political settlement.

=== 2020 ===
On 4 April, pro-government NDF forces fired upon an Asayish police vehicle killing one Asayish officer. On 21 April, further clashes broke out between pro-government National Defence Force and Rojava-aligned Asayish paramilitary forces in Al-Qamishli District leading to Russian intervention to stop the hostilities. Communist party of Syria welcomed the agreement

=== 2021 ===
The SDF, which has been subjected to pressures for the transfer of Ayn Isa town in northern Syria to the Syrian government forces, once again besieged the government military area known as "Security Square" in Qamishli city center of Hasakah province on 8 January. The SDF has also applied a blockade for the entry of bread, fuel and wheat into the government controlled regions in Hasakah and Qamishli. The Autonomous Administration of Northeastern Syria accused the Syrian government of coordinating plans with Turkey against the SDF.

Following the blockade, pro-government Syrian people launched large scale protests against the SDF, which led to death of 3 civilians according to the Syrian Government Agency (SANA).

As the tensions increased due the incident, 1 government force element was killed and 4 were injured in Hasekeh, after the clashes that sparked out on 30 January and 1 February between the Pro-Government volunteers and the SDF.

On February 2, both sides decided to end the sieges against each other after a meeting between the Russian authorities and the DAANES.

On April 20, clashes broke out between the SDF and the pro-government NDF forces in the city of Qamishlo, as the NDF arrested an SDF Commander. The SDF reportedly stormed an HQ belonging to the SAA in the city during the clashes so far. Reports say there are dead and wounded among both the SDF and the SAA.

=== 2022 ===
As Erdogan's government in Turkey has decided to follow a different strategy in the Middle East in the beginning of 2022, Turkish President Erdogan stated that it would be possible to meet with Assad, and that there can be no resentment in politics, which caused to allegations in the Turkish media that Turkey and Syrian government could launch a joint operation against the SDF, especially in government-based TV channels.

SDF General Commander Mazloum Abdi stated in a January 2022 interview that, “We do not accept a return to the past. The Autonomous Administration has existed for ten years, and they must accept it constitutionally. Also, with regard to the military file, by which I mean the SDF and Asayish, the regime must recognize both of them. However, the regime is not yet prepared to take that step. Likewise, a solution will not be reached without international parties putting constant pressure on the Assad regime.”

On November 28, the Syrian government stopped the flow of fuel to areas controlled by the SDF in Aleppo.

=== 2023 ===
On 25 February 2023, Syrian Democratic Council Co-President Îlham Ahmed stated, “The ruling regime has not changed its stance, not on the humanitarian or political levels...It has not shown any flexibility towards the Syrians who are at odds with it. It rejected channels of communication to address the aftermath of the earthquake and ensuing humanitarian catastrophe.”

On March 15, 2023, the SDC released a statement commemorating the Syrian Revolution, and referred to the Syrian Government as “the central tyrannical regime.” The council annually holds celebrations of the Revolution against the Government, including in Raqqa, Deir Ezzor, and Manbij.

During the 2023 Deir Ezzor Clashes, the Syrian Government and Iran were alleged by locals, independent researchers, and the SDF to have smuggled military personnel and weapons across the Euphrates to attack SDF soldiers and establish armed cells. According to the local media outlet DeirEzzor24, Mosque preachers in Syrian Government-held areas urged people to attack the SDF and International Coalition during the clashes.

=== 2024 ===
On 3 December 2024, the SDF, supported by the US-led CJTF–OIR coalition, launched an offensive on pro-government forces in the eastern Deir ez-Zor region.

On 6 December, pro-government forces withdrew from Deir ez-Zor. Shortly following their withdrawal, SDF fighters captured Deir ez-Zor and extended their control all the way to Abu Kamal and the Iraqi border.

== Post-Assad Syria ==
=== 2024 ===
On 8 December, the Assad regime fell and the Syrian caretaker government was established.

=== 2025–2026 ===
On 11 March 2025, al-Sharaa signed an agreement with Mazloum Abdi, the commander of the SDF, to incorporate SDF-controlled institutions into the state, establish border crossings, and pledge to fight the remnants of the Assad regime. The deadline for the merger was set for the end of 2025. After SDF stalled with the implementation of the 10 March agreement as the deadline passed, offensives were launched by Syrian forces against SDF positions, at first in Deir Hafer and Maskanah on the morning of 17 January 2026 following an SDF withdrawal, later Tabqa and southern Raqqa later in the day, and eventually crossing the Euphrates the day after. After withdrawing from Deir ez-Zor governorate and a defeat in Raqqa and Shaddadi, the SDF accepted a ceasefire peace proposal, that sees the handover of Raqqa, Deir ez-Zor governorates, all border outposts and gas fields from SDF to Syrian government, full integration of SDF legions into the Syrian army, establishment of a governor of the Hasakah governorate (presumed Mazloum Abdi), an SDF acceptance of recent presidential decrees on Kurds, a safe return of Afrin and Sheikh Maqsoud refugees, and other clauses. On 30 January 2026, the Syrian government and the SDF reached a truce and integration agreement, ending recent clashes in the northeast. Both sides would withdraw fighters from frontlines, with government forces entering the Kurdish strongholds of al-Hasakah and Qamishli. SDF fighters and institutions would be incorporated into state structures, including new military brigades, while the state would assume control of Kurdish civilian institutions. Kurdish civil and educational rights were recognized, and displaced persons were allowed to return.

On 20 August, during the centenary celebrations of the city of Qamishli, SDF Commander-in-Chief Mazloum Abdi declared that the integration of the military, security, and administrative institutions into the Syrian state had been completed and that non-Syrian fighters affiliated with the SDF had withdrawn. However, other media reported that Abdi stopped short of announcing the SDF's dissolution and that issues such as the integration of the Women's Protection Units remained unresolved. On 25 August, Abdi, alongside YPJ commander Newroz Ahmed and co-president of the DAANES Executive Council, Îlham Ehmed, travelled to Damascus for a day of discussions, following which Abdi gave a press conference in which he declared the integration of the SDF into the Syrian state and its formal dissolution.

== See also ==
- Foreign relations of the Democratic Autonomous Administration of North and East Syria
- YPG–FSA relations
- Rojava–Islamist conflict
- Popular Resistance of the Eastern Region
