= Hasakah Central Prison =

Prison in Hasakah, Syria

Coordinates: 36.506359205448796°N 40.741574764251716°E

- Interactive map of Hasakah Central Prison
- Location: Hasakah, Hasakah Governorate, Syria

The Hasakah Central Prison is a prison located in Hasakah, Hasakah Governorate, Syria.

== History ==
In 1993, Kurdish prisoners protested the conditions at the central prison. Syrian security forces stormed the prison on March 23, 1993, which lead to 61 prisoners burning to death, and the subsequent execution of another five.

The Islamic State captured the prison in 2015 from Syrian government forces, releasing all inmates. The prison was then used as base by the Islamic State, before being captured by Syrian Armed Forces during the 2015 battle of Hasakah.

The prison was captured by Asayish forces during the 2016 battle of Hasakah.
