= Battle of Hasakah (2016) =

Component of the Syrian Civil War

Coordinates: 36.4833°N 40.7500°E

- Part of the Syrian Civil War
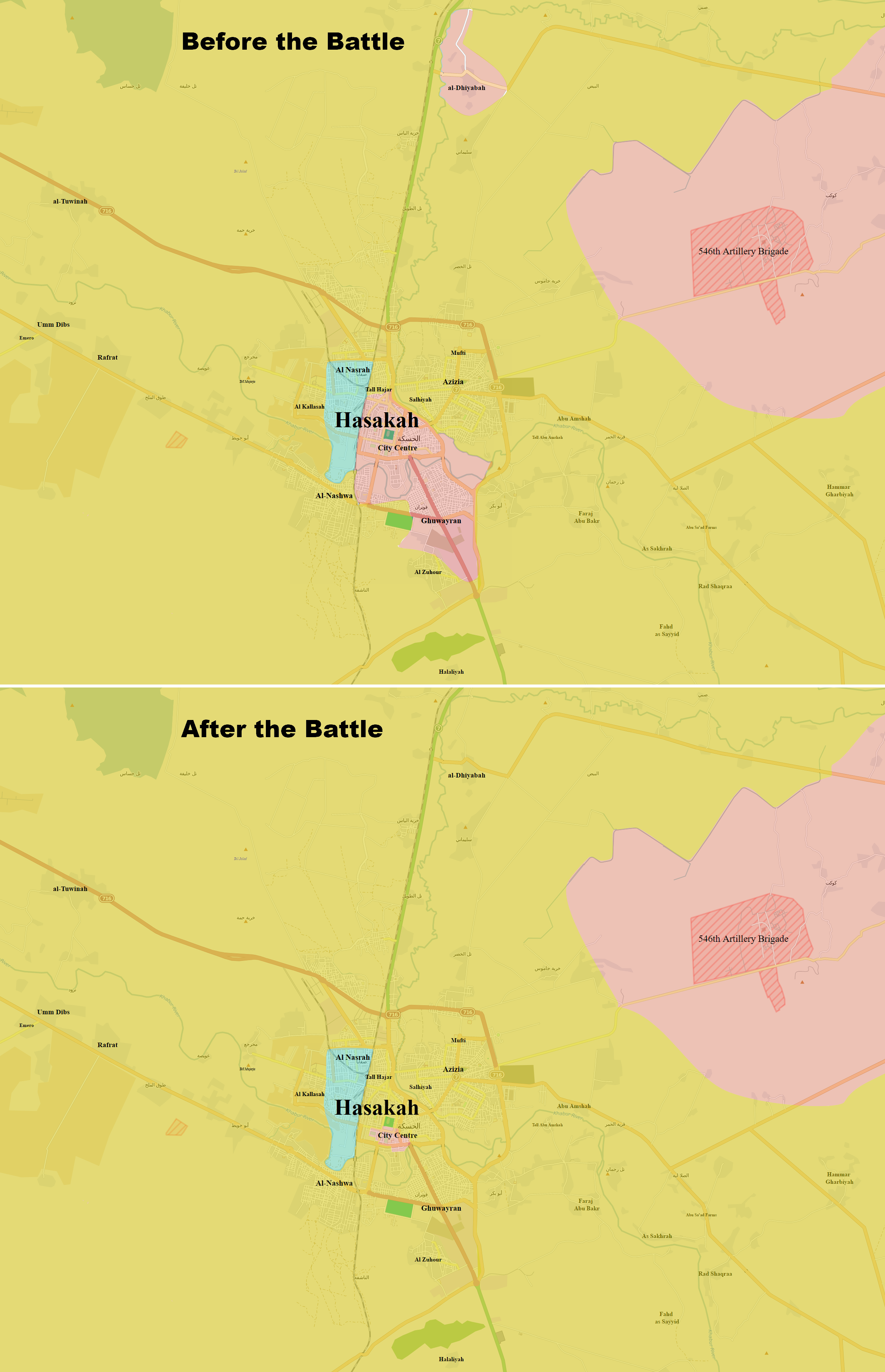
- Military situation in Hasakah City and the surrounding areas before (top) and after (bottom) the battle. Controlled by the Syrian Government Controlled by Rojava Controlled by the Syriac Union Party
Date	16–23 August 2016 (1 week)
Location	Hasakah, Hasakah Governorate, Syria
Result	Ceasefire; strategic Kurdish victory: The NDF leaves the city and is barred from reentering; Creation of the Hasakah Security Box
Territorial changes	Kurdish forces take control of 90% of the city

Belligerents
(Democratic Autonomous Administration of North and East Syria) Democratic Federation of Northern Syria: Asayish police; YPG; YPJ; Civilian Defense Force (HPC); MFS; Supported by: CJTF–OIR: United States	(Syria) Syrian Arab Republic: National Defence Forces; Syrian Army; Syrian Arab Air Force; Supported by: Iran (Kurdish claim); Hezbollah (Kurdish claim)

Commanders and leaders
(Democratic Autonomous Administration of North and East Syria) Lawend † (General commander); Munir Mohamad † (Asayish commander); Haval Rasho (YPG 4th Division commander) Lewend Rojava (YPG commander)	Maj. Gen. Hassan Mohammad (Commander of the eastern region of Syria); Osama Nathim al-Ahmed †{ (123rd Regiment commander); Muhammed Za’al al-Ali (Hasakah governor)

Units involved
YPG; 4th Division of Girê Spî; United States Armed Forces; United States Air Force; United States special operations forces	Syrian Army; 3rd Armoured Division; 123rd Regiment

Casualties and losses
14 Asayish killed (Kurdish and NDF claim)	77 killed, 170 captured (Kurdish claim)
- 27–40+ civilians killed

The 2016 Battle of Hasakah was fought between the paramilitary police of the Asayish and the People's Protection Units (YPG), against the pro-government National Defence Forces and the Syrian Arab Army, backed by the Syrian Arab Air Force, in the city of Hasakah, Syria.

== Background ==
In 2014, a series of powerful offensives by the Islamic State of Iraq and the Levant brought much of Hasakah Governorate under the group's control. Control of Hasakah city itself was split between the Kurdish and Syrian Government forces. On 21 February 2015, the YPG launched a counter-offensive against ISIL, which was followed by a Syrian government offensive on 27 February. The dual offensives saw ISIL pushed back in Hasakah, with the YPG capturing over 100 towns, villages and hamlets and the Syrian Army capturing around 40 villages on Highway 7, which links Hasakah to Qamishli. In May 2015, the YPG captured a further 230 towns, villages, and farms west of Hasakah during the Western Hasakah Offensive. On 30 May ISIL launched an offensive on Hasakah city, but this was repelled. They launched a second offensive on the city on 23 June, initially capturing four districts and areas within three others, as well as multiple villages southwest of Hasakah. However, a YPG counterattack in Hasakah with the support of coalition and later backed by the SAA cleared it of ISIL fighters by 1 August, with the YPG left in control of 75% of the city, while the Syrian Army controlled 25%.

== The battle ==
On 16 August 2016, according to pro-government Al-Masdar News, clashes broke out in Hasakah city between Asayish and NDF forces, after a small skirmish, with both sides claiming to be advancing.

On 19 August, Al-Masdar claimed that NDF fighters had advanced in the city center, capturing the New Hospital and parts of the Marsho area. Al-Masdar said that the Syrian Arab Air Force launched 10 airstrikes on the Asayish headquarters. According to Kurdish sourcses, it was the first time during the Syrian civil war when the Syrian Arab Air Force launched airstrikes against the Kurdish forces. US special forces withdrew around Hasakah the same day, though the CJTF–OIR increased their air patrols in the area to prevent the Syrian Air Force from bombing U.S. special forces as well as their Kurdish allies and monitor the situation. Nevertheless, U.S. officials said that they were not trying to establish a no-fly zone. Meanwhile, heavy clashes took place in the Ghwyran area northeast of Hasakah and in the al-Nashweh area in the eastern city, where Kurdish forces made major progress according to the Hawar News Agency.

Early on 20 August, fighting calmed down, as another attempt to mediate a ceasefire was made. The governor of Hasakah, Muhammed Za’al al-Ali, urged the YPG to stop fighting against the Syrian government, as they had fought together against ISIL and had a supportive relationship before the clashes. The PYD accused local NDF troops of spreading anti-Kurdish propaganda and demanded that all NDF units had to leave the city for a new peace agreement, which the Syrian government refused. As result, these talks failed, so heavy clashes once again broke out in the city at noon, when the Syrian Air Force started airstrikes with the artillery support for the Syrian Arab Army. After fierce fighting near the Guweiran District to the southwest and in the Nashwa neighborhoods at the city center throughout the night, the violence again abated in course of the following day. Later on 21 August, the newly arrived YPG and MFS forces launched a massive offensive in the city, storming the Red Villas, the Guweiran District, the Al-Askari District, and the eastern Nashwa neighborhoods, resulting in fierce fighting there as Syrian government fighters launched counterattacks to regain these positions. Despite several attempts, Syrian government forces failed to regain lost positions. In southern Hasakah city, the Asayish captured the Faculty of Economics, but reportedly retreated after being shelled by the Syrian Army from the Kawkab Mountains. According to Al-Masdar, to support the pro-government fighters the Syrian Air Force launched over 30 airstrikes on the Kurdish forces in the city. Despite heavy airstrikes and artillery, Kurdish forces captured much of the eastern Guweiran district and were still advancing by the evening. In course of the next night, fighting again stopped. US jets began preventing the Syrian Air Force from striking the Kurds in the city, thus enabling the latter to better advance against government forces.

By dawn on 22 August, however, the Syrian Air Force started its airstrikes again against Asayish checkpoints, which led the Asayish to storm the northeastern Guweiran District, while NDF units reportedly managed to advance in the Tal Hajjar District in northern and the Al-Zuhour District in southern Hasakah. Fighting was also reported at the al-Basil turning. On the same day, al-Masdar reported that the Kurdish forces were "on the verge of seizing the entire provincial capital", Hasakah, after they captured the eastern neighborhoods of the Al-Nashwa District and positions in the Sports City, which served as a major NDF stronghold. Later that day, Kurdish forces captured the central prison and all NDF positions around the Sports City collapsed. At that point, Kurdish forces were in control of about 90% of Hasakah.

On 23 August 2016, a ceasefire agreement was signed after Russian mediation, which left Hasakah city almost completely under the control of the Kurdish forces, with all Syrian Armed Forces personnel forced to leave and indefinitely banned from the city. Only the security square which contained the government departments of the city remained under the protection of Syrian government police units, while control over all seized areas were given to the Asayish.

== See also ==
- Battle of Qamishli (2016)
- Siege of Qamishli and Hasakah
- Qamishli clashes (2021)
- Rojava–Syria relations
