= Constitution of the Democratic Autonomous Administration of North and East Syria =

Provisional constitution

The Constitution of the Democratic Autonomous Administration of North and East Syria, officially titled the Charter of the Social Contract, was the provisional constitution of the self-proclaimed autonomous region known as the Democratic Autonomous Administration of North and East Syria from 2012 until its integration into the Syrian state in 2026.

The initial version was adopted on 29 January 2014, when the Democratic Union Party (PYD), the political wing of the People's Protection Units (YPG) and the largest party in the autonomous region, declared the three regions it controlled autonomous from the Syrian government. Revisions were made in December 2016 and December 2023. Article 12 of the 2014 version states that the autonomous region remains an "integral part of Syria", anticipating a future federalization of Syria; the preamble of the 2016 version states that the region "is part of the united Syrian democratic federalism"; and Article 5 of the 2023 version states that the region is "part of the Syrian Democratic Republic".

The constitution gained international attention for its explicit affirmation of minority rights, gender equality, and a form of direct democracy known as democratic confederalism.

== Background ==
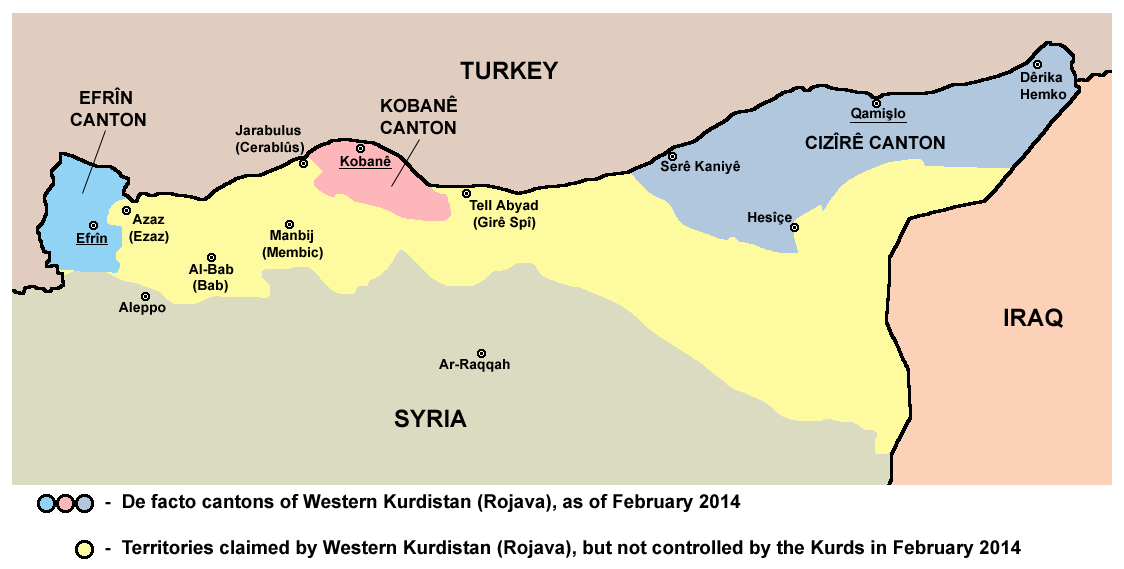
Areas controlled and claimed by Syrian Kurds and allies (Feb. 2014).

When the Syrian Civil War broke out in 2011, the Syrian Kurdish parties avoided taking sides. When Syrian government forces retreated in mid-2012 to fight the mostly Arab rebels elsewhere, Kurdish groups gradually took control. On 12 July 2012, the two main political alliances in the autonomous region, the Movement for a Democratic Society (including Democratic Union Party (PYD)) and the Kurdish National Council (KNC) formed Kurdish Supreme Committee (KSC) as the overarching governing body of all three self-proclaimed cantons of Afrin, Kobane and Jazira. The PYD and its armed wing People's Protection Units (YPG) soon became the dominant force. Soon PYD and other allied parties in Movement for a Democratic Society declared a unilateral interim government in November 2013 and also a committee was appointed to write a transitional constitution. Nevertheless, in January 2014 it agreed to form a coalition government with the KNC, but this agreement didn't last long.

== Versions ==
=== 2014 ===
The January 2014 version was called The Social Contract of the Autonomous Regions of Afrin, Jazira, and Kobane.

=== 2016 ===
On 27–28 June 2016, the executive committee to organize a constitution for Rojava presented a draft to replace the 2014 version. The new version was published on 29 December 2016 as the Social Contract of the Democratic Federation of Northern Syria. The number of articles was reduced from 96 to 83.

=== 2018 ===
A new constitution was created in 2018 as the autonomous administration renamed itself the Autonomous Administration of North and East Syria. However, this document is not publicly available as of 2019.

=== 2023 ===
The constitution was revised in 2023 and named the Social Contract of the Democratic Autonomous Administration of the North and East Syria Region. The length increased to 134 articles.

== Contents ==
=== January 2014 version ===
The January 2014 version contains 96 articles.

==== Preamble ====
Text of the preamble:

We, the people of the Democratic Autonomous Regions of Afrin, Jazira and Kobani, a confederation of Kurds, Arabs, Syriacs, Arameans, Turkmen, Armenians and Chechens, freely and solemnly declare and establish this Charter.

In pursuit of freedom, justice, dignity and democracy and led by principles of equality and environmental sustainability, the Charter proclaims a new social contract, based upon mutual and peaceful coexistence and understanding between all strands of society. It protects fundamental human rights and liberties and reaffirms the peoples' right to self-determination.

Under the Charter, we, the people of the Autonomous Regions, unite in the spirit of reconciliation, pluralism and democratic participation so that all may express themselves freely in public life. In building a society free from authoritarianism, militarism, centralism and the intervention of religious authority in public affairs, the Charter recognizes Syria's territorial integrity and aspires to maintain domestic and international peace.

In establishing this Charter, we declare a political system and civil administration founded upon a social contract that reconciles the rich mosaic of Syria through a transitional phase from dictatorship, civil war and destruction, to a new democratic society where civic life and social justice are preserved.

Section	Articles	Contents
General Principles	1–12	Article 4 lists the structure of the government. Article 3 and 5 lists the administrative centers of each canton. Article 12 confirms Rojava as an integral part of Syria.
Basic Principles	13–20	Article 15 declares the People's Protection Units (YPG) as the sole military force of Rojava.
Rights and Liberties	21–44	Article 21 refers to the Universal Declaration of Human Rights, the International Covenant on Civil and Political Rights, the International Covenant on Economic, Social and Cultural Rights.
Legislative Assembly	45–53	Responsibilities of the Legislative Assembly.
Executive Council	54–62	Responsibilities of the Executive Council.
Judicial Council	63–75	Responsibilities of the Judicial Council.
Higher Commission of Elections	76	Responsibilities of the Higher Commission of Elections.
Supreme Constitutional Court	77–80	Responsibilities of the Supreme Constitutional Court.
General Rules	81–96	

==== General Rules ====
- (Articles 81–96)
- The section "IX General Rules" lists general rules including criteria for constitutional amendment and martial law.
- Article 95 lists the bodies of the executive council:
1. Body of Foreign Relations
2. Body of Defense
3. Body of Internal Affairs
4. Body of Justice
5. Body of Cantonal and Municipal Councils and affiliated to it Committee of Planning and Census
6. Body of Finance, and affiliated to it a)-Committee on Banking Regulations. b)- Committee of Customs and Excise
7. Body of Social Affairs
8. Body of Education
9. Body of Agriculture
10. Body of Energy
11. Body of Health
12. Body of Trade and Economic Cooperation
13. Body of Martyrs and Veterans Affairs
14. Body of Culture
15. Body of Transport
16. Body of Youth and Sports
17. Body of Environment, Tourism and Historical Objects
18. Body of Religious Affairs
19. Body of Family and Gender Equality
20. Body of Human Rights
21. Body of Communications
22. Body of Food Security

== See also ==
- Constitution of Syria
