= Al-Muabbada =

Town in Al-Hasakah Governorate, Syria

Al-Muabbada المعبدة Girkê Legê
- Town
- Location in Syria
- Coordinates: 37°0′59″N 41°57′16″E
- Country: Syria
- Governorate: al-Hasakah
- District: al-Malikiyah
- Subdistrict: al-Muabbada
- Control: (Democratic Autonomous Administration of North and East Syria) Autonomous Administration of North and East Syria
- Elevation: 470 m (1,540 ft)

Population (2004 census)
  - Total: 15,759
- Time zone: UTC+3 (AST)

Al-Muabbada (Arabic: المعبدة; Kurdish: Girkê Legê) is a town in al-Hasakah Governorate, Syria. According to the Syria Central Bureau of Statistics (CBS), Al-Muabbada had a population of 15,759 in the 2004 census. According to the Kurdish news agency "Rudaw", the Ba'athist Party under President Hafez al-Assad changed the name of the town to Al-Muabbada. The town is 35 kilometres from the Iraqi border and 15 kilometres from the Turkish border. As of 2004, Al-Muabbada is the eighth largest town in Al-Hasakah governorate. The majority of the inhabitants of the town are Kurds with a large Shammar Arab minority.

== Syrian Civil War ==
On 24 July 2012, the PYD announced that Syrian security forces withdrew from Al-Muabbada. The YPG forces afterwards took control of all government institutions and the town came fully under the PYD's control.

On 27 September 2022, 2 SDF fighters were killed in a Turkish drone strike on their car in the town.
