= Asayish (Democratic Autonomous Administration of North and East Syria) =

Police force in North-East Syria

Internal Security Forces Asayish (Asayîş)
- Flag used in the Jazira, Euphrates, and Afrin Regions
- Active: 2012–present
- Country: Syria
- Allegiance: Democratic Autonomous Administration of North and East Syria (until 2026); Syrian Ministry of Interior (from 2026)
- Type: Police
- Role: Security and policing
- Size: c. 15,000 (2016): Jazira Asayish: 10,000; Euphrates Asayish: 2,000; Afrin Asayish: 3,000 (until 2018); Raqqa ISF: 1,200
- Engagements: Syrian Civil War; Rojava conflict; Rojava–Islamist conflict; Eastern Syria insurgency; Deir ez-Zor clashes (2023); Deir ez-Zor offensive (2024); Turkish offensive into north-eastern Syria (2024–2025); Operation Dawn of Freedom; 2024 Manbij offensive; SDF–Syrian transitional government clashes (2025–2026)
- Website: http://www.asayish.com/

Commanders
- Chief of Asayish forces: Ciwan Ibrahim
- Spokesman: Brig. Gen. Aba Ali Hassan
- Leader in Sheikh Maqsoud: Alif Muhammad

The Internal Security Forces, (Note: Kurdish: Hêza Ewlekariya Hindîrin; Arabic: قوى الامن الداخلي, romanized: Quwā al-ʾAmn ad-Dāḵilī.) also known as the Asayish, (Note: Kurdish: Asayîş; Arabic: الْأَسَايِش, romanized: al-ʾAsāyiš; Syriac: ܐܣܐܝܝܫ, Kurdish for "Security".) is an internal security and police force which previously served the Democratic Autonomous Administration of North and East Syria, including Jazira, Euphrates, Raqqa, and previously Afrin Region. Formed in the early stages of the Syrian Civil War, it had initially been established to police areas controlled by the Kurdish Supreme Committee. In October 2013, the Asayish claimed to have 4,000 members; by 2017, the number had reportedly risen to over 15,000. By August 2026, the integration of the Asayish into the security forces of the Syrian Ministry of Interior is underway.

== Structure ==
=== Organization ===
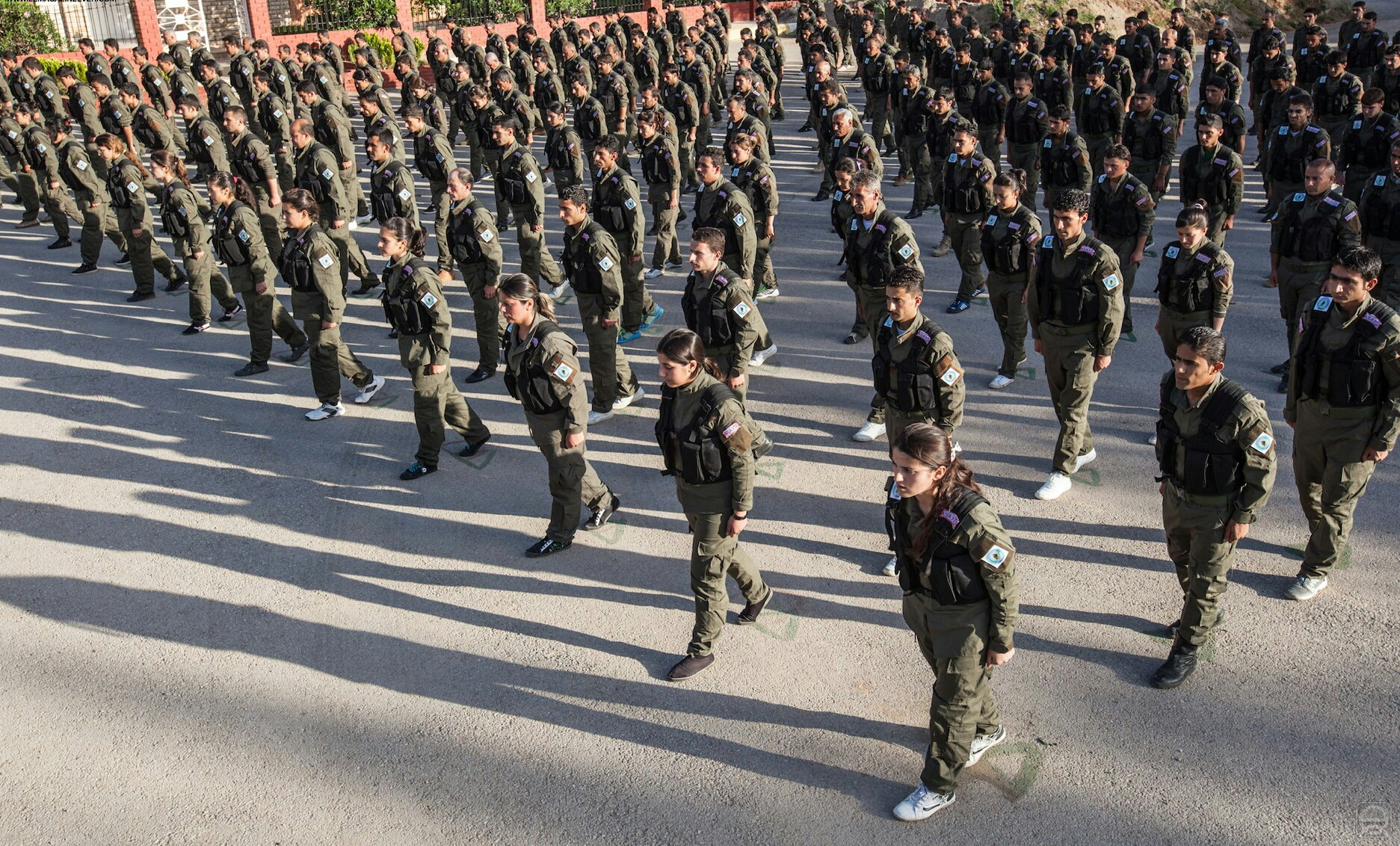
Members of the Asayish

According to the Constitution of the Democratic Autonomous Administration of North and East Syria, policing is the responsibility of the autonomous sub-regions. Administratively and organizationally they are affiliated with the Interior Commission. The People’s councils of West Kurdistan approve Asayish leaders who are proposed by internal security institutions, and supervise them. Further the Asayish submits periodic reports to the people’s councils.

Overall, the local Asayish forces are composed of 26 official bureaus that aim to provide security and solutions to social problems. The six main units of the Asayish are Checkpoints Administration, Anti-Terror Forces Command (Kurdish: Hêzên Antî Teror, HAT), Intelligence Directorate, Organized Crime Directorate, Traffic Directorate and Treasury Directorate. By 2016, 218 Asayish centers were established and 385 checkpoints with 10 Asayish members in each checkpoint were set up. 105 Asayish offices provide security against ISIL on the frontlines across the region. Larger cities have general directorates that are responsible for all aspects of security including road controls. Each sub-region has a HAT command and each Asayish center organizes itself autonomously. Overall chief of the police is the former journalist Ciwan Ibrahim.

In addition to its security units, the Asayish operates a specialized demining branch known as the Asayish Demining Specialists, tasked with clearing mines and unexploded ordnance from former battlefronts and areas once held by hostile forces like ISIS. They work in coordination with the Roj Mine Control Organization (RMCO), and together they have cleared approximately 51 square kilometers of land and removed 8,740 mines and explosive devices across Syria, as of 2018.

In the Jazira Region, the Asayish are further complemented by the Assyrian Sutoro police force, which is organized in every area with Christian population, and provides security and solutions to social problems in collaboration with other Asayish units. Though the Sutoro is officially subordinate to the Asayish, and represented on the Asayish executive board, it operates largely autonomously in regard to its internal affairs. Thus, it patrols the Christian neighborhoods of Qamishli without interference by the Asayish, and when the Sutoro members want to appoint someone, they don't need the approval of the Asayish. The Assyrian Khabour Guards and Nattoreh also provide security in towns along the Khabur River.

On 17 May 2017, the Raqqa Internal Security Forces were established for policing in Raqqa.

On 25 May 2017, a female branch of the Asayish was established in Al-Shaddadah.

On 4 July 2018, a conference of the Internal Security Forces took place in Raqqa. At the conference, two flags were adopted for the ISF; one saying only Internal Security Forces in Arabic, used in the Raqqa, Tabqa, Deir Ezzor, and Manbij regions, and one saying Asayish as well, used in the Jazira, Afrin, and Euphrates regions.

After an agreement between the DANEES and the Syrian transitional government, Asayish are being integrated into the security forces of the Syrian Ministry of Interior, a process which was ongoing as of late August 2026.

=== Strength, composition and budget ===
The Asayish police has around 15,000 personnel: 10,000 in the Jazira Region, 3,000 in the Afrin Region, and 2,000 in the Euphrates Region. Ethnically, Kurds dominate the Asayish, though half of the active personnel in Jazira Region are Arabs, while around 300 Turkmens have also enlisted, mostly in Tell Abyad. About 30% of the Asayish personnel are women. Members of the force are paid $120 monthly salaries, which is above the average monthly salaries of Syrian civil servants, making Asayish employment rather attractive.

=== Involvement in military operations ===
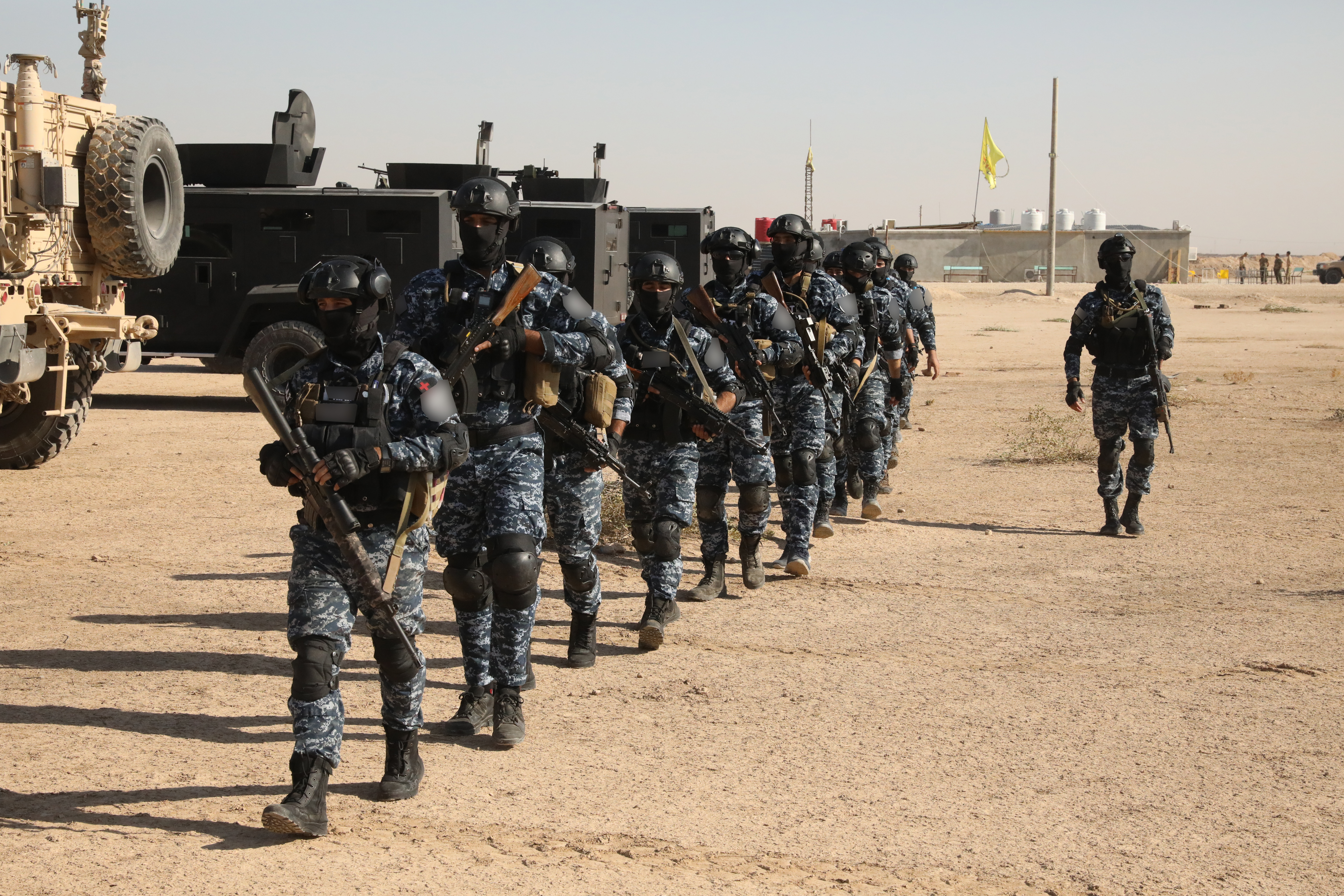
Asayish Anti-Terror Forces (HAT) in Al-Hasakah Governorate in September 2021

While Asayish is primarily a police, the forces of Asayish were involved in tensions against the National Defense Forces, a pro-government militia. The tensions led to the Battle of Hasakah, in August 2016. Ultimately, the Syrian Arab Army was forced to give up neighborhoods in the city. Following rising tensions in the city of Qamishli the Asayish and contingents of its HAT units were embroiled in further conflict with the National Defense Forces leading to the Battle of Qamishli, in April 2021.

In the course of the Raqqa campaign, the Asayish established the Raqqa Internal Security Forces.

== Gender equality ==
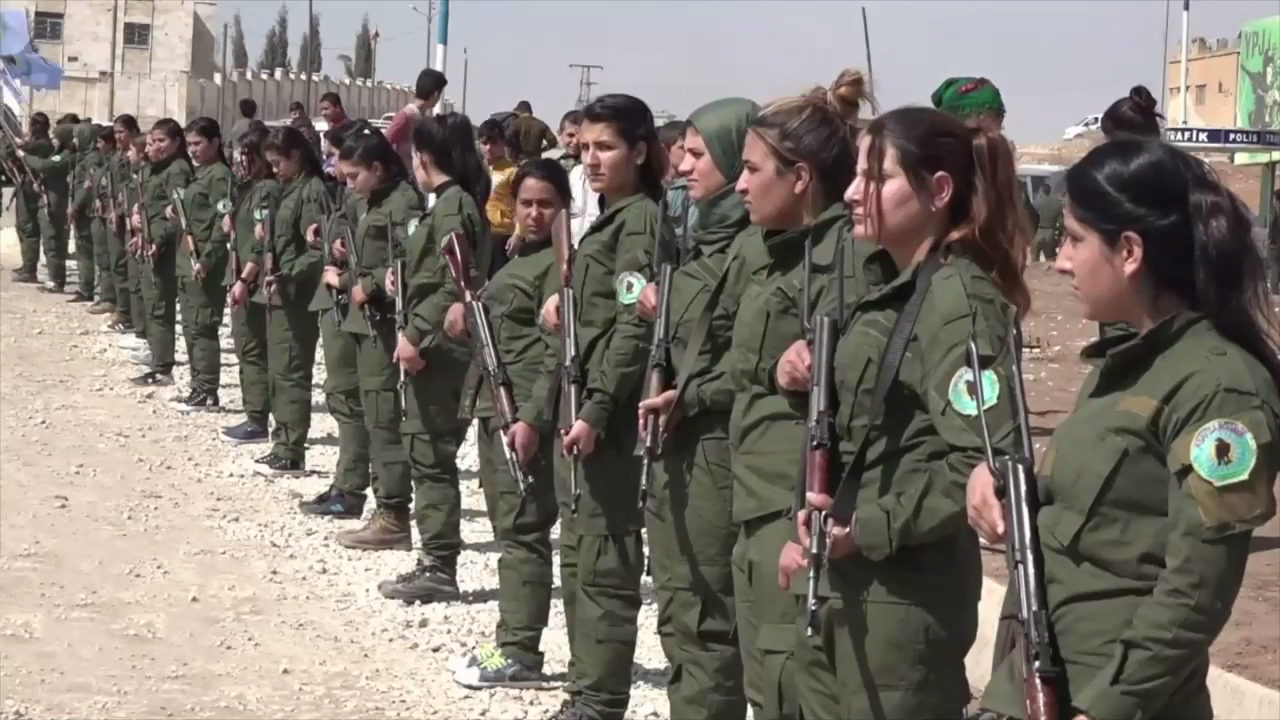
Female members of the Asayish in Kobanî

As with other institutions in the autonomous region, the Asayish are striving for a force based on gender equality. An estimated 25% of Asayish members are women, and the local Asayish forces are co-led by a man and woman. In addition to protecting civilians from armed attacks, the Asayish has created a special branch composed solely of women which is dedicated to gender-based violence, family disputes between women and protection of women during protests, and public celebrations. Their objective is to take care of every case in which a woman gets involved, from gender-based violence to a bank robbery.

Female members of the force face additional risk from attacks by radical Islamists. Some women regard joining the Asayish as an act of personal and societal liberation.

== Citizen-led policing ==
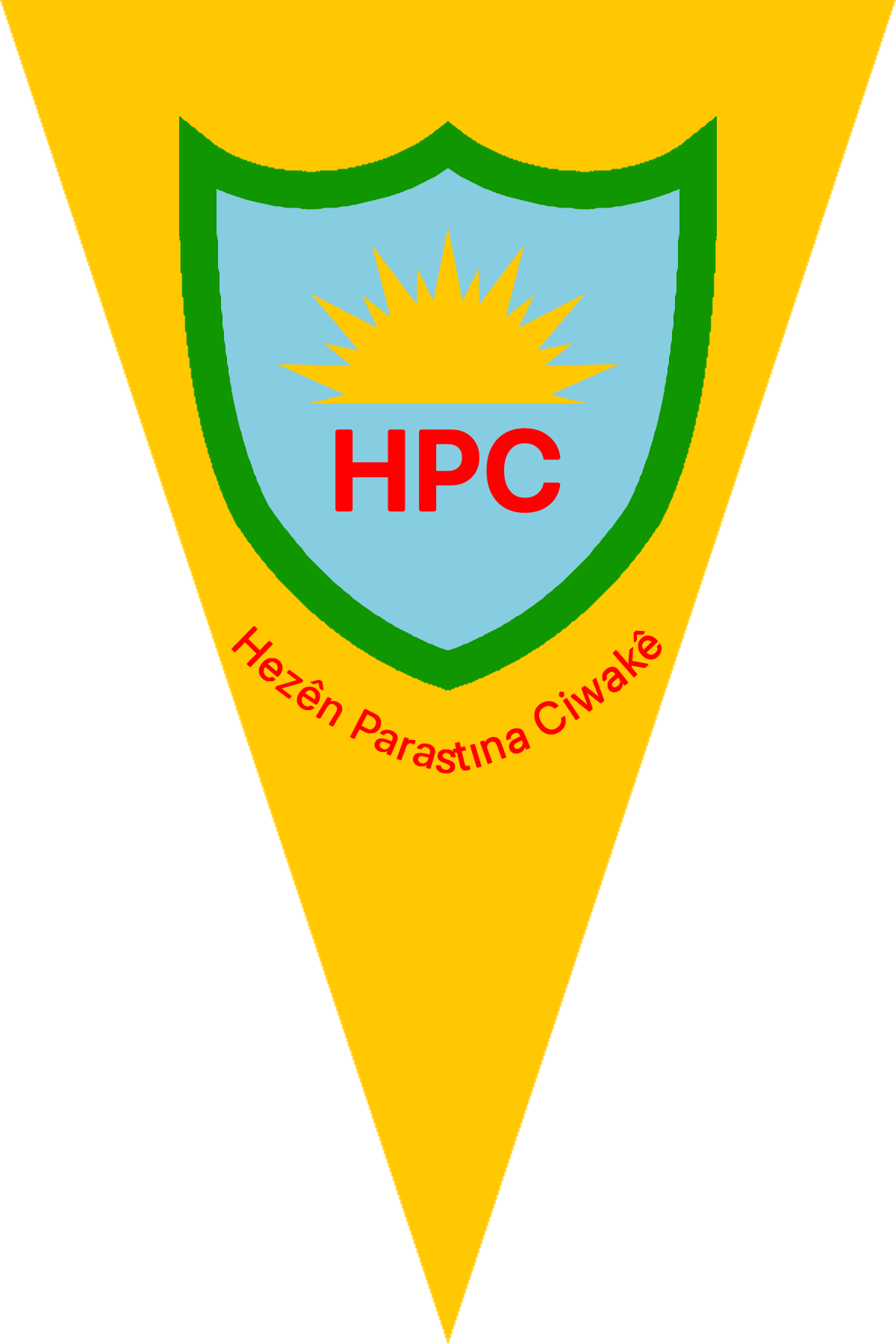
Flag of Civilian Defence Forces (Hêzên Parastina Civakî, HPC).

Throughout the region, the municipal Civilian Defense Forces (HPC) and the regional Self-Defense Forces (HXP) also serve local-level security.

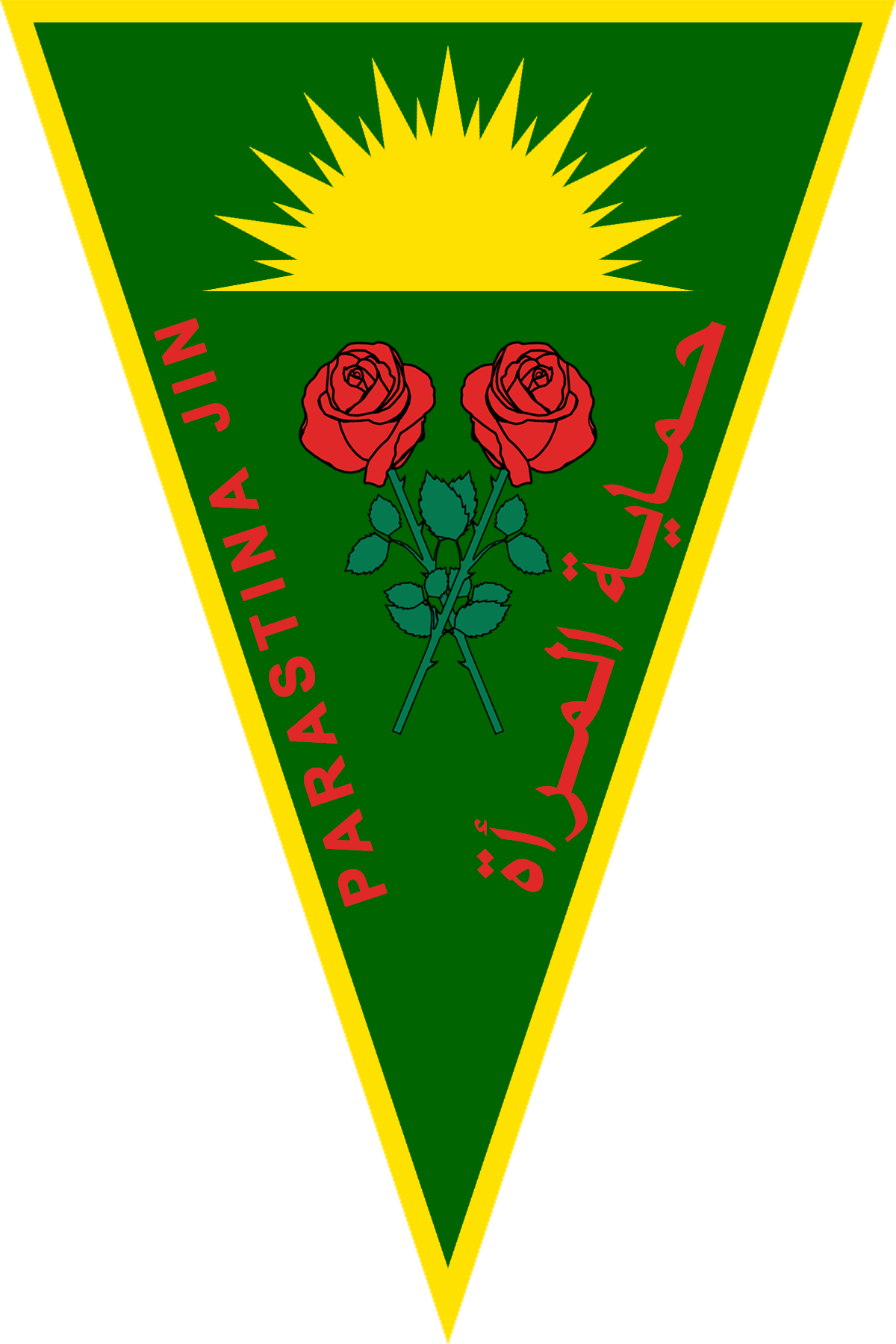
Flag of Women's Civil Defence Forces (Hêzên Parastina Civakî Jin, HPC-Jin). Women's branch of Civilian Defence Forces.

According to the pro-PYD Peace in Kurdistan Campaign, the region's government is working towards providing all citizens with Asayish training. The ultimate hope is that once the vast majority of citizens have been trained, security can be maintained amongst the citizens and the Asayish itself can be dissolved.

== Training ==
In addition to the use of weapons, Asayish members are also trained in "mediation, ethics, the history of Kurdistan, imperialism, the psychological war waged by popular culture and the importance of education and self-critique." The Internal Security Forces receive training and equipment from the US Department of Defense, including Hêzên Anti-Terror (HAT) who act as the Internal Security Forces’ special forces, carrying out counterinsurgency operations such as High Value Target (HVT) raids

== Controversies ==
In 2014, Human Rights Watch documented reports of beatings of detainees in Asayish custody, as well as use of children for military purposes. A 2024 report by Amnesty International presented similar claims, including the use of torture in ISF facilities and lack of accountability for misconduct.

=== Siege of Sheikh Maqsoud ===
During the siege of Sheikh Maqsoud Asayish fighters were reportedly subject to war-crimes committed by fighters of the Syrian Army. A self-filmed video was shared widely online, showing soldiers throwing the body of Asayish member Deniz Çiya from a rooftop, to cries of “Allahu Akbar!” and “It’s a pig, may the curse be on her honor,” with 'pig' being a common slur used towards Kurdish fighters. Another video showed two soldiers dragging a bound, dead Kurdish fighter down a staircase, stating that, “These are the lions of 60th Division,”, referring to the dead fighter again as a "pig".

== See also ==
- Raqqa Internal Security Forces - the security force in Raqqa
- Sutoro – complementary Assyrian police force in the Jazira Region
- Anti-Terror Units
- Law enforcement in Syria
- Hêzên Komandos - SDF Commando units
